= Sports in Los Angeles =

Competitive physical activities in the Greater Los Angeles metropolitan area

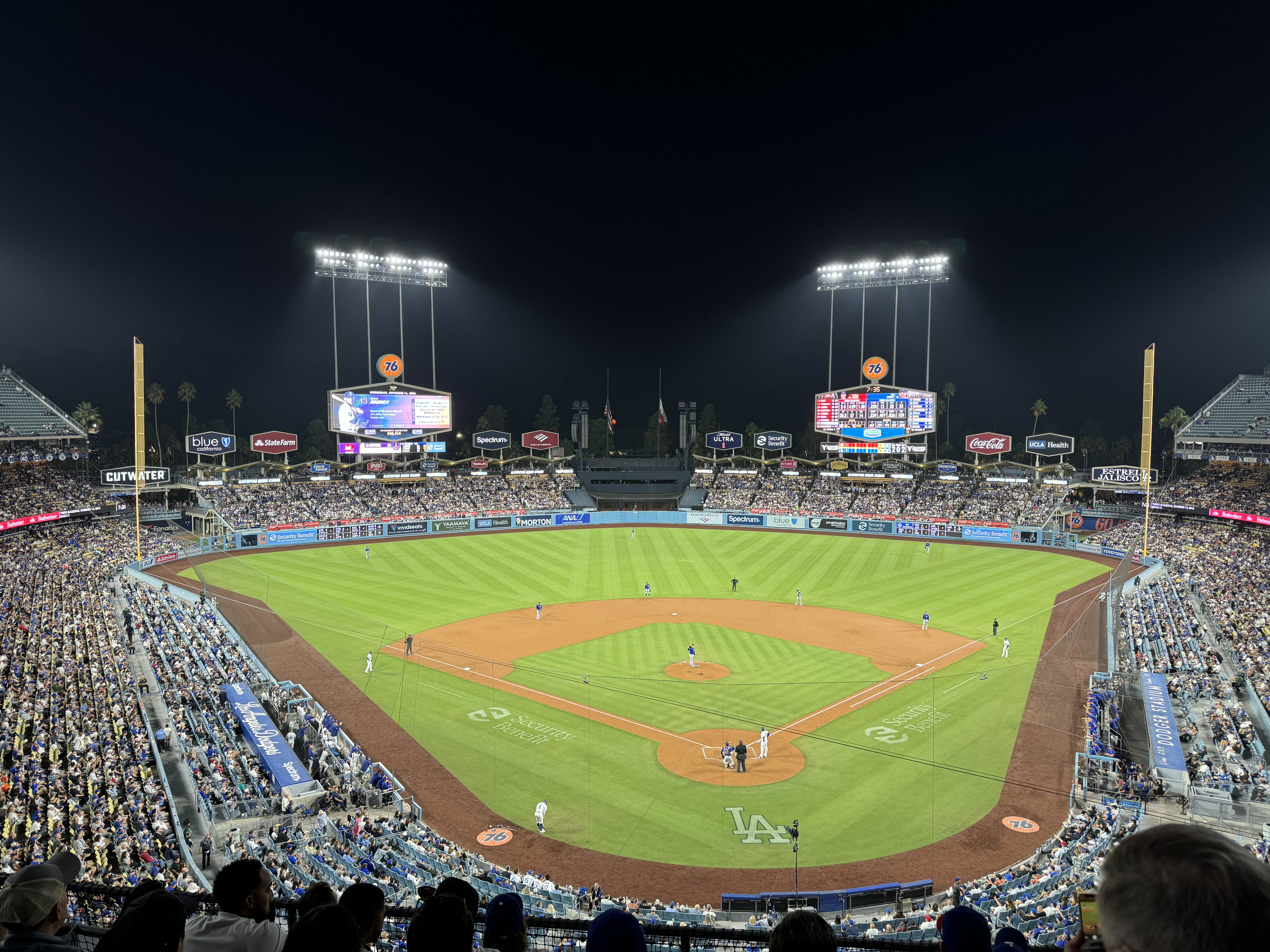
Dodger Stadium, home of the Los Angeles Dodgers (MLB)

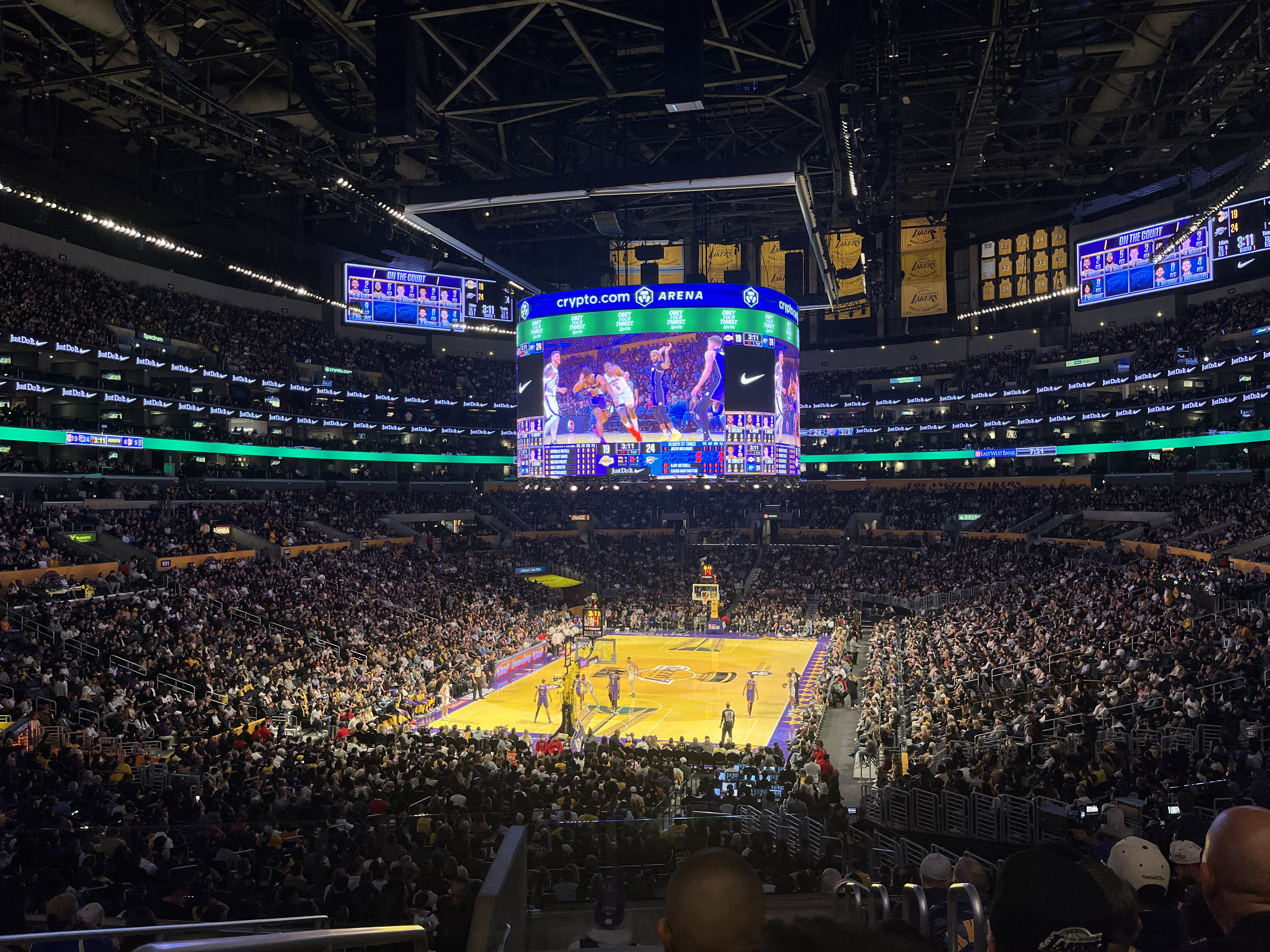
Crypto.com Arena, home of the Los Angeles Lakers (NBA), Los Angeles Kings (NHL), and Los Angeles Sparks (WNBA)

SoFi Stadium, home of the Los Angeles Rams (NFL) and Los Angeles Chargers (NFL)

The Los Angeles metropolitan area in the Southern California region of the United States is home to several professional and amateur sports teams. The Greater Los Angeles area is one of two in the US to host two teams from all five major professional sports leagues in the United States and Canada (the other being the New York metropolitan area).

The area is home to the Los Angeles Dodgers and Los Angeles Angels of Major League Baseball (MLB), the Los Angeles Lakers and Los Angeles Clippers of the National Basketball Association (NBA), the Los Angeles Rams and Los Angeles Chargers of the National Football League (NFL), the Los Angeles Kings and Anaheim Ducks of the National Hockey League (NHL), and Los Angeles FC and the LA Galaxy of Major League Soccer (MLS). In women's major sports leagues, the area hosts the Los Angeles Sparks of the Women's National Basketball Association (WNBA) and Angel City FC of the National Women's Soccer League (NWSL).

The Los Angeles metropolitan area is home to nine universities whose teams compete in various NCAA Division I level sports, most notably the UCLA Bruins and USC Trojans. Between them, these Los Angeles area sports teams have won a combined 105 championship titles. Los Angeles area universities have produced upwards of 200 national championship teams.

The Los Angeles area is home to a variety of sporting venues including the two National Historic Landmarks, the Los Angeles Memorial Coliseum and the Rose Bowl, the multi-purpose arenas, Crypto.com Arena and Intuit Dome, and the roof-covered SoFi Stadium. Los Angeles hosted the 1932 and 1984 Summer Olympics. In 2028, the city will host the Olympic Games for a third time. The area also hosted matches during the 1994 FIFA World Cup, 1999 FIFA Women's World Cup, 2003 FIFA Women's World Cup, 2024 Copa America, and 2026 FIFA World Cup, including the 1994, 1999, and 2003 finals. Los Angeles hosted both the MLB All-Star Game and the MLS All-Star Game in 2021 and 2022 respectively. The area also hosted the College Football Playoff National Championship in 2023 and Super Bowl LVI in 2022, the eighth such event in Los Angeles. The United States Golf Association brought the U.S. Open back to Los Angeles in 2023, with the Los Angeles Country Club as host. The geography and weather of the Los Angeles area makes the region a hub for surfing and beach volleyball.

When the Rams won Super Bowl LVI, the city of Los Angeles became the second city in the 21st century (the first was Boston) to have at least one championship in the "Big Four" sports leagues and the second to ever have championships in four major professional leagues within a ten-year span, accomplishing this feat in a span of seven years, and eight months (from the Kings' championship win on June 13, 2014, to the Rams' championship win on February 13, 2022).

== Major professional league teams ==
The following teams compete in a major professional league.

Club	League	Venue	Attendance	Founded	Established in Los Angeles	Titles in Los Angeles
Los Angeles Angels	Major League Baseball	Angel Stadium	45,050	1961	1961	1
Los Angeles Dodgers	Major League Baseball	Dodger Stadium	56,000	1883	1958	8 (Note: Does not include 1955 World Series won in Brooklyn.)
Anaheim Ducks	National Hockey League	Honda Center	17,174	1993	1993	1
Los Angeles Kings	National Hockey League	Crypto.com Arena	18,340	1967	1967	2
Los Angeles Sparks	Women's National Basketball Association	Crypto.com Arena	10,998	1997	1997	3
Los Angeles Lakers	National Basketball Association	Crypto.com Arena	18,997	1947	1960	12 (Note: Does not include five championships won in Minneapolis.)
Los Angeles Clippers	National Basketball Association	Intuit Dome	18,000	1970	1984	0
Angel City FC	National Women's Soccer League	BMO Stadium	22,000	2020	2022	0
Los Angeles FC	Major League Soccer	BMO Stadium	22,000	2018	2018	1
LA Galaxy	Major League Soccer	Dignity Health Sports Park	27,000	1996	1996	6
Los Angeles Chargers	National Football League	SoFi Stadium	70,240	1960	1960, 2017	0 (Note: Does not include 1963 AFL Championship Game won in San Diego.)
Los Angeles Rams	National Football League	SoFi Stadium	70,240	1936	1946, 2016	2 (Note: Does not include 1945 NFL Championship Game won in Cleveland or Super Bowl XXXIV won in St. Louis.)

== Other highest-level professional league teams ==
The following teams compete in a highest-level professional league.

Club	League	Venue	Founded	Established in Los Angeles	Titles in Los Angeles
Los Angeles Knight Riders	Major League Cricket (MLC)	Knight Riders Cricket Ground	2020	2020	1
LA Riot	BIG3	Intuit Dome	2024	2024	0
Los Angeles Queens	Women's Professional Baseball League (WPBL)	–	2025	2025	1
Los Angeles Orbit	LOVB Pro	–	2025	2025	0
Los Angeles Thunder	Major League Volleyball (2026) (MLV)	–	2026	2026	0

Location of major league teams in Greater Los Angeles area

== Former teams ==
Club	League	Last Venue	Years in L.A.	Titles in L.A.
Los Angeles Dons	All-America Football Conference	Los Angeles Memorial Coliseum	1946–1949	0
Los Angeles Raiders	National Football League	Los Angeles Memorial Coliseum	1982–1994	1
Anaheim Amigos/Los Angeles Stars	American Basketball Association	Los Angeles Memorial Sports Arena	1967–1970	0
Los Angeles Sharks	World Hockey Association	Los Angeles Memorial Sports Arena	1972–1974	0
Los Angeles Wolves	United Soccer Association& North American Soccer League	Los Angeles Memorial Coliseum	1967–1968	1
Los Angeles Toros	National Professional Soccer League & North American Soccer League	Los Angeles Memorial Coliseum	1967	0
Los Angeles Aztecs	North American Soccer League	Rose Bowl & Los Angeles Memorial Coliseum	1974–1981	1
California Surf	North American Soccer League	Anaheim Stadium	1978–1981	0
Los Angeles Lazers	Major Indoor Soccer League	The Forum	1982–1989	0
L.A. United/Anaheim Splash	Continental Indoor Soccer League	The Great Western Forum & Honda Center	1993–1997	0
Chivas USA	Major League Soccer	StubHub Center	2005–2014	0
Los Angeles Sol	Women's Professional Soccer	Home Depot Center	2009–2010	0

=== Baseball ===
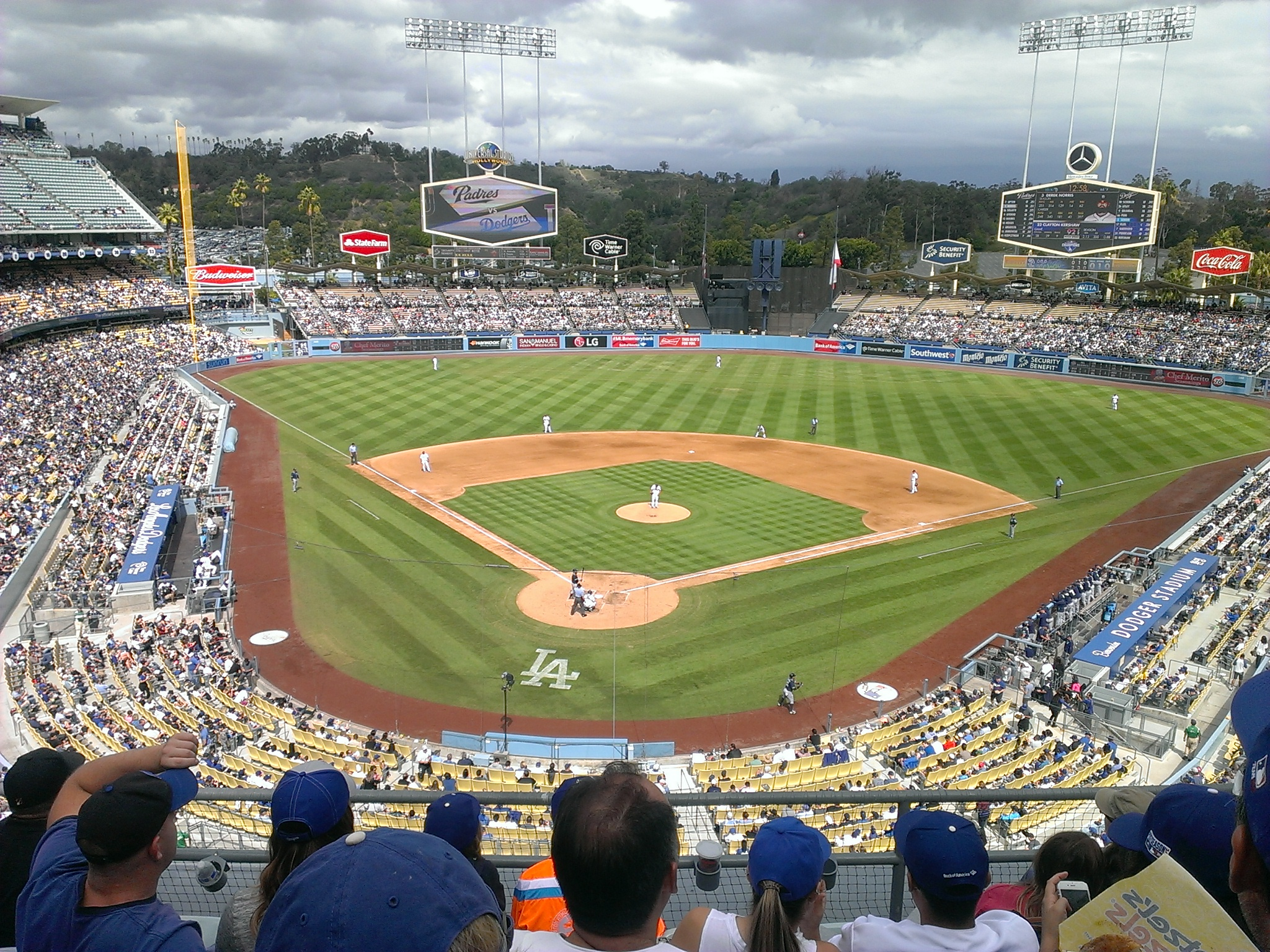
Dodger Stadium

The Los Angeles area is one of four metropolitan areas to host two Major League Baseball teams—the Los Angeles Dodgers in the National League and the Los Angeles Angels in the American League.

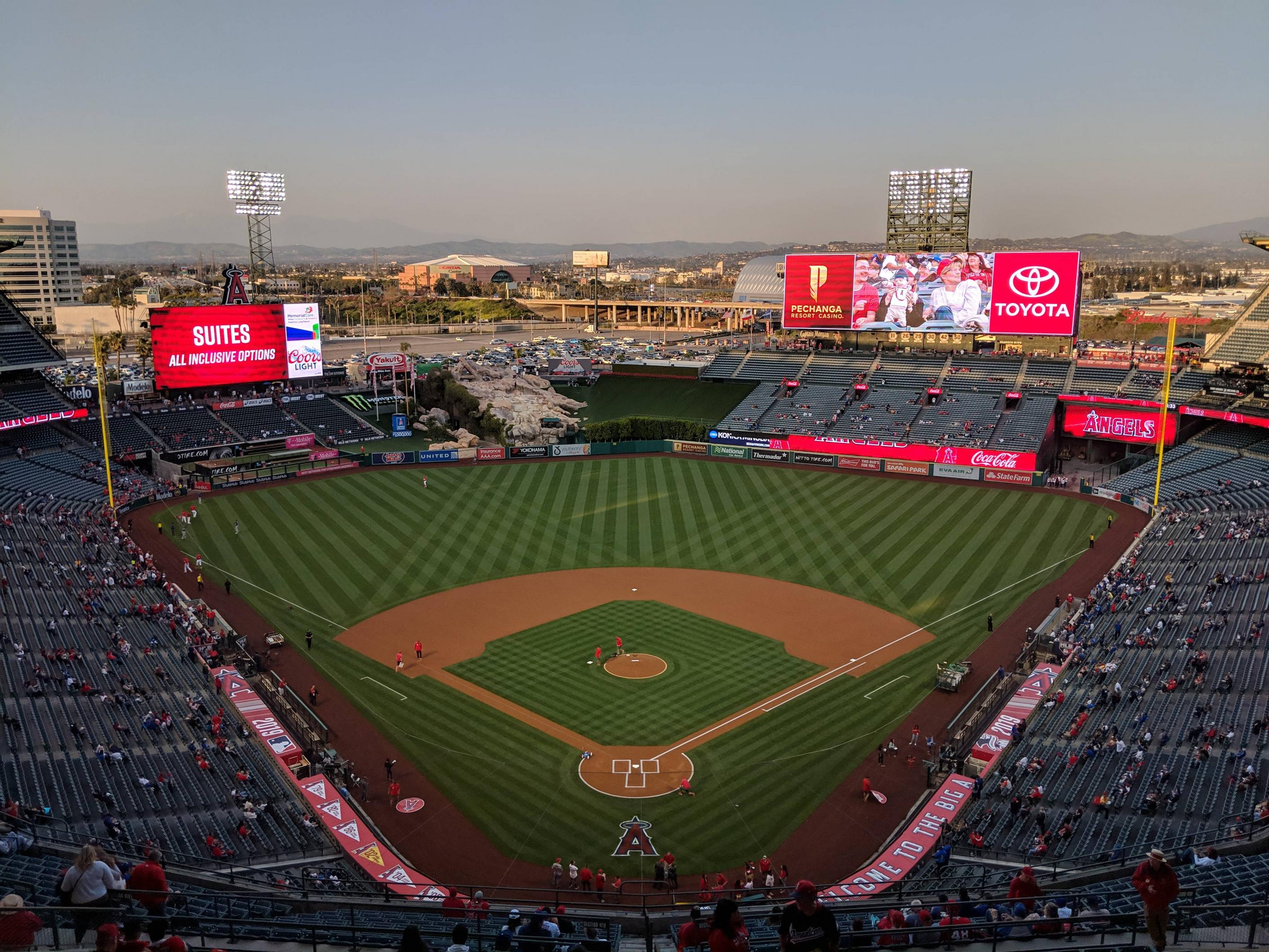
Angel Stadium has served as the home of the Los Angeles Angels since its opening in 1966

The Dodgers were founded in Brooklyn, New York in 1883; they officially adopted the name Dodgers in 1932. The team moved to Los Angeles before the 1958 season and played four consecutive seasons at Los Angeles Memorial Coliseum before they moved to their current home stadium, Dodger Stadium, in 1962. The Dodgers are one of the most valuable franchises in MLB. They have won nine World Series championships and 25 National League pennants. Eleven NL MVP award winners have played for the Dodgers, winning a total of 13 MVP Awards; eight Cy Young Award winners have also pitched for the Dodgers, winning a total of 12 awards. The team has also had 18 Rookie of the Year Award winners, twice as many as the next closest team, including four consecutive from 1979 to 1982 and five consecutive from 1992 to 1996. Los Angeles and the Dodgers hosted the MLB All-Star Game in the summer of 2022.

The Los Angeles Angels were established as one of the league's first two expansion teams in 1961 by Gene Autry. The Los Angeles Angels played their home games at Wrigley Field and moved in 1962 to newly built Dodger Stadium, which the Angels referred to as Chavez Ravine, where they were tenants of the Dodgers through 1965. In 1966, they moved to their current home, Angel Stadium in Anaheim. In 2002, the Angels won their first and only American League pennant and World Series when they defeated the San Francisco Giants 4–3. The Angels have had many award winners including seven AL MVP awards by four players, two Cy Young Award winners and three Rookie of the Year Award winners.

The city is also home to Los Angeles Queens of the Women's Professional Baseball League.

=== Basketball ===
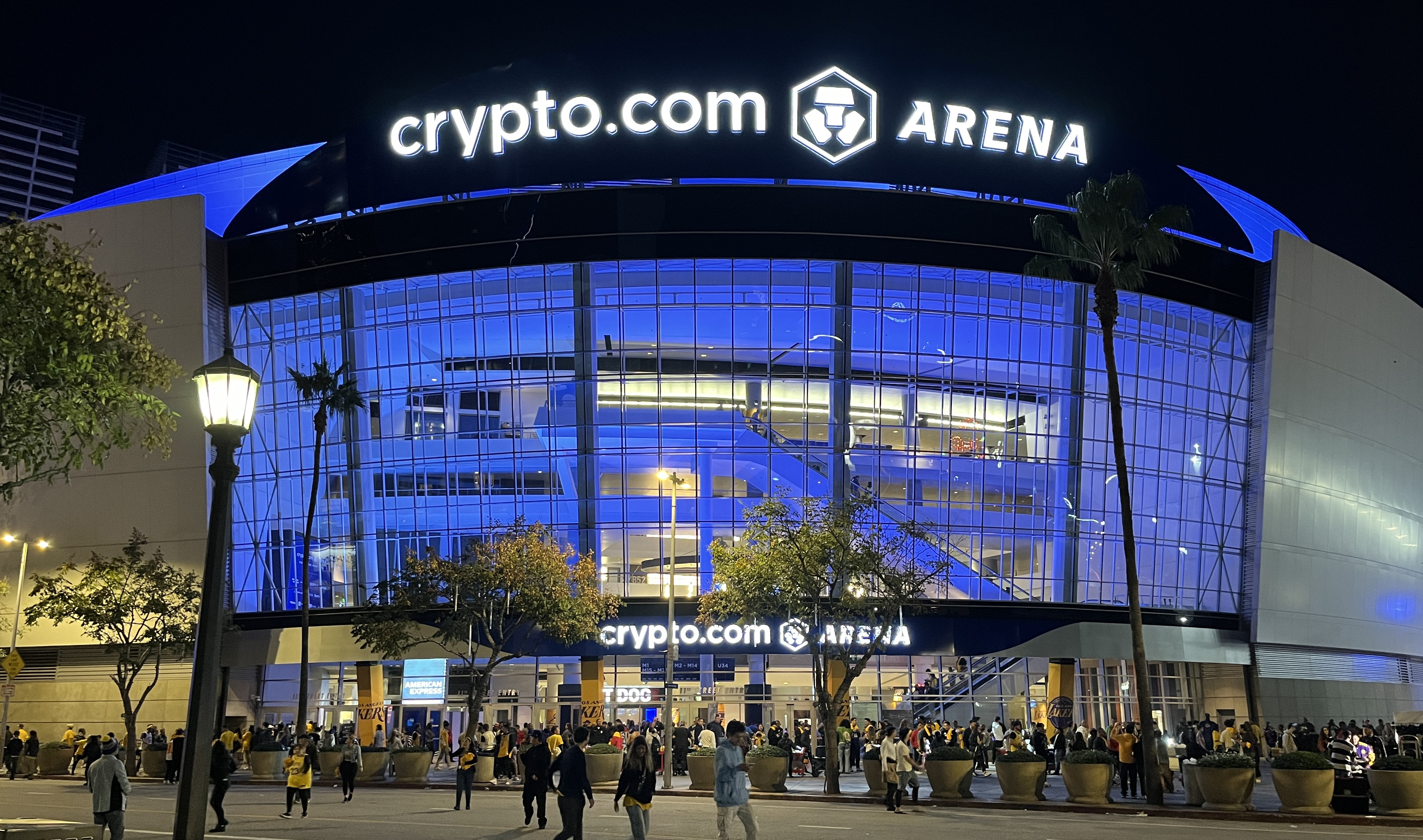
Crypto.com Arena is the current home to the Los Angeles Lakers and Los Angeles Sparks. The arena hosted the Los Angeles Clippers until 2024.

Los Angeles boasts two National Basketball Association (NBA) teams, the Los Angeles Lakers and the Los Angeles Clippers. Both shared the Crypto.com Arena (formerly the Staples Center) from 1999 to 2024. The Lakers are one of the most valuable franchises in the NBA and have gained a considerable fanbase over the years. They have the most championships of all current Los Angeles franchises, having gained 12 titles in Los Angeles and 17 overall, the second-most in the NBA behind the Boston Celtics who have 18. The Lakers were founded as the Minneapolis Lakers, having moved to Southern California in 1960.

The Los Angeles Clippers were founded as the Buffalo Braves in 1970; in 1978, the team moved to San Diego and changed the nickname to Clippers; the team relocated from San Diego in 1984. They were one of three expansion teams to join the NBA that year, along with the Cleveland Cavaliers and Portland Trail Blazers. The Braves saw some success and reached the playoffs three times, led by league Most Valuable Player (MVP) Bob McAdoo. Conflicts with the Canisius Golden Griffins over the Buffalo Memorial Auditorium and the sale of the franchise led to them relocating from Buffalo to San Diego.

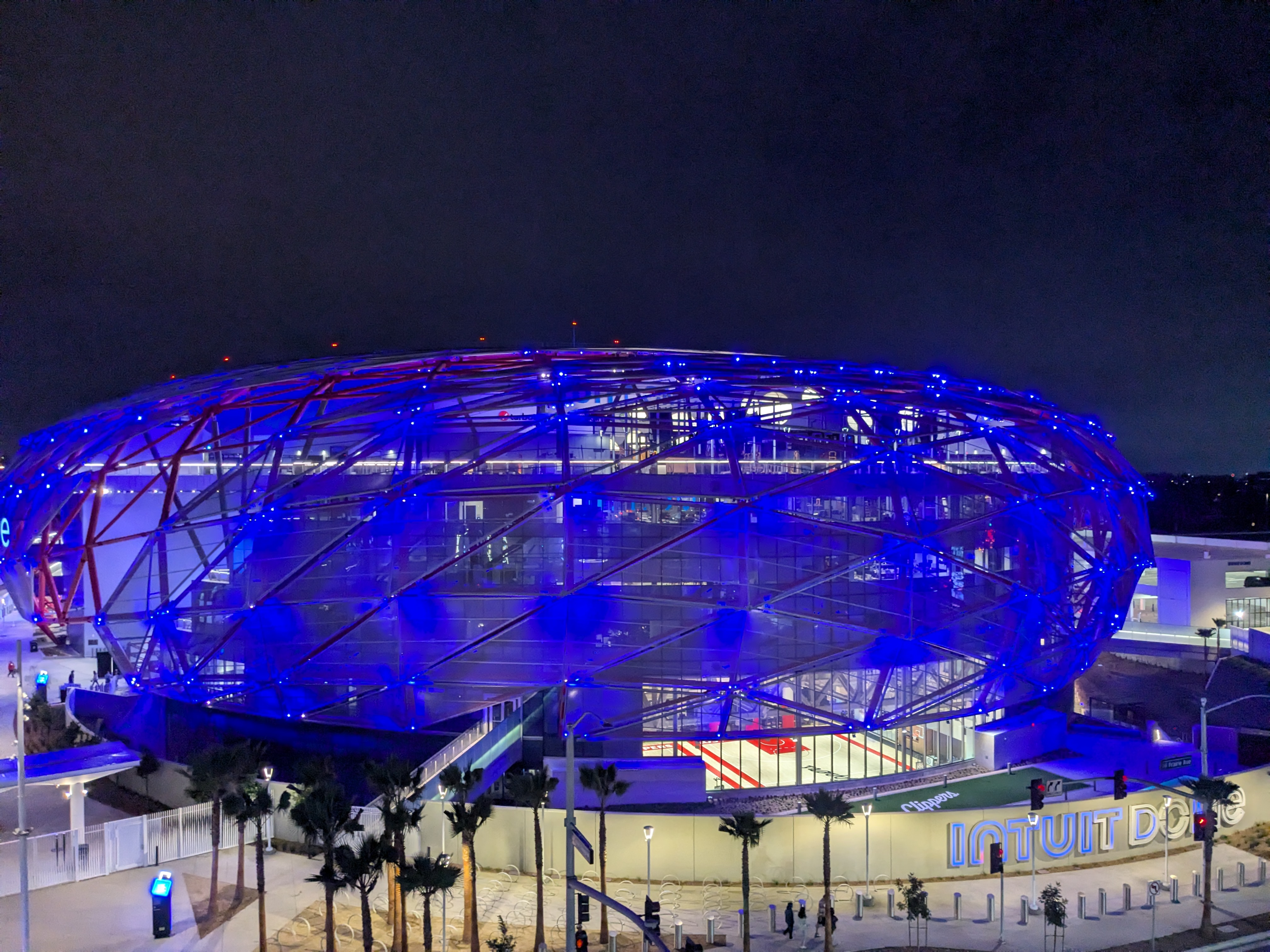
Intuit Dome is the current home of the Los Angeles Clippers

When he died in 2013, Lakers owner Jerry Buss also owned the city's WNBA franchise, the Los Angeles Sparks, which also plays at Crypto.com Arena. His family still owns the Lakers, but has since sold the Sparks to Guggenheim Partners, the current owners of the Dodgers. One year later, longtime Clippers owner Donald Sterling was banned from the NBA after derogatory statements he made became public, and was subsequently forced to sell the team. The franchise was purchased by former Microsoft executive Steve Ballmer in August 2014. The Clippers built a new arena, Intuit Dome, in Inglewood, across from SoFi Stadium in 2024 when their lease with Crypto.com Arena expired.

=== Football ===
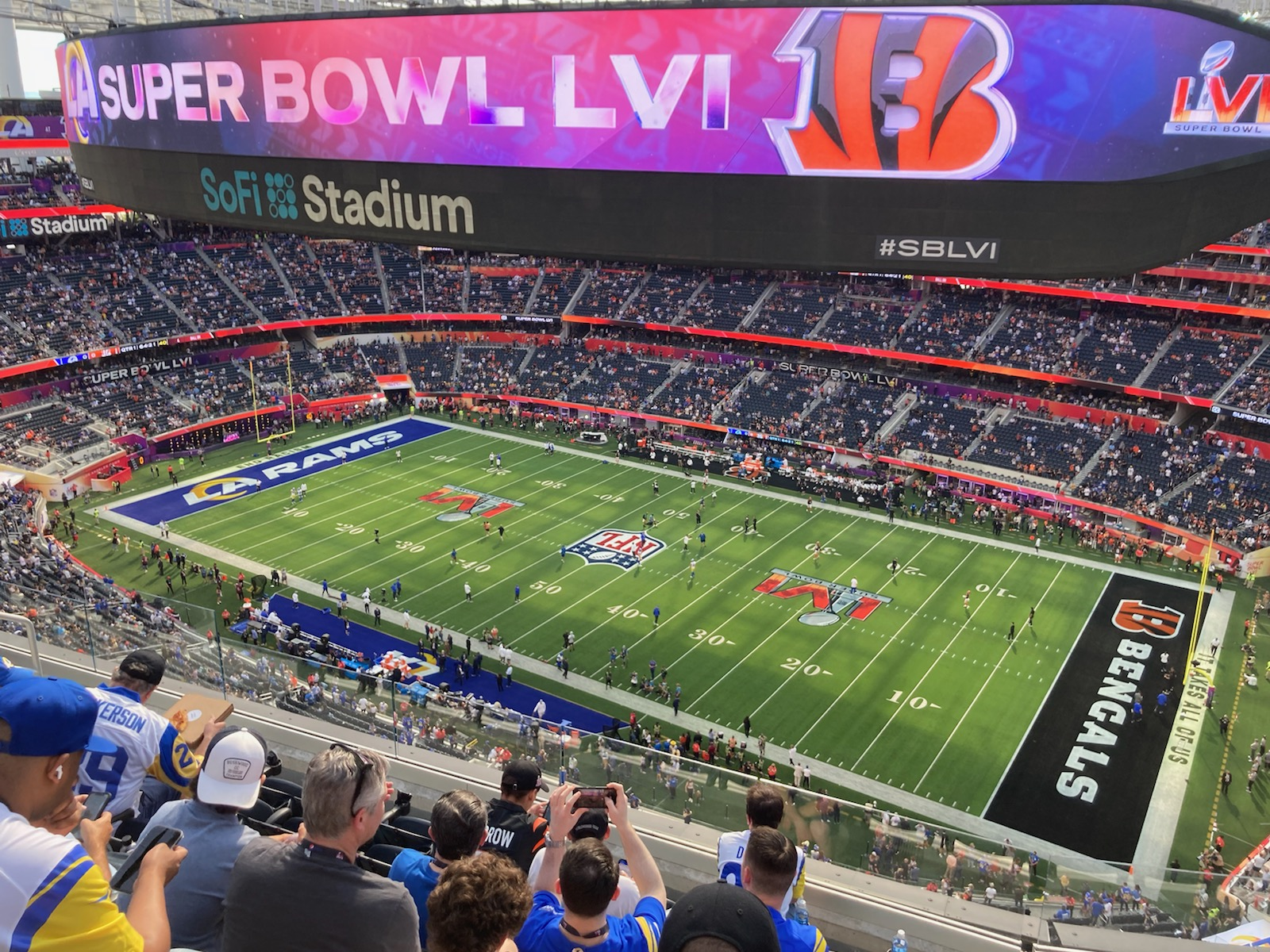
Interior of SoFi Stadium, home of the Los Angeles Rams and Los Angeles Chargers during Super Bowl LVI.

The region has two National Football League (NFL) teams: the Los Angeles Rams and the Los Angeles Chargers. The Rams originally played in Los Angeles from 1946 to 1994, while the Chargers shared Los Angeles with them for only one season in 1960 before moving to San Diego.

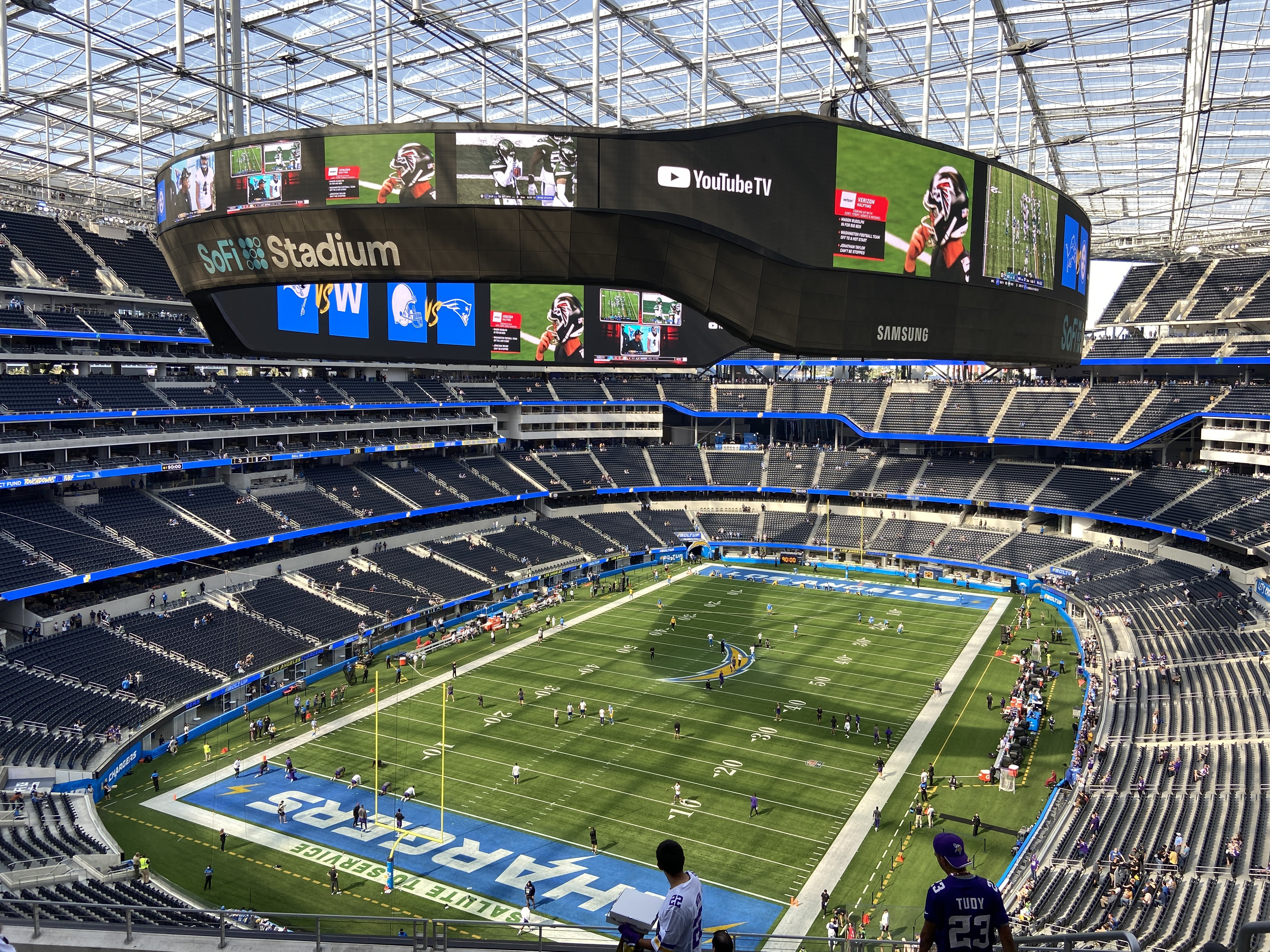
SoFi Stadium during a Los Angeles Chargers game.

Los Angeles did not have an NFL team in between the 1994 season and the 2016 season. Immediately after the 1994 season, the Los Angeles Rams moved from suburban Anaheim, California, to St. Louis, Missouri, and the Los Angeles Raiders returned to Oakland, California, after playing 13 years in the Los Angeles Memorial Coliseum (1982–1994) and winning Super Bowl XVIII. Between 1995 and 2016, there were multiple failed stadium proposals to bring back the NFL to Los Angeles and teams threatening to move in. On January 12, 2016, NFL owners voted 30–2 to allow the then St. Louis Rams to move back to Los Angeles and allow for the construction of the stadium proposed by Rams owner Stan Kroenke over a plan proposed by the Oakland Raiders and the San Diego Chargers. The Chargers would still follow through with a move to Los Angeles a year later in 2017. The Rams and Chargers play their home games at the 70,240-seat SoFi Stadium in Inglewood. 2017 marked the first time since 1960 that the Rams and Chargers shared the same market and the first time since 1994 that the market had two NFL teams. The Los Angeles Rams won Super Bowl LVI at SoFi Stadium in 2022 making them only the second NFL team to win the Super Bowl on home turf after the Tampa Bay Buccaneers in 2020.

Prior to the NFL, Los Angeles had multiple teams in the American Football League. The Los Angeles Wildcats, also called "Wilson Wildcats", were a traveling team for the first AFL in 1926. The Los Angeles Bulldogs were members of AFL II (1937) and a minor AFL (1939) before joining the Pacific Coast Professional Football League. The original Los Angeles Chargers were a charter member of AFL IV, becoming the San Diego Chargers in 1961. The Los Angeles Mustangs were members of the short-lived American Football League in 1944. From 1983 to 1985, the Los Angeles Express was a team in the United States Football League.

=== Ice hockey ===
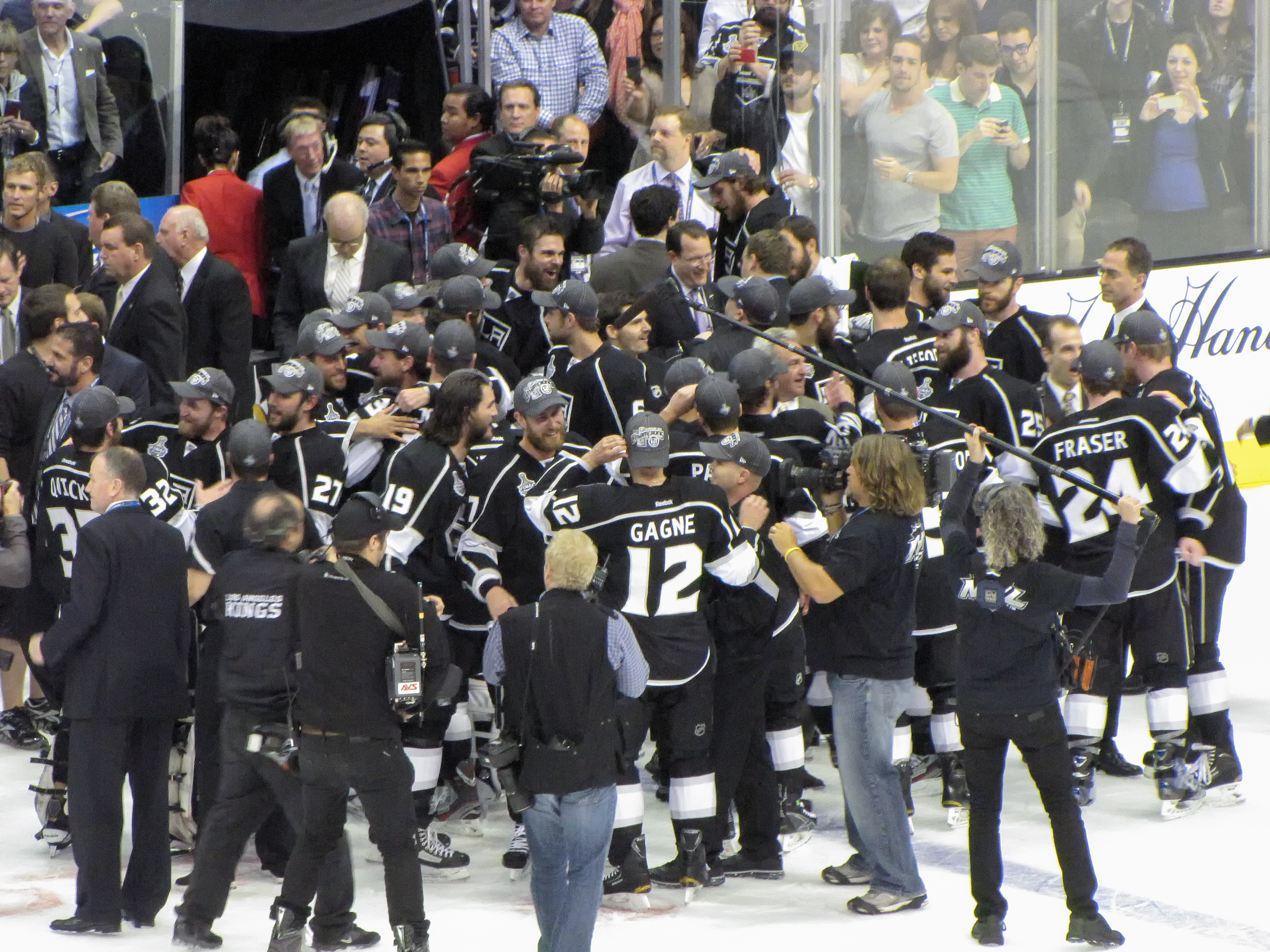
Los Angeles Kings Full Team celebration following the 2012 Stanley Cup Final

The region has two NHL teams — the Los Angeles Kings, which entered the league when it doubled in size in 1967, and the Anaheim Ducks, which joined in 1993 as the Mighty Ducks of Anaheim.

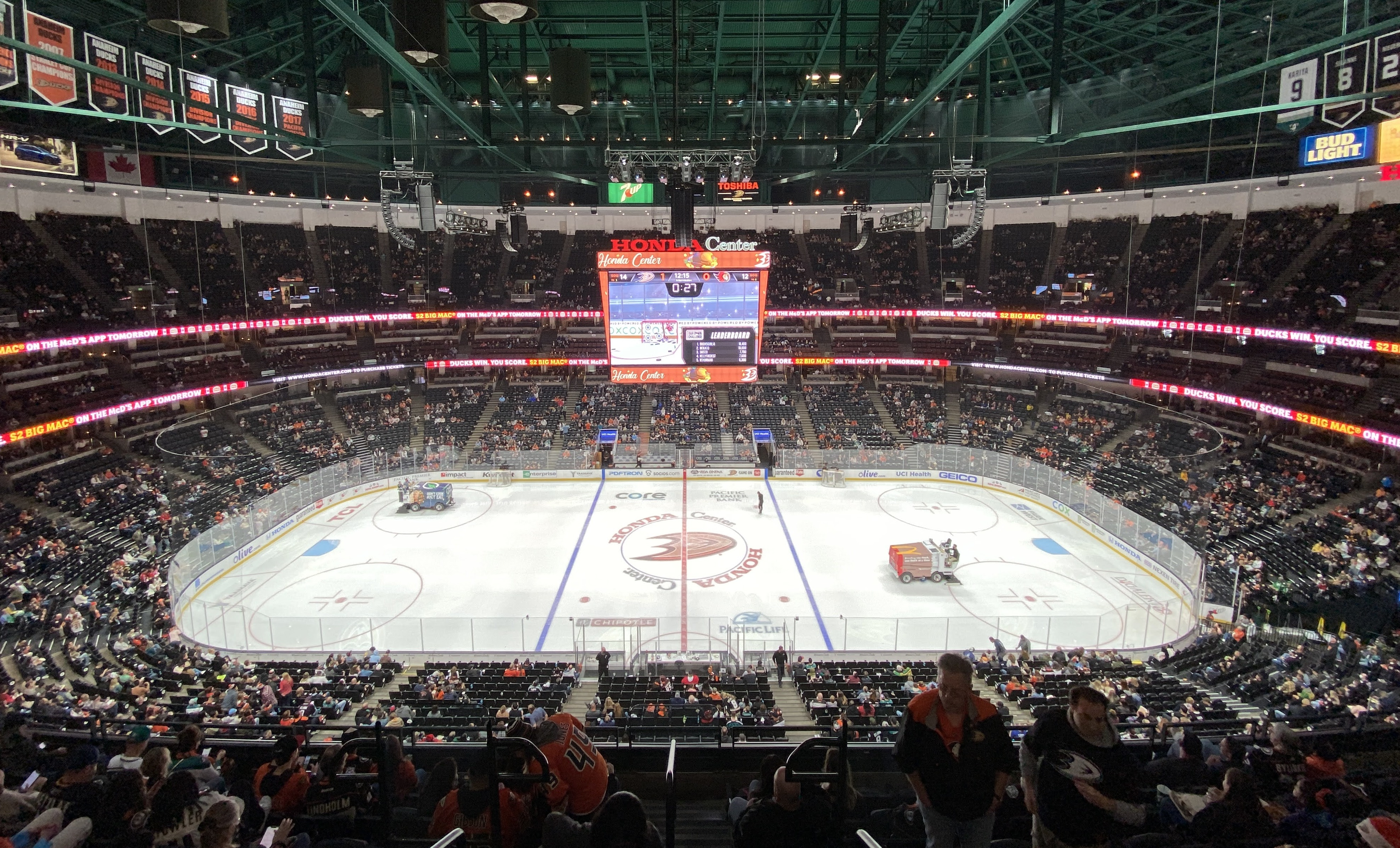
Honda Center serves as the home of the Anaheim Ducks.

The Kings were founded on June 5, 1967, after Jack Kent Cooke was awarded an NHL expansion franchise for Los Angeles on February 9, 1966, becoming one of the six teams that began play as part of the 1967 NHL expansion. Prior to the Kings arrival in the Los Angeles area, both the Pacific Coast Hockey League (PCHL) and the Western Hockey League (WHL) had several teams in California, including the PCHL's Los Angeles Monarchs of the 1930s and the WHL's Los Angeles Blades of the 1960s. The Kings have won two Stanley Cup titles in 2012 and 2014.

The Ducks were founded in 1993 by The Walt Disney Company with an entrance fee of $50 million, half of which Disney paid to the Los Angeles Kings as compensation for sharing the Southern California NHL market. On March 1, 1993, at the brand-new Anaheim Arena – located a short distance east of Disneyland and across the Orange Freeway from Angel Stadium – the team received its name, inspired by the 1992 Disney movie The Mighty Ducks. As a result of the name adoption, the arena was named "The Pond", and Disney subsequently made an animated series called Mighty Ducks, featuring a fictional Mighty Ducks of Anaheim team consisting of anthropomorphized ducks led by the Mighty Ducks' mascot, Wildwing. The Ducks have won the Stanley Cup once in 2007.

=== Soccer ===
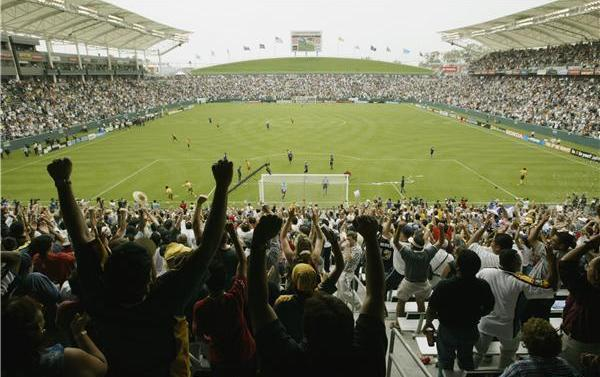
Dignity Health Sports Park serves as home to the LA Galaxy.

The Los Angeles area hosts two teams in Major League Soccer (MLS), the top flight of the men's sport in the United States: the LA Galaxy, a charter member of the league, and Los Angeles FC, which began play in 2018. The Galaxy have won six MLS Cups, more than any other MLS team. The two teams play in "El Tráfico", the cross-town derby. Chivas USA was a member of Major League Soccer starting in 2005, but was shut down by the league in 2014.

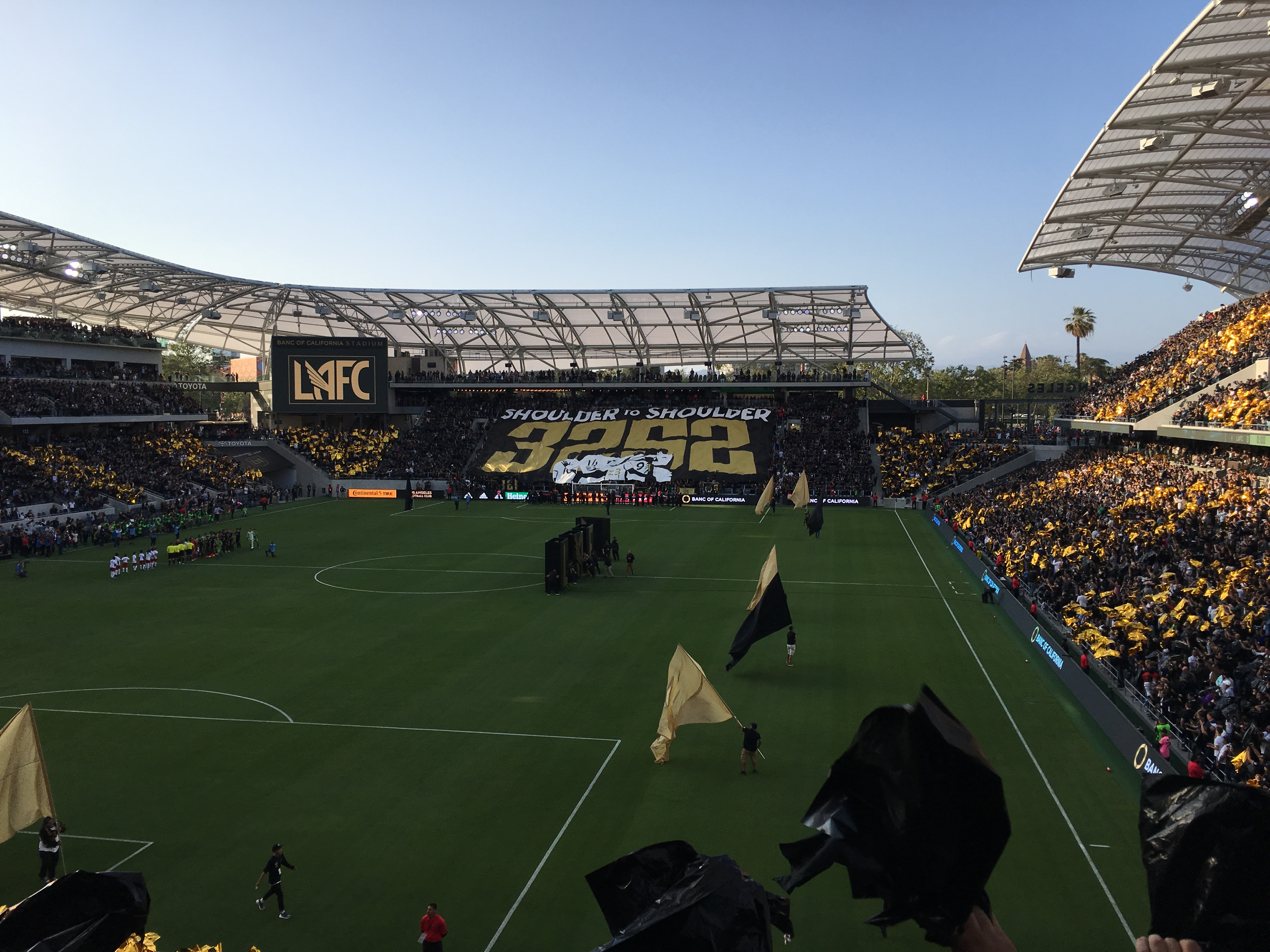
BMO Stadium serves as home to Los Angeles FC and Angel City FC.

Before MLS was created, the Los Angeles Wolves of the United Soccer Association (USA) and the Los Angeles Toros of the National Professional Soccer League (NPSL) both had its first season in 1967. The Wolves won the USA Final in 1967, defeating the Washington Whips 6–5 at the Los Angeles Memorial Coliseum. When both leagues merged to form the North American Soccer League (NASL), the Wolves remained in Los Angeles while the Toros relocated and became the San Diego Toros in 1968. When the first season ended, both teams folded. Later, the NASL returned a team to Los Angeles by establishing the Los Angeles Aztecs in 1974, but folded in 1981. In their first season as an expansion franchise, the Aztecs captured the 1974 NASL championship, defeating the Miami Toros in a penalty shoot-out after a 3–3 draw. Notable players for the Aztecs include Manchester United's George Best and Dutch superstar Johan Cruyff. Anaheim was represented in the NASL by the California Surf from 1978 to 1981.

The Los Angeles Lazers was owned by Jerry Buss and played in the MISL from 1982 to 1988. Buss again owned the Los Angeles United in the CISL but after one season (1993) sold the team. The United relocated to Anaheim and became Anaheim Splash playing from 1993 - 1997 then folding as well.

Los Angeles has many amateur teams that have competed for the U.S. Open Cup, the annual club championship for all men's teams in the United States. These teams, along with their MLS successors, made 25 total appearances in the competition's finals from 1955 to 2024.

The area has one past and one current team in U.S. women's professional soccer. The Los Angeles Sol played one season (2009) of Women's Professional Soccer before folding. The area then went more than a decade without a top-flight team, either in WPS or in the current National Women's Soccer League, until an NWSL franchise was granted in 2020; the new side, since unveiled as Angel City FC, started play in March 2022.

=== Cricket ===
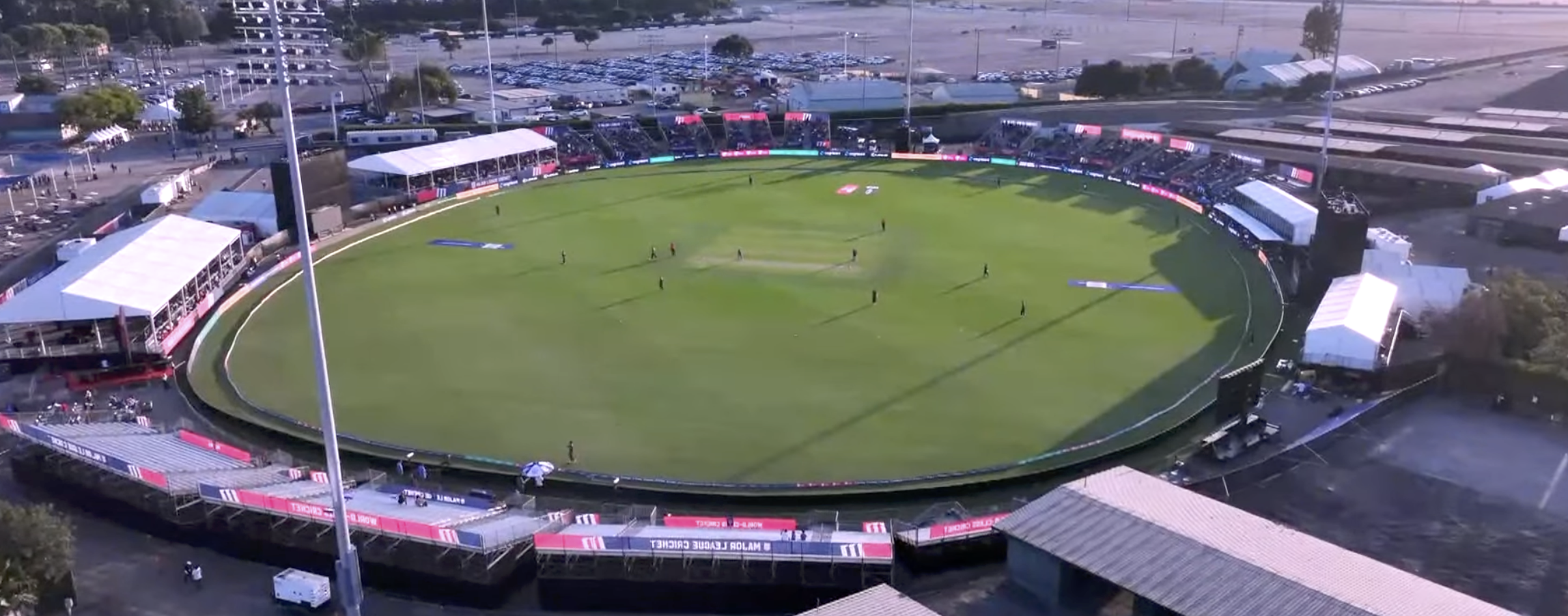
The Knight Riders Cricket Ground in Pomona opened in 2026.

The Los Angeles Knight Riders are one of 6 current teams in Major League Cricket that plays Twenty20 international league Major League Cricket launched in the US in 2023. Their home ground is the Knight Riders Cricket Ground in Pomona which opened in July 2026. They won their first MLC title in 2026.

== Major league professional championships ==
=== Los Angeles Rams (NFL) ===
1 NFL championship (pre–Super Bowl)

- 1951

1 Super Bowl title

- 2021 (LVI)

=== Los Angeles Raiders (NFL) ===
1 Super Bowl title

- 1983 (XVIII)

=== Los Angeles Wolves (NASL) ===
1 NASL Final title

- 1967

=== Los Angeles Aztecs (NASL) ===
1 NASL Final title

- 1974

=== Los Angeles Galaxy (MLS) ===
6 MLS Cup titles

- 2002
- 2005
- 2011
- 2012
- 2014
- 2024

=== Los Angeles FC (MLS) ===
1 MLS Cup title

- 2022

=== Los Angeles Dodgers (MLB) ===
8 World Series titles

- 1959
- 1963
- 1965
- 1981
- 1988
- 2020
- 2024
- 2025

=== Anaheim / Los Angeles Angels (MLB) ===
1 World Series titles

- 2002

=== Los Angeles Lakers (NBA) ===
12 NBA Finals titles

- 1972
- 1980
- 1982
- 1985
- 1987
- 1988
- 2000
- 2001
- 2002
- 2009
- 2010
- 2020

=== Los Angeles Kings (NHL) ===
2 Stanley Cup titles

- 2012
- 2014

=== Anaheim Ducks (NHL) ===
1 Stanley Cup title

- 2007

=== Los Angeles Sparks (WNBA) ===
3 WNBA Finals titles

- 2001
- 2002
- 2016

=== Los Angeles Knight Riders (MLC) ===
1 Major League Cricket title

- 2026

=== Los Angeles Queens (WPBL) ===
1 Women’s Pro Baseball League title

- 2026

== 21st Century success ==
Since the turn of the century, the Los Angeles area's professional sports teams have won 25 championships: 6 by the Lakers (2000, 2001, 2002, 2009, 2010, and 2020), the Galaxy (2002, 2005, 2011, 2012, 2014, and 2024), 3 by the Dodgers (2020, 2024, and 2025), the Sparks (2001, 2002, and 2016), 2 by the Kings (2012 and 2014), 1 by Los Angeles FC (2022), the Rams (LVI (2021)), the Ducks (2007), the Angels (2002) and the Knight Riders (2026). Their sports teams have also appeared an additional 11 times as league finalists: 2 by the Galaxy (2001 and 2009), the Lakers (2004 and 2008), the Dodgers (2017 and 2018), and the Sparks (2003 and 2017), 1 by Los Angeles FC (2023), the Rams (LIII (2018)), and the Ducks (2003). Los Angeles joined Boston as the only other city in the 21st century to see a team in each of the "Big Four" leagues win a championship. If MLS is counted, Los Angeles would be the first city to see a team in each of the "Big Four" and MLS win a championship in the 21st century.

== Other sports in Los Angeles ==
=== Mixed Martial Arts (MMA) ===
The sport of Mixed Martial Arts (in the U.S.) was first conceived of and created in the Los Angeles area. Rorion Gracie and Art Davie co-created the MMA promotion, the Ultimate Fighting Championship (the UFC), in 1993 out of Torrance, CA, under the War of the Worlds (W.O.W.) promotion company. The sport of Mixed Martial Arts slowly developed in its first decade. By the year 2005, the UFC had grown into a viable fight promotion company and the sport of MMA was on its way to becoming a mainstream sport in the U.S. and around the world.

In its relatively brief history, the sport of MMA has been well represented by fighters natives of Los Angeles and of California. From Frank Shamrock (Los Angeles) and Tito Oritz (Huntington Beach) in the early era of the sport, to Gilbert Melendez (Santa Ana) and Dan Henderson (Downey) throughout the mid-era of the sport, to Ronda Rousey (Riverside), Henry Cejudo (Los Angeles), Tony Ferguson (Oxnard) as of late.

=== Surfing ===
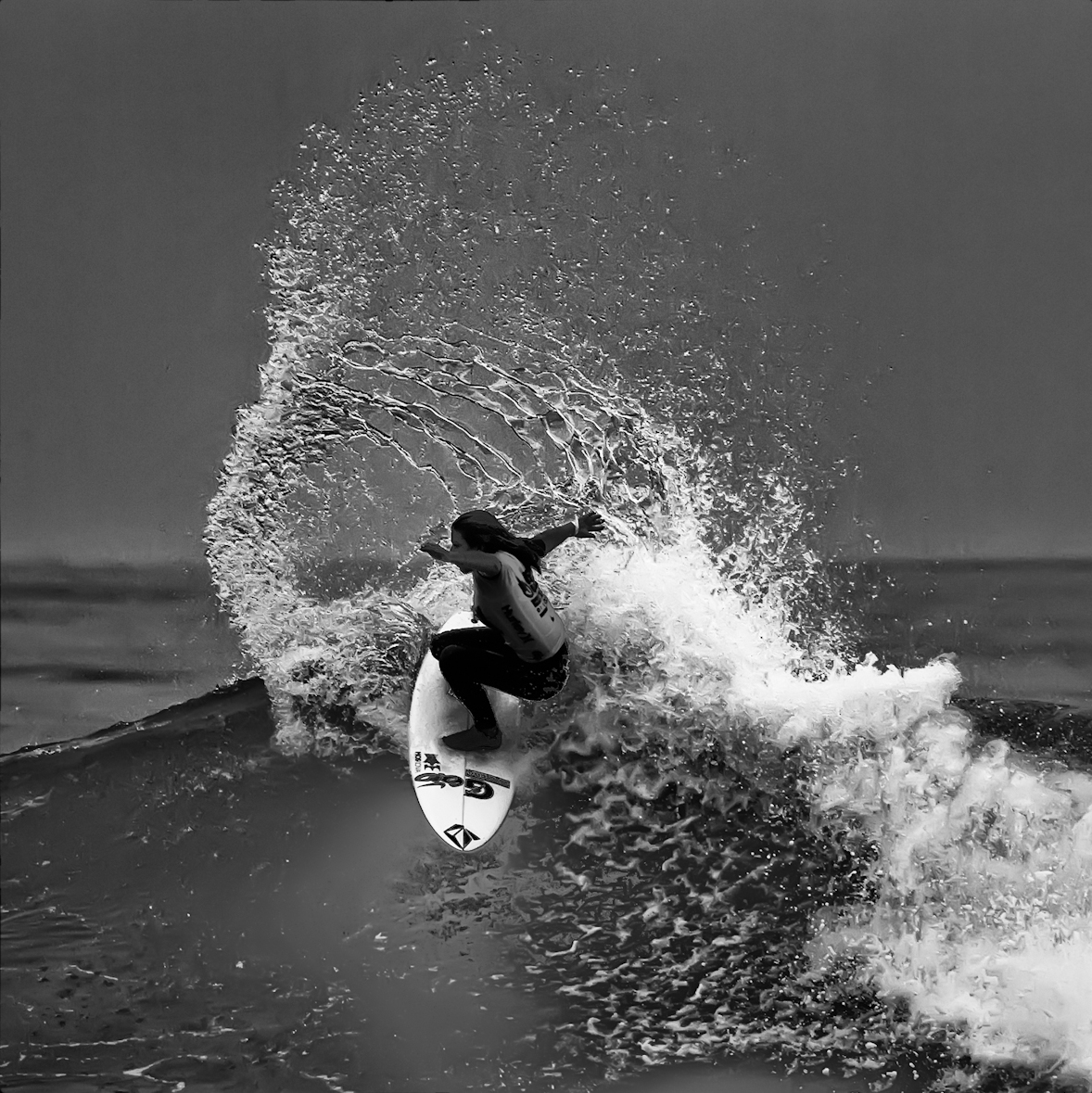
Huntington Beach US Surfing Open

The warm mediterranean climate as well as the miles of a scenic coastline with a variety of wave types from Malibu to the South Bay, Los Angeles is one of the favorite destinations to both amateurs and professional surfers across the world. Every summer of each year, Huntington Beach hosts the US Open of Surfing, the largest surfing competition in the world. Many other surfing events including the International Surf Festival, Surfing Dog Contests, and Ventura's Surf Rodeo are held annually in several Los Angeles County beach cities.

=== Beach Volleyball ===
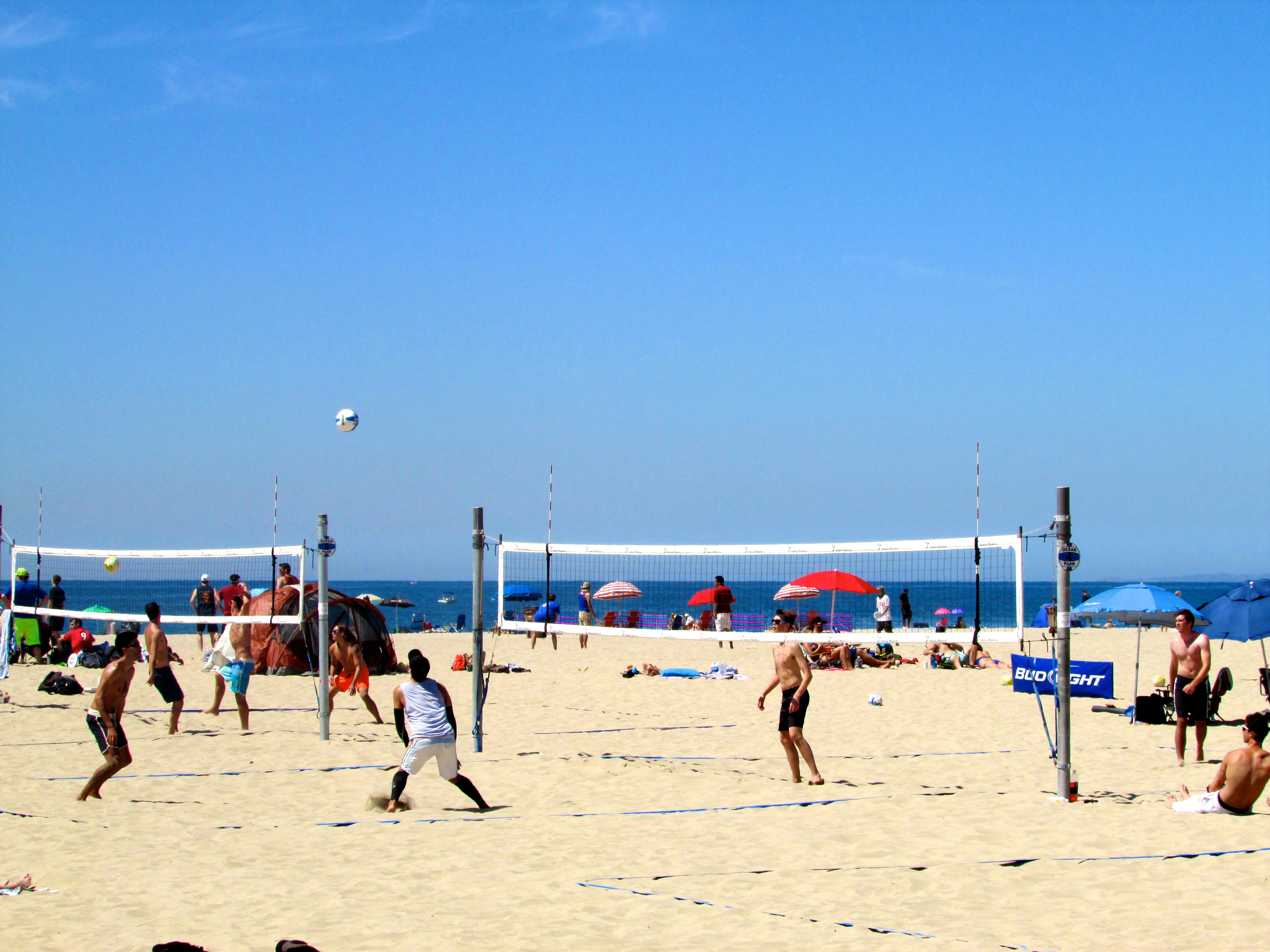
Santa Monica Beach is considered to be the birthplace of Beach Volleyball

Santa Monica is believed to be the birthplace of beach volleyball in the early 1920s. The weather, the vast sand area and the abundant permanent courts make Los Angeles one of the hotspots for beach volleyball. The first official Beach Volleyball World Championships was held in Los Angeles in from 10 to 13, 1997. Beach Volleyball has been an official Olympic sport since 1996, and during the 2028 Olympics, beach volleyball will be played as an Olympic sport for the first time in the city of Los Angeles. Additionally, many other local beach volleyball tournaments for players of all skill levels are held by multiple entities in various beaches across the Los Angeles metropolitan area. In 2017, CBVA, California Beach Volleyball Association, hosted nearly 1,000 tournaments at 23 beaches in 11 skill or age divisions. There are approximately 8,000 members from California and beyond.

== Minor league and semi-professional teams ==
=== American football ===
The Los Angeles Wildcats were an XFL team that began play in the league's inaugural 2020 season at Dignity Health Sports Park. The Los Angeles Xtreme were a member of the original XFL begun by Vince McMahon of World Wrestling Entertainment and by NBC, a major television network in the United States. The team played its home games in the Los Angeles Memorial Coliseum in the spring of 2001 and won the only championship in XFL history as the league folded after only one season.

Before the Arena Football League collapsed after the 2008 season, the league included the Los Angeles Cobras, the Anaheim Piranhas, and the Los Angeles Avengers. The Cobras played one season at the Los Angeles Sports Arena before folding, mostly due to lack of attendance. The Piranhas played at the then named Arrowhead Pond for two seasons, 1996 and 1997, before folding. The Avengers played their home games at the Staples Center until they folded as well. The AFL was revived in 2010 and returned to the Los Angeles area in 2014 with a new team, the Los Angeles Kiss. The team, owned by a group that included Gene Simmons and Paul Stanley, members of the rock band Kiss, played in Anaheim at the Honda Center until folding in 2016.

=== Australian rules football ===
In Australian rules football, the Los Angeles Dragons and the Orange County Giants of the United States Australian Football League both play in the Greater Los Angeles region.

=== Baseball ===
The collegiate level East Los Angeles Dodgers and their rival the Orange County Angels in the Southern California Collegiate Baseball League. The Los Angeles area is home to the Inland Empire 66ers, Lake Elsinore Storm, Ontario Tower Buzzers, and Rancho Cucamonga Quakes minor league baseball teams. They all play in the Single A California League and are affiliates of the Mariners, Padres, Dodgers, and Angels respectively.

=== Basketball ===
The metropolitan area has one team in the NBA G League; and is owned by one of the area's two NBA teams. The Coachella Valley Lakers play in Thousand Palms. The Los Angeles Blue Waves of the United States Basketball League play at Los Angeles Southwest College.

Previously, the Anaheim Arsenal played in the region for three season from 2006 to 2009 before relocating to Springfield, Massachusetts and the Ontario Clippers played in the region for seven seasons from 2017 to 2024 before relocating to Oceanside, California as the San Diego Clippers.

=== Cricket ===
The official Minor League Cricket from Los Angeles is the Los Angeles Lashings. The Los Angeles Lashings are an American professional Twenty20 cricket team from Los Angeles which competes in Minor League Cricket (MiLC) and other T20 Cricket tournaments across the USA. Los Angeles Lashings was named in 2020 as part of the 24 original teams to compete in Minor League Cricket USA. The franchise is co-owned by Abhimanyu Rajp and Deepak Gosain.

=== eSports ===
The Los Angeles Thieves (or LA Thieves) are an American professional Call of Duty League (CDL) esports team based in Los Angeles, California. The team is owned by 100 Thieves. The Thieves won the 2022 world championship and have won five stage titles.

Founded in 2017, Los Angeles Valiant and Los Angeles Gladiators were two of twelve founding members of the OWL. Both operations were suspended until it shutdown of the Overwatch League in 2023.

=== Gaelic football ===
The amateur sport of Gaelic football has been played in Los Angeles since the early 20th century. Los Angeles were national champions in 1959.

The Cougars GFC were founded in 2015 and play and train on the westside of Los Angeles. Primarily in Culver City/Santa Monica area. The Cougars season consists of attending tournaments in nearby San Diego, Colorado and the annual USGAA Nationals Championship. As of 2018, the Cougars membership consisted of approximately 50 members (male and female) with the club being 55% American, 45% Irish, some being complete beginners.

The Cougars also play in a 3-game series against their local rivals, The Wild Geese Gaelic Football Club, Inc. founded in 1978 who administers Gaelic football activities in nearby Orange County.

=== Ice hockey ===
The Ontario Reign was an ECHL team from 2008 to 2015. After a team swap with Manchester, New Hampshire, the new Ontario Reign began play in the American Hockey League in 2015. In 1995 IHL Los Angeles Ice Dogs played one season 1995–1996 at the Los Angeles Memorial Sports Arena. Due to lack of attendance, moved to the Long Beach Arena for the 1996–1997 season and became the Long Beach Ice Dogs through 2007. The team played in three different 2nd-division professional hockey leagues during their time in Los Angeles/Long Beach; IHL 1995–2000, WCHL 2000–2003, & the ECHL 2003–2007.

=== Lacrosse ===
Major League Lacrosse was represented with the Los Angeles Riptide from 2006 to 2008. The Anaheim Storm was a member of the indoor National Lacrosse League. They played at the Arrowhead Pond, now the Honda Center from 2004 to 2005. After the 2005 season, the Storm suspended operations due to low attendance

=== Rugby league ===
Los Angeles has two rugby league teams, the Los Angeles Roosters and Los Angeles Mongrel, both a member of the USA Rugby League and Pacific Coast Rugby League.

=== Rugby union ===
The Los Angeles area has had several amateur clubs. It is home to the Santa Monica Rugby Club, which competes in the Pacific Rugby Premiership and is a member of USA Rugby. The Los Angeles Rugby Club is the second oldest club in the Southern California Rugby Football Union. The club was founded in 1958 as the Universities Rugby Club. Founding members included Al Williams and Dick Hyland, members of the Gold Medal-winning 1924 USA Olympic Rugby Team. Other rugby clubs include the LA Rebellion and the San Fernando Valley Rugby Club.

In 2021, the area added its first professional club in the LA Giltinis, an expansion team in Major League Rugby, but they would disband in 2022. In 2024, MLR would come back to Los Angeles as Rugby ATL relocated from Atlanta to Los Angeles which was called Rugby Football Club Los Angeles, though they merged with the San Diego Legion to become the California Legion in 2026.

=== Soccer ===
The Los Angeles area also has multiple clubs in the USL Championship, MLS Next Pro, USL League Two, the National Independent Soccer Association, the United Premier Soccer League and the National Premier Soccer League scattered throughout the region: Orange County SC, Los Angeles FC 2, Ventura County FC, Santa Ana Winds FC, LA Wolves FC, Moreno Valley FC, FC Golden State Force, Southern California Seahorses, Ventura County Fusion, City of Angels FC, Deportivo Coras USA, Orange County FC, Oxnard Guerreros FC, SoCal SC, and Temecula FC, to name some.

In addition, the Santa Clarita Blue Heat play in United Women's Soccer.

=== Tennis ===
The Los Angeles Spinners, formerly known as the Seattle Spinners, are a professional table tennis team based in Los Angeles, California. They compete in Major League Table Tennis (MLTT) as a member of the Western Division. Originally founded in 2023, the franchise is a founding member of the first professional team-based table tennis league in the United States.

=== Ultimate ===
The Los Angeles Aviators were a member of the twenty-four team Ultimate Frisbee Association (UFA), a professional Ultimate Frisbee league spanning the United States and Canada. The Aviators were one of six teams currently competing in the South Division, and play a twelve-game regular season against the five other teams in the division: Austin Sol, San Diego Growlers, Houston Havoc, Atlanta Hustle, and the Carolina Flyers. They suspended operations on November 12, 2025.

The Los Angeles Astra, a women's and non-binary professional Ultimate Frisbee team, debut in 2019 as the Los Angeles 99's. They changed names to the Los Angeles Astra and competed as part of the Western Ultimate League. Their inaugural season in 2020 was canceled due to COVID-19, but they have since played several seasons in the Western Ultimate League. The Astra joined the Premier Ultimate League for the 2025 season. The Astra are one of six teams currently competing in the South Division, and play a six game regular season against the other teams in the division: Nashville Nightshade, Austin Torch, D.C. Shadow, Atlanta Soul, and Raleigh Radiance.

=== Former minor professional teams ===
Club	League	Last Venue	Years in L.A.	Championships
Anaheim Arsenal	NBA D-League	Anaheim Convention Center	2006–2009	0
Anaheim Bullfrogs	Roller Hockey International	Arrowhead Pond	1993–1999	3 (1993, 1997, 1998)
Anaheim Piranhas	Arena Football League	Arrowhead Pond	1996–1997	0
LA Giltinis	Major League Rugby	Los Angeles Memorial Coliseum	2020–2022	1 (2021)
Los Angeles Cobras	Arena Football League	Los Angeles Memorial Sports Arena	1988	0
Los Angeles Avengers	Arena Football League	Staples Center	2000–2009	0
Los Angeles Kiss	Arena Football League	Honda Center	2014–2016	0
Los Angeles Wildcats	XFL	Dignity Health Sports Park	2020	0
Los Angeles Xtreme	XFL	Los Angeles Memorial Coliseum	2001	1 (2001)
Los Angeles Blades	Roller Hockey International	Great Western Forum	1993–1997	0
Los Angeles Strings	World Team Tennis; TeamTennis	The Forum	1974–1978; 1981–1993	3 (1978, 1981, 1990)
Los Angeles Temptation	Legends Football League	Los Angeles Memorial Sports Arena; Los Angeles Memorial Coliseum; Toyota Arena	2004–2019	5 (2004, 2005, 2010, 2011, 2012)

== College ==
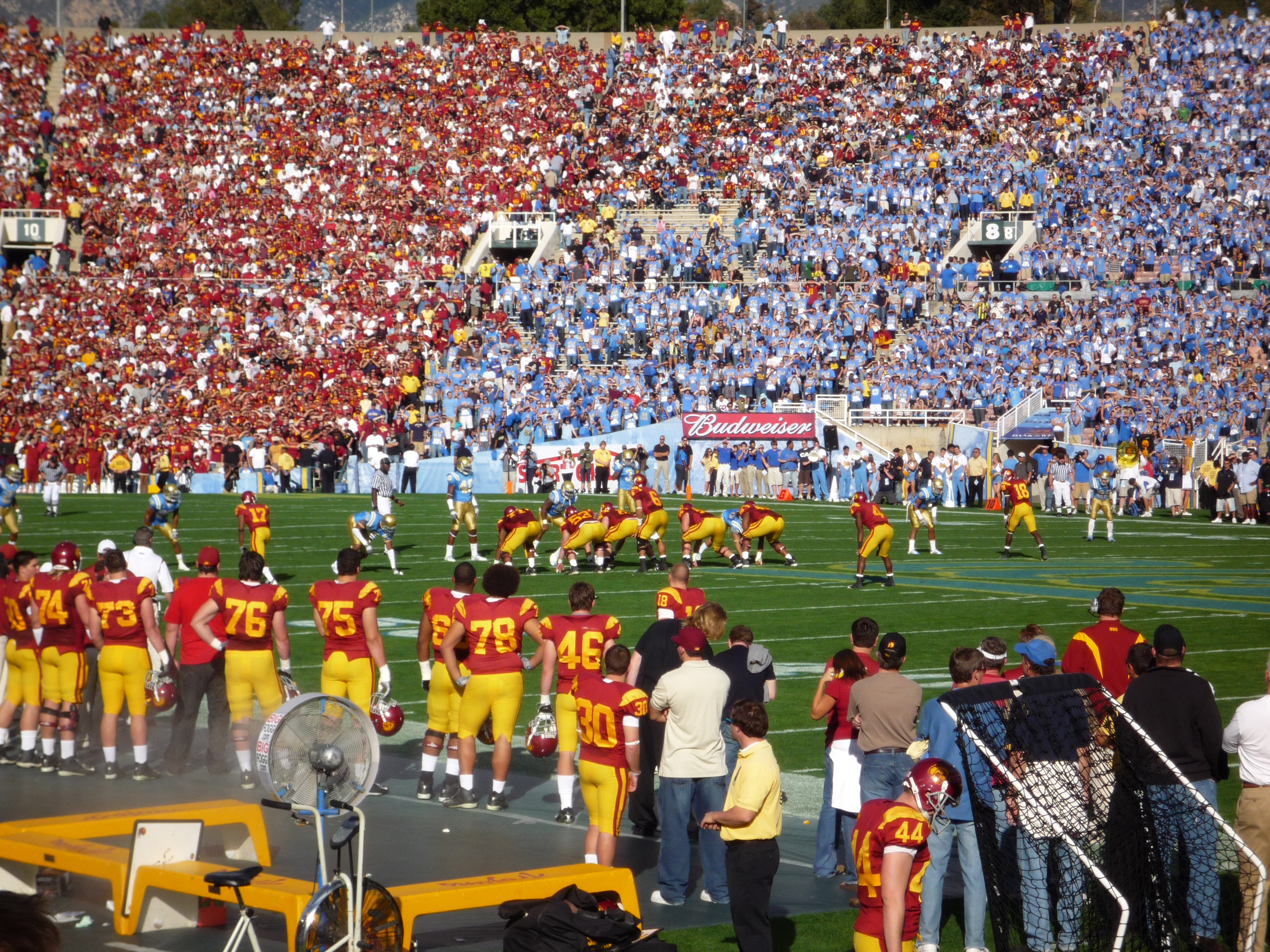
USC-UCLA football game at the Rose Bowl; the 2008 edition marked a return to the tradition of both teams wearing color jerseys.

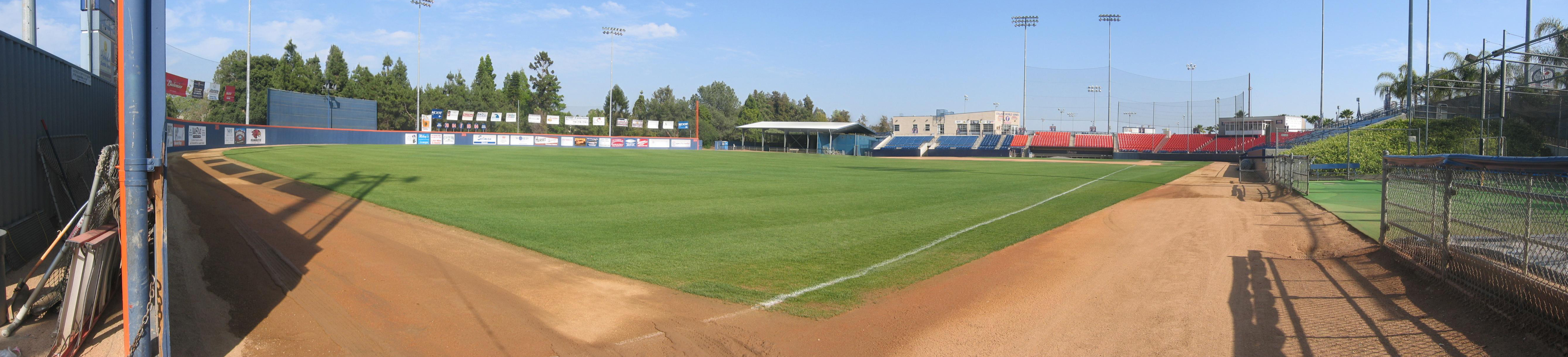
Cal State Fullerton Goodwin Field, home to CSUF Titan's baseball team. Besides being located in close proximity to each other, Long Beach State and the Cal State Fullerton Titans have competed heavily as conference rivals.

The metropolitan area boasts 10 NCAA Division I athletic programs. The best-known are the two whose football teams compete in the top-level Football Bowl Subdivision, both of which are in the city of Los Angeles proper:

- UCLA Bruins — Winners of 124 national team championships, and 273 individual national championships (397 total national championships).
- USC Trojans — Winners of 113 national team championships, and 412 individual national championships (525 total national championships).

USC has 11 national championships in football and 7 Heisman Trophy winners. In men's basketball, UCLA has won more titles than any other school (11). USC has also famously produced more Olympians, overall medalists, and gold medalists than any other American university. If USC were a country entering the 2016 Olympics, its record of 288 all-time medals would place it at rank 16 among all participating countries.

The area's other Division I programs are:

- Also in Los Angeles proper:
  - Cal State Northridge Matadors (or CSUN Matadors), in the San Fernando Valley
  - Loyola Marymount Lions, near Los Angeles International Airport
- In Los Angeles County:
  - Long Beach State Beach, or "The Beach", in Long Beach
  - Pepperdine Waves, in unincorporated Los Angeles County near Malibu:
- In Orange County:
  - Cal State Fullerton Titans
  - UC Irvine Anteaters
- In Riverside, one of the main cities of the Inland Empire:
  - California Baptist Lancers
  - UC Riverside Highlanders

== Venues ==
Los Angeles is home to some of the most famous sports venues in the world. Los Angeles venues have hosted generations of legendary athletes and historic games, including two Olympiads (3rd scheduled for 2028), eight Super Bowls (9th scheduled for 2027), the World Series, NBA and WNBA championships, the Stanley Cup, the FIFA World Cup, the MLS Cup, NCAA championships.

=== Dodger Stadium ===
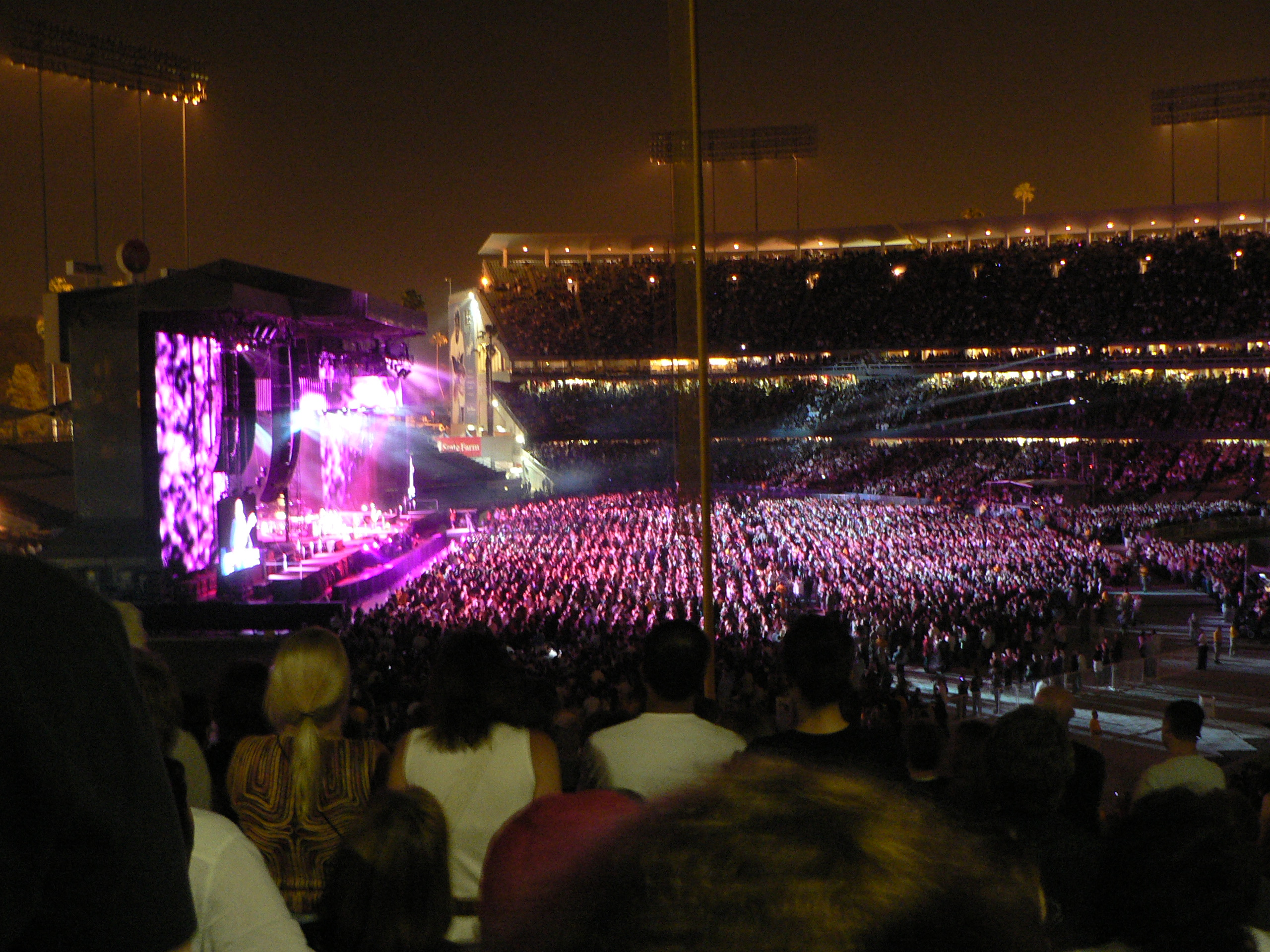
Dodger Stadium host many entertainment events

Dodger Stadium is located in the Elysian Park neighborhood of Los Angeles, is the home field of Major League Baseball's Los Angeles Dodgers. Opened on April 10, 1962, it was constructed in less than three years at a cost of US$ 23 million. It is the oldest ballpark in MLB west of the Mississippi River, and third-oldest overall, after Fenway Park in Boston (1912) and Wrigley Field in Chicago (1914), and is the world's largest baseball stadium by seat capacity. Often referred to as a "pitcher's ballpark", the stadium has seen twelve no-hitters, two of which were perfect games.

The stadium hosted the Major League Baseball All-Star Game in 1980 and 2022—as well as games of 12 World Series (1963, 1965, 1966, 1974, 1977, 1978, 1981, 1988, 2017, 2018, 2024, and 2025). It also hosted the semifinals and finals of the 2009 and 2017 World Baseball Classics. It also hosted exhibition baseball during the 1984 Summer Olympics. It will also host baseball and softball during the 2028 Summer Olympics. The stadium is also one of the greatest entertainment venues in the country, hosting special events that range from the Beatles to the Pope.

=== Los Angeles Memorial Coliseum ===
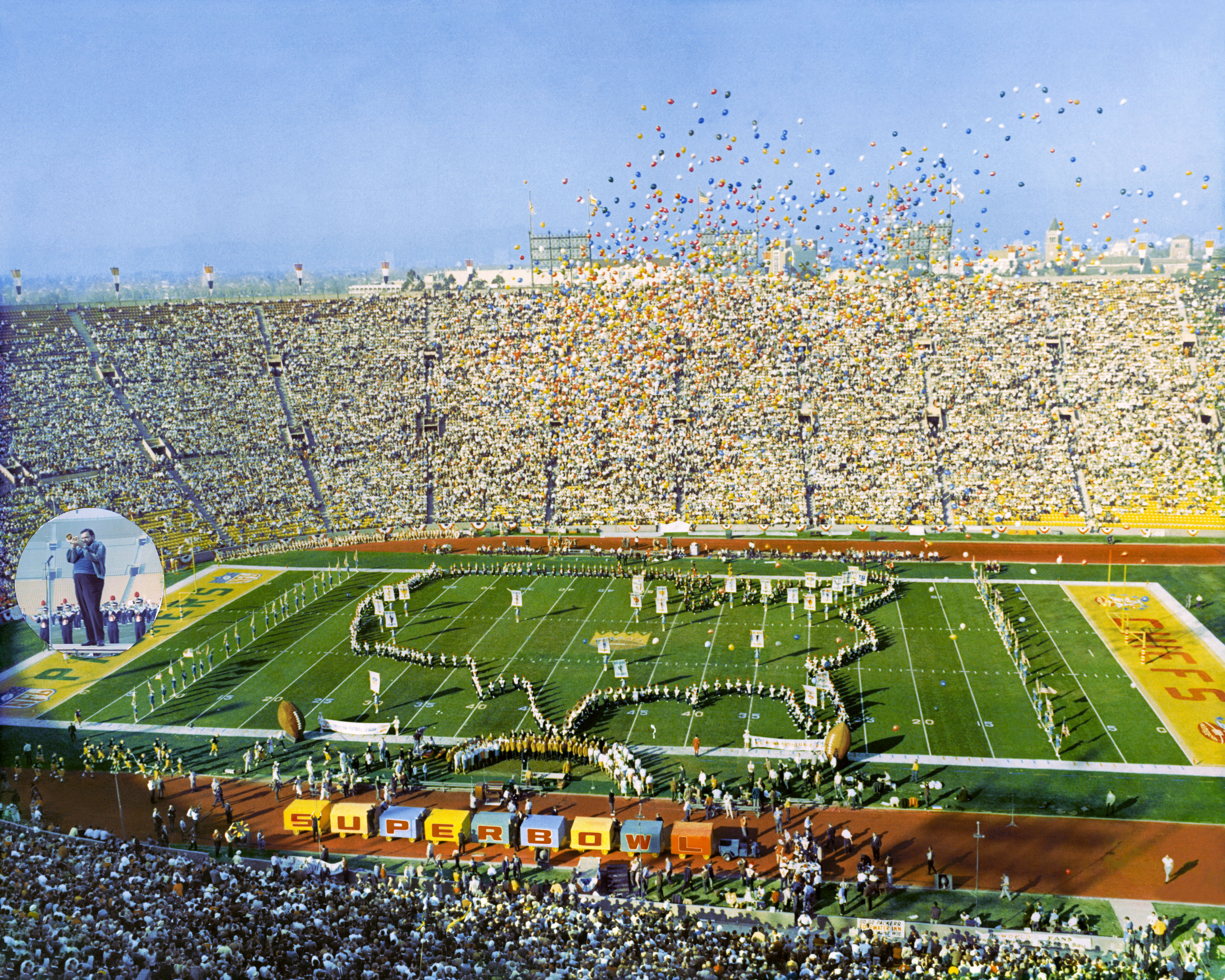
Super Bowl I, Los Angeles Coliseum

Los Angeles Memorial Coliseum is located in the Exposition Park neighborhood of Los Angeles, California. The stadium serves as the home to the University of Southern California(USC) Trojans football team. It was also the temporary home of the Los Angeles Rams before the completion of SoFi Stadium in Inglewood July 2020. The facility had a permanent seating capacity of 93,607 for USC football and Rams games, making it the largest football stadium in the Pac-12 Conference and the NFL. A 2018 renovation reduced capacity to 77,500. Conceived as a hallmark of civic pride, the Coliseum was commissioned in 1921 as a memorial to L.A. veterans of World War I. Completed in 1923, it will be the first stadium to have hosted the Summer Olympics three times: 1932, 1984, and 2028. It was declared a National Historic Landmark on July 27, 1984, the day before the opening ceremony of the 1984 Summer Olympics. The Coliseum is jointly owned by the State of California, Los Angeles County, City of Los Angeles and is managed and operated by the Auxiliary Services Department of the University of Southern California.

=== Rose Bowl Stadium ===
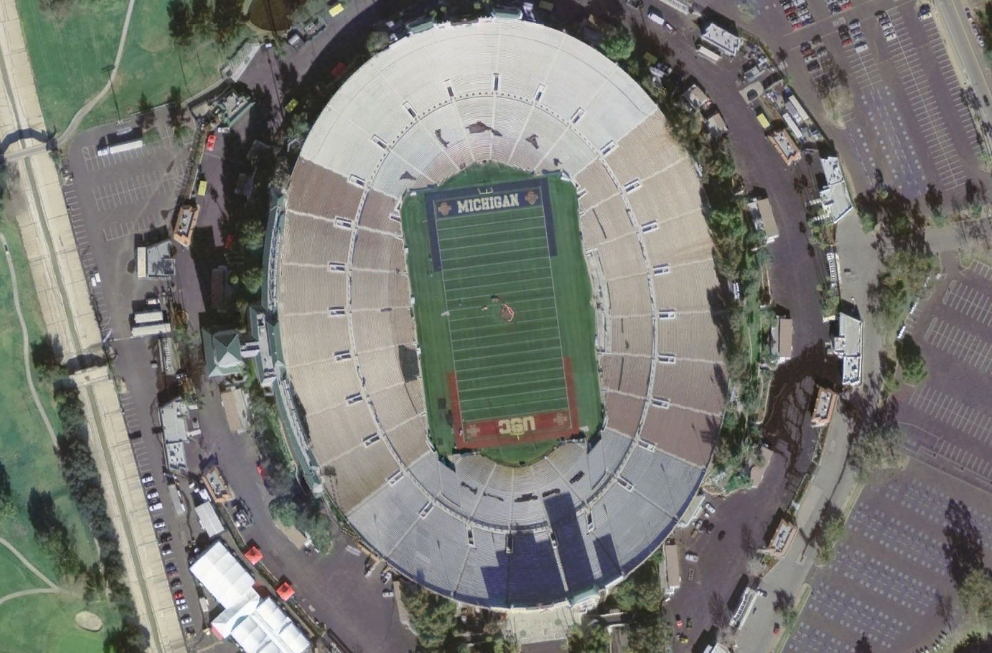
Rose Bowl Stadium satellite view

The Rose Bowl is a sport stadium, located in Pasadena, California, a northeast suburb of Los Angeles. Opened in October 1922, the stadium is recognized as a National Historic Landmark and a California Historic Civil Engineering landmark. At a modern capacity of an all-seated configuration at 92,542, the Rose Bowl is the 15th-largest stadium in the world, the 11th-largest stadium in the United States, and the 10th largest NCAA stadium. the Rose Bowl is one of the most famous venues in sporting history, Since 1982, it has also served as the home stadium of the UCLA Bruins football team. The stadium has also hosted five Super Bowl games, second most of any venue. The Rose Bowl is also a noted soccer venue, having hosted the 1994 FIFA World Cup Final, 1999 FIFA Women's World Cup Final, and the 1984 Olympic Gold Medal Match, as well as numerous CONCACAF and United States Soccer Federation matches.

=== Crypto.com Arena ===
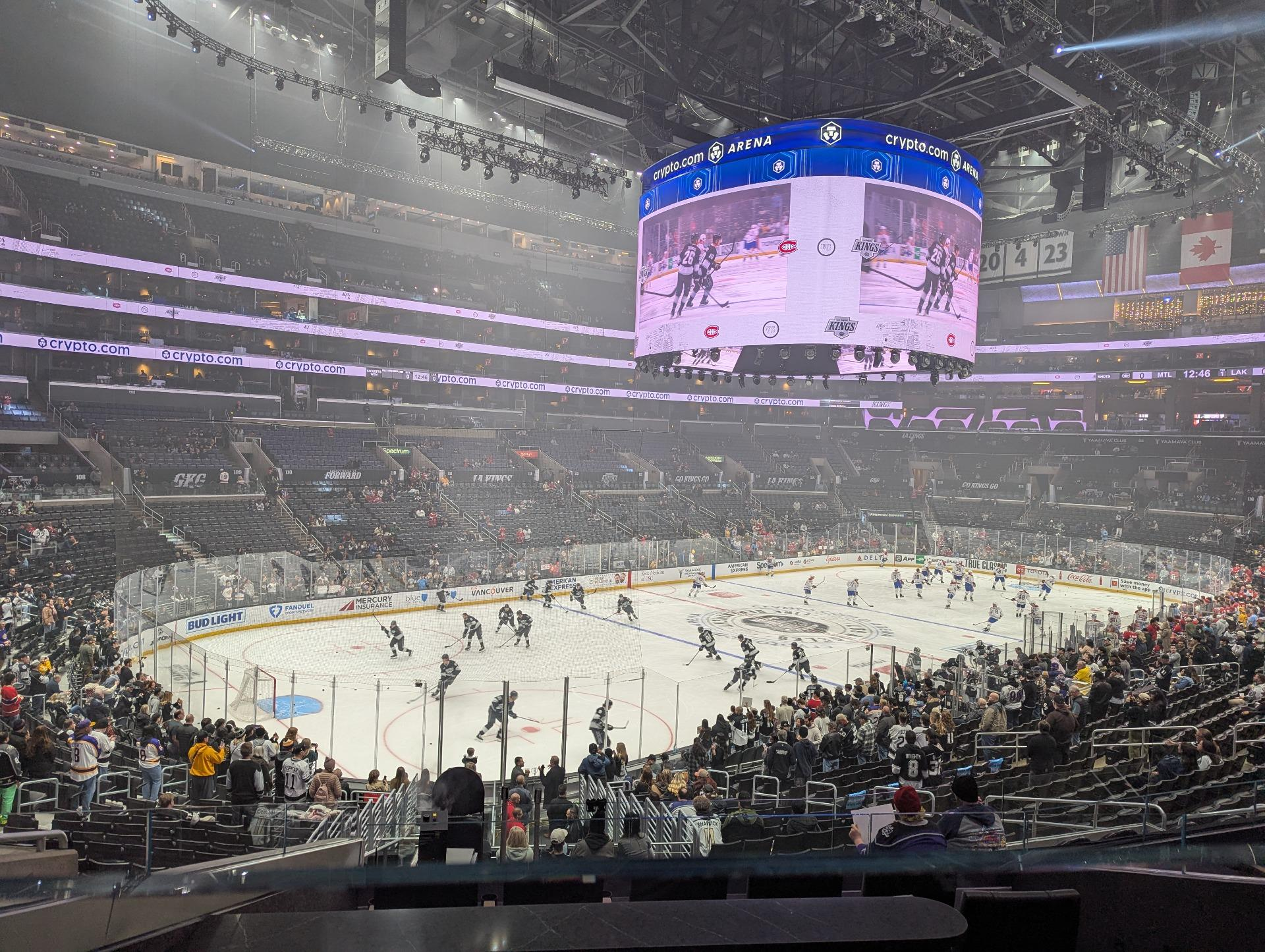
Crypto.com Arena serves as home to the Los Angeles Kings, Los Angeles Lakers, and Los Angeles Sparks.

Crypto.com Arena is a multi-purpose arena in Downtown Los Angeles located next to the Los Angeles Convention Center complex along Figueroa Street. The arena opened as Staples Center on October 17, 1999, adopting its current name on Christmas Day 2021. The arena is home venue to the Los Angeles Kings of the National Hockey League (NHL), the Los Angeles Lakers of the National Basketball Association (NBA), and the Los Angeles Sparks of the Women's National Basketball Association (WNBA). The Los Angeles Avengers of the Arena Football League (AFL) and the Los Angeles D-Fenders of the NBA D-League were also tenants; the Avengers were folded in 2009, and the D-Fenders (since renamed the South Bay Lakers) moved to the Lakers' practice facility at the Toyota Sports Center in El Segundo, California, for the 2011–12 season. Staples Center is also host to over 250 events and nearly 4 million guests each year. From 1999 to 2024, it was the only arena in the NBA shared by two teams, as well as one of only three North American professional sports venues to host two teams from the same league. The other two are MetLife Stadium, the home of the National Football League's New York Giants and New York Jets, and SoFi Stadium, to be discussed immediately below. Crypto.com Arena is the venue of the Grammy Awards ceremony and will host gymnastics competitions during the 2028 Summer Olympics.

=== SoFi Stadium ===
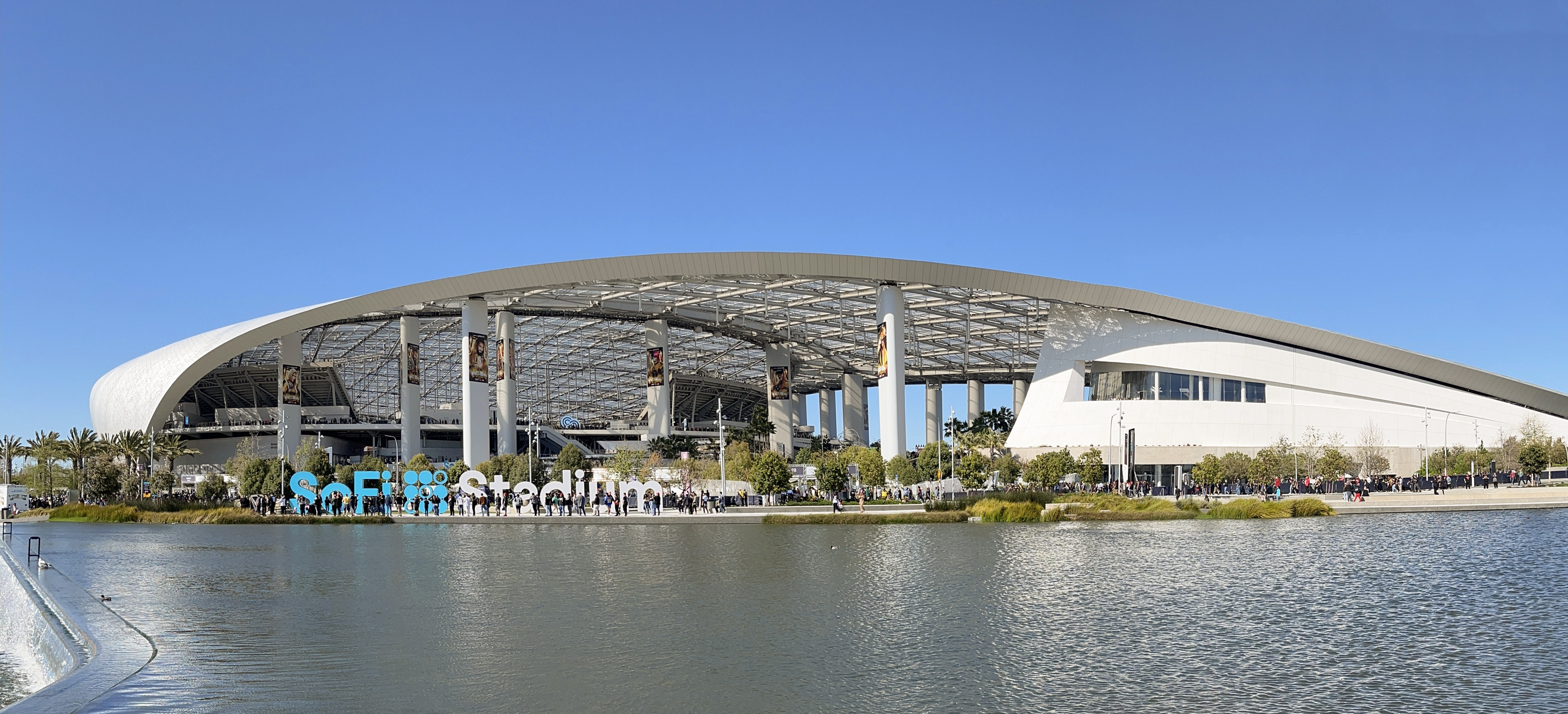
SoFi Stadium serves as home to the Los Angeles Rams, Los Angeles Chargers, and LA Bowl

SoFi Stadium, known as Los Angeles Stadium at Hollywood Park during its planning stages, is an ETFE roof–covered stadium and entertainment complex in the suburb of Inglewood. It is located at the former site of the Hollywood Park Racetrack, approximately three miles (5 km) from Los Angeles International Airport, immediately southeast of Kia Forum.

The stadium is home to the Los Angeles Rams and Los Angeles Chargers of the National Football League (NFL). It hosted Super Bowl LVI in February 2022, where the Rams became the second team to win in their home stadium after defeating the Cincinnati Bengals 23–20 and the College Football Playoff National Championship in January 2023, where Georgia won 65–7 against TCU, the largest margin of victory in a national championship game and the largest margin of victory in any bowl game at the Football Bowl Subdivision (FBS) level at the time, until Georgia surpassed that margin in the 2023 Orange Bowl. During the 2028 Summer Olympics, the stadium is expected to host the opening and closing ceremonies, as well as swimming. Archery will be held on the grounds outside the stadium.

SoFi Stadium is the third stadium, and second to be in current use, since the 1970 AFL–NFL merger to be shared by two NFL teams (MetLife Stadium, in East Rutherford, New Jersey, is home to the New York Giants and New York Jets, as was its predecessor, Giants Stadium). It is the fourth facility in the Los Angeles area to host multiple teams from the same league as Crypto.com Arena was home to both of the city's National Basketball Association (NBA) teams from 1999 to 2024, the Los Angeles Clippers and Los Angeles Lakers, Dignity Health Sports Park hosted both the LA Galaxy and now-defunct Chivas USA of Major League Soccer from 2005 to 2014, and Dodger Stadium hosted the Los Angeles Dodgers and Los Angeles Angels from 1962 to 1965.

The stadium is a component of Hollywood Park, a master planned neighborhood in development on the site of the former Hollywood Park Racetrack. Hollywood Park Casino opened in October 2016, becoming the first establishment to open on the property.

=== Intuit Dome ===
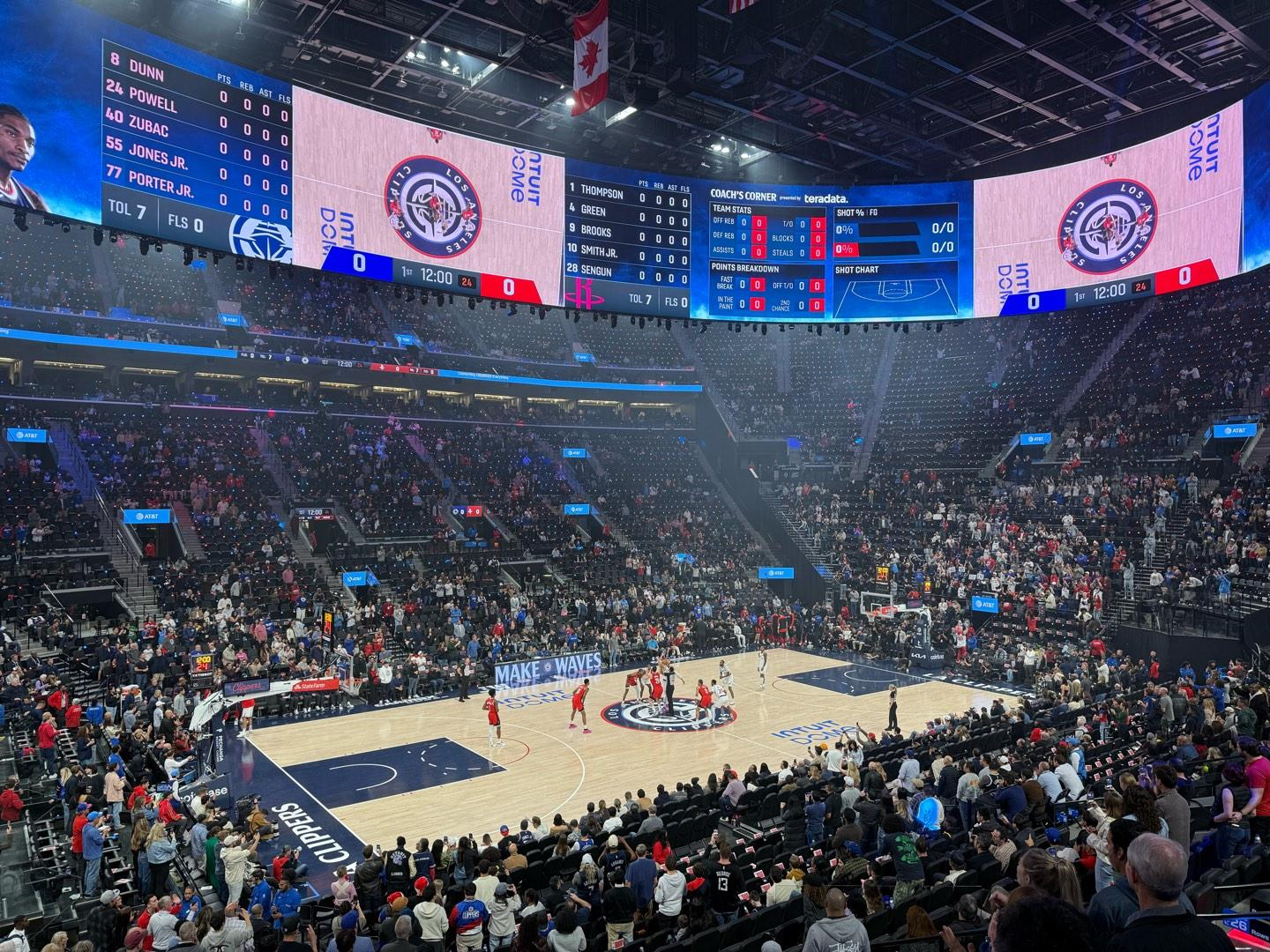
Intuit Dome serves as home to the Los Angeles Clippers.

Intuit Dome is an arena in Inglewood, California. Located south of SoFi Stadium, it is the new permanent home venue of the Los Angeles Clippers of the National Basketball Association (NBA), who moved from Crypto.com Arena.

A groundbreaking ceremony for the new arena was held on September 17, 2021. The arena opened in August 2024, ahead of the 2024–25 NBA season, and is set to host basketball at the 2028 Summer Olympics.

=== List of Los Angeles venues ===
Stadium	City	Capacity	Type	Tenants	Opened
Rose Bowl	Pasadena	92,542	Football	UCLA Bruins football; Rose Bowl Game	1922
Los Angeles Memorial Coliseum	Los Angeles	77,500	Football	USC Trojans football	1923
SoFi Stadium	Inglewood	70,240	Football	Los Angeles Chargers; Los Angeles Rams	2020
Dodger Stadium	Los Angeles	56,000	Baseball	Los Angeles Dodgers	1962
Angel Stadium	Anaheim	45,477	Baseball	Los Angeles Angels	1966
Dignity Health Sports Park	Carson	27,000	Soccer	LA Galaxy	2003
BMO Stadium	Los Angeles	22,000	Soccer	Los Angeles FC, Angel City FC	2018
Crypto.com Arena	Los Angeles	18,997	Arena	Los Angeles Lakers, Los Angeles Kings, Los Angeles Sparks	1999
Intuit Dome	Inglewood	18,000	Arena	Los Angeles Clippers	2024
Kia Forum	Inglewood	17,505	Arena		1967
Honda Center	Anaheim	17,174	Arena	Anaheim Ducks	1993
Indian Wells Tennis Garden Stadium 1	Indian Wells	16,100	Tennis		2000
Pauley Pavilion	Los Angeles	13,800	Arena	UCLA Bruins (basketball, volleyball)	1965
Toyota Arena	Ontario	11,832	Arena	Ontario Reign, Empire Strykers	2008
Long Beach Arena	Long Beach	11,719	Arena		1962
Acrisure Arena	Thousand Palms	11,000	Arena	Coachella Valley Firebirds, Coachella Valley Lakers	2022
Galen Center	Los Angeles	10,258	Arena	USC Trojans (basketball, volleyball)	2006
Dignity Health Tennis Stadium	Carson	9,000	Tennis		2003
Indian Wells Tennis Garden Stadium 2	Indian Wells	8,000	Tennis		2000
The Arena at the Anaheim Convention Center	Anaheim	7,500	Arena		1967
Shrine Auditorium	Los Angeles	6,300	Auditorium		1926
Pico Rivera Sports Arena	Pico Rivera	6,250	Arena		1979
Bren Events Center	Irvine	5,600	Arena	UC Irvine Anteaters (basketball, volleyball)	1984
CBU Events Center	Riverside	5,500	Arena	California Baptist Lancers (basketball, volleyball)	2017
Walter Pyramid	Long Beach	5,500	Arena	Long Beach State (basketball, volleyball)	1992
Coussoulis Arena	San Bernardino	5,000	Arena	Cal State San Bernardino Coyotes	1995
Industry Hills Expo Center	City of Industry	5,000	Arena		1981
Orange Pavilion	San Bernardino	5,000	Arena		
Titan Gym	Fullerton	5,000	Arena	Cal State Fullerton Titans (basketball, volleyball)	1964
Torodome	Carson	4,500	Arena	Cal State Dominguez Hills Toros	1970
Gersten Pavilion	Los Angeles	4,000	Arena	Loyola Marymount Lions (basketball, volleyball)	1981
Eagle's Nest Arena	Los Angeles	3,500	Arena	Cal State Los Angeles Golden Eagles	1981
Equidome	Los Angeles	3,500	Arena		1982
Firestone Fieldhouse	Malibu	3,200	Arena	Pepperdine Waves (basketball, volleyball)	1973
SRC Arena	Riverside	3,200	Arena	UC Riverside Highlanders	1994
FivePoint Arena	Irvine	3,000	Arena		2019
Matadome	Northridge	3,000	Arena	Cal State Northridge Matadors	1962
Knight Riders Cricket Ground	Pomona	15,000	Cricket	Los Angeles Knight Riders	2026

== Olympic and Paralympic Games ==
Los Angeles has hosted the Summer Olympic Games twice. The city first hosted the games in 1932 and hosted once again in 1984. Los Angeles has made a total of ten Summer Olympic bids in its history, more than any other city. Los Angeles along with Athens (1896, 2004), Paris (1900, 1924) and Tokyo (1964, 2020) are the four cities that have hosted the Summer Olympic Games twice. Los Angeles will host the 2028 Summer Olympics and Paralympic Games and will become the third city to host the Olympics three times, after London (1908, 1948, 2012) and Paris (1900, 1924, 2024).

=== 1932 Olympic Games ===
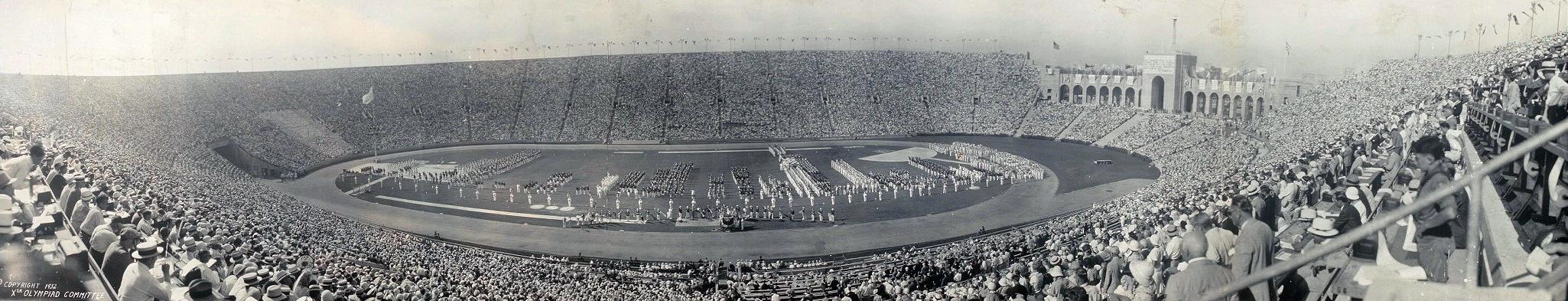
The Opening Ceremony of the 1932 Summer Olympics

The 1932 Summer Olympics marked the first time Los Angeles staged the Olympic Games. It took place during the Great Depression and the games were reported to have produced a $1 million profit for the city. Los Angeles was the only city to submit a bid for the 1932 edition of the Summer Olympics and was selected as the host city at the 21st IOC Session in Rome in 1923. That same year, Lake Placid hosted the 1932 Winter Olympics. The 1932 Summer Olympics marked the second time the US had hosted the Summer Olympics, with St. Louis hosting the 1904 Summer Olympics.

The United States won a total of 103 medals during the games, including 41 gold medals.

Since the games were the tenth edition of the modern Olympic Games, Tenth Street was renamed Olympic Boulevard. Today Olympic Blvd is home to multiple attractions, such as the Grammy Museum.

=== 1984 Olympic Games ===
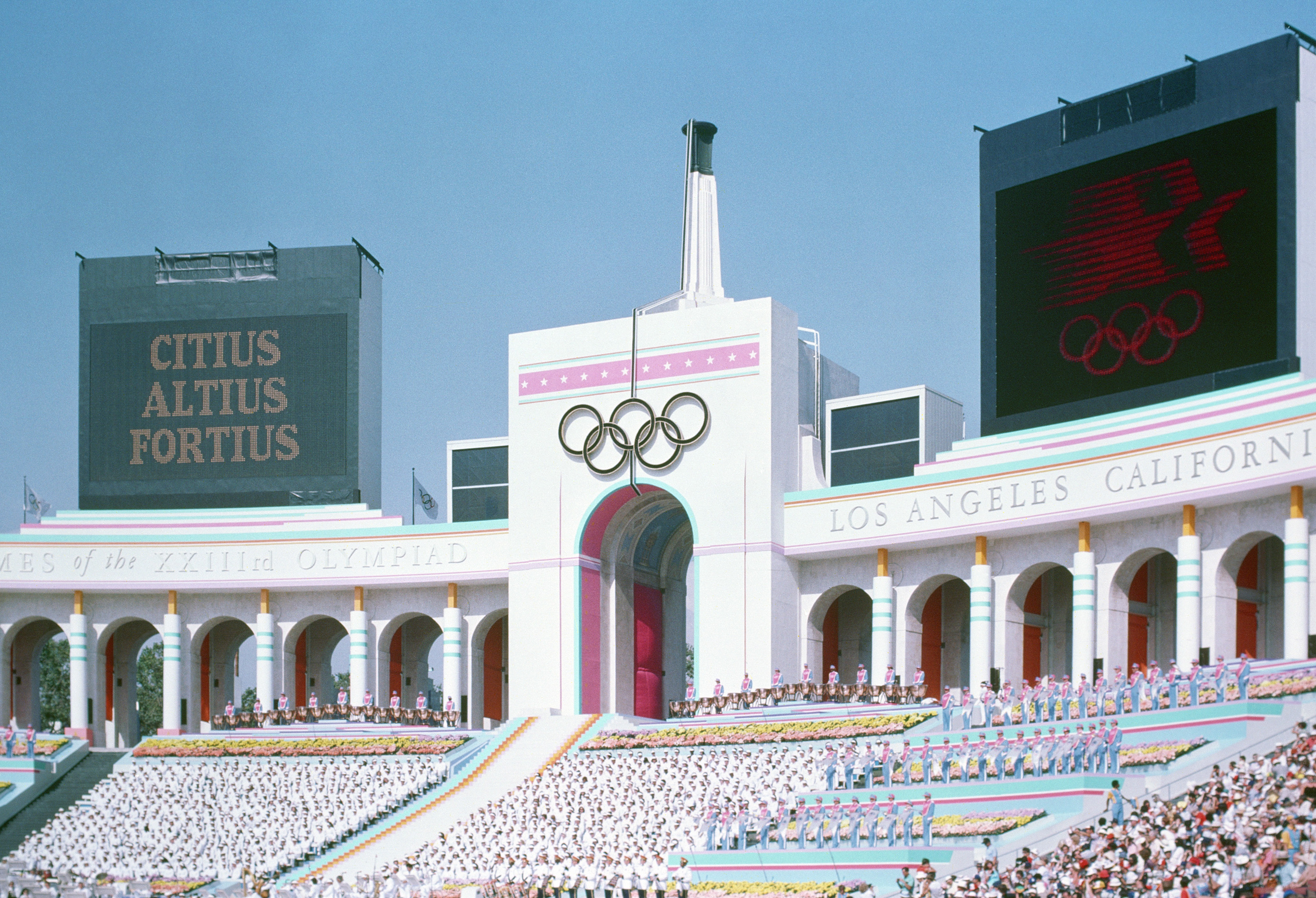
The Opening Ceremony of the 1984 Summer Olympics

The 1984 Summer Olympics marked the second time Los Angeles had staged the Olympic Games. Much like the 1932 Summer Olympics, Los Angeles was the only city to submit a bid. Los Angeles was elected as the host city at the 80th IOC Session in Athens in 1978. The cost overruns of the 1976 Summer Olympics in Montreal and 1980 Summer Olympics in Moscow discouraged cities to bid. However, Los Angeles depended on existing venues and infrastructure to host the games, in addition to being entirely privately funded, unlike Moscow and Montreal which were funded by their respective governments. The games produced a $200 million profit and are considered the most successful edition of the Olympic Games, as well as the model for the future editions.

The Games were boycotted by fourteen Eastern Bloc countries, including the Soviet Union. Romania and Yugoslavia however, did not take part in the boycott and competed at the 1984 Summer Olympics. The United States and many allied nations had boycotted the 1980 Summer Olympics in Moscow four years earlier, protesting Soviet activity in Afghanistan.

The United States won a total of 174 medals, including 83 gold medals.

=== 2028 Olympic Games ===
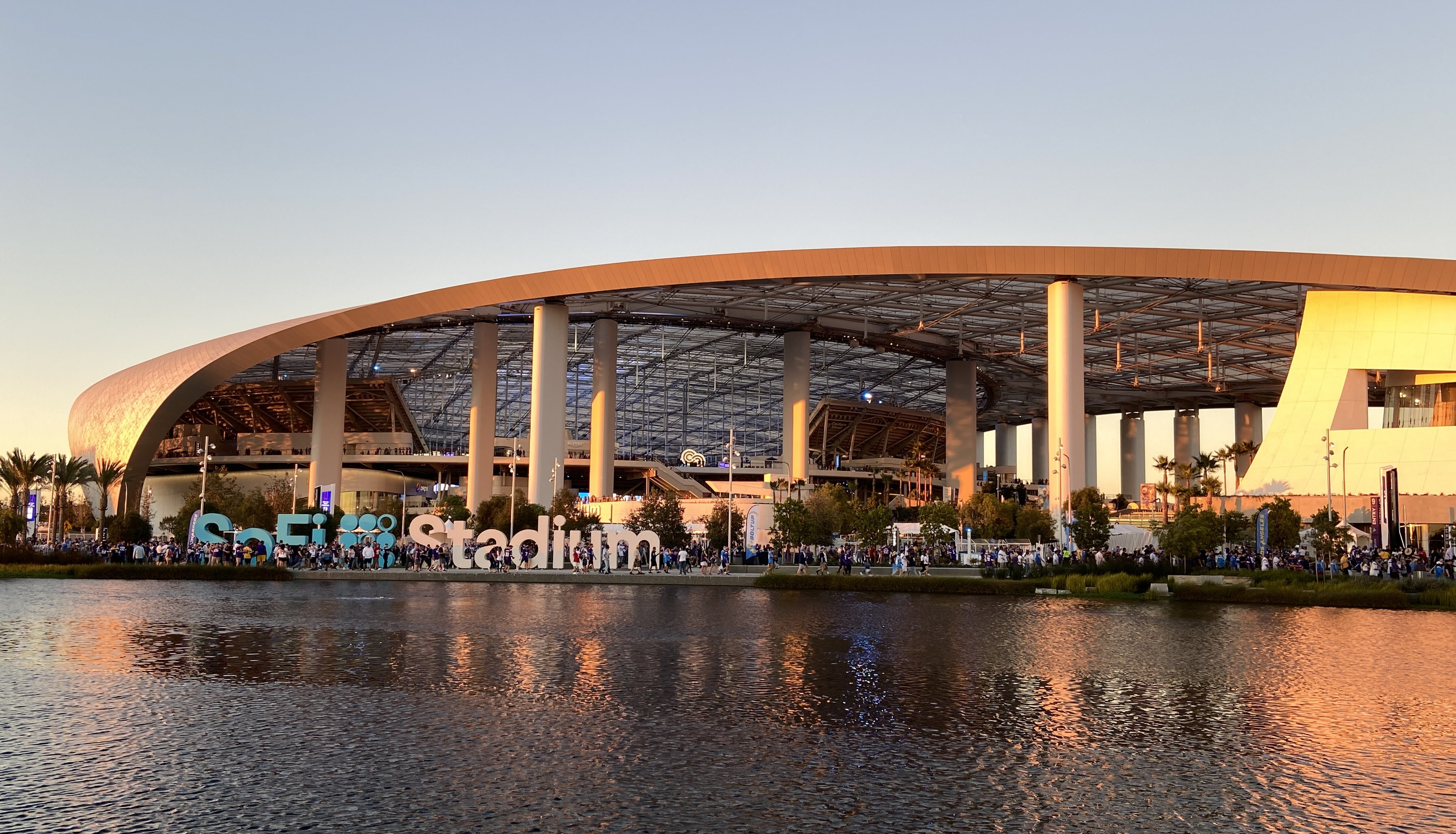
Exterior of SoFi Stadium, which will host the main opening ceremony for the 2028 Summer Olympics.

Los Angeles will host the 2028 Summer Olympics. This will mark the third time the Olympic Games are held in Los Angeles. The city will join London and Paris as the only cities to have hosted the Olympics three times.

Upon the USOC reaching a new revenue sharing agreement with the IOC, Los Angeles had been mentioned as a possible bidding city for the 2024 Summer Olympics. In March 2013, Mayor Antonio Villaraigosa sent a letter to the USOC confirming the city's interest in bidding for the 2024 Olympics. On September 1, 2015, Los Angeles was chosen as the U.S. candidate to bid for the 2024 Summer Olympics after the USOC withdrew Boston's bid for the 2024 Olympics. After Rome, Hamburg and Budapest withdrew their bids for the 2024 Olympics, only Los Angeles and Paris remained in the race. The IOC then decided to award both Paris and Los Angeles with future editions of the Olympic Games. In July 2017, an agreement was made which secured the 2024 Olympics for Paris and the 2028 Olympics for Los Angeles. Both cities were unanimously elected at the 131st IOC Session in Lima on September 13, 2017.

=== 2028 Paralympic Games ===
The 2028 Summer Paralympics will be held in Los Angeles. This will mark the first time the Paralympic Games are held in Los Angeles. During the summer when Los Angeles hosted the 1984 Summer Olympics, the 1984 Summer Paralympics were held in New York City and Stoke Mandeville. This was before the Olympics and Paralympics were held in the same host city.

=== Unsuccessful bids ===
Aside from securing the right to host the 1932, 1984 and 2028 Summer Olympics, Los Angeles has made frequent Olympic bids in the past. Out of the ten bids which the USOC had submitted to the IOC over the years, seven previous official bids were unsuccessful. Los Angeles submitted bids for the 1924, 1928, 1948, 1952, 1956, 1976 and 1980 Summer Olympics, but lost to Paris, Amsterdam, London, Helsinki, Melbourne, Montreal and Moscow respectively.

Los Angeles had expressed interest to the USOC about bidding for the Olympics on multiple occasions, while failing to secure the USOC's support. Seventeen years after hosting the 1984 Olympics, the city became interested in bidding for the 2012 Summer Olympics, but the USOC chose to submit New York City's bid to the IOC. New York ultimately lost to London. Los Angeles later bid to be the US candidate for the 2016 Summer Olympics, but the USOC decided to submit Chicago's bid to the IOC. Chicago ultimately lost to Rio de Janeiro. Following Chicago's defeat, Los Angeles again expressed interest in bidding for a future edition of the Olympic Games. In November 2011 a delegation from Los Angeles attended a seminar at the IOC headquarters for cities interested in bidding on future editions of the Olympic Games. The USOC declined to submit a bid for the 2020 Summer Olympics, which was ultimately awarded to Tokyo. In February 2012, Los Angeles hosted the 5th IOC World Conference on Women and Sport which was attended by then-IOC President Jacques Rogge as well as IOC members. At the conference Mayor Antonio Villaraigosa and IOC Member Anita DeFrantz stated that the city would be interested in hosting the Olympic Games a third time.

== FIFA Tournaments ==
The Greater Los Angeles Area has hosted three FIFA-designated soccer tournaments and is set to host matches during the 2026 FIFA World Cup. Following the 2026 FIFA World Cup, The Los Angeles area will have hosted the FIFA World Cup and the FIFA Women's World Cup two times each. The Los Angeles area also hosted the 2025 FIFA Club World Cup

=== 1994 FIFA World Cup ===
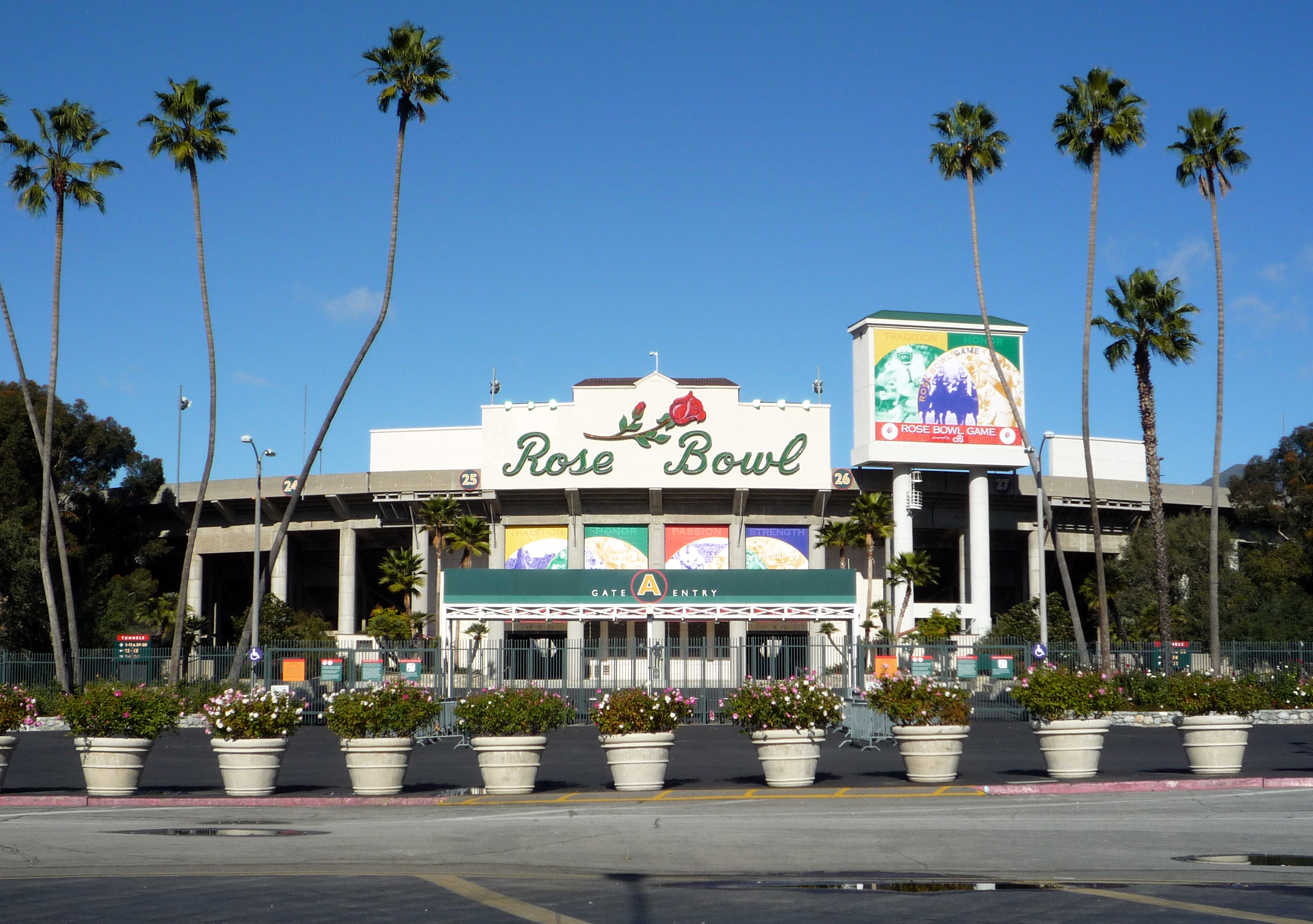
The Rose Bowl hosted the 1994 FIFA World Cup Final (c. 2008)

In 1994 the United States hosted the FIFA World Cup. The Rose Bowl in Pasadena hosted eight matches, including the final where Brazil defeated Italy 3–2 on penalties.

Date	Time (UTC−8)	Team #1	Score	Team #2	Round	Attendance
June 18, 1994	16:30	Colombia	1–3	Romania	Group A	91,856
June 19, 1994	16:30	Cameroon	2–2	Sweden	Group B	93,194
June 22, 1994	16:30	United States	2–1	Colombia	Group A	93,869
June 26, 1994	13:00	United States	0–1	Romania	Group A	93,869
July 3, 1994	13:30	Romania	3–2	Argentina	Round of 16	90,469
July 13, 1994	16:30	Sweden	0–1	Brazil	Semi-Final	91,856
July 16, 1994	12:30	Sweden	4–0	Bulgaria	Third place	91,500
July 17, 1994	12:30	Brazil	0–0 (3–2)	Italy	Final	94,194

=== 2026 FIFA World Cup ===
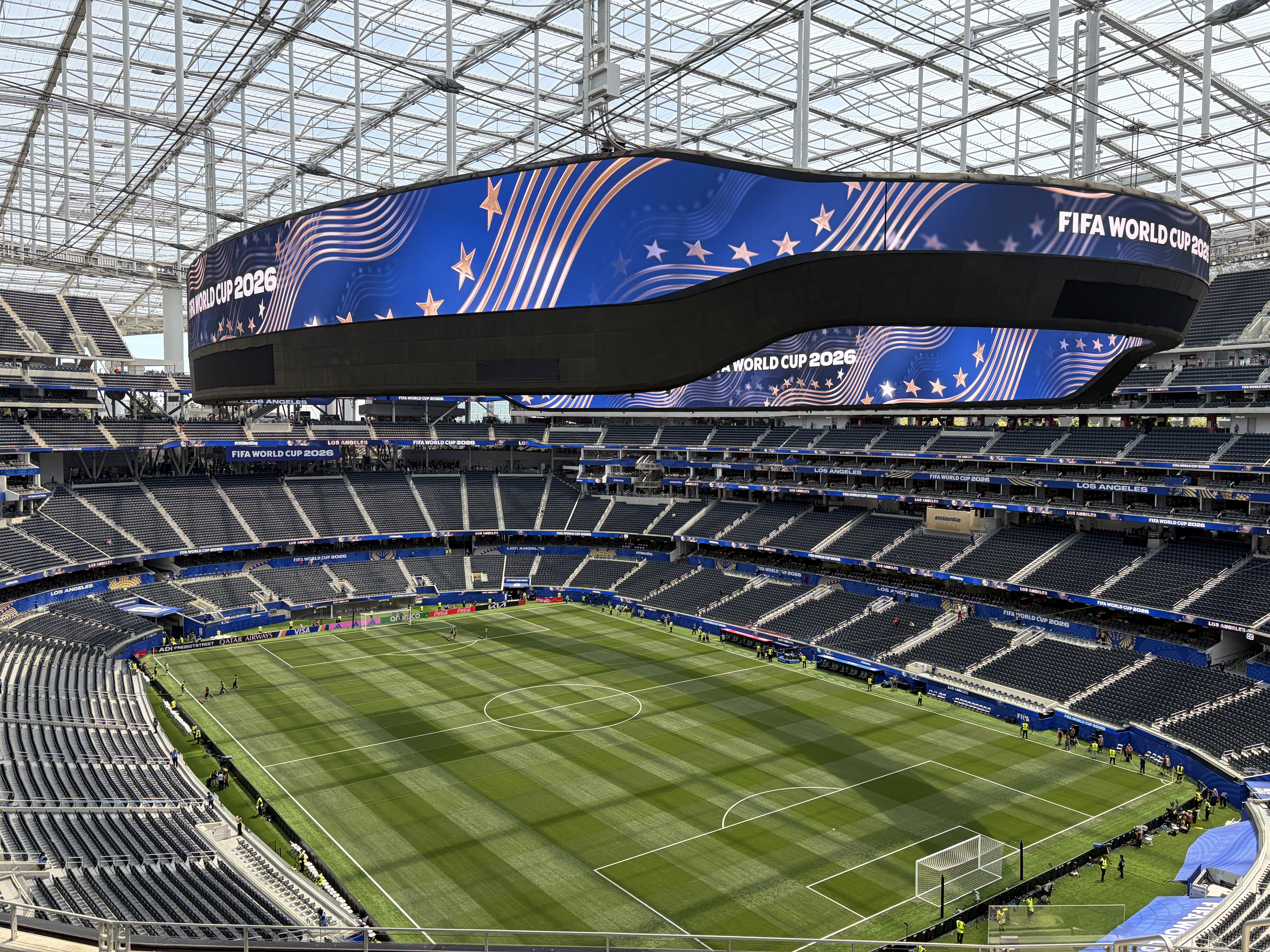
Inside SoFi Stadium, a few hours prior to the US opening match of the 2026 FIFA World Cup.

Los Angeles was among the 16 host cities for the 2026 FIFA World Cup that was held in three different countries, the United States, Canada and Mexico. SoFi Stadium is hosting eight matches including the US Opening match, two matches in the round of 32, and a quarterfinal. SoFi Stadium was one of two venues in California which hosted matches, the other being Levi's Stadium in the San Francisco Bay Area.

Date	Time (UTC−7)	Team #1	Res.	Team #2	Round	Attendance
June 12, 2026	18:00	United States	4–1	Paraguay	Group D	70,492
June 15, 2026	18:00	Iran	2–2	New Zealand	Group G	70,108
June 18, 2026	12:00	Switzerland	4–1	Bosnia and Herzegovina	Group B	70,026
June 21, 2026	12:00	Belgium	0–0	Iran	Group G	70,317
June 25, 2026	19:00	Turkey	3–2	United States	Group D	70,492
June 28, 2026	12:00	South Africa	0–1	Canada	Round of 32	69,237
July 2, 2026	12:00	Spain	3–0	Austria	Round of 32	70,492
July 10, 2026	12:00	Spain	2–1	Belgium	Quarterfinal	70,492

=== 1999 FIFA Women's World Cup ===
Los Angeles was one of the host cities for the 1999 FIFA Women's World Cup. The Rose Bowl hosted four matches during the 1999 FIFA Women's World Cup including the final where the United States defeated China 5–4 on penalties.

Date	Time (UTC−8)	Team #1	Res.	Team #2	Round	Attendance
June 20, 1999	16:00	Italy	1 – 1	Germany	Group B	17,100
June 20, 1999	18:30	North Korea	1 – 2	Nigeria	Group A	17,100
July 10, 1999	10:15	Norway	0 – 0 (4 – 5)	Brazil	3rd place match	90,185
July 10, 1999	12:30	United States	0 – 0 (5 – 4)	China	Final	90,185

=== 2003 FIFA Women's World Cup ===
The United States hosted the FIFA Women's World Cup again in 2003 after China withdrew as hosts due to the SARS outbreak. The Home Depot Center, now known as Dignity Health Sports Park, in Carson was one of the venues that was used in the event. The venue hosted six games, including the final where Germany defeated Sweden 2–1 in sudden death.

Date	Match	Winning team	Result	Losing team	Attendance
September 21, 2003	Group D	Russia	2–1	Australia	8,500
September 21, 2003	Group D	China	1–0	Ghana	10,027
September 25, 2003	Group D	Russia	3–0	Ghana	13,929
September 25, 2003	Group D	China	1–1	Australia	13,929
October 11, 2003	Third-place match	United States	3–1	Canada	25,253
October 12, 2003	Final	Germany	1–0 (a.e.t.)	Sweden	26,137

=== 2025 FIFA Club World Cup ===
Los Angeles was one of the host cities for the 2025 FIFA Club World Cup. The Rose Bowl hosted six matches during the 2025 FIFA Club World Cup.

Date	Time (UTC−8)	Team #1	Res.	Team #2	Round	Attendance
June 15, 2025	12:00	Paris Saint-Germain (France)	4–0	(Spain) Atlético Madrid	Group B	80,619
June 17, 2025	18:00	Monterrey (Mexico)	1–1	(Italy) Inter Milan	Group E	40,311
June 19, 2025	18:00	Paris Saint-Germain (France)	0–1	(Brazil) Botafogo	Group B	53,699
June 21, 2025	18:00	River Plate (Argentina)	0–0	(Mexico) Monterrey	Group E	57,393
June 23, 2025	12:00	Atlético Madrid (Spain)	1–0	(Brazil) Botafogo	Group B	22,992
June 25, 2025	18:00	Urawa Red Diamonds (Japan)	0–4	(Mexico) Monterrey	Group E	14,312

== International tournaments ==
Los Angeles has been a hub for international sports for decades. Throughout the history of the Greater Los Angeles area, international sporting events aside from the Olympic Games and FIFA World Cup tournaments have also taken place across the region.

=== Other soccer tournaments ===
Apart from hosting FIFA World Cup tournaments, The Los Angeles area has hosted several other soccer tournaments as well. The Rose Bowl hosted three matches during the 2016 Copa América and has hosted matches during the CONCACAF Gold Cup on multiple occasions. Dignity Health Sports Park in Carson as well as the Los Angeles Memorial Coliseum have also hosted matches during the CONCACAF Gold Cup over the years. The 2023 CONCACAF Gold Cup Final was held at SoFi Stadium on July 16, 2023. Two matches during the 2024 Copa América were also held at SoFi Stadium.

=== Boxing ===
Boxing matches have been held throughout the Greater Los Angeles Area. Venues that have held boxing matches include Ocean Park Arena, Hazard's Pavilion, Hollywood Legion Stadium, Naud Junction, Vernon Arena, Grand Olympic Auditorium, Los Angeles Memorial Coliseum, Wrigley Field, Dodger Stadium, Valley Garden Arena, Los Angeles Memorial Sports Arena, Kia Forum, Honda Center, Peacock Theater, Crypto.com Arena and Dignity Health Sports Park.

=== Los Angeles Marathon ===
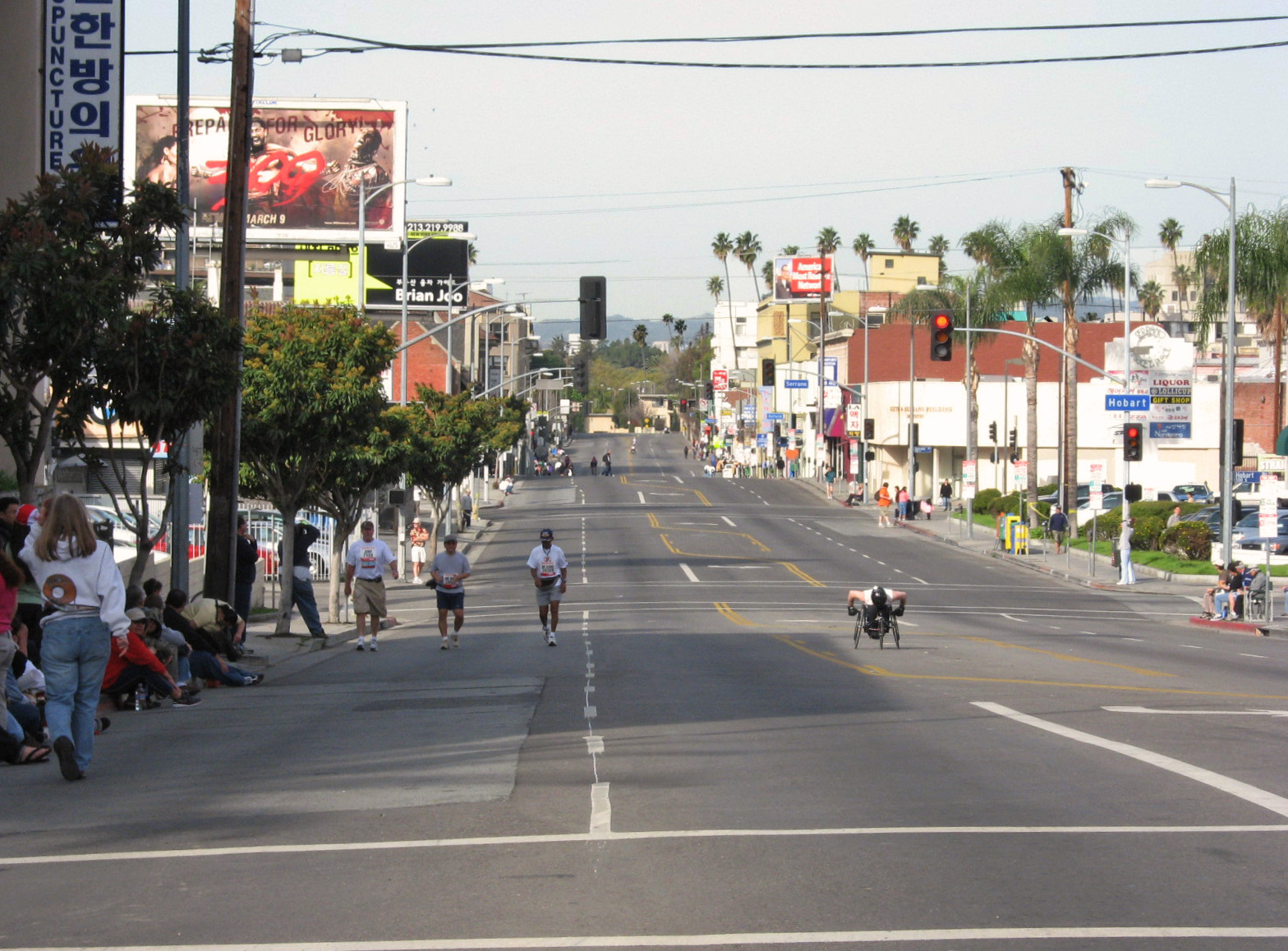
LA Marathon walkers

The Los Angeles Marathon is a running event held in the spring of each calendar year. it is a foot race run over a 26.2 mi (42.2 km) course takes the runners from Dodger Stadium across the City of Los Angeles to a scenic finish just steps from the Santa Monica Pier. Ever since it was first launched after the summer Olympics 1984, it has been an attracted place for professional as well as amateurs athletics from all over the world with a capacity of 24000 making it the fifth-largest-running event in the United States.

=== ISA World Surfing Games & US Open of Surfing ===
Often referred to as "Surf City, USA", Huntington Beach is a popular destination for Surfing and surf competitions.

The ISA World Surfing Games have been held in Huntington Beach on four occasions. The 2022 ISA World Surfing Games were the most recent edition of the games to be held in Huntington Beach. They were held from September 16 to September 24, 2022. The ISA World Surfing Games were previously held in Huntington Beach in 2006, 1996 and in 1984.

Huntington Beach also hosts the annual US Open of Surfing.

=== 1972 & 2015 Special Olympics ===
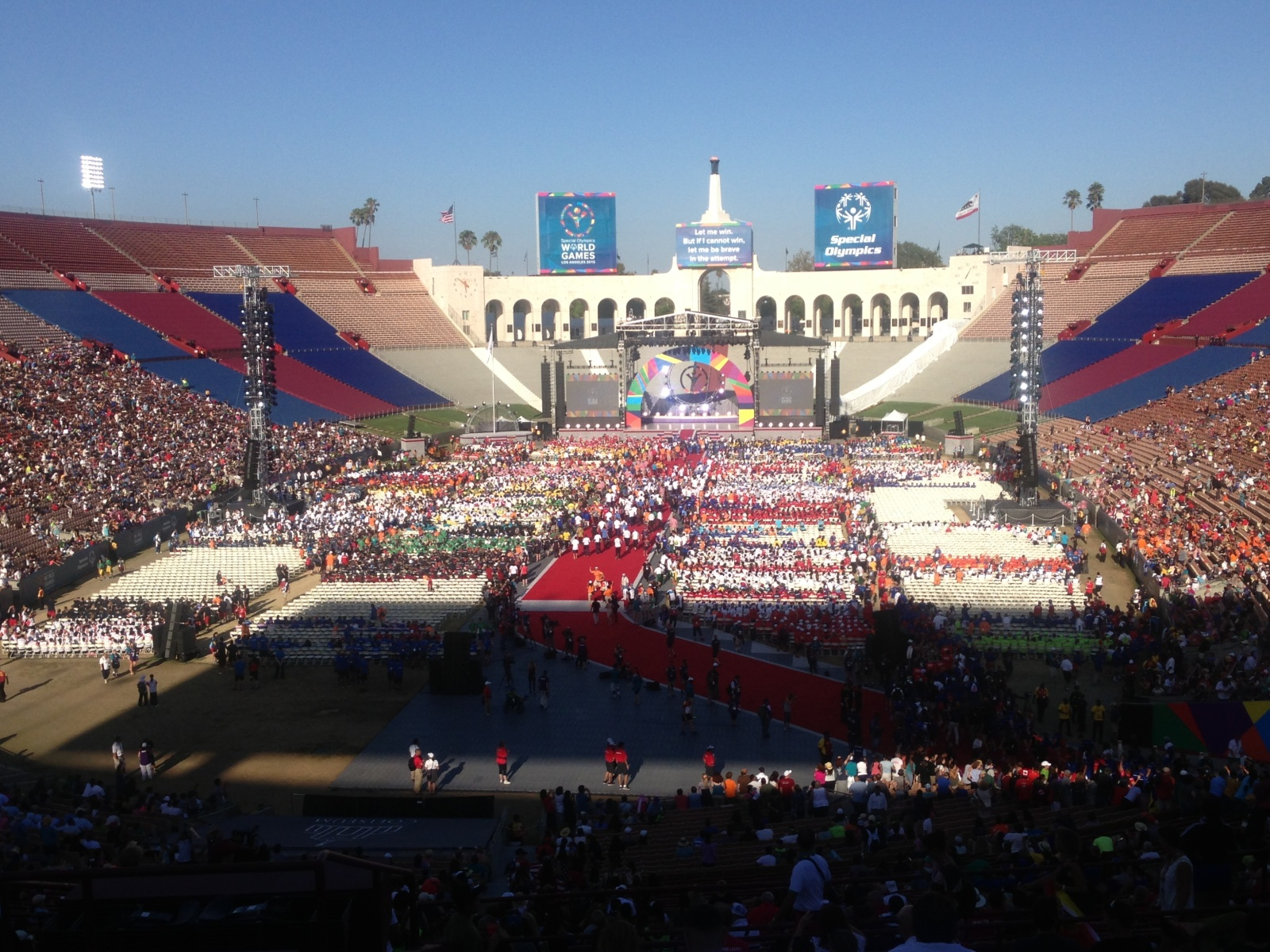
Athletes entering the Los Angeles Memorial Coliseum during the closing ceremony of the 2015 Special Olympics on August 2, 2015.

Los Angeles has served as host of the Special Olympics on two occasions.

Los Angeles first hosted the Special Olympics World Summer Games in 1972. Los Angeles hosted the Special Olympics for a second time in 2015, which were held between July 24 to August 2, 2015.

=== 2003 World Artistic Gymnastics Championships ===
The 2003 World Artistic Gymnastics Championships were held at the Honda Center in Anaheim. It was the 37th edition of the World Artistic Gymnastics Championships.

=== 2009 World Figure Skating Championships ===
The 2009 World Figure Skating Championships were held at the Crypto.com Arena in Los Angeles in March 2009.

=== 2010 and 2026 Pan Pacific Swimming Championships ===
The William Woollett Jr. Aquatics Center in Irvine hosted the 2010 Pan Pacific Swimming Championships, which was the eleventh edition of the Pan Pacific Swimming Championships. The same venue will also host the 2026 Pan Pacific Swimming Championships.

=== 2013 & 2016 League of Legends World Championships ===
Los Angeles has played host to the 2013 and 2016 League of Legends World Championship Finals.

=== 2016 ICC World Cricket League Division Four ===
The 2016 ICC World Cricket League Division Four tournament was held at the Leo Magnus Cricket Complex in Woodley Park, Van Nuys, Los Angeles between October 28 and November 5, 2016, involving national teams from Bermuda, Denmark, Italy, Jersey, Oman, and the United States.

=== U.S. Open 2023 ===
After 75 years of being held in other US locations, the U.S. Open returned to Los Angeles in 2023 at Los Angeles Country Club.

=== 2031 and 2033 Rugby World Cups ===
Los Angeles is amongst the cities being considered for hosting matches during the 2031 Men's Rugby World Cup and 2033 Women's Rugby World Cup.

== National tournaments ==
The Los Angeles area has hosted many national tournaments throughout history, including eight Super Bowls and six MLB All Star Games.

=== Super Bowls ===
The Super Bowl is the annual championship game of the National Football League (NFL) typically played annually between the champion of the National Football Conference (NFC) and the American Football Conference (AFC). The Los Angeles area has hosted the Super Bowl eight times in three different venues; the Los Angeles Memorial Coliseum, the Rose Bowl and SoFi Stadium. The city ranks third on the list of having hosted the most number of Super Bowls, after Miami and New Orleans.

Los Angeles hosted the Super Bowl for an eighth time with Super Bowl LVI in 2022 at SoFi Stadium where the Los Angeles Rams defeated the Cincinnati Bengals 23–20. It was the first Rams Super Bowl win while based in Los Angeles and the second-ever instance of a team winning the Super Bowl in its home stadium, the first being Super Bowl LV where the Tampa Bay Buccaneers won the championship in Raymond James Stadium in 2021.

Los Angeles was selected to host Super Bowl LXI in 2027.

Season	Date	Event	Opponents	Venue
1966	January 15, 1967	Super Bowl I	Kansas City Chiefs vs Green Bay Packers	Los Angeles Memorial Coliseum
1972	January 14, 1973	Super Bowl VII	Miami Dolphins vs Washington Redskins	Los Angeles Memorial Coliseum
1976	January 9, 1977	Super Bowl XI	Oakland Raiders vs Minnesota Vikings	Rose Bowl
1979	January 20, 1980	Super Bowl XIV	Los Angeles Rams vs Pittsburgh Steelers	Rose Bowl
1982	January 30, 1983	Super Bowl XVII	Miami Dolphins vs Washington Redskins	Rose Bowl
1986	January 25, 1987	Super Bowl XXI	Denver Broncos vs New York Giants	Rose Bowl
1992	January 31, 1993	Super Bowl XXVII	Buffalo Bills vs Dallas Cowboys	Rose Bowl
2021	February 13, 2022	Super Bowl LVI	Los Angeles Rams vs Cincinnati Bengals	SoFi Stadium
2026	February 14, 2027	Super Bowl LXI	TBD	SoFi Stadium

=== MLB All-Star Games ===
The Major League Baseball All-Star Game, also known as the "Midsummer Classic", is an annual professional baseball game sanctioned by Major League Baseball (MLB) contested between the All-Stars from the American League (AL) and National League (NL). The Los Angeles metropolitan area has hosted the MLB All-Star Game six times.

Date	City	Stadium	Host team	Host league
August 3, 1959	Los Angeles	Los Angeles Memorial Coliseum	Los Angeles Dodgers	NL
July 11, 1967	Anaheim	Anaheim Stadium	Los Angeles Angels	AL
July 8, 1980	Los Angeles	Dodger Stadium	Los Angeles Dodgers	NL
July 11, 1989	Anaheim	Anaheim Stadium	Los Angeles Angels	AL
July 13, 2010	Anaheim	Angel Stadium of Anaheim	Los Angeles Angels	AL
July 19, 2022	Los Angeles	Dodger Stadium	Los Angeles Dodgers	NL

=== NBA All-Star Games ===
The Los Angeles area has hosted the NBA All-Star Game on six occasions in three different venues. The 1963 NBA All-Star Game was held at the Los Angeles Memorial Sports Arena which was the first NBA All-Star Game to be held in the Los Angeles area. The 1972 and 1983 NBA All-Star Game were both held at Kia Forum in Inglewood. The Crypto.com Arena at LA Live hosted the 2004, 2011 and the 2018 NBA All-Star Game. The Intuit Dome hosted the 2026 NBA All-Star Game.

=== MLS All-Star Games ===
The Los Angeles area hosted the MLS All-Star Game twice. The 2003 MLS All Star Game was held at Dignity Health Sports Park in Carson and the 2021 MLS All Star Game was held at BMO Stadium.

=== NHL All-Star Games ===
The Los Angeles area has hosted the NHL All-Star Game on three occasions. The Kia Forum in Inglewood hosted the 33rd National Hockey League All-Star Game in 1981. The Crypto.com Arena hosted the NHL All-Star Game twice; hosting the game in 2002 and in 2017.

== Collegiate tournaments ==
Home to the University of Southern California and the University of California, Los Angeles as well as other notable universities, the Los Angeles area is a hub for collegiate sports. In turn, the Los Angeles area hosts a handful of notable collegiate tournaments.

=== Rose Bowl Game ===
Aside from hosting various incarnations of the championship game, the Los Angeles area hosts the annual Tournament of Roses college football game, commonly known as the Rose Bowl Game annually on New Year's Day. The games takes place at the Rose Bowl Stadium in Pasadena. The game is preceded by the Rose Parade which takes place on Colorado Boulevard.

=== LA Bowl ===
The LA Bowl is an NCAA Division I Football Bowl Subdivision game which is played annually at SoFi Stadium in Inglewood.

=== 2023 College Football Playoff National Championship ===
Los Angeles hosted the 9th edition of the College Football Playoff National Championship at SoFi Stadium in Inglewood on January 9, 2023.

== See also ==
- Soccer in Los Angeles
- List of Los Angeles County Cities
- Summer Olympics held in Greater Los Angeles
  - 1932 Summer Olympics
  - 1984 Summer Olympics
  - 2028 Summer Olympics
- 2028 Summer Paralympics
- Sports in San Diego
- Sports in the San Francisco Bay Area
- Sports in California
