= List of professional sports teams in the United States and Canada =

This article features a listing of men's and women's professional sports teams based in the United States and Canada, in addition to teams from other countries that compete in professional leagues based in the two countries.

== Table indicating the distribution of athletic teams by Sport and Metro ==
The following table indicates a summary table of the number of major league teams from each sport and their respective metro areas. In the event of cases where the metro area is identical but the locations are different, the metro area is all encompassing (ex: Bay Area being San Francisco, San Jose, and Oakland).

Metro/Sport		Football	Basketball	Baseball	Hockey	Soccer
Total North America	154	32	30	30	32	30
Revenue ($B, annum 2023)	49	20	10	11	6	2
Revenue ($B, annum 2025)	54	22	11	11	7	3
New York City, NY	11	2	2	2	3	2
Los Angeles, CA	9	1	2	2	2	2
SF Bay Area, CA	7	1	1	3	1	1
Chicago, IL	6	1	1	2	1	1
Boston, MA	5	1	1	1	1	1
Dallas, TX	5	1	1	1	1	1
Denver, CO	5	1	1	1	1	1
Miami, FL	5	1	1	1	1	1
Philadelphia, PA	5	1	1	1	1	1
Washington, DC	5	1	1	1	1	1
Atlanta, GA	4	1	1	1	0	1
Houston, TX	4	1	1	1	0	1
Minneapolis, MN	5	1	1	1	1	1
Detroit, MI	4	1	1	1	1	0
Phoenix, AZ	4	1	1	1	1	0
Toronto, ON	4	0	1	1	1	1
Seattle, WA	4	1	0	1	1	1
Charlotte, NC	3	1	1	0	0	1
Cincinnati, OH	3	1	0	1	0	1
Cleveland, OH	3	1	1	1	0	0
San Diego, CA	3	1	0	1	0	1
Nashville, TN	3	1	0	0	1	1
Pittsburgh, PA	3	1	0	1	1	0
Tampa, FL	3	1	0	1	1	0
St. Louis, MO	3	0	0	1	1	1
Baltimore, MD	2	1	0	1	0	0
Indianapolis, IN	2	1	1	0	0	0
Kansas City, (MO/KS)	2	1	0	0	0	1
New Orleans, LA	2	1	1	0	0	0
Milwaukee, WI	2	0	1	1	0	0
Orlando, FL	2	0	1	0	0	1
Portland, OR	2	0	1	0	0	1
Salt Lake City, UT	2	0	1	0	0	1
Buffalo, NY	2	1	0	0	1	0
Las Vegas, NV	2	1	0	0	1	0
Columbus, OH	2	0	0	0	1	1
Montreal, QC	2	0	0	0	1	1
Vancouver, BC	2	0	0	0	1	1
Green Bay, WI	1	1	0	0	0	0
Jacksonville, FL	1	1	0	0	0	0
Austin, TX	1	0	0	0	0	1
Memphis, TN	1	0	1	0	0	0
Oklahoma City, OK	1	0	1	0	0	0
Sacramento, CA	1	0	1	0	0	0
San Antonio, TX	1	0	1	0	0	0
Edmonton, AB	1	0	0	0	1	0
Ottawa, ON	1	0	0	0	1	0
Raleigh, NC	1	0	0	0	1	0
Winnipeg, MB	1	0	0	0	1	0
Calgary, AB	1	0	0	0	1	0

== Baseball ==
=== Major League Baseball ===
League	Division	Team	Location	Venue
American	East	Baltimore Orioles	Baltimore, Maryland	Oriole Park at Camden Yards
American	East	Boston Red Sox	Boston, Massachusetts	Fenway Park
American	East	New York Yankees	Bronx, New York	Yankee Stadium
American	East	Tampa Bay Rays	St. Petersburg, Florida	Tropicana Field
American	East	Toronto Blue Jays	Toronto, Ontario	Rogers Centre
American	Central	Chicago White Sox	South Side Chicago, Illinois	Rate Field
American	Central	Cleveland Guardians	Cleveland, Ohio	Progressive Field
American	Central	Detroit Tigers	Detroit, Michigan	Comerica Park (Note: Comerica Park to be renamed to Fifth Third Park in 2027.)
American	Central	Kansas City Royals	Kansas City, Missouri	Kauffman Stadium
American	Central	Minnesota Twins	Minneapolis, Minnesota	Target Field
American	West	Athletics	West Sacramento, California	Sutter Health Park
American	West	Houston Astros	Houston, Texas	Daikin Park
American	West	Los Angeles Angels	Anaheim, California	Angel Stadium
American	West	Seattle Mariners	Seattle, Washington	T-Mobile Park
American	West	Texas Rangers	Arlington, Texas	Globe Life Field
National	East	Atlanta Braves	Cumberland, Georgia	Truist Park
National	East	Miami Marlins	Miami, Florida	LoanDepot Park
National	East	New York Mets	Queens, New York	Citi Field
National	East	Philadelphia Phillies	Philadelphia, Pennsylvania	Citizens Bank Park
National	East	Washington Nationals	Washington, D.C.	Nationals Park
National	Central	Chicago Cubs	North Side Chicago, Illinois	Wrigley Field
National	Central	Cincinnati Reds	Cincinnati, Ohio	Great American Ball Park
National	Central	Milwaukee Brewers	Milwaukee, Wisconsin	American Family Field
National	Central	Pittsburgh Pirates	Pittsburgh, Pennsylvania	PNC Park
National	Central	St. Louis Cardinals	St. Louis, Missouri	Busch Stadium
National	West	Arizona Diamondbacks	Phoenix, Arizona	Chase Field
National	West	Colorado Rockies	Denver, Colorado	Coors Field
National	West	Los Angeles Dodgers	Los Angeles, California	Dodger Stadium
National	West	San Diego Padres	San Diego, California	Petco Park
National	West	San Francisco Giants	San Francisco, California	Oracle Park

=== Minor League Baseball ===
==== International League ====
Division	Team	Location	Venue
East	Buffalo Bisons	Buffalo, New York	Sahlen Field
East	Charlotte Knights	Charlotte, North Carolina	Truist Field
East	Durham Bulls	Durham, North Carolina	Durham Bulls Athletic Park
East	Jacksonville Jumbo Shrimp	Jacksonville, Florida	VyStar Ballpark
East	Lehigh Valley IronPigs	Allentown, Pennsylvania	Coca-Cola Park
East	Norfolk Tides	Norfolk, Virginia	Harbor Park
East	Rochester Red Wings	Rochester, New York	ESL Ballpark
East	Scranton/Wilkes-Barre Highlanders	Moosic, Pennsylvania	PNC Field
East	Syracuse Mets	Syracuse, New York	NBT Bank Stadium
East	Worcester Red Sox	Worcester, Massachusetts	Polar Park
West	Columbus Clippers	Columbus, Ohio	Huntington Park
West	Gwinnett Stripers	Lawrenceville, Georgia	Gwinnett Field
West	Indianapolis Indians	Indianapolis, Indiana	Victory Field
West	Iowa Cubs	Des Moines, Iowa	Principal Park
West	Louisville Bats	Louisville, Kentucky	Louisville Slugger Field
West	Memphis Redbirds	Memphis, Tennessee	AutoZone Park
West	Nashville Sounds	Nashville, Tennessee	First Horizon Park
West	Omaha Storm Chasers	Papillion, Nebraska	Werner Park
West	St. Paul Saints	Saint Paul, Minnesota	CHS Field
West	Toledo Mud Hens	Toledo, Ohio	Fifth Third Field

==== Pacific Coast League ====
Division	Team	Location	Venue
East	Albuquerque Isotopes	Albuquerque, New Mexico	Rio Grande Credit Union Field at Isotopes Park
East	El Paso Chihuahuas	El Paso, Texas	Southwest University Park
East	Oklahoma City Comets	Oklahoma City, Oklahoma	Chickasaw Bricktown Ballpark
East	Round Rock Express	Round Rock, Texas	Dell Diamond
East	Sugar Land Space Cowboys	Sugar Land, Texas	Constellation Field
West	Las Vegas Aviators	Summerlin, Nevada	Las Vegas Ballpark
West	Reno Aces	Reno, Nevada	Greater Nevada Field
West	Sacramento River Cats	West Sacramento, California	Sutter Health Park
West	Salt Lake Bees	South Jordan, Utah	The Ballpark at America First Square
West	Tacoma Rainiers	Tacoma, Washington	Cheney Stadium

==== Eastern League ====
Division	Team	Location	Venue
Northeast	Binghamton Rumble Ponies	Binghamton, New York	Mirabito Stadium
Northeast	Hartford Yard Goats	Hartford, Connecticut	Dunkin' Park
Northeast	New Hampshire Fisher Cats	Manchester, New Hampshire	Delta Dental Stadium
Northeast	Portland Sea Dogs	Portland, Maine	Delta Dental Park at Hadlock Field
Northeast	Reading Fightin Phils	Reading, Pennsylvania	FirstEnergy Stadium
Northeast	Somerset Patriots	Bridgewater, New Jersey	TD Bank Ballpark
Southeast	Akron RubberDucks	Akron, Ohio	7 17 Credit Union Park
Southeast	Altoona Curve	Altoona, Pennsylvania	Peoples Natural Gas Field
Southeast	Chesapeake Baysox	Bowie, Maryland	Prince George's Stadium
Southeast	Erie SeaWolves	Erie, Pennsylvania	UPMC Park
Southeast	Harrisburg Senators	Harrisburg, Pennsylvania	FNB Field
Southeast	Richmond Flying Squirrels	Richmond, Virginia	CarMax Park

==== Southern League ====
Division	Team	Location	Venue
North	Birmingham Barons	Birmingham, Alabama	Regions Field
North	Chattanooga Lookouts	Chattanooga, Tennessee	Erlanger Park
North	Knoxville Smokies	Knoxville, Tennessee	Covenant Health Park
North	Rocket City Trash Pandas	Madison, Alabama	Toyota Field
South	Biloxi Shuckers	Biloxi, Mississippi	Keesler Federal Park
South	Columbus Clingstones	Columbus, Georgia	Pinnacle Park
South	Montgomery Biscuits	Montgomery, Alabama	Dabos Park
South	Pensacola Blue Wahoos	Pensacola, Florida	Community Maritime Park

==== Texas League ====
Division	Team	Location	Venue
North	Arkansas Travelers	North Little Rock, Arkansas	Dickey–Stephens Park
North	Northwest Arkansas Naturals	Springdale, Arkansas	Arvest Ballpark
North	Ozarks Springbirds	Springfield, Missouri	Route 66 Stadium
North	Tulsa Drillers	Tulsa, Oklahoma	ONEOK Field
North	Wichita Turbo Tubs	Wichita, Kansas	Equity Bank Park
South	Amarillo Sod Poodles	Amarillo, Texas	Hodgetown
South	Corpus Christi Hooks	Corpus Christi, Texas	Whataburger Field
South	Frisco RoughRiders	Frisco, Texas	Riders Field
South	Midland RockHounds	Midland, Texas	Momentum Bank Ballpark
South	San Antonio Missions	San Antonio, Texas	Nelson W. Wolff Municipal Stadium

==== Midwest League ====
Division	Team	Location	Venue
East	Dayton Dragons	Dayton, Ohio	Day Air Ballpark
East	Fort Wayne TinCaps	Fort Wayne, Indiana	Parkview Field
East	Great Lakes Loons	Midland, Michigan	Dow Diamond
East	Lake County Captains	Eastlake, Ohio	Classic Auto Group Park
East	Lansing Lugnuts	Lansing, Michigan	Jackson Field
East	West Michigan Whitecaps	Comstock Park, Michigan	LMCU Ballpark
West	Beloit Sky Carp	Beloit, Wisconsin	ABC Supply Stadium
West	Cedar Rapids Kernels	Cedar Rapids, Iowa	Veterans Memorial Stadium
West	Peoria Chiefs	Peoria, Illinois	Dozer Park
West	Quad Cities River Bandits	Davenport, Iowa	Modern Woodmen Park
West	South Bend Cubs	South Bend, Indiana	Four Winds Field at Coveleski Stadium
West	Wisconsin Timber Rattlers	Appleton, Wisconsin	Neuroscience Group Field at Fox Cities Stadium

==== Northwest League ====
Team	Location	Venue
Eugene Emeralds	Eugene, Oregon	PK Park
Everett AquaSox	Everett, Washington	Everett Memorial Stadium
Hillsboro Hops	Hillsboro, Oregon	Hillsboro Hops Ballpark
Spokane Indians	Spokane, Washington	Avista Stadium
Tri-City Dust Devils	Pasco, Washington	Gesa Stadium
Vancouver Canadians	Vancouver, British Columbia	Nat Bailey Stadium

==== South Atlantic League ====
Division	Team	Location	Venue
North	Brooklyn Cyclones	Brooklyn, New York	Maimonides Park
North	Frederick Keys	Frederick, Maryland	Nymeo Field at Harry Grove Stadium
North	Greensboro Grasshoppers	Greensboro, North Carolina	First National Bank Field
North	Hudson Valley Renegades	Fishkill, New York	Heritage Financial Park
North	Jersey Shore BlueClaws	Lakewood, New Jersey	ShoreTown Ballpark
North	Wilmington Blue Rocks	Wilmington, Delaware	Daniel S. Frawley Stadium
South	Asheville Tourists	Asheville, North Carolina	HomeTrust Park
South	Bowling Green Hot Rods	Bowling Green, Kentucky	Bowling Green Ballpark
South	Greenville Drive	Greenville, South Carolina	Fluor Field at the West End
South	Hub City Spartanburgers	Spartanburg, South Carolina	Fifth Third Park
South	Rome Emperors	Rome, Georgia	AdventHealth Stadium
South	Winston-Salem Dash	Winston-Salem, North Carolina	Truist Stadium

==== California League ====
Division	Team	Location	Venue
North	Fresno Grizzlies	Fresno, California	Chukchansi Park
North	San Jose Giants	San Jose, California	Excite Ballpark
North	Stockton Ports	Stockton, California	Banner Island Ballpark
North	Visalia Rawhide	Visalia, California	Valley Strong Ballpark
South	Inland Empire 66ers	San Bernardino, California	San Manuel Stadium
South	Lake Elsinore Storm	Lake Elsinore, California	Lake Elsinore Diamond
South	Ontario Tower Buzzers	Ontario, California	ONT Field
South	Rancho Cucamonga Quakes	Rancho Cucamonga, California	Morongo Field

==== Carolina League ====
Division	Team	Location	Venue
North	Delmarva Shorebirds	Salisbury, Maryland	Arthur W. Perdue Stadium
North	Fayetteville Woodpeckers	Fayetteville, North Carolina	Segra Stadium
North	Fredericksburg Nationals	Fredericksburg, Virginia	Virginia Credit Union Stadium
North	Hill City Howlers	Lynchburg, Virginia	City Stadium
North	Salem RidgeYaks	Salem, Virginia	Carilion Clinic Field at Salem Memorial Ballpark
North	Wilson Warbirds	Wilson, North Carolina	Wilson Ballpark
South	Augusta GreenJackets	North Augusta, South Carolina	SRP Park
South	Charleston RiverDogs	Charleston, South Carolina	Joseph P. Riley Jr. Park
South	Columbia Fireflies	Columbia, South Carolina	Prisma Health Park
South	Hickory Crawdads	Hickory, North Carolina	L. P. Frans Stadium
South	Kannapolis Cannon Ballers	Kannapolis, North Carolina	Atrium Health Ballpark
South	Myrtle Beach Pelicans	Myrtle Beach, South Carolina	Pelicans Ballpark

==== Florida State League ====
Division	Team	Location	Venue
East	Daytona Tortugas	Daytona Beach, Florida	Jackie Robinson Ballpark
East	Jupiter Hammerheads	Jupiter, Florida	Roger Dean Stadium
East	Palm Beach Cardinals	Jupiter, Florida	Roger Dean Stadium
East	St. Lucie Mets	Port St. Lucie, Florida	Clover Park
West	Bradenton Marauders	Bradenton, Florida	LECOM Park
West	Clearwater Threshers	Clearwater, Florida	BayCare Ballpark
West	Dunedin Blue Jays	Dunedin, Florida	TD Ballpark
West	Fort Myers Mighty Mussels	Fort Myers, Florida	Hammond Stadium
West	Lakeland Flying Tigers	Lakeland, Florida	Publix Field at Joker Marchant Stadium
West	Tampa Tarpons	Tampa, Florida	George M. Steinbrenner Field

=== MLB Partner Leagues ===
==== American Association of Professional Baseball ====
Division	Team	Location	Venue
East	Chicago Dogs	Rosemont, Illinois	Impact Field
East	Gary SouthShore RailCats	Gary, Indiana	U.S. Steel Yard
East	Kansas City Monarchs	Kansas City, Kansas	Legends Field
East	Lake Country DockHounds	Oconomowoc, Wisconsin	Wisconsin Brewing Company Park
East	Milwaukee Milkmen	Franklin, Wisconsin	Franklin Field
West	Fargo-Moorhead RedHawks	Fargo, North Dakota	Newman Outdoor Field
West	Lincoln Saltdogs	Lincoln, Nebraska	Haymarket Park
West	Sioux City Explorers	Sioux City, Iowa	Lewis and Clark Park
West	Sioux Falls Canaries	Sioux Falls, South Dakota	Sioux Falls Stadium
West	Winnipeg Goldeyes	Winnipeg, Manitoba	Blue Cross Park
Future teams
	Blaine AAPB Team (2028)	Blaine, Minnesota	The Farm

==== Atlantic League of Professional Baseball ====
Division	Team	Location	Venue
North	Hagerstown Flying Boxcars	Hagerstown, Maryland	Meritus Park
North	Lancaster Stormers	Lancaster, Pennsylvania	Penn Medicine Park
North	Long Island Ducks	Central Islip, New York	Fairfield Properties Ballpark
North	Staten Island FerryHawks	Staten Island, New York	SIUH Community Park
North	York Revolution	York, Pennsylvania	WellSpan Park
South	Charleston Dirty Birds	Charleston, West Virginia	GoMart Ballpark
South	High Point Rockers	High Point, North Carolina	Truist Point
South	Lexington Legends	Lexington, Kentucky	CommonSpirit Ballpark
South	Southern Maryland Blue Crabs	Waldorf, Maryland	Blue Crabs Stadium

==== National Association of Professional Baseball ====
Conference	Division	Team	Location	Venue
Atlantic	East	Down East Bird Dawgs	Kinston, North Carolina	Grainger Stadium
Atlantic	East	New Jersey Jackals	Paterson, New Jersey	Hinchliffe Stadium
Atlantic	East	New York Boulders	Pomona, New York	Clover Stadium
Atlantic	East	Sussex County Miners	Augusta, New Jersey	Skylands Stadium
Atlantic	East	Washington Wild Things	Washington, Pennsylvania	EQT Park
Atlantic	North	Brockton Rox	Brockton, Massachusetts	Campanelli Stadium
Atlantic	North	Ottawa Titans	Ottawa, Ontario	Ottawa Stadium
Atlantic	North	Québec Capitales	Quebec City, Quebec	Stade Canac
Atlantic	North	Tri-City ValleyCats	Troy, New York	Joseph L. Bruno Stadium
Atlantic	North	Trois-Rivières Aigles	Trois-Rivières, Quebec	Stade Quillorama
Midwest	Central	Evansville Otters	Evansville, Indiana	Bosse Field
Midwest	Central	Florence Y'alls	Florence, Kentucky	Thomas More Stadium
Midwest	Central	Kane County Cougars	Geneva, Illinois	Northwestern Medicine Field
Midwest	Central	Lake Erie Crushers	Avon, Ohio	ForeFront Field
Midwest	Central	Schaumburg Boomers	Schaumburg, Illinois	Wintrust Field
Midwest	West	Cleburne Railroaders	Cleburne, Texas	La Moderna Field
Midwest	West	Gateway Grizzlies	Sauget, Illinois	Arsenal BG Ballpark
Midwest	West	Joliet Slammers	Joliet, Illinois	Slammers Stadium
Midwest	West	Mississippi Mud Monsters	Pearl, Mississippi	Trustmark Park
Midwest	West	Windy City ThunderBolts	Crestwood, Illinois	Ozinga Field

==== Pioneer League ====
Team	Location	Venue
Billings Mustangs	Billings, Montana	Dehler Park
Boise Hawks	Boise, Idaho	Memorial Stadium
Glacier Range Riders	Kalispell, Montana	Glacier Bank Park
Great Falls Voyagers	Great Falls, Montana	Centene Stadium
Idaho Falls Chukars	Idaho Falls, Idaho	Melaleuca Field
Long Beach Coast	Long Beach, California	Blair Field
Missoula PaddleHeads	Missoula, Montana	Ogren Park at Allegiance Field
Modesto Roadsters	Modesto, California	John Thurman Field
Oakland Ballers	Oakland, California	Raimondi Park
Ogden Raptors	Ogden, Utah	Lindquist Field
Orange County Baseball Club	Irvine, California	Great Park Baseball Stadium
Yuba-Sutter Freebirds	Marysville, California	Bryant Field

=== Independent Baseball Leagues ===
==== Canadian Baseball League ====
Team	Location	Venue
Barrie Baycats	Barrie, Ontario	Athletic Kulture Stadium
Brantford Red Sox	Brantford, Ontario	Arnold Anderson Stadium
Chatham-Kent Barnstormers	Chatham-Kent, Ontario	Fergie Jenkins Field
Guelph Royals	Guelph, Ontario	Hastings Stadium
Hamilton Cardinals	Hamilton, Ontario	Bernie Arbour Memorial Stadium
Kitchener Panthers	Kitchener, Ontario	Jack Couch Park
London Majors	London, Ontario	Labatt Memorial Park
Toronto Maple Leafs	Toronto, Ontario	Dominico Field
Welland Jackfish	Welland, Ontario	Welland Stadium

==== Pecos League ====
Division	Team	Location	Venue
Mountain	Alpine Cowboys	Alpine, Texas	Kokernot Field
Mountain	Blackwell FlyCatchers	Blackwell, Oklahoma	Morgan Field
Mountain	Garden City Wind	Garden City, Kansas	Clint Lightner Field
Mountain	Pecos Bills	Pecos, Texas	Martinez Field
Mountain	Roswell Invaders	Roswell, New Mexico	Joe Bauman Stadium
Mountain	Santa Fe Fuego	Santa Fe, New Mexico	Fort Marcy Ballfield
Mountain	Trinidad Triggers	Trinidad, Colorado	Central Park
Pacific	Bakersfield Train Robbers	Bakersfield, California	Sam Lynn Ballpark
Pacific	Burlingame Jellyfish	Burlingame, California	Washington Park
Pacific	Dublin Leprechauns	Dublin, California	Fallon Sports Park
Pacific	Grand Junction Razorback Suckers	Grand Junction, Colorado	Suplizio Field
Pacific	Martinez Sturgeon	Martinez, California	Waterfront Park
Pacific	San Rafael Pacifics	San Rafael, California	Albert Park
Pacific	Tucson Saguaros	Tucson, Arizona	Kino Stadium

==== Empire Professional Baseball League ====
Division	Team	Location	Venue
Adirondack	Malone Border Hounds	Malone, New York	Veterans Field
Adirondack	North County Thunderbirds	Fort Covington, New York	Road team
Adirondack	Saranac Lake Surge	Saranac Lake, New York	Petrova Field
Adirondack	Tupper Lake Riverpigs	Tupper Lake, New York	Raquette Pond Stadium
LA Zone	California Wiseguys	Los Angeles, California	TBD
LA Zone	LA Grinders	Los Angeles, California	TBD
LA Zone	Los Angeles Bullies	Los Angeles, California	TBD
LA Zone	Zona Flow	Los Angeles, California	TBD

==== United Shore Professional Baseball League ====
Team	Location	Venue
Birmingham-Bloomfield Beavers	Utica, Michigan	Jimmy John's Field
Eastside Diamond Hoppers	Utica, Michigan	Jimmy John's Field
Utica Unicorns	Utica, Michigan	Jimmy John's Field
Westside Woolly Mammoths	Utica, Michigan	Jimmy John's Field

=== Women's Pro Baseball League ===
Overview of WPBL Teams
Team	City Represented	Venue
Boston Hunters	Boston, Massachusetts	Robin Roberts Stadium, Springfield, Illinois
Los Angeles Queens	Los Angeles, California	Robin Roberts Stadium, Springfield, Illinois
New York Heights	New York City, New York	Robin Roberts Stadium, Springfield, Illinois
San Francisco Firebells	San Francisco, California	Robin Roberts Stadium, Springfield, Illinois

== Basketball ==
=== Men's leagues ===
==== National Basketball Association ====
Conference	Division	Team	Location	Venue
Eastern	Atlantic	Boston Celtics	Boston, Massachusetts	TD Garden
Eastern	Atlantic	Brooklyn Nets	Brooklyn, New York	Barclays Center
Eastern	Atlantic	New York Knicks	Manhattan, New York	Madison Square Garden
Eastern	Atlantic	Philadelphia 76ers	Philadelphia, Pennsylvania	Xfinity Mobile Arena (Note: Planned to be replaced by a new arena, also in Philadelphia, in 2030.)
Eastern	Atlantic	Toronto Raptors	Toronto, Ontario	Scotiabank Arena
Eastern	Central	Chicago Bulls	Chicago, Illinois	United Center
Eastern	Central	Cleveland Cavaliers	Cleveland, Ohio	Rocket Arena
Eastern	Central	Detroit Pistons	Detroit, Michigan	Little Caesars Arena
Eastern	Central	Indiana Pacers	Indianapolis, Indiana	Gainbridge Fieldhouse
Eastern	Central	Milwaukee Bucks	Milwaukee, Wisconsin	Fiserv Forum
Eastern	Southeast	Atlanta Hawks	Atlanta, Georgia	State Farm Arena
Eastern	Southeast	Charlotte Hornets	Charlotte, North Carolina	Spectrum Center
Eastern	Southeast	Miami Heat	Miami, Florida	Kaseya Center
Eastern	Southeast	Orlando Magic	Orlando, Florida	Kia Center
Eastern	Southeast	Washington Wizards	Washington, D.C.	Capital One Arena
Western	Northwest	Denver Nuggets	Denver, Colorado	Ball Arena
Western	Northwest	Minnesota Timberwolves	Minneapolis, Minnesota	Target Center
Western	Northwest	Oklahoma City Thunder	Oklahoma City, Oklahoma	Paycom Center (Note: Planned to be replaced by Continental Coliseum, also in Oklahoma City, in 2028.)
Western	Northwest	Portland Trail Blazers	Portland, Oregon	Moda Center
Western	Northwest	Utah Jazz	Salt Lake City, Utah	Delta Center
Western	Pacific	Golden State Warriors	San Francisco, California	Chase Center
Western	Pacific	Los Angeles Clippers	Inglewood, California	Intuit Dome
Western	Pacific	Los Angeles Lakers	Los Angeles, California	Crypto.com Arena
Western	Pacific	Phoenix Suns	Phoenix, Arizona	Mortgage Matchup Center
Western	Pacific	Sacramento Kings	Sacramento, California	Golden 1 Center
Western	Southwest	Dallas Mavericks	Dallas, Texas	American Airlines Center
Western	Southwest	Houston Rockets	Houston, Texas	Toyota Center
Western	Southwest	Memphis Grizzlies	Memphis, Tennessee	FedExForum
Western	Southwest	New Orleans Pelicans	New Orleans, Louisiana	Smoothie King Center
Western	Southwest	San Antonio Spurs	San Antonio, Texas	Frost Bank Center

==== NBA G League ====
Conference	Division	Team	Location	Venue
Eastern	East	Capital City Go-Go	Washington, D.C.	CareFirst Arena
Eastern	East	College Park Skyhawks	College Park, Georgia	Gateway Center Arena
Eastern	East	Delaware Blue Coats	Wilmington, Delaware	Chase Fieldhouse
Eastern	East	Long Island Nets	Uniondale, New York	Nassau Coliseum
Eastern	East	Maine Celtics	Portland, Maine	Portland Exposition Building
Eastern	East	Raptors 905	Mississauga, Ontario	Mississauga Sports and Entertainment Centre
Eastern	East	Westchester Knicks	White Plains, New York	Westchester County Center
Eastern	Central	Cleveland Charge	Cleveland, Ohio	Public Auditorium
Eastern	Central	Grand Rapids Gold	Grand Rapids, Michigan	Van Andel Arena
Eastern	Central	Motor City Cruise	Detroit, Michigan	Wayne State Fieldhouse
Eastern	Central	Noblesville Boom	Noblesville, Indiana	Riverview Health Arena at Innovation Mile
Eastern	Central	Windy City Bulls	Hoffman Estates, Illinois	Now Arena
Eastern	Central	Wisconsin Herd	Oshkosh, Wisconsin	Oshkosh Arena
Eastern	South	Greensboro Swarm	Greensboro, North Carolina	Novant Health Fieldhouse
Eastern	South	Laketown Squadron	Kenner, Louisiana	Pontchartrain Center
Eastern	South	Osceola Magic	Kissimmee, Florida	Silver Spurs Arena
Western	Central	Iowa Wolves	Des Moines, Iowa	Casey's Center
Western	Central	Sioux Falls Skyforce	Sioux Falls, South Dakota	Sanford Pentagon
Western	South	Austin Spurs	Cedar Park, Texas	H-E-B Center at Cedar Park
Western	South	Memphis Hustle	Southaven, Mississippi	Landers Center
Western	South	Mexico City Capitanes	Mexico City, Mexico	Mexico City Arena
Western	South	Rio Grande Valley Vipers	Edinburg, Texas	Bert Ogden Arena
Western	South	Texas Legends	Frisco, Texas	Comerica Center
Western	West	Coachella Valley Lakers	Thousand Palms, California	Acrisure Arena
Western	West	Oklahoma City Blue	Oklahoma City, Oklahoma	Paycom Center
Western	West	Rip City Remix	Portland, Oregon	Chiles Center
Western	West	Salt Lake City Stars	West Valley City, Utah	Maverik Center
Western	West	San Diego Clippers	Oceanside, California	Frontwave Arena
Western	West	Santa Cruz Warriors	Santa Cruz, California	Kaiser Permanente Arena
Western	West	Stockton Kings	Stockton, California	Adventist Health Arena
Western	West	Valley Suns	Tempe, Arizona	Mullett Arena

==== Canadian Elite Basketball League ====
Conference	Team	Location	Venue
Eastern	Brampton Honey Badgers	Brampton, Ontario	CAA Centre
Eastern	Montreal Alliance	Montreal, Quebec	Verdun Auditorium
Eastern	Niagara River Lions	St. Catharines, Ontario	Meridian Centre
Eastern	Ottawa Blackjacks	Ottawa, Ontario	TD Place Arena
Eastern	Scarborough Shooting Stars	Toronto, Ontario	Toronto Pan Am Sports Centre
Western	Calgary Surge	Calgary, Alberta	Winsport Arena
Western	Edmonton Stingers	Edmonton, Alberta	Edmonton Expo Centre
Western	Saskatoon Mamba	Saskatoon, Saskatchewan	Merlis Belsher Place
Western	Saskatoon Mamba	Saskatoon, Saskatchewan	SaskTel Centre
Western	Vancouver Bandits	Langley, British Columbia	Langley Events Centre
Western	Winnipeg Sea Bears	Winnipeg, Manitoba	Canada Life Centre
Future teams
	KW Titans (2027)	Kitchener, Ontario	Kitchener Memorial Auditorium

==== Basketball Super League ====
Team	Location	Venue
Kokomo BobKats	Kokomo, Indiana	Memorial Gymnasium
Lake Erie Jackals	Edinboro, Pennsylvania	Edinboro University
Lebanon Leprechauns	Lebanon, Indiana	Farmers Bank Fieldhouse
Newfoundland Rogues	St. John's, Newfoundland and Labrador	Mary Brown's Centre
Sudbury Five	Greater Sudbury, Ontario	Sudbury Community Arena
Windsor Express	Windsor, Ontario	WFCU Centre

==== The Basketball League ====
Conference	Division	Team	Location	Venue
East
East	Mid-Atlantic	DMV Soldiers	Charles County, Maryland	St. Charles High School
East	Mid-Atlantic	First State Misfits	Frankford, Delaware	The Factory Sports, Inc
East	Mid-Atlantic	Lehigh Valley Flight	Allentown, Pennsylvania	Lower Macungie Community Center
East	Mid-Atlantic	New England Kraken	Boston, Massachusetts	Kroc Center
East	Mid-Atlantic	Prince William Heat	Haymarket, Virginia	Battlefield High School
East	Mid-Atlantic	Tri-State Admirals	Elizabeth, New Jersey	Saint Elizabeth University
East	South Atlantic	Carolina Firebirds	Raleigh, North Carolina	St. Augustine's University
East	South Atlantic	Fayetteville Liberty	Fayetteville, North Carolina	Crown Coliseum
East	South Atlantic	Jacksonville 95ers	Jacksonville, Florida	First Coast High School
East	South Atlantic	Kissimmee Lambs	Kissimmee, Florida	Poinciana High School
East	South Atlantic	Tampa Bay Titans	Tampa, Florida	Tampa Preparatory School
Central		ADS Sentinels	Converse, Texas	ADS Sports Complex
Central		Creating Young Minds Leopards	Little Elm, Texas	Herschel Zellars Early Childhood Learning Center
Central		Dallas Stampede	Dallas, Texas	Singing Hills Recreation Center
Central		Enid Outlaws	Enid, Oklahoma	Stride Bank Center
Central		Little Rock Lightning	Little Rock, Arkansas	Hall STEAM Magnet High School
Central		Muskogee Sky Kings	Muskogee, Oklahoma	Ron D. Milam Gymnasium
Central		Potawatomi Fire	Shawnee, Oklahoma	FireLake Arena
Midwest		Columbus Wizards	Westerville, Ohio	Rike Center
Midwest		Glass City Wranglers	Toledo, Ohio	Glass City Center
Midwest		Grove City Whitetails	Grove City, Ohio	Central Crossing High School
Midwest		Hamilton County Huskers	Arcadia, Indiana	SAC Arena
Midwest		Lake County Legacy	Waukegan, Illinois	Waukegan High School
Midwest		St. Louis Griffins	Creve Coeur, Missouri	Saint Louis Priory School
Midwest		St. Louis Griffins	Wellston, Missouri	Normandy High School
West		4 Bears Roar	New Town, North Dakota	4 Bears Casino Event Center
West		GC Red Tails	Mattawa, Washington	Wahluke High School
West		Great Falls Electric	Great Falls, Montana	Great Falls High School
West		Tri Cities Sun Devils	Pasco, Washington	HAPO Center
West		Willamette Valley Jaguars	Corvallis, Oregon	Corvallis High School
West		Willamette Valley Jaguars	Corvallis, Oregon	Crescent Valley High School
West		Willamette Valley Jaguars	Eugene, Oregon	McArthur Court
Affiliate teams
		Florida Flight	Davie, Florida	Raiders Center
		Memphis Lions	Memphis, Tennessee	Travel team
		Mesa Monsoons	Chandler, Arizona	Paragon Charter Academy
		Mesa Monsoons	Mesa, Arizona	Mesa Community College
		Mesquite Desert Dogs	Mesquite, Nevada	Travel team
Future teams
		Clark County Trash Pandas (2027)	Vancouver, Washington	TBD
		Las Vegas Fortune (2027)	Las Vegas, Nevada	TBD
		Los Angeles Ignite (2027)	Los Angeles, California	Eagle's Nest Arena

==== United States Basketball League ====
Team	Location	Venue
Salem Capitals	Salem, Oregon	Salem Armory Auditorium
San Diego Surf	San Diego, California	MiraCosta College
Seattle Super Hawks	Seattle, Washington	Seattle Pacific University
Yakima Heat	Yakima, Washington	Yakima Valley College
Future team
Wenatchee Bighorns (2027)	Wenatchee, Washington	Wenatchee Valley College

==== 94x50 League ====
Conference	Team	Location	Venue
Eastern	Baltimore Rhythm	Bel Air, Maryland	Harford Community College
Eastern	Baltimore Rhythm	Towson, Maryland	Goucher College
Eastern	Capital Seahawks	Bowie, Maryland	Bowie State University
Eastern	Frederick Flying Cows	Frederick, Maryland	Woodsboro Bank Arena
Eastern	Jersey Shore Breaks	Belmar, New Jersey	St. Rose High School
Eastern	New York Phoenix	Schenectady, New York	M&T Bank Center
Eastern	Reading Rebels	Reading, Pennsylvania	Alvernia University
Eastern	Virginia Valley Vipers	Purcellville, Virginia	Patrick Henry College
Western	Lilac City Legends	Spokane, Washington	Numerica Veterans Arena
Western	San Diego Sharks	San Diego, California	Canyon Crest Academy
Western	Vancouver Bears	Vancouver, Washington	Hudson's Bay High School

=== Women's leagues ===
==== Women's National Basketball Association ====
Conference	Team	Location	Venue
Eastern	Atlanta Dream	College Park, Georgia	Gateway Center Arena (Note: Moving to State Farm Arena in downtown Atlanta in 2027.)
Eastern	Chicago Sky	Chicago, Illinois	Wintrust Arena
Eastern	Indiana Fever	Indianapolis, Indiana	Gainbridge Fieldhouse
Eastern	New York Liberty	Brooklyn, New York	Barclays Center
Eastern	Toronto Tempo	Toronto, Ontario	Coca-Cola Coliseum
Eastern	Washington Mystics	Washington, D.C.	CareFirst Arena
Western	Dallas Wings	Arlington, Texas	College Park Center (Note: Moving to American Airlines Center in downtown Dallas for the 2027 season, followed by a 2028 move to Dallas Memorial Auditorium, a facility within the downtown Kay Bailey Hutchison Convention Center.)
Western	Golden State Valkyries	San Francisco, California	Chase Center
Western	Houston Comets	Houston, Texas	Toyota Center
Western	Las Vegas Aces	Paradise, Nevada (Note: Mailing address is Las Vegas.)	Michelob Ultra Arena
Western	Los Angeles Sparks	Los Angeles, California	Crypto.com Arena
Western	Minnesota Lynx	Minneapolis, Minnesota	Target Center
Western	Phoenix Mercury	Phoenix, Arizona	Mortgage Matchup Center
Western	Portland Fire	Portland, Oregon	Moda Center
Western	Seattle Storm	Seattle, Washington	Climate Pledge Arena
Future teams
	Cleveland Sirens (2028)	Cleveland, Ohio	Rocket Arena
	Detroit WNBA team (2029)	Detroit, Michigan	Little Caesars Arena
	Philadelphia WNBA team (2030)	Philadelphia, Pennsylvania	New South Philadelphia Arena

==== Unrivaled ====
Unrivaled is a women's three-on-three basketball league with eight teams based in Medley, Florida. As of its first season in 2025, the minimum salary for a player was expected to be above $100,000. Equity in the league and revenue sharing is also expected to be offered to the players by the league.

The league expanded from its original six teams to eight in 2026.

Team	Location	Venue
Breeze BC	Medley, Florida	Mediapro Studios
Hive BC	Medley, Florida	Mediapro Studios
Laces BC	Medley, Florida	Mediapro Studios
Lunar Owls BC	Medley, Florida	Mediapro Studios
Mist BC	Medley, Florida	Mediapro Studios
Phantom BC	Medley, Florida	Mediapro Studios
Rose BC	Medley, Florida	Mediapro Studios
Vinyl BC	Medley, Florida	Mediapro Studios

==== UpShot League ====
The UpShot League is a developmental women's basketball league with four teams, all based in the Southern United States. Player compensation is yet to be publicly announced.

Team	Location	Venue
Baltimore Starlings	Catonsville, Maryland	Chesapeake Employers Insurance Arena
Charlotte Crown	Charlotte, North Carolina	Bojangles Coliseum
Greensboro Groove	Greensboro, North Carolina	Novant Health Fieldhouse
Nashville Vibe	Nashville, Tennessee	Memorial Gymnasium
Jacksonville Waves	Jacksonville, Florida	VyStar Veterans Memorial Arena
Savannah Steel	Savannah, Georgia	Enmarket Arena
UpShot Providence	Providence, Rhode Island	Amica Mutual Pavilion
UpShot Tampa	Tampa, Florida	Yuengling Center

== Cricket ==
=== Major League Cricket ===
Team	Location	Venue
Los Angeles Knight Riders	Pomona, California	Knight Riders Cricket Field
MI New York	New York, New York	Travel team
San Francisco Unicorns	Oakland, California	Oakland Coliseum
Seattle Orcas	Seattle, Washington	Travel team
Texas Super Kings	Grand Prairie, Texas	Grand Prairie Stadium
Washington Freedom	Washington, D.C.	Travel team

== Curling ==
=== Rock League ===
Team	Represents
Alpine Curling Club	Europe
Frontier Curling Club	United States
Maple United	Canada
Northern United	Europe
Shield Curling Club	Canada
Typhoon Curling Club	Asia-Pacific

== Football ==
=== National Football League ===
Conference	Division	Team	Location	Venue
AFC	East	Buffalo Bills	Orchard Park, New York	Highmark Stadium
AFC	East	Miami Dolphins	Miami Gardens, Florida	Hard Rock Stadium
AFC	East	New England Patriots	Foxborough, Massachusetts	Gillette Stadium
AFC	East	New York Jets	East Rutherford, New Jersey	MetLife Stadium
AFC	North	Baltimore Ravens	Baltimore, Maryland	M&T Bank Stadium
AFC	North	Cincinnati Bengals	Cincinnati, Ohio	Paycor Stadium
AFC	North	Cleveland Browns	Cleveland, Ohio	Huntington Bank Field (Note: Planned to be replaced by New Huntington Bank Field in Brook Park, Ohio in 2030.)
AFC	North	Pittsburgh Steelers	Pittsburgh, Pennsylvania	Acrisure Stadium
AFC	South	Houston Texans	Houston, Texas	Reliant Stadium
AFC	South	Indianapolis Colts	Indianapolis, Indiana	Lucas Oil Stadium
AFC	South	Jacksonville Jaguars	Jacksonville, Florida	EverBank Stadium
AFC	South	Tennessee Titans	Nashville, Tennessee	Nissan Stadium (Note: To be replaced by New Nissan Stadium, across the street from the current stadium, in 2027.)
AFC	West	Denver Broncos	Denver, Colorado	Empower Field at Mile High (Note: Planned to be replaced by New Broncos Stadium, also in Denver, in 2031.)
AFC	West	Kansas City Chiefs	Kansas City, Missouri	Arrowhead Stadium (Note: Planned to be replaced by New Chiefs Stadium in Kansas City, Kansas in 2031.)
AFC	West	Las Vegas Raiders	Paradise, Nevada	Allegiant Stadium
AFC	West	Los Angeles Chargers	Inglewood, California	SoFi Stadium
NFC	East	Dallas Cowboys	Arlington, Texas	AT&T Stadium
NFC	East	New York Giants	East Rutherford, New Jersey	MetLife Stadium
NFC	East	Philadelphia Eagles	Philadelphia, Pennsylvania	Lincoln Financial Field
NFC	East	Washington Commanders	Landover, Maryland	Northwest Stadium (Note: Planning to move to the New Stadium at RFK Campus in Washington, D.C. in 2030.)
NFC	North	Chicago Bears	Chicago, Illinois	Soldier Field (Note: Planned to be replaced by a venue tentatively known as Chicago Bears Stadium at a location to be determined in the Chicago metropolitan area in 2029.)
NFC	North	Detroit Lions	Detroit, Michigan	Ford Field
NFC	North	Green Bay Packers	Green Bay, Wisconsin	Lambeau Field
NFC	North	Minnesota Vikings	Minneapolis, Minnesota	U.S. Bank Stadium
NFC	South	Atlanta Falcons	Atlanta, Georgia	Mercedes-Benz Stadium
NFC	South	Carolina Panthers	Charlotte, North Carolina	Bank of America Stadium
NFC	South	New Orleans Saints	New Orleans, Louisiana	Caesars Superdome
NFC	South	Tampa Bay Buccaneers	Tampa, Florida	Raymond James Stadium
NFC	West	Arizona Cardinals	Glendale, Arizona	State Farm Stadium
NFC	West	Los Angeles Rams	Inglewood, California	SoFi Stadium
NFC	West	San Francisco 49ers	Santa Clara, California	Levi's Stadium
NFC	West	Seattle Seahawks	Seattle, Washington	Lumen Field

=== Canadian Football League ===
Conference	Team	Location	Venue
East	Hamilton Tiger-Cats	Hamilton, Ontario	Hamilton Stadium
East	Montreal Alouettes	Montreal, Quebec	Percival Molson Memorial Stadium
East	Ottawa Redblacks	Ottawa, Ontario	TD Place Stadium
East	Toronto Argonauts	Toronto, Ontario	BMO Field
West	BC Lions	Vancouver, British Columbia	BC Place
West	Calgary Stampeders	Calgary, Alberta	McMahon Stadium
West	Edmonton Elks	Edmonton, Alberta	Commonwealth Stadium
West	Saskatchewan Roughriders	Regina, Saskatchewan	Mosaic Stadium
West	Winnipeg Blue Bombers	Winnipeg, Manitoba	Princess Auto Stadium

=== United Football League ===
Team	Location	Venue
Colorado Stampede	Colorado Springs, Colorado	Weidner Field
Columbus Aviators	Columbus, Ohio	Historic Crew Stadium
Dallas Renegades	Frisco, Texas	Toyota Stadium
DC Defenders	Washington, D.C.	Audi Field
Louisville Kings	Louisville, Kentucky	Lynn Family Stadium
Orlando Storm	Orlando, Florida	Inter.co Stadium
Rhode Island Breakers	Pawtucket, Rhode Island	Centreville Bank Stadium
St. Louis Battlehawks	St. Louis, Missouri	The Dome at America's Center
Future teams
Oklahoma UFL team (2028)	Oklahoma City, Oklahoma	Oklahoma City Stadium
Utah UFL team (2028)	Sandy, Utah	America First Field

=== Continental Football League ===
Division	Team	Location	Venue
North	Cincinnati Dukes	Mason, Ohio	Atrium Stadium
North	Indianapolis Capitols	Westfield, Indiana	Grand Park Sports Campus
North	Milwaukee Silverbacks	Milwaukee, Wisconsin	TBD
South	San Antonio Toros	Castle Hills, Texas	Wheatley Heights Sports Complex
South	Tall City Black Gold	Midland, Texas	Astound Broadband Stadium
South	Texas Syndicate	Austin, Texas	The Pfield

=== American Arena League ===
Conference	Team	Location	Venue
Eastern	Columbus Lions	Columbus, Georgia	Columbus Civic Center
Eastern	Jersey Bearcats	Morristown, New Jersey	Mennen Arena
Eastern	Montgomery Catfish	Montgomery, Alabama	Garrett Coliseum
Eastern	Ohio Legends	Marion, Ohio	Veterans Memorial Coliseum
Eastern	Rome Red Cats	Rome, Georgia	Forum River Center
Eastern	Virginia Haulers	Wytheville, Virginia	Hitachi Energy Arena
Western	Memphis Blues	Cordova, Tennessee	Agricenter Showplace Arena
Western	Mississippi Wolfpack	Southaven, Mississippi	Landers Center
Western	North Texas Steam	Denton, Texas	Lovelace & McNatt Families Practice Facility
Western	Texas Desperados	Lufkin, Texas	Angelina County Exposition Center
Western	Texas Wild Hogs	San Antonio, Texas	San Antonio Rose Palace
Western	Tri-City Horsemen	Kearney, Nebraska	Landmark Implement Arena

=== Arena Football One ===
Team	Location	Venue
Albany Firebirds	Albany, New York	MVP Arena
Austin Bulls	Belton, Texas	Huntington Bank Expo
Beaumont Renegades	Beaumont, Texas	Ford Arena
Kentucky Barrels	Highland Heights, Kentucky	Truist Arena
Michigan Arsenal	Saginaw, Michigan	Dow Event Center
Minnesota Monsters	Saint Paul, Minnesota	Lee & Penny Anderson Arena
Nashville Kats	Clarksville, Tennessee	F&M Bank Arena
San Diego Stealth	San Diego, California	Pechanga Arena
Washington Wolfpack	Everett, Washington	Angel of the Winds Arena

=== Indoor Football League ===
Conference	Team	Location	Venue
Eastern	Arkansas Diamonds	Little Rock, Arkansas	Barton Coliseum
Eastern	Athens Crush	Athens, Georgia	Akins Ford Arena
Eastern	Fishers Freight	Fishers, Indiana	Fishers Event Center
Eastern	Green Bay Blizzard	Ashwaubenon, Wisconsin	Resch Center
Eastern	Iowa Barnstormers	Des Moines, Iowa	Casey's Center
Eastern	Jacksonville Sharks	Jacksonville, Florida	VyStar Veterans Memorial Arena
Eastern	Orlando Pirates	Orlando, Florida	Kia Center
Eastern	Quad City Steamwheelers	Moline, Illinois	Vibrant Arena at The MARK
Eastern	Savannah Leprechauns	Savannah, Georgia	Enmarket Arena
Western	Arizona Rattlers	Glendale, Arizona	Desert Diamond Arena
Western	New Mexico Chupacabras	Albuquerque, New Mexico	Tingley Coliseum
Western	Northern Arizona Wranglers	Prescott Valley, Arizona	Findlay Toyota Center
Western	San Antonio Gunslingers	San Antonio, Texas	Freeman Coliseum
Western	San Diego Strike Force	Oceanside, California	Frontwave Arena
Western	Tucson Sugar Skulls	Tucson, Arizona	Tucson Convention Center
Western	Tulsa Oilers	Tulsa, Oklahoma	BOK Center
Western	Vegas Knight Hawks	Henderson, Nevada	Lee's Family Forum

=== National Arena League ===
Team	Location	Venue
Amarillo Warbirds	Amarillo, Texas	Amarillo Civic Center
Colorado Spartans	Denver, Colorado	Denver Coliseum
Dallas Apex	Mesquite, Texas	Gomez Western Wear Arena
Louisiana Rouxgaroux	Bossier City, Louisiana	Brookshire Grocery Arena
Omaha Beef	Ralston, Nebraska	Liberty First Credit Union Arena
Pueblo Punishers	Pueblo, Colorado	Southwest Motors Events Center
Salina Liberty	Salina, Kansas	Tony's Pizza Events Center
Sioux City Bandits	Sioux City, Iowa	Tyson Events Center
Southwest Kansas Storm	Dodge City, Kansas	United Wireless Arena
Wheeling Miners	Wheeling, West Virginia	WesBanco Arena

=== The Arena League ===
Team	Location	Venue
Eau Claire Axemen	Eau Claire, Wisconsin	Sonnentag Event Center
Iowa Woo	Waterloo, Iowa	UNI-Dome
Monroe Greenheads	Monroe, Louisiana	Monroe Civic Center
Nebraska Siege	Grand Island, Nebraska	BigIron Events Center
Ozarks Lunkers	Springfield, Missouri	Wilson Logistics Arena
St. Joseph Goats	St. Joseph, Missouri	St. Joseph Civic Arena

=== X League ===
Conference	Team	Location	Venue
Eastern	Atlanta Empire	Duluth, Georgia	Gas South Arena
Eastern	Chicago Blitz	Rockford, Illinois	BMO Center
Eastern	Miami Tequestas	Miami, Florida	TBD
Eastern	New England Defenders	East Hartford, Connecticut	Pratt & Whitney Stadium at Rentschler Field
Western	Dallas Sound	Dallas, Texas	TBD
Western	Denver Rush	Loveland, Colorado	Blue Arena
Western	Los Angeles Black Storm	Irvine, California	Championship Soccer Stadium
Western	Seattle Thunder	Kent, Washington	accesso ShoWare Center

== Golf ==
=== TGL ===
Team	Represents	Venue
Atlanta Drive GC	Atlanta, Georgia	SoFi Center, Palm Beach Gardens, Florida
The Bay Golf Club	San Francisco, California	SoFi Center, Palm Beach Gardens, Florida
Boston Common Golf	Boston, Massachusetts	SoFi Center, Palm Beach Gardens, Florida
Jupiter Links GC	Miami, Florida	SoFi Center, Palm Beach Gardens, Florida
Los Angeles Golf Club	Los Angeles, California	SoFi Center, Palm Beach Gardens, Florida
Motor City Golf Club	Detroit, Michigan	SoFi Center, Palm Beach Gardens, Florida
New York Golf Club	New York, New York	SoFi Center, Palm Beach Gardens, Florida

== Ice hockey ==
=== Men's leagues ===
==== National Hockey League ====
Conference	Division	Team	Location	Venue
Eastern	Metropolitan	Carolina Hurricanes	Raleigh, North Carolina	Lenovo Center
Eastern	Metropolitan	Columbus Blue Jackets	Columbus, Ohio	Nationwide Arena
Eastern	Metropolitan	New Jersey Devils	Newark, New Jersey	Prudential Center
Eastern	Metropolitan	New York Islanders	Elmont, New York	UBS Arena
Eastern	Metropolitan	New York Rangers	Manhattan, New York	Madison Square Garden
Eastern	Metropolitan	Philadelphia Flyers	Philadelphia, Pennsylvania	Xfinity Mobile Arena (Note: Planned to be replaced by a new arena, also in Philadelphia, in 2030.)
Eastern	Metropolitan	Pittsburgh Penguins	Pittsburgh, Pennsylvania	PPG Paints Arena
Eastern	Metropolitan	Washington Capitals	Washington, D.C.	Capital One Arena
Eastern	Atlantic	Boston Bruins	Boston, Massachusetts	TD Garden
Eastern	Atlantic	Buffalo Sabres	Buffalo, New York	KeyBank Center
Eastern	Atlantic	Detroit Red Wings	Detroit, Michigan	Little Caesars Arena
Eastern	Atlantic	Florida Panthers	Sunrise, Florida	Amerant Bank Arena
Eastern	Atlantic	Montreal Canadiens	Montreal, Quebec	Bell Centre
Eastern	Atlantic	Ottawa Senators	Ottawa, Ontario	Canadian Tire Centre
Eastern	Atlantic	Tampa Bay Lightning	Tampa, Florida	Benchmark International Arena
Eastern	Atlantic	Toronto Maple Leafs	Toronto, Ontario	Scotiabank Arena
Western	Central	Chicago Blackhawks	Chicago, Illinois	United Center
Western	Central	Colorado Avalanche	Denver, Colorado	Ball Arena
Western	Central	Dallas Stars	Dallas, Texas	American Airlines Center
Western	Central	Minnesota Wild	Saint Paul, Minnesota	Grand Casino Arena
Western	Central	Nashville Predators	Nashville, Tennessee	Bridgestone Arena
Western	Central	St. Louis Blues	St. Louis, Missouri	Enterprise Center
Western	Central	Utah Mammoth	Salt Lake City, Utah	Delta Center
Western	Central	Winnipeg Jets	Winnipeg, Manitoba	Canada Life Centre
Western	Pacific	Anaheim Ducks	Anaheim, California	Honda Center
Western	Pacific	Calgary Flames	Calgary, Alberta	Scotiabank Saddledome (Note: To be replaced by Scotia Place, also in Calgary, in 2027.)
Western	Pacific	Edmonton Oilers	Edmonton, Alberta	Rogers Place
Western	Pacific	Los Angeles Kings	Los Angeles, California	Crypto.com Arena
Western	Pacific	San Jose Sharks	San Jose, California	SAP Center
Western	Pacific	Seattle Kraken	Seattle, Washington	Climate Pledge Arena
Western	Pacific	Vancouver Canucks	Vancouver, British Columbia	Rogers Arena
Western	Pacific	Vegas Golden Knights	Paradise, Nevada	T-Mobile Arena

==== American Hockey League ====
Conference	Division	Team	Location	Venue
Eastern	Atlantic	Charlotte Checkers	Charlotte, North Carolina	Bojangles Coliseum
Eastern	Atlantic	Hartford Wolf Pack	Hartford, Connecticut	PeoplesBank Arena
Eastern	Atlantic	Hershey Bears	Hershey, Pennsylvania	Giant Center
Eastern	Atlantic	Lehigh Valley Phantoms	Allentown, Pennsylvania	PPL Center
Eastern	Atlantic	Providence Bruins	Providence, Rhode Island	Amica Mutual Pavilion
Eastern	Atlantic	Springfield Thunderbirds	Springfield, Massachusetts	MassMutual Center
Eastern	Atlantic	Wilkes-Barre/Scranton Penguins	Wilkes-Barre, Pennsylvania	Mohegan Sun Arena at Casey Plaza
Eastern	North	Belleville Senators	Belleville, Ontario	CIBC Place
Eastern	North	Cleveland Monsters	Cleveland, Ohio	Rocket Arena
Eastern	North	Hamilton Hammers	Hamilton, Ontario	TD Coliseum
Eastern	North	Laval Rocket	Laval, Quebec	Place Bell
Eastern	North	Rochester Americans	Rochester, New York	Blue Cross Arena
Eastern	North	Syracuse Crunch	Syracuse, New York	Upstate Medical University Arena
Eastern	North	Toronto Marlies	Toronto, Ontario	Coca-Cola Coliseum
Eastern	North	Utica Comets	Utica, New York	NBT Bank Arena at the Utica Memorial Auditorium
Western	Central	Chicago Wolves	Rosemont, Illinois	Allstate Arena
Western	Central	Grand Rapids Griffins	Grand Rapids, Michigan	Van Andel Arena
Western	Central	Iowa Wild	Des Moines, Iowa	Casey's Center
Western	Central	Manitoba Moose	Winnipeg, Manitoba	Canada Life Centre
Western	Central	Milwaukee Admirals	Milwaukee, Wisconsin	UW–Milwaukee Panther Arena
Western	Central	Rockford IceHogs	Rockford, Illinois	BMO Center
Western	Central	Texas Stars	Cedar Park, Texas	H-E-B Center at Cedar Park
Western	Pacific	Abbotsford Canucks	Abbotsford, British Columbia	Rogers Forum
Western	Pacific	Bakersfield Condors	Bakersfield, California	Dignity Health Arena
Western	Pacific	Calgary Wranglers	Calgary, Alberta	Scotiabank Saddledome (Note: To be replaced by Scotia Place, also in Calgary, in 2027.)
Western	Pacific	Coachella Valley Firebirds	Thousand Palms, California	Acrisure Arena
Western	Pacific	Colorado Eagles	Loveland, Colorado	Blue Arena
Western	Pacific	Henderson Silver Knights	Henderson, Nevada	Lee's Family Forum
Western	Pacific	Ontario Reign	Ontario, California	Toyota Arena
Western	Pacific	San Diego Gulls	San Diego, California	Pechanga Arena
Western	Pacific	San Jose Barracuda	San Jose, California	Tech CU Arena
Western	Pacific	Tucson Roadrunners	Tucson, Arizona	Tucson Convention Center

==== ECHL ====
Conference	Division	Team	Location	Venue
Eastern	North	Adirondack Thunder	Glens Falls, New York	Harding Mazzotti Arena
Eastern	North	Greensboro Gargoyles	Greensboro, North Carolina	First Horizon Coliseum
Eastern	North	Maine Mariners	Portland, Maine	Cross Insurance Arena
Eastern	North	Norfolk Admirals	Norfolk, Virginia	Norfolk Scope
Eastern	North	Reading Royals	Reading, Pennsylvania	Santander Arena
Eastern	North	Trenton Ironhawks	Trenton, New Jersey	CURE Insurance Arena
Eastern	North	Trois-Rivières Lions	Trois-Rivières, Quebec	Colisée Vidéotron
Eastern	North	Worcester Railers	Worcester, Massachusetts	DCU Center
Eastern	South	Atlanta Gladiators	Duluth, Georgia	Gas South Arena
Eastern	South	Florida Everblades	Estero, Florida	Hertz Arena
Eastern	South	Greenville Swamp Rabbits	Greenville, South Carolina	Bon Secours Wellness Arena
Eastern	South	Jacksonville Icemen	Jacksonville, Florida	VyStar Veterans Memorial Arena
Eastern	South	Orlando Solar Bears	Orlando, Florida	Kia Center
Eastern	South	Savannah Ghost Pirates	Savannah, Georgia	Enmarket Arena
Eastern	South	South Carolina Stingrays	North Charleston, South Carolina	North Charleston Coliseum
Western	Central	Bloomington Bison	Bloomington, Illinois	Grossinger Motors Arena
Western	Central	Cincinnati Cyclones	Cincinnati, Ohio	Heritage Bank Center
Western	Central	Fort Wayne Komets	Fort Wayne, Indiana	Allen County War Memorial Coliseum
Western	Central	Indy Fuel	Fishers, Indiana	Fishers Event Center
Western	Central	Kalamazoo Wings	Kalamazoo, Michigan	Wings Event Center
Western	Central	Toledo Walleye	Toledo, Ohio	Huntington Center
Western	Central	Wheeling Nailers	Wheeling, West Virginia	WesBanco Arena
Western	Mountain	Allen Americans	Allen, Texas	Credit Union of Texas Event Center
Western	Mountain	Idaho Steelheads	Boise, Idaho	Idaho Central Arena
Western	Mountain	Kansas City Mavericks	Independence, Missouri	Cable Dahmer Arena
Western	Mountain	New Mexico Goatheads	Rio Rancho, New Mexico	Rio Rancho Events Center
Western	Mountain	Rapid City Rush	Rapid City, South Dakota	The Monument
Western	Mountain	Tahoe Knight Monsters	Stateline, Nevada	Tahoe Blue Event Center
Western	Mountain	Tulsa Oilers	Tulsa, Oklahoma	BOK Center
Western	Mountain	Wichita Thunder	Wichita, Kansas	Intrust Bank Arena
On hiatus
		Iowa Heartlanders (2027)	Coralville, Iowa	Xtream Arena
Future teams
		Augusta Lynx (2027)	Augusta, Georgia	New Augusta Arena

==== Federal Prospects Hockey League ====
Conference	Division	Team	Location	Venue
Eastern	Atlantic	Binghamton Black Bears	Binghamton, New York	Visions Veterans Memorial Arena
Eastern	Atlantic	Blue Ridge Bobcats	Wytheville, Virginia	Hitachi Energy Arena
Eastern	Atlantic	Danbury Hat Tricks	Danbury, Connecticut	Danbury Ice Arena
Eastern	Atlantic	Twin City Thunderbirds	Winston-Salem, North Carolina	Winston-Salem Fairgrounds Arena
Eastern	Great Lakes	Indiana Sentinels	Columbus, Indiana	Hamilton Community Center & Ice Arena
Eastern	Great Lakes	Motor City Rockers	Wyandotte, Michigan	Yack Arena
Eastern	Great Lakes	Port Huron Prowlers	Port Huron, Michigan	McMorran Place
Eastern	Great Lakes	Watertown Wolves	Watertown, New York	Northern Credit Union Community Arena
Western	Delta	Baton Rouge Kingfish	Baton Rouge, Louisiana	Raising Cane's River Center Arena
Western	Delta	Columbus River Dragons	Columbus, Georgia	Columbus Civic Center
Western	Delta	Mid-South Monarchs	Southaven, Mississippi	Landers Center
Western	Delta	Monroe Moccasins	Monroe, Louisiana	Monroe Civic Center
Western	Frontier	Fresno Falcons	Fresno, California	Selland Arena
Western	Frontier	Minnesota Northern Lights	Thief River Falls, Minnesota	Ralph Engelstad Arena
Western	Frontier	Oceanside Shock	Oceanside, California	Frontwave Arena
Western	Frontier	Stockon Thunder	Stockton, California	Adventist Health Arena
Western	Frontier	Topeka Scarecrows	Topeka, Kansas	Stormont Vail Events Center

==== Ligue Nord-Américaine de Hockey ====
Team	Location	Venue
Jonquière Marquis	Saguenay, Quebec	Palais des Sports de Saguenay
Manotick Mariners	Ottawa, Ontario	Mike O'Neil Arena
National de Québec	L'Ancienne-Lorette, Quebec	Complexe Sportif Bonair
Rivière-du-Loup 3L	Rivière-du-Loup, Quebec	Centre Premier Tech
Saint-Georges Cool FM 103.5	Saint-Georges, Quebec	Centre Sportif Lacroix-Dutil
Saint-Hyacinthe Bataillon	Saint-Hyacinthe, Quebec	Stade L.P. Gaucher
Sorel-Tracy Éperviers	Sorel-Tracy, Quebec	Colisée Cardin
Thetford Assurancia	Thetford Mines, Quebec	Centre Mario Gosselin

==== SPHL ====
Team	Location	Venue
Athens Rock Lobsters	Athens, Georgia	Akins Ford Arena
Birmingham Bulls	Pelham, Alabama	Pelham Civic Center
Evansville Thunderbolts	Evansville, Indiana	Ford Center
Fayetteville Marksmen	Fayetteville, North Carolina	Crown Coliseum
Huntsville Havoc	Huntsville, Alabama	Von Braun Center
Knoxville Ice Bears	Knoxville, Tennessee	Knoxville Civic Coliseum
Macon Mayhem	Macon, Georgia	Macon Coliseum
Pee Dee IceCats	Florence, South Carolina	Florence Center
Pensacola Ice Flyers	Pensacola, Florida	Pensacola Bay Center
Peoria Rivermen	Peoria, Illinois	Carver Arena
Quad City Storm	Moline, Illinois	Vibrant Arena at The MARK
Roanoke Rail Yard Dawgs	Roanoke, Virginia	Berglund Center
Future Team
Mobile Mysticks (2027)	Mobile, Alabama	Regions Arena

=== Professional Women's Hockey League ===
Conference	Team	Location	Venue
Eastern	Boston Fleet	Boston, Massachusetts	Agganis Arena
Eastern	Hamilton Havoc	Hamilton, Ontario	TD Coliseum
Eastern	Montreal Victoire	Laval, Quebec	Place Bell
Eastern	New York Sirens	Newark, New Jersey	Prudential Center
Eastern	Ottawa Charge	Ottawa, Ontario	Canadian Tire Centre
Eastern	Toronto Sceptres	Toronto, Ontario	Coca-Cola Coliseum
Western	Detroit Clutch	Detroit, Michigan	Little Caesars Arena
Western	Minnesota Frost	Saint Paul, Minnesota	Grand Casino Arena
Western	San Jose Sea Lions	San Jose, California	SAP Center
Western	Seattle Torrent	Seattle, Washington	Climate Pledge Arena
Western	Vancouver Goldeneyes	Vancouver, British Columbia	Pacific Coliseum
Western	Vegas Vanguards	Paradise, Nevada (Note: Mailing address is Las Vegas.)	T-Mobile Arena

== Lacrosse ==
=== National Lacrosse League ===
The National Lacrosse League is a men's box lacrosse league with fourteen teams: four in the Northeastern United States, three each in Eastern Canada, Western Canada, and the Western United States, and one in the Southern United States. As of its 2018 season, the minimum salary was US$10,208 for rookies, US$12,196 for second-year players, and US$15,165 for third-year players and older.

Team	Location	Venue
Buffalo Bandits	Buffalo, New York	KeyBank Center
Calgary Roughnecks	Calgary, Alberta	Scotiabank Saddledome (Note: To be replaced by Scotia Place, also in Calgary, in 2027.)
Colorado Mammoth	Denver, Colorado	Ball Arena
Georgia Swarm	Duluth, Georgia	Gas South Arena
Halifax Thunderbirds	Halifax, Nova Scotia	Scotiabank Centre
Las Vegas Desert Dogs	Henderson, Nevada	Lee's Family Forum
Oshawa FireWolves	Oshawa, Ontario	Tribute Communities Centre
Rochester Knighthawks	Rochester, New York	Blue Cross Arena
San Diego Seals	Oceanside, California	Frontwave Arena
Saskatchewan Rush	Saskatoon, Saskatchewan	SaskTel Centre
Toronto Rock	Hamilton, Ontario	TD Coliseum
Vancouver Warriors	Vancouver, British Columbia	Rogers Arena

=== Premier Lacrosse League ===
The Premier Lacrosse League is a men's field lacrosse league with eight teams: three each in the Northeastern and Western United States, and two in the Southern United States. As of its 2022 season, the minimum salary for a player was $25,000.

Conference	Team	Location	Venue
Eastern	Boston Cannons	Boston, Massachusetts	Harvard Stadium
Eastern	Maryland Whipsnakes	Baltimore, Maryland	Awalt Field
Eastern	New York Atlas	Hempstead, New York	James M. Shuart Stadium
Eastern	Philadelphia Waterdogs	Chester, Pennsylvania	Subaru Park
Western	California Redwoods	San Diego, California	Torero Stadium
Western	Carolina Chaos	Charlotte, North Carolina	American Legion Memorial Stadium
Western	Denver Outlaws	Denver, Colorado	Barton Stadium
Western	Utah Archers	Herriman, Utah	Zions Bank Stadium

=== Women's Lacrosse League ===
The Women's Lacrosse League is a women's lacrosse sixes league with four teams: two in the Northeastern United States, and one each in the Southern and Western United States. Player compensation is yet to be publicly announced.

Team	Location	Venue
Boston Guard	Boston, Massachusetts	Harvard Stadium
California Palms	San Diego, California	Torero Stadium
Maryland Charm	Baltimore, Maryland	Ridley Athletic Complex
New York Charging	Hempstead, New York	James M. Shuart Stadium

== Motorsports ==
=== NTT IndyCar Series ===
Team	Based
A.J. Foyt Enterprises	Waller, Texas
Andretti Global	Indianapolis, Indiana
Arrow McLaren	Indianapolis, Indiana
Chip Ganassi Racing	Indianapolis, Indiana
Dale Coyne Racing	Plainfield, Illinois
Dreyer & Reinbold Racing	Carmel, Indiana
ECR	Indianapolis, Indiana
Juncos Hollinger Racing	Indianapolis, Indiana
Meyer Shank Racing with Curb-Agajanian	Pataskala, Ohio
Rahal Letterman Lanigan Racing	Zionsville, Indiana
Team Penske	Mooresville, North Carolina
On hiatus
Prema Racing	Fishers, Indiana

=== NASCAR Cup Series ===
Team	Based
23XI Racing	Mooresville, North Carolina
Beard Motorsports	Mooresville, North Carolina
Front Row Motorsports	Mooresville, North Carolina
Hendrick Motorsports	Concord, North Carolina
Hyak Motorsports	Harrisburg, North Carolina
Joe Gibbs Racing	Huntersville, North Carolina
Kaulig Racing	Welcome, North Carolina
Legacy Motor Club	Mooresville, North Carolina
Live Fast Motorsports	Mooresville, North Carolina
MBM Motorsports	Statesville, North Carolina
NY Racing Team	Statesville, North Carolina
RFK Racing	Concord, North Carolina
Richard Childress Racing	Welcome, North Carolina
Rick Ware Racing	Mooresville, North Carolina
Spire Motorsports	Concord, North Carolina
Haas Factory Team	Kannapolis, North Carolina
Team Hezeberg	Mooresville, North Carolina
Team Penske	Mooresville, North Carolina
Trackhouse Racing Team	Concord, North Carolina
Wood Brothers Racing	Mooresville, North Carolina

=== IMSA WeatherTech SportsCar Championship ===
Team	Based
Action Express Racing	Denver, North Carolina
Acura Meyer Shank Racing	Pataskala, Ohio
AO Racing	St. Charles, Illinois
Andrew Wojteczko Autosport	Caledon, Ontario
BMW M Team RLL	Zionsville, Indiana
Conquest Racing	Indianapolis, Indiana
CrowdStrike Racing by APR	Austin, Texas
DragonSpeed	Jupiter, Florida
DXDT Racing	Statesville, North Carolina
Era Motorsport	Westfield, Indiana
Forte Racing	Buttonwillow, California
Gradient Racing	Austin, Texas
JDC–Miller MotorSports	Savage, Minnesota
Korthoff Competition Motors	Newark, Ohio
Lone Star Racing	Mesa, Arizona
Magnus Racing	Tooele, Utah
Multimatic Motorsports	Markham, Ontario
Paul Miller Racing	Buford, Georgia
Pfaff Motorsports	Toronto, Ontario
Porsche Penske Motorsport	Mooresville, North Carolina
PR1/Mathiasen Motorsports	Fresno, California
Pratt Miller Motorsports	New Hudson, Michigan
Riley Technologies	Mooresville, North Carolina
The Heart of Racing	Seattle, Washington
Tower Motorsports	Riviera Beach, Florida
Triarsi Competizione	Orlando, Florida
Turner Motorsport	Newton, New Hampshire
United Autosports USA	Mooresville, North Carolina
Van der Steur Racing	Havre de Grace, Maryland
Vasser Sullivan Racing	Charlotte, North Carolina
Wayne Taylor Racing	Indianapolis, Indiana
Winward Racing	Houston, Texas
Wright Motorsports	Batavia, Ohio

== Rodeo ==
=== Professional Bull Riders Team Series ===
Team	Location	Venue
Arizona Ridge Riders	Glendale, Arizona	Desert Diamond Arena
Austin Gamblers	Austin, Texas	Moody Center
Carolina Cowboys	Greensboro, North Carolina	First Horizon Coliseum
Florida Freedom	Sunrise, Florida	Amerant Bank Arena
Kansas City Outlaws	Kansas City, Missouri	T-Mobile Center
Missouri Thunder	Ridgedale, Missouri	Thunder Ridge Nature Arena
Nashville Stampede	Nashville, Tennessee	Bridgestone Arena
New York Mavericks	Elmont, New York	UBS Arena
Oklahoma Wildcatters	Oklahoma City, Oklahoma	Paycom Center
Texas Rattlers	Fort Worth, Texas	Dickies Arena

== Rugby union ==
=== Major League Rugby ===
Major League Rugby is a men's rugby union league with six teams. As of its 2020 season, the average salary for a player was $10,000–$25,000.

Team	Location	Venue
California Legion	TBD	TBD
Chicago Hounds	Bridgeview, Illinois	SeatGeek Stadium
New England Free Jacks	Quincy, Massachusetts	Veterans Memorial Stadium
Old Glory DC	Fairfax, Virginia	George Mason Stadium
Seattle Seawolves	Tukwila, Washington	Starfire Stadium

== Soccer ==
=== Men's leagues ===
==== Major League Soccer ====
Major League Soccer (MLS) is in the first tier of the United States men's soccer league system. It currently consists of 30 teams: 27 in the United States and 3 in Canada. As of its 2024 season, the minimum salary is $89,716 for a regular player and $150,000 for a player subject to target allocation money. A maximum salary of $1,683,750 is enforced, though up to three "designated players" on each team can be paid salaries in excess of the maximum.

Conference	Team	Location	Venue
Eastern	Atlanta United FC	Atlanta, Georgia	Mercedes-Benz Stadium
Eastern	Charlotte FC	Charlotte, North Carolina	Bank of America Stadium
Eastern	Chicago Fire FC	Chicago, Illinois	Soldier Field (Note: Moving within Chicago to McDonald's Park in 2028.)
Eastern	FC Cincinnati	Cincinnati, Ohio	TQL Stadium
Eastern	Columbus Crew	Columbus, Ohio	ScottsMiracle-Gro Field
Eastern	D.C. United	Washington, D.C.	Audi Field
Eastern	Inter Miami CF	Miami, Florida	Nu Stadium
Eastern	CF Montréal	Montreal, Quebec	Saputo Stadium
Eastern	Nashville SC	Nashville, Tennessee	Geodis Park
Eastern	New England Revolution	Foxborough, Massachusetts	Gillette Stadium
Eastern	New York City FC	New York City, New York (Bronx)	Yankee Stadium (Note: Moving within New York City to Etihad Park in Queens in 2027.)
Eastern	New York Red Bulls	Harrison, New Jersey	Sports Illustrated Stadium
Eastern	Orlando City SC	Orlando, Florida	Inter.co Stadium
Eastern	Philadelphia Union	Chester, Pennsylvania	Subaru Park
Eastern	Toronto FC	Toronto, Ontario	BMO Field
Western	Austin FC	Austin, Texas	Q2 Stadium
Western	Colorado Rapids	Commerce City, Colorado	Dick's Sporting Goods Park
Western	FC Dallas	Frisco, Texas	Toyota Stadium
Western	Houston Dynamo FC	Houston, Texas	Shell Energy Stadium
Western	Sporting Kansas City	Kansas City, Kansas	Sporting Park
Western	LA Galaxy	Carson, California	Dignity Health Sports Park
Western	Los Angeles FC	Los Angeles, California	BMO Stadium
Western	Minnesota United FC	Saint Paul, Minnesota	Allianz Field
Western	Portland Timbers	Portland, Oregon	Providence Park
Western	Real Salt Lake	Sandy, Utah	America First Field
Western	San Diego FC	San Diego, California	Snapdragon Stadium
Western	San Jose Earthquakes	San Jose, California	PayPal Park
Western	Seattle Sounders FC	Seattle, Washington	Lumen Field
Western	St. Louis City SC	St. Louis, Missouri	Energizer Park
Western	Vancouver Whitecaps FC	Vancouver, British Columbia	BC Place

==== Canadian Premier League ====
The Canadian Premier League is the sole professional league atop the Canadian men's soccer league system. It currently consists of eight teams: five in Eastern Canada and three in Western Canada. As of its 2023 season, the minimum salary for a player was CA$30,000, and the maximum was ~CA$75,000.

Team	Location	Venue
Atlético Ottawa	Ottawa, Ontario	TD Place Stadium
Cavalry FC	Calgary, Alberta (Note: ATCO Field has a Calgary postal address but is located outside the city limits in Foothills County.)	ATCO Field
Forge FC	Hamilton, Ontario	Hamilton Stadium
HFX Wanderers FC	Halifax, Nova Scotia	Wanderers Grounds
Inter Toronto FC	Toronto, Ontario	York Lions Stadium
Pacific FC	Langford, British Columbia	Starlight Stadium
FC Supra du Québec	Laval, Quebec	Stade Boréale
Vancouver FC	Langley, British Columbia	Willoughby Stadium

==== USL Championship ====
The USL Championship is in the second tier of the United States men's soccer league system. It currently consists of 25 teams: eleven in the south, eight in the west, four in the northeast, and two in the midwest. As of its 2024 season, the minimum salary for players is $2,900 per month, though teams can pay up to six players a "flex contract" with a lower minimum salary of $2,400 per month. The minimum length of a player's contract with a USL Championship team is ten months.

Conference	Team	Location	Venue
Eastern	Birmingham Legion FC	Birmingham, Alabama	Protective Stadium
Eastern	Brooklyn FC	Brooklyn, New York	Maimonides Park
Eastern	Charleston Battery	Mount Pleasant, South Carolina	Patriots Point Soccer Complex
Eastern	Detroit City FC	Hamtramck, Michigan	Keyworth Stadium (Note: Planning to move to AlumniFi Field in Detroit in 2027.)
Eastern	Hartford Athletic	Hartford, Connecticut	Trinity Health Stadium
Eastern	Indy Eleven	Indianapolis, Indiana	Carroll Stadium
Eastern	Loudoun United FC	Leesburg, Virginia	Segra Field
Eastern	Louisville City FC	Louisville, Kentucky	Lynn Family Stadium
Eastern	Miami FC	Miami, Florida (Note: The stadium has a Miami mailing address but is located in unincorporated Miami-Dade County.)	Pitbull Stadium
Eastern	Pittsburgh Riverhounds SC	Pittsburgh, Pennsylvania	F.N.B. Stadium
Eastern	Rhode Island FC	Pawtucket, Rhode Island	Centreville Bank Stadium
Eastern	Sporting Club Jacksonville	Jacksonville, Florida	Hodges Stadium
Eastern	Tampa Bay Rowdies	St. Petersburg, Florida	Al Lang Stadium
Western	Colorado Springs Switchbacks FC	Colorado Springs, Colorado	Weidner Field
Western	El Paso Locomotive FC	El Paso, Texas	Southwest University Park
Western	FC Tulsa	Tulsa, Oklahoma	Oneok Field
Western	Las Vegas Lights FC	Las Vegas, Nevada	Cashman Field
Western	Lexington SC	Lexington, Kentucky	Lexington SC Stadium
Western	Monterey Bay FC	Seaside, California	Cardinale Stadium
Western	New Mexico United	Albuquerque, New Mexico	Rio Grande Credit Union Field
Western	Oakland Roots SC	Oakland, California	Oakland Coliseum
Western	Orange County SC	Irvine, California	Championship Soccer Stadium
Western	Phoenix Rising FC	Phoenix, Arizona	Phoenix Rising Soccer Stadium
Western	Sacramento Republic FC	Sacramento, California	Heart Health Park (Note: Planning to move within Sacramento to Republic FC Stadium in 2027.)
Western	San Antonio FC	San Antonio, Texas	Toyota Field
On hiatus
	OKC United (2028)	Oklahoma City, Oklahoma	Oklahoma City Stadium
Future teams
	Athletic Club Boise (2027)	Garden City, Idaho	Stadium at Expo Idaho
	Atlético Dallas (2027)	Dallas, Texas	Cotton Bowl
	Ozark United FC (2028)	Rogers, Arkansas	Ozark United Stadium
	Reno City FC (2028)	Reno, Nevada	Reno Soccer Stadium

==== MLS Next Pro ====
MLS Next Pro is in the third tier of the United States men's soccer league system. It currently consists of 30 teams: ten in the Southern United States, seven in the Western United States, six in the Midwestern United States, five in the Northeastern United States, and one each in Eastern and Western Canada. As of its 2024 season, the minimum salary for a player is $71,401.

Conference	Division	Team	Location	Venue
Eastern	Northeast	Columbus Crew 2	Columbus, Ohio	Historic Crew Stadium
Eastern	Northeast	CT United FC	New Haven, Connecticut	Reese Stadium
Eastern	Northeast	CT United FC	Storrs, Connecticut	Morrone Stadium
Eastern	Northeast	FC Cincinnati 2	Highland Heights, Kentucky	NKU Soccer Stadium
Eastern	Northeast	New England Revolution II	Foxboro, Massachusetts	Gillette Stadium
Eastern	Northeast	New York City FC II	Queens, New York	Belson Stadium
Eastern	Northeast	New York Red Bulls II	Montclair, New Jersey	MSU Soccer Park at Pittser Field
Eastern	Northeast	Philadelphia Union II	Chester, Pennsylvania	Subaru Park
Eastern	Northeast	Toronto FC II	Toronto, Ontario	York Lions Stadium
Eastern	Southeast	Atlanta United 2	Kennesaw, Georgia (Note: The stadium has a Kennesaw mailing address but is in unincorporated Cobb County.)	Fifth Third Stadium
Eastern	Southeast	Carolina Core FC	High Point, North Carolina	Truist Point
Eastern	Southeast	Chattanooga FC	Chattanooga, Tennessee	Finley Stadium
Eastern	Southeast	Chicago Fire FC II	Bridgeview, Illinois	SeatGeek Stadium
Eastern	Southeast	Crown Legacy FC	Matthews, North Carolina	Sportsplex at Matthews
Eastern	Southeast	Huntsville City FC	Huntsville, Alabama	Joe W. Davis Stadium
Eastern	Southeast	Inter Miami CF II	Fort Lauderdale, Florida	Chase Stadium
Eastern	Southeast	Orlando City B	Kissimmee, Florida	Osceola County Stadium
Western	Frontier	Austin FC II	Austin, Texas	Parmer Field
Western	Frontier	Colorado Rapids 2	Commerce City, Colorado	Dick's Sporting Goods Park
Western	Frontier	Colorado Rapids 2	Denver, Colorado	Denver Soccer Stadium
Western	Frontier	Houston Dynamo 2	Houston, Texas	SaberCats Stadium
Western	Frontier	Minnesota United FC 2	Blaine, Minnesota	National Sports Center
Western	Frontier	Minnesota United FC 2	Saint Paul, Minnesota	Allianz Field
Western	Frontier	North Texas SC	Mansfield, Texas	Mansfield Stadium
Western	Frontier	Sporting Kansas City II	Kansas City, Missouri	Swope Soccer Village
Western	Frontier	St. Louis City SC 2	St. Louis, Missouri	Energizer Park
Western	Pacific	Los Angeles FC 2	Fullerton, California	Titan Stadium
Western	Pacific	Portland Timbers2	Portland, Oregon	Providence Park
Western	Pacific	Real Monarchs	Herriman, Utah	Zions Bank Stadium
Western	Pacific	San Jose Earthquakes II	Moraga, California	Saint Mary's Stadium
Western	Pacific	Tacoma Defiance	Tukwila, Washington	Starfire Sports Complex
Western	Pacific	Ventura County FC	Thousand Oaks, California	William Rolland Stadium
Western	Pacific	Vancouver Whitecaps FC 2	Burnaby, British Columbia	Swangard Stadium
Future teams
		AC Grand Rapids (2027)	Grand Rapids, Michigan	Amway Stadium
		Forest City Cleveland (2027)	Cleveland, Ohio	South Gateway Stadium
		Jacksonville Armada FC (2027)	Jacksonville, Florida	New Eastside Stadium
		The Island F.C. (2027)	Uniondale, New York	Mitchel Athletic Complex

==== USL League One ====
USL League One is in the third tier of the United States men's soccer league system. It currently consists of 17 teams. As of its 2024 season, the minimum salary for a player is $2,100 per month, with no flex contracts à la the USL Championship being offered.

Team	Location	Venue
Athletic Club Boise	Garden City, Idaho	Stadium at Expo Idaho
AV Alta FC	Lancaster, California	Lancaster Municipal Stadium
Charlotte Independence	Charlotte, North Carolina	American Legion Memorial Stadium
Chattanooga Red Wolves SC	East Ridge, Tennessee	CHI Memorial Stadium
Corpus Christi FC	Corpus Christi, Texas	Corpus Christi Stadium
Fort Wayne FC	Fort Wayne, Indiana	Ruoff Mortgage Stadium
Forward Madison FC	Madison, Wisconsin	Breese Stevens Field
Greenville Triumph SC	Mauldin, South Carolina	GE Vernova Park
FC Naples	Naples, Florida	Paradise Coast Sports Complex Stadium
New York Cosmos	Paterson, New Jersey	Hinchliffe Stadium
One Knoxville SC	Knoxville, Tennessee	Covenant Health Park
Portland Hearts of Pine	Portland, Maine	Fitzpatrick Stadium
Richmond Kickers	Richmond, Virginia	City Stadium
Sarasota Paradise	Lakewood Ranch, Florida	Premier Sports Campus
Spokane Velocity	Spokane, Washington	ONE Spokane Stadium
Union Omaha	Omaha, Nebraska	Morrison Stadium
Westchester SC	Mount Vernon, New York	The Stadium at Memorial Field
On hiatus
South Georgia Tormenta FC (TBD)	Statesboro, Georgia	Tormenta Stadium
Future teams
Fort Lauderdale United FC (2027)	Fort Lauderdale, Florida	Beyond Bancard Field
Port St. Lucie SC (2027)	Port St. Lucie, Florida	Walton & One Stadium
Sporting Cascades FC (2027)	Eugene, Oregon	Civic Park
Thousand Oaks Pro Soccer (2027)	Thousand Oaks, California	TBD
Rodeo SC (2028)	Celina, Texas	Bobcat Stadium
USL Long Island (2028)	Hempstead, New York	James M. Shuart Stadium

==== Major Arena Soccer League ====
The Major Arena Soccer League is a men's indoor soccer league with ten teams. As of its 2021–22 season, the average salary of a player was $1,500–$3,500 per month.

Team	Location	Venue
Baltimore Blast	Towson, Maryland	TU Arena
Empire Strykers	Ontario, California	Toyota Arena
Kansas City Comets	Independence, Missouri	Cable Dahmer Arena
Lehigh Valley Spirits	Allentown, Pennsylvania	PPL Center
Milwaukee Wave	Milwaukee, Wisconsin	UW–Milwaukee Panther Arena
San Diego Sockers	Oceanside, California	Frontwave Arena
St. Louis Ambush	St. Charles, Missouri	Family Arena
Tacoma Stars	Kent, Washington	accesso ShoWare Center
Utica City FC	Utica, New York	NBT Bank Arena at the Utica Memorial Auditorium
Future teams
MASL Sacramento (2027)	Rancho Cordova, California	Dova Arena

=== Women's leagues ===
==== National Women's Soccer League ====
The National Women's Soccer League is in the first tier of the United States women's soccer league system. It currently consists of sixteen teams: seven in the west, five in the south, two in the midwest, and two in the northeast. As of its 2023 season, the minimum salary for a player was $36,400, while the maximum salary was $200,000, though allocation money can be used to pay player salaries in excess of the maximum.

Team	Location	Venue
Angel City FC	Los Angeles, California	BMO Stadium
Bay FC	San Jose, California	PayPal Park
Boston Legacy FC	Foxboro, Massachusetts	Gillette Stadium (Note: Temporary stadium; permanent home of White Stadium in Boston planned to reopen after renovations in 2028.)
Boston Legacy FC	Pawtucket, Rhode Island	Centreville Bank Stadium (Note: Temporary stadium used for some games in 2026 and for all home games in 2027.)
Chicago Stars FC	Evanston, Illinois	Northwestern Medicine Field at Martin Stadium
Denver Summit FC	Centennial, Colorado	Centennial Stadium (Note: Temporary stadium; permanent home in Denver, as yet unnamed, planned to open in 2028.)
Gotham FC	Harrison, New Jersey	Sports Illustrated Stadium
Houston Dash	Houston, Texas	Shell Energy Stadium
Kansas City Current	Kansas City, Missouri	CPKC Stadium
North Carolina Courage	Cary, North Carolina	WakeMed Soccer Park
Orlando Pride	Orlando, Florida	Inter.co Stadium
Portland Thorns FC	Portland, Oregon	Providence Park
Racing Louisville FC	Louisville, Kentucky	Lynn Family Stadium
San Diego Wave FC	San Diego, California	Snapdragon Stadium
Seattle Reign FC	Seattle, Washington	Lumen Field
Utah Royals	Sandy, Utah	America First Field
Washington Spirit	Washington, D.C.	Audi Field
Future teams
Atlanta City FC (2028)	Atlanta, Georgia	Mercedes-Benz Stadium
Columbus NWSL team (2028)	Columbus, Ohio	ScottsMiracle-Gro Field

==== USL Super League ====
The USL Super League is in the first tier of the United States women's soccer league system. It currently consists of eight teams, with a number of teams planned in the coming seasons. As of its 2024–25 season, salaries for players are to be "competitive" with those of the National Women's Soccer League (NWSL), and no maximum salary will be enforced.

Team	Location	Venue
Brooklyn FC	Brooklyn, New York	Maimonides Park
Carolina Ascent FC	Charlotte, North Carolina	American Legion Memorial Stadium
Dallas Trinity FC	Dallas, Texas	Cotton Bowl
DC Power FC	Washington, D.C.	Audi Field
Fort Lauderdale United FC	Fort Lauderdale, Florida	Beyond Bancard Field
Lexington SC	Lexington, Kentucky	Lexington SC Stadium
Sporting Club Jacksonville	Jacksonville, Florida	Hodges Stadium
Tampa Bay Sun FC	Tampa, Florida	Suncoast Credit Union Field
Future teams
New York Cosmos (2027)	Paterson, New Jersey	Hinchliffe Stadium
Ozark United FC (2027)	Rogers, Arkansas	Ozark United Stadium
Athletic Club Boise (TBD)	Garden City, Idaho	Stadium at Expo Idaho
Buffalo Pro Soccer (TBD)	Buffalo, New York	TBD
Chattanooga Red Wolves SC (TBD)	East Ridge, Tennessee	CHI Memorial Stadium
Indy Eleven (TBD)	Indianapolis, Indiana	Eleven Park
Oakland Soul SC (TBD)	Oakland, California	Oakland Coliseum
Rally Madison FC (TBD)	Madison, Wisconsin	Breese Stevens Field

==== Northern Super League ====
The Northern Super League is the sole professional league atop the Canadian women's soccer league system. For the 2026 season, the league consisted of six teams, and will expand to seven teams for the 2027 season. As of its 2025 season, the minimum salary for a player was CA$50,000, with each team allowed one "marquee player" for whom only CA$75,000 of their salary counted towards a team's total salary cap of CA$1.5 million. Franchises were allowed up to seven foreign players.

Team	Location	Venue
Calgary Wild FC	Calgary, Alberta	McMahon Stadium
Halifax Tides FC	Halifax, Nova Scotia	Wanderers Grounds
Montreal Roses FC	Laval, Quebec	Stade Boreale
Ottawa Rapid FC	Ottawa, Ontario	TD Place Stadium
AFC Toronto	Toronto, Ontario	York Lions Stadium
Vancouver Rise FC	Burnaby, British Columbia	Swangard Stadium
Winnipeg Ember FC	Winnipeg, Manitoba	Ralph Cantafio Soccer Complex

==== NWSL Division 2 ====
NWSL Division 2, planned to launch in 2027, is in the second tier of the United States women's soccer league system. Its first season is expected to feature eight teams, all affiliated with current NWSL sides: four in the south, two in the west, and one each in the midwest and northeast. Player compensation is yet to be publicly announced.

Team	Location	Venue
Bay FC	San Jose, California	PayPal Park
Gotham FC	Harrison, New Jersey	Sports Illustrated Stadium
Kansas City Current II	Riverside, Missouri	Riverside Stadium
North Carolina Courage	Cary, North Carolina	WakeMed Soccer Park
Orlando Pride	Orlando, Florida	Inter.co Stadium
Racing Louisville FC	Louisville, Kentucky	Lynn Family Stadium
Seattle Reign FC	Seattle, Washington	Lumen Field
Washington Spirit	Washington, D.C.	Audi Field

==== WPSL PRO ====
WPSL PRO, also planned to start play in 2027, is in the second tier of the United States women's soccer league system. It currently consists of fourteen teams: six in the south, and four each in the midwest and west. Player compensation is yet to be publicly announced.

Team	Location	Venue
AC Houston Sur	Houston, Texas	The Village School
Austin Rise FC	Austin, Texas	House Park
Dakota Fusion FC	Moorhead, Minnesota	Jim Gotta Stadium
FC Wichita	Wichita, Kansas	Stryker Soccer Stadium
Georgia Impact	Canton, Georgia	Tommy Baker Field
Indios Denver FC	Thornton, Colorado	Pinnacle Athletic Complex
Northern Colorado Rain FC	Windsor, Colorado	TicketSocket Park
Oklahoma City FC	Mustang, Oklahoma	Mustang Soccer Stadium
Real Central New Jersey	Lawrence Township, New Jersey	Ben Cohen Field
Sioux Falls City FC	Sioux Falls, South Dakota	Bob Young Field
SoCal WPSL Pro	Southern California	TBD
Soda City FC	Columbia, South Carolina	W.C. Hawkings Stadium
SouthStar FC	Addison, Texas	Mean Green Soccer Stadium
The Town FC	Moraga, California	Saint Mary's Stadium
Future teams
Cleveland Astra (2028)	Cleveland, Ohio	South Gateway Stadium

== Softball ==
=== Athletes Unlimited Softball League ===
The Athletes Unlimited Softball League is a women's fastpitch softball league with six teams. As of its 2025 season, the average salary for a player will be $40,000–45,000, with salaries up to $75,000 achievable through bonus payments.

Team	Location	Venue
Carolina Blaze	Durham, North Carolina	Smith Family Stadium
Chicago Bandits	Rosemont, Illinois	Parkway Bank Sports Complex
Oklahoma City Spark	Oklahoma City, Oklahoma	Tom Heath Field
Portland Cascade	Hillsboro, Oregon	Hillsboro Ballpark
Texas Volts	Round Rock, Texas	Dell Diamond
Utah Talons	Salt Lake City, Utah	Dumke Family Softball Stadium

== Ultimate ==
=== Ultimate Frisbee Association ===
Conference	Team	Location	Venue
East	Boston Glory	Boston, Massachusetts	Hormel Stadium
East	DC Breeze	Washington, D.C.	Carlini Field
East	Montreal Royal	Montreal, Quebec	Complexe sportif Claude-Robillard
East	New York Empire	Mount Vernon, New York	The Stadium at Memorial Field
East	Philadelphia Phoenix	Aston, Pennsylvania	Neumann University
East	Toronto Rush	Toronto, Ontario	Varsity Stadium
Central	Chicago Union	Evanston, Illinois	Martin Stadium
Central	Indianapolis AlleyCats	Indianapolis, Indiana	Kuntz Memorial Soccer Stadium
Central	Madison Radicals	Madison, Wisconsin	Breese Stevens Field
Central	Minnesota Wind Chill	Saint Paul, Minnesota	Sea Foam Stadium
Central	Pittsburgh Thunderbirds	Pittsburgh, Pennsylvania	Highmark Stadium
South	Atlanta Hustle	Atlanta, Georgia (Note: Silverbacks Park has an Atlanta mailing address but is in unincorporated DeKalb County.)	Atlanta Silverbacks Park
South	Austin Sol	Austin, Texas	Westlake Chaparral Stadium
South	Carolina Flyers	Durham, North Carolina	Durham County Memorial Stadium
South	Houston Havoc	Houston, Texas	SaberCats Stadium
South	San Diego Growlers	San Diego, California	Mission Bay High School
South	Vegas Bighorns	Las Vegas, Nevada	Bengals Stadium
West	Colorado Apex	Denver, Colorado	Marv Kay Stadium
West	Oakland Spiders	Oakland, California	Tiger Stadium
West	Oregon Steel	Portland, Oregon	Hilken Community Stadium
West	Salt Lake Shred	Herriman, Utah	Zions Bank Stadium
West	Seattle Cascades	Seattle, Washington	Seattle Memorial Stadium

=== Premier Ultimate League ===
The Premier Ultimate League (PUL) is a women's professional ultimate league in the United States.

Conference	Team	Location	Venue
North	Indianapolis Red	Indianapolis, Indiana	Brebeuf Stadium
North	Milwaukee Monarchs	Madison, Wisconsin	Breese Stevens Field
North	Milwaukee Monarchs	Milwaukee, Wisconsin	MSOE Viets Field
North	Milwaukee Monarchs	Wauwatosa, Wisconsin	Hart Park
North	Minnesota Strike	Saint Paul, Minnesota	Sea Foam Stadium
North	New York Gridlock	New Rochelle, New York	Joseph F. Fosina Field
North	New York Gridlock	Paterson, New Jersey	Hinchliffe Stadium
North	Philadelphia Surge	Conshohocken, Pennsylvania	Garthwaite Stadium
North	Philadelphia Surge	Philadelphia, Pennsylvania	South Philadelphia Supersite
South	Atlanta Soul	Decatur, Georgia	Gellerstedt Field
South	Austin Torch	Austin, Texas	Gamblin Field
South	DC Shadow	Washington, D.C.	Carlini Field
South	Nashville Nightshade	Knoxville, Tennessee	West High School
South	Nashville Nightshade	Nashville, Tennessee	James Lawson High School
South	Raleigh Radiance	Durham, North Carolina	Carolina Friends School
South	Raleigh Radiance	Durham, North Carolina	Durham County Memorial Stadium

=== Western Ultimate League ===
The Western Ultimate League (WUL) is a women's professional ultimate league in the Western United States.

Conference	Team	Location	Venue
Northwest
Northwest	Colorado Alpenglow	Thornton, Colorado	Pinnacle Athletic Complex
Northwest	Oregon Soar	Portland, Oregon	UO Portland Stadium
Northwest	Seattle Tempest	Seattle, Washington	Interbay Stadium
Northwest	Utah Wild	Herriman, Utah	Zions Bank Stadium
Northwest	Utah Wild	Salt Lake City, Utah	Judge Memorial Catholic High School
Northwest	Utah Wild	Salt Lake City, Utah	West High School
Southwest	Arizona Sidewinders	Gilbert, Arizona	Perry High School
Southwest	Arizona Sidewinders	Tempe, Arizona	Tempe High School
Southwest	Bay Area Falcons	Oakland, California	Fremont High School
Southwest	Los Angeles Astra	Burbank, California	John Burroughs High School
Southwest	San Diego Super Bloom	San Diego, California	Clairemont High School
Southwest	San Diego Super Bloom	San Diego, California	Mission Bay High School

== Volleyball ==
=== LOVB Pro ===
LOVB Pro is a women's indoor volleyball league with ten teams As of its 2025 season, the minimum salary for a player is $60,000, with the league covering the cost of housing and transportation, providing players with a 401(k) plan, health insurance, and offering maternity and parental leave.

Conference	Team	Location	Venue
Eastern
Eastern	LOVB Atlanta	College Park, Georgia	Gateway Center Arena
Eastern	LOVB Madison	Madison, Wisconsin	Alliant Energy Center
Eastern	LOVB Miami	Coral Gables, Florida	Watsco Center
Eastern	LOVB Minnesota	Minneapolis, Minnesota	Maturi Pavilion
Eastern	LOVB Nebraska	Grand Island, Nebraska	BigIron Events Center
Eastern	LOVB Nebraska	Lincoln, Nebraska	Bob Devaney Sports Center
Eastern	LOVB Nebraska	Omaha, Nebraska	Baxter Arena
Western
Western	LOVB Austin	Cedar Park, Texas	H-E-B Center at Cedar Park
Western	LOVB Austin	San Antonio, Texas	Frost Bank Center
Western	LOVB Houston	Cypress, Texas	Berry Center
Western	Los Angeles Orbit	Inglewood, California	Intuit Dome
Western	LOVB Salt Lake	Provo, Utah	BYU Smith Fieldhouse
Western	LOVB Salt Lake	Taylorsville, Utah	Lifetime Activities Center
Western	San Francisco Signal	San Francisco, California	Bill Graham Civic Auditorium

=== Major League Volleyball ===
Major League Volleyball is a women's indoor volleyball league with twelve teams. As of its 2025 season, the minimum salary for a player is $60,000, with the league offering each player "benefits" worth $10,000, and an undisclosed amount of revenue sharing with their respective teams. Two players on each team are also paid an additional $40,000 to serve as the team's ambassadors.

Conference	Team	Location	Venue
Eastern
Eastern	Atlanta Vibe	Duluth, Georgia	Gas South Arena
Eastern	Columbus Fury	Columbus, Ohio	Nationwide Arena
Eastern	DC Flight	Washington, D.C.	The Anthem
Eastern	Grand Rapids Rise	Grand Rapids, Michigan	Van Andel Arena
Eastern	Indy Ignite	Fishers, Indiana	Fishers Event Center
Eastern	Orlando Valkyries	Orlando, Florida (Note: The arena has an Orlando mailing address but is in unincorporated Orange County.)	Addition Financial Arena
Western
Western	Dallas Pulse	Frisco, Texas	Comerica Center
Western	Minnesota Forge	St. Paul, Minnesota	Grand Casino Arena
Western	Los Angeles Thunder	Anaheim, California	Honda Center
Western	Los Angeles Thunder	Los Angeles, California	Crypto.com Arena
Western	NorCal Rumble	San Jose, California	Tech CU Arena
Western	Omaha Supernovas	Omaha, Nebraska	CHI Health Center Omaha
Western	Vegas Thrill	Henderson, Nevada	Lee's Family Forum

== See also ==
- Professional sports leagues in the United States
- Major professional sports leagues in the United States and Canada
- Major professional sports teams in the United States and Canada
- List of American and Canadian cities by number of major professional sports teams
- List of professional sports teams in Canada by city
- Prominent women's sports leagues in the United States and Canada
- List of top-level minor league sports teams in the United States by metropolitan area
- List of soccer clubs in the United States by city
