= List of professional sports teams in Wisconsin =

Wisconsin is the 20th most populated state in the United States.

== Active teams ==
=== Major league teams ===
Wisconsin is home to three major professional sports teams. Two of the teams play in Milwaukee and one plays in Green Bay.

American football
| League | Team | City | Stadium | Capacity |
| NFL | Green Bay Packers | Green Bay | Lambeau Field | 81,441 |
Baseball
| League | Team | City | Stadium | Capacity |
| MLB | Milwaukee Brewers | Milwaukee | American Family Field | 41,900 |
Basketball
| League | Team | City | Arena | Capacity |
| NBA | Milwaukee Bucks | Milwaukee | Fiserv Forum | 17,385 |

=== Other professional sports teams ===
==== Men's leagues ====
Arena football
| League | Team | City | Arena | Capacity |
| IFL | Green Bay Blizzard | Ashwaubenon | Resch Center | 8,600 |
Baseball
| League | Team | City | Stadium | Capacity |
| MWL (High-A) | Beloit Sky Carp | Beloit | ABC Supply Stadium | 3,850 |
| MWL (High-A) | Wisconsin Timber Rattlers | Appleton | Neuroscience Group Field at Fox Cities Stadium | 5,900 |
| AAPB (Ind.) | Lake Country DockHounds | Oconomowoc | Wisconsin Brewing Company Park | 3,641 |
| AAPB (Ind.) | Milwaukee Milkmen | Franklin | Franklin Field | 4,000 |
Basketball
| League | Team | City | Arena | Capacity |
| G-League | Wisconsin Herd | Oshkosh | Oshkosh Arena | 3,500 |
Ice hockey
| League | Team | City | Arena | Capacity |
| AHL | Milwaukee Admirals | Milwaukee | UW–Milwaukee Panther Arena | 9,652 |
Indoor soccer
| League | Team | City | Arena | Capacity |
| MASL | Milwaukee Wave | Milwaukee | UW–Milwaukee Panther Arena | 9,500 |
Soccer
| League | Team | City | Stadium | Capacity |
| USL1 | Forward Madison FC | Madison | Breese Stevens Field | 5,000 |
Ultimate
| League | Team | City | Stadium | Capacity |
| UFA | Madison Radicals | Madison | Breese Stevens Field | 5,000 |

==== Women's leagues ====
Ultimate
| League | Team | City | Stadium | Capacity |
| PUL | Milwaukee Monarchs | Madison | Breese Stevens Field | 5,000 |
| PUL | Milwaukee Monarchs | Milwaukee | MSOE Viets Field | 600 |
| PUL | Milwaukee Monarchs | Wauwatosa | Hart Park | 4,900 |
Volleyball
| League | Team | City | Arena | Capacity |
| LOVB | LOVB Madison | Madison | Alliant Energy Center | 10,231 |
| LOVB | LOVB Madison | Madison | Wisconsin Field House | 7,540 |

=== Map of cities with a professional sports team ===
Location with a major professional sports team
Location with a professional sports team

== See also ==
- Sports in Wisconsin
