= Atlanta Soul =

Professional women's ultimate frisbee team in Atlanta

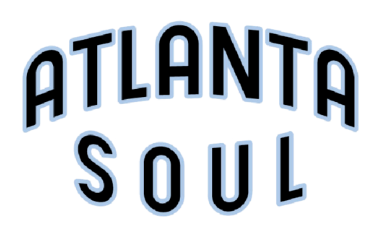
- Sport: Ultimate frisbee
- Founded: 2018
- League: Premier Ultimate League
- Based in: Atlanta, Georgia
- Head coaches: Aileen Thomas, Meredith Leahy
- Website: atlantasoulultimate.com

The Atlanta Soul are a professional women's ultimate team based in Atlanta that competes in the Premier Ultimate League (PUL). The team joined the PUL for the league's inaugural 2019 season. The team is also noteworthy for their sponsorship of the Color of Ultimate: ATL game, the first Color of Ultimate showcase game.

== Franchise history ==
The Atlanta Soul formed in 2018 for a series of women's professional games featuring matches between teams from Indianapolis (Red), Detroit (Riveters), Nashville (Nightshade), Raleigh (Radiance), and Austin (Torch). The Medellin Revolution also played one game in this series. Most of these teams, including the Atlanta Soul, went on to become founding members of the PUL.

The Soul is one of the original eight teams in the Premier Ultimate League, which had its inaugural season in 2019. The Soul is co-owned by Angela Lin and Maddy Frey.

The team would have played its second season in 2020, but the PUL cancelled the season due to the COVID-19 pandemic.

In response to the COVID-19 pandemic, the PUL elected to hold a limited 2021 competition season with games occurring across three weekends in August 2021, but the Soul opted not to compete.

== Record ==
In their 2019 regular season, the Soul defeated the Austin Torch 19-15 and the Nashville Nightshade 23–16. They fell to the Medellin Revolution 20-30 and 17–24, and to the NY Gridlock 19–21. In the playoffs semifinal game, the Soul fell to the Medellin Revolution in a tightly contested double-overtime rematch, 26–27.

| Year | Reg. season | Playoffs | Finish |
|---|---|---|---|
| 2019 | 2-3 (5th) | 0-1 | Lost in Semifinals |
| 2020 | Season cancelled | 0-0 | Season cancelled |
| 2021 | Did not compete | n/a | Did not compete |
| Total | 2-3 | 0-1 | |

== Current coaching staff ==
- Coach - Aileen Thomas
- Coach - Meredith Leahy

== Roster ==
The team's 2020 roster was as follows:

| 2020 Atlanta Soul | | | | |
| # | Name | Pronouns | College | Most Recent Club Team |
| | Alex Fairley | | University of Georgia | Atlanta Ozone |
| 3 | Caroline Taylor* | | | Atlanta Bucket |
| | Cate Yackey | | | Asheville Superlame |
| | Chupzi Lema | | Georgia Tech | Atlanta Bucket |
| | Claire Bidigare-Curtis | | Belmont University | |
| | Courtney Testa | | University of Florida | |
| | Ellie Daniels | | | Madison Heist |
| 52 | Erynn Schroeder | | College of St. Benedict | Atlanta Ozone |
| 8 | India Stubbs | | Harvard University | Atlanta Ozone |
| 24 | Kate Travaglini | | University of Florida | Florida Tabby Rosa |
| 30 | Katherine Yost | | Georgia College | Atlanta Bucket |
| | Katie Gainer | | Georgia State University | Atlanta Bucket |
| | Kat Smith | | | |
| | Lanie O'Neill | | Clemson University | Triangle Area Warhawks |
| | Larissa Ferreira | | Florida State University | Florida Fiasco |
| 41 | Leah Tsinajinnie | | Georgia Tech | Atlanta Ozone |
| | Lily Ponitz | | | Atlanta Ozone |
| 00 | Lisa Fitton | | Florida State University | Florida Weird |
| 2 | Liz Leon | | Bowdoin College | |
| | Maddie Boyd | | Auburn University | Atlanta Ozone |
| | Mary Virginia Rockwell | | University of Georgia | Athens (GA) Murmur |
| | Meg Harris | | | Atlanta Ozone |
| | Melanie Lindsey | | University of Tennessee | |
| | Merideth Byl | | Auburn University | |
| 27 | Mo McCamley* | | | Atlanta Ozone |
| 49 | Robyn Fennig* | | University of Wisconsin-Eau Claire, University of Iowa | Washington D.C. Scandal |
| 44 | Sam Hill | | | Atlanta Bucket |

*captain

== Color of Ultimate ==
The Soul, along with the Atlanta Hustle, sponsored and supported the first Color of Ultimate game, held in Atlanta on June 22, 2019. The Color of Ultimate showcase games are a project of the Atlanta Flying Disc Club (AFDC) Project Diversity initiative aimed at raising the profiles of elite ultimate players of color from around the world.
