= Columbus Pride (ultimate) =

Women's ultimate team in Columbus, Ohio

- Sport: Ultimate
- Founded: 2019
- League: Premier Ultimate League
- Based in: Columbus, Ohio
- Head coach: Joseph Marmerstein
- Website: columbusprideultimate.com

The Columbus Pride is a professional women's ultimate team based in Columbus, Ohio which competes in the Premier Ultimate League (PUL). The team joined the PUL for the league's inaugural 2019 season. Their stated mission is to "increase the visibility of elite female ultimate players in Columbus and surrounding areas, provide role models to young athletes, and compete at a high, spirited level."

== Franchise history ==
The Pride formed in early 2019, and is one of the original eight teams in the Premier Ultimate League.

The team would have played its second season in 2020 and held tryouts in early 2020, but the PUL cancelled the season due to the COVID-19 pandemic.

In 2021, the Pride competed at the Midwest weekend of the PUL's abbreviated competition season, placing second. They fell in overtime to the Milwaukee Monarchs and defeated the Indianapolis Red.

== Record ==
Going into the 2019 season, Ultiworld's power rankings placed the Pride at 6th in the league. In their 2019 regular season, the Pride defeated the Nashville Nightshade 24-13 and the Indianapolis Red 15–12. They fell to the NY Gridlock 10–17, the Medellin Revolution 16–18, and the Raleigh Radiance 13–20. This record gave them a sixth-place finish in the league, which did not qualify them for the playoffs.

In 2021, the Pride lost to the Milwaukee Monarchs 11-12 and defeated the Indianapolis Red 21–7.

The Pride will compete in the PUL's 2022 season, which runs from April through June 2022.

Year	Reg. season	Playoffs	Finish
2019	2-3 (6th)	0-0	6th
2020	Season Cancelled	0-0	Season Cancelled
2021	1-1	n/a	2nd in Midwest
Total	3-4	0-0	

== Current coaching staff ==
- Head coach: Joseph Marmerstein
- Assistant coach: Alaine Wetli
- Founder: Mary Turner
- Founder: Sadie Jezierski
- Founder: Corinn "Champ" Pruitt

== Roster ==
The team's 2020 roster was as follows:

2020 Columbus Pride				
#	Name	Pronouns	College	Most Recent Club Team
2	Libby Lehman		Case Western Reserve University	Columbus Rival
3	Domenica Sutherland		University of Texas	Texas Showdown
4	Emily Barrett		Ohio State University	Columbus Cocktails
5	Paige Soper		Ohio State University	Columbus Rival
6	Corinn Pruitt		Ohio State University	Columbus Rival
7	Lucy Bender		Allegheny College; University of Pittsburgh	Columbus Rival
8	Lilly Mendoza		Cornell University	Columbus Rival
9	Janine Walker		Ohio State University	Columbus Rival
10	Cara Sieber		Ohio State University	Columbus Cocktails
11	Sadie Jezierski		Ohio State University	Nashville 'Shine
14	Kristen Cherosky		Ohio State University	Columbus Rival
16	Lucia Wei		Case Western Reserve University	EDM (Denver)
17	Caitlin Duffner		Ohio State University	Columbus Cocktails
19	Iris Javersak		University of Akron	Columbus Rival
20	Charlotte Koerner		West Virginia University	Pittsburgh Alloy
22	Mary Turner		Ohio State University	Nashville 'Shine
23	Lauren Boyle			Washington DC Scandal
24	Stevie Miller		Ohio State University	Columbus Rival
26	Chelsea Zhu		Williams College	Notorious C.L.E.
29	Emmy Schroder		Ohio State University	Columbus Rival
31	Sharon Yee		Case Western Reserve University	Columbus Rival
39	Sara Scott		University of Wisconsin	Columbus Rival
47	Penny Wu			Hybrid (Ann Arbor)
78	Tiffany Lim		Ohio State University	Petey's Pirates (Columbus)
87	Molly Moore		University of Pittsburgh	Washington DC Scandal
95	Kristen Behrens		Ohio State University	Petey's Pirates (Columbus)
00	Eileen Duffner		Washington University in St. Louis	Chicago Nemesis
