= Western Ultimate League =

Professional ultimate league

- Sport: Ultimate
- Founded: 2020
- First season: 2022
- No. of teams: 8
- Country: United States
- Most recent champion: Seattle Tempest
- Most titles: Seattle Tempest (3)
- Website: westernultimateleague.com

The Western Ultimate League (WUL) is a women's professional ultimate league in the Western United States. It was founded in 2020. The WUL's stated mission is to "promote visibility, opportunity, and equity within women's ultimate".

The WUL was formed to parallel the Premier Ultimate League (PUL), another women's ultimate league established in 2019, with an eye toward a future merger. The WUL was established to provide professional opportunities for women and non-binary athletes in the Western United States, building on the success of showcase games that began in 2019 along the West Coast. The league is committed to creating equitable and accessible pathways for participation while showcasing the abilities of women and non-binary players through professional-level games that are broadcast globally. The WUL also focuses on developing future generations of players through clinics and community outreach programs.

== History ==
The WUL started with a 2017 and 2018 series of women's and mixed showcase games affiliated with the American Ultimate Disc League (now the Ultimate Frisbee Association), and a 2019 series of professional women's showcase games along the west coast including games between Seattle, Portland, and Vancouver-based teams and between Los Angeles and San Diego–based teams.

The inaugural 2020 Western Ultimate League season began with tryouts in January and February 2020 with seven teams. Competition, which had been set to begin in March 2020 and continue through May, was postponed and then canceled due to the COVID-19 pandemic.

In January 2021, the Portland Swifts announced they were withdrawing from the WUL. The six remaining WUL teams first competed in December 2021 at the Winter Cup in San Diego. The Utah Wild emerged victorious, and two plays from the Winter Cup were featured on SportsCenter. After the Winter Cup, the league announced the addition of a seventh team, the Oregon Onyx.

The first regular season was conducted in 2022, with the Seattle Tempest emerging as champions. In October 2022, the league announced the addition of an eighth team, the Colorado Alpenglow, and in March 2023 they announced the creation of two conferences, Northwest and Southwest.

The Oregon Onyx and Los Angeles Astra departed the league after the 2023 season.

The Oregon Soar joined the league after the 2024 season.

With the addition of the Oregon Soar for the 2025 season, the league restructured its format from the two-conference system that had been in place since 2023. The league moved away from the Northwest and Southwest conferences, which had previously consisted of three teams each following the departure of the Los Angeles Astra and Oregon Onyx after the 2023 season, to operate as a single seven-team table for the 2025 season.

In 2025 the first WUL vs PUL All-Star Game took place. The Los Angeles Astra returned to the league after the 2025 season.

== Teams ==
The WUL consists of seven teams as of the 2025 season.

WUL team locations

Team	Location	First season	Team colors
Arizona Sidewinders	Gilbert, AZ	2021	
Bay Area Falcons	Oakland, CA	2021	
Los Angeles Astra	Burbank, CA	2021	
Colorado Alpenglow	Thornton, CO	2023	
Oregon Soar	Portland, OR	2025	
San Diego Super Bloom	San Diego, CA	2021	
Seattle Tempest	Seattle, WA	2021	
Utah Wild	Salt Lake City, UT	2021	

=== Former teams ===
Team	Location	First season	Last season
Oregon Onyx	Portland, OR	2022	2023

== Champions ==
WUL champions
Season	Date	Champion	Final score	Runner-up	Venue	Location
2022	May 15, 2022	Seattle Tempest	18-15	San Diego Super Bloom	Mira Mesa Senior High School	San Diego, CA
2023	June 4, 2023	Seattle Tempest	13-11	San Diego Super Bloom	Memorial Stadium	Seattle, WA
2024	June 2, 2024	Colorado Alpenglow	20-12	Utah Wild	Pinnacle Athletic Complex	Thornton, CO
2025	June 8, 2025	San Diego Super Bloom	12-10	Bay Area Falcons	Fremont High School	Oakland, CA
2026	June 14, 2026	Seattle Tempest	21-11	San Diego Super Bloom	UO Portland Campus	Portland, OR

=== Championship Weekend ===
The WUL Championship Weekend is the annual postseason tournament that determines the league champion. The event features the top four teams from the regular season competing in a single-elimination bracket over two days.

Format

After a 9-week regular season, the four highest-ranked teams qualify for Championship Weekend. The tournament uses a standard four-team bracket:

- Saturday: Two semifinal games (1 vs 4 seed, 2 vs 3 seed)
- Sunday: Third place game (semifinal losers) and championship final (semifinal winners)

Tournament history

Championship Weekend rotates host cities annually. San Diego hosted the inaugural event in 2022, followed by Seattle (2023), Colorado (2024), and the Bay Area (2025). The host region's team has won the championship in 2023 and 2024.

==== 2022 ====
The 2022 WUL season marked the league's first full inaugural season, featuring seven teams competing across the Western United States. The regular season ran from March 11th to May 1st using a hybrid format of traditional home-and-away games combined with special weekend events.

The top four teams advanced to Championship Weekend on May 14-15 at Mira Mesa High School in San Diego, California. The Seattle Tempest emerged as the league's first champions, completing a perfect season by winning every game including a victory over the San Diego Super Bloom in the finals. Seattle's dominant inaugural campaign established them as the WUL's first dynasty.

Semifinals; Saturday, May 14
1	Seattle Tempest	24
4	Arizona Sidewinders	12
2	San Diego Super Bloom	24
3	Oregon Onyx	15

Finals; Sunday, May 15
1	Seattle Tempest	18
2	San Diego Super Bloom	15
Third place
4	Arizona Sidewinders	17
3	Oregon Onyx	14

==== 2023 ====
The 2023 WUL season marked a major expansion as the league welcomed the Colorado Alpenglow as its eighth franchise and split into two four-team conferences for the first time. The Northwest Conference featured Colorado, Oregon, Seattle, and Utah, while the Southwest Conference included Arizona, Los Angeles, San Diego, and San Francisco. The season utilized a hybrid format mixing traditional home-and-away games with special weekend events over 10 weeks from March 10th to May 14th.

Despite losing twice during the regular season, the Seattle Tempest dominated the Northwest Conference and successfully defended their championship at home in Seattle. Championship Weekend on June 3-4 saw Seattle defeat San Francisco 13-7 in the semifinals before edging San Diego Super Bloom 13-11 in a thrilling final—marking Seattle's second consecutive title and their second championship game victory over San Diego.

Semifinals; Saturday, June 3
SW1	San Diego Super Bloom	21
NW2	Utah Wild	15
NW1	Seattle Tempest	13
SW2	Bay Area Falcons	7

Championship; Sunday, June 4
SW1	San Diego Super Bloom	11
NW1	Seattle Tempest	13
Third place
NW2	Utah Wild	10
SW2	Bay Area Falcons	14

==== 2024 ====
The 2024 WUL season marked a return to traditional home and away games with a streamlined six-team format. The league was divided into two three-team conferences: the Northwest Conference (Colorado, Seattle, Utah) and Southwest Conference (Arizona, Bay Area, San Diego). Each team played every in-conference opponent twice and faced two out-of-conference teams during the 9-week regular season from March 13th to May 19th.

The season culminated in Championship Weekend on June 1-2 at the Pinnacle Athletic Complex in Thornton, Colorado. In a major upset, two-time champions Seattle Tempest failed to qualify for Championship Weekend, while two teams that had never won a semifinal match advanced to the Championship Game. The Colorado Alpenglow, in just their second season, defeated the Utah Wild 20-12 in the finals to claim their first WUL championship on home turf.

Semifinals; Saturday, June 1
NW2	Utah Wild	15
SW1	Bay Area Falcons	13
NW1	Colorado Alpenglow	19
SW2	San Diego Super Bloom	15

Championship; Sunday, June 2
NW2	Utah Wild	12
NW1	Colorado Alpenglow	20
Third place
SW1	Bay Area Falcons	15
SW2	San Diego Super Bloom	17

==== 2025 ====
The 2025 tournament took place June 7-8 at Fremont High School in Oakland, California, with San Diego Super Bloom defeating the Bay Area Falcons 12-10 in the championship final on Sunday, June 8 to claim their first WUL title.

Super Bloom advanced to the final after defeating Seattle Tempest in the semifinals, while Bay Area advanced by beating Colorado Alpenglow. The championship marked the end of a three-year streak where the host city won the title, as Bay Area was unable to continue that tradition on their home field.

San Diego finished the 2025 regular season with a 5-1 record before their championship run. The team was led by MVP finalists Kaela Helton and Dena Elimelech, along with DPOTY finalist Kaitlyn Weaver and OPOTY finalist Kelli Iwamoto.

Semifinals; Saturday, June 7
1	Colorado Alpenglow	16
4	Bay Area Falcons	19
2	San Diego Super Bloom	17
3	Seattle Tempest	16

Finals; Sunday, June 8
4	Bay Area Falcons	10
2	San Diego Super Bloom	12
Third place
1	Colorado Alpenglow	13
3	Seattle Tempest	18

==== 2026 ====
Championship Weekend 2026 took place June 13-14, hosted at UO Portland in Portland, Oregon. This year's tournament did not feature a third place game, the first tournament without one in league history. Seattle Tempest defeated San Diego Super Bloom 13-8 in the championship final on Sunday, June 14 to claim their third WUL title.

Seattle advanced to the final after defeating the Bay Area Falcons 21-11 in the semifinals, while San Diego advanced by beating Colorado Alpenglow 16-14. It was the first Championship Weekend held in Oregon.

Seattle was led by 2026 league MVP Jamie Kauffman and OPOTY winner Cheryl Hsu, both of whom received their awards during halftime of the final. Also leading the team were DPOTY finalist Meg Manning and BPOTY finalist Gemma Munck.

Semifinals; Saturday, June 13
NW1	Seattle Tempest	21
SW2	Bay Area Falcons	11
SW1	San Diego Super Bloom	16
NW2	Colorado Alpenglow	14

Final; Sunday, June 14
NW1	Seattle Tempest	13
SW1	San Diego Super Bloom	8

== WUL vs PUL All-Star Game ==
The first-ever WUL vs PUL All-Star Game took place on August 23, 2025, in Madison, Wisconsin, during the UFA's Championship Weekend. This historic matchup brought together the top players from both professional women's and non-binary ultimate leagues, with rosters selected through a combination of fan voting and coach selection. The game was scheduled during UFA Championship Weekend to maximize visibility and energy, featuring high-quality live streaming and benefiting from the national championship audience atmosphere.

This inaugural All-Star Game represented a significant milestone for women's and non-binary ultimate, showcasing the talent from both leagues on a premier stage. The event was included with Saturday UFA title game tickets, making it accessible to championship weekend attendees and marking a new chapter in professional women's ultimate competition.

Season	Date	Champion	Final Score	Runner-up	Venue	Location
2025	August 23, 2025	PUL	15-9	WUL	Breese Stevens Field	Madison, WI

== Awards ==
WUL end of season awards are voted on by players, coaches, league officials, and media members, ensuring a balanced evaluation that considers both on-field performance and overall contribution to the league and sport.

=== MVP ===
Most Valuable Player Award
Season	Winner	Nominees
2023	Kaela Helton	Kaela Helton, Abby Thorpe, Jade McLaughlin, Kaitlyn Weaver, Paige Kercher
2024	Abby Thorpe	Abby Thorpe, Brooke Stanislawski, Chip Chang, Kaela Helton, Kelli Iwamoto
2025	Kaela Helton	Kaela Helton, Dena Elimelech, Robyn Fennig, Abby Thorpe, Rory Veldman

=== OPOTY ===
Offensive Player of the Year
Season	Winner	Nominees
2023	Paige Kercher	Paige Kercher, Alex Diaz, Chip Chang, Maggie O'Connor, Paige Applegate
2024	Ari Nelson	Ari Nelson, Cheryl Hsu, Han Chen, LP Aragon, Paige Applegate
2025	Ari Nelson	Ari Nelson, Paige Applegate, Melissa Dunn, Kelli Iwamoto, Kat Songer

=== DPOTY ===
Defensive Player of the Year
Season	Winner	Nominees
2023	Molly Robbins	Molly Robbins, Avalon Igawa, Dena Elimelech, Kristen Pojunis, Rory Veldman
2024	Dena Elimelech	Dena Elimelech, Abbie Davis, Allysha Dixon, Blaise Sevier, Cynthia Thomas
2025	Sadie Jezierski	Sadie Jezierski, Georgia Cardosa, Justine Cherwink, Jackie Riley, Kaitlyn Weaver

=== CSOTY ===
Coaching Staff of the Year
Season	Winner	Record	Nominees
2023	San Diego Super Bloom (Head Coach Angela Wells, and asst. coaches Benjamin Eto, Alisha Stoun, Jonathan Helton, Carlos Ruiz, Shar Stuht, Henry Argetsinger, Jeremy Cho)	6-2	
2024	Bay Area Falcons (Head Coach Manisha Daryani and Assistant Coaches Shaun Webb, Candice Tse, and Byron Liu)	5-1	Bay Area Falcons, Arizona Sidewinders, Colorado Alpenglow, San Diego Super Bloom, Seattle Tempest, Utah Wild
2025	Colorado Alpenglow (Head Coach Madison "Badger" Oleson, Defensive Coach Lena Goren, and Offensive Coach Thomas Echols)	6-0	Colorado Alpenglow, San Diego Super Bloom, Seattle Tempest
