= Milwaukee Monarchs =

Professional ultimate team

- Sport: Ultimate
- Founded: 2020
- League: Premier Ultimate League
- Based in: Milwaukee, Wisconsin
- Head coach: Becky LeDonne
- Website: milwaukeemonarchs.com

The Milwaukee Monarchs are a professional women's ultimate team based in Milwaukee that competes in the Premier Ultimate League (PUL). The team joined the PUL in 2020 as part of the 2020 expansion.

== Franchise history ==
On December 3, 2019 the PUL, which had held its inaugural season in 2019, announced that it would be adding four new teams including the Milwaukee Monarchs, Washington DC Shadow, Portland Rising, and Minnesota Strike. The Monarchs were founded by Ness Cannaday, Austin Prucha, Katy Stanton, and Dan Laurila.

The 2020 season was cancelled due to the COVID-19 pandemic, so the Monarchs did not compete until 2021. The Monarchs hosted one of the three regional competitions that made up the 2021 PUL Championship Series, which served as an abbreviated competition season in response to the ongoing COVID-19 pandemic. The Monarchs defeated the Columbus Pride and Indianapolis Red to win the Midwest competition.

== Leadership team ==
- Ben Iberle | General manager
- Benjy Keren | Game Day Operations
- Kevin Cannaday | Game Day Operations
- Rachel Romaniak | Livestream Coordinator
- Adam Ruffner | Production Coordinator
- Alex Leutenegger | Partnerships Coordinator
- Jake Wilson | Social Media & Marketing

== Current coaching staff ==
- Head coach – Caitlin Murphy (MurphDawg)
- Assistant coach – Nick Hwang (DJ)
- Assistant coach – Katy Stanton

== Roster ==
The 2020 roster was as follows:

2020 DC Shadow				
#	Name	Pronouns	College	Club Team
2	Alex Hu	She/Her	Northwestern	Madison Heist
3	Madison Moore	She/Her	University of Chicago	
4	Jenni Corcoran	She/Her	University of Kansas	Chicago Nemesis
5	Rose Glinka	She/Her	Case Western Reserve University	Madison Heist
6	Risa Umeno	She/Her	University of Illinois at Urbana-Champaign	Chicago Nemesis
7	Ness Cannaday	She/Her		Madison NOISE
8	Anna Williams	She/Her	Wesleyan University	
9	Sabrina Hoffman	She/Her	UW-Madison	Madison Heist
10	Emilie Willingham	She/Her	Truman State University	
12	Kaitlynne Roling	She/Her	UW-Madison	Madison NOISE
14	Rachel Enyeart	She/Her	Indiana University	Madison Heist
16	Margaret Walker	She/Her	UW-Madison	Madison Heist
17	Sara Stuedemann	They/Them	Iowa State University	Madison Heist
19	Georgia Bosscher	She/Her	UW-Madison	Washington DC Space Heater
20	Hannah Frank	She/Her	UW-Madison	
21	Rachel Foster	She/Her	University of Illinois at Urbana-Champaign	Chicago Nemesis
22	Mila Flowerman	She/Her	UW-Madison	Madison Heist
23	Melissa Gibbs	She/Her	Iowa State University	
24	Sarah Davis	She/Her	University of Washington	Chicago Nemesis
25	Gerene Taylor	She/Her	California State University, Long Beach	
33	Katy Stanton	She/Her	Lawrence University	Madison NOISE
34	Mackenzie Carpenter	She/Her	Valparaiso University	
38	Sara Gnolek	She/Her	Northwestern	
44	Keila Strick	She/Her	University of Virginia	Washington DC Scandal
50	Anna Thorn	She/Her	University of Utah	Chicago Nemesis
69	Clea Poklemba	She/Her		Washington DC Space Heater
72	Jacqueline Jarik	She/Her	University of Michigan	Chicago Nemesis
84	Sarah Lipscomb	She/Her	University of Notre Dame	Chicago Nemesis
85	Heather Vilbrandt	She/Her	UW-Milwaukee	
87	Austin Prucha	She/Her		Washington DC Scandal
88	Linh Hoang	She/Her	New York University	San Francisco Polar Bears
