= DC Shadow =

Ultimate frisbee team in Washington DC

Washington, DC Shadow
- Sport: Ultimate
- Founded: 2020
- League: Premier Ultimate League
- Based in: Washington, D.C.
- President: Dave Tornquist
- Head coach: Allison Maddux
- Championships: 2025, 2026
- Website: dcshadowultimate.com

The DC Shadow are a professional women's ultimate team based in Washington, D.C. that competes in the Premier Ultimate League (PUL). The team joined the PUL as part of the 2020 expansion but as a result of the league's decision to cancel the 2020 season due to the COVID-19 pandemic they did not compete in a full season until 2022.

== Franchise history ==
On December 3, 2019, the PUL, which held its inaugural season in 2019, announced that it would be adding 4 new teams, including the DC Shadow, Milwaukee Monarchs, Portland Rising, and Minnesota Strike.

== Current coaching staff ==
- Head coach – Allison Maddux
- Assistant coach (Strategy & Defense) - Chance Cochran
- Assistant coach (Strategy & Offense) - John Agan
- Assistant coach (Operations & Community Liaison) - Kelly Ross

=== All-time head coaches ===
#	Name	Term	Regular Season				Playoffs			
#	Name	Term	GC	W	L	W%	GC	W	L	W%
1	Allison Maddux	2020-	Season canceled due to COVID-19							
