= Revolution (ultimate) =

Medellín Revolution
- Sport: Ultimate
- Founded: 2004
- League: Premier Ultimate League
- Based in: Medellín, Colombia
- Head coach: Mauricio Moore
- Championships: 2019, 2022
- Website: revolutionultimate.com

The Medellín Revolution (also known as Colombia Revolution) is a women's ultimate team based in Medellín, Colombia which competes professionally in the Premier Ultimate League (PUL) and as a club team in national and international competitions. The team has represented Colombia on the international stage numerous times. As a team, they are known for a unique free-spirited attitude and a fast-paced, relentless style of play; they are considered one of the top club teams in the world. Plays by several of their players have been selected for the ESPN SportsCenter Top 10 highlights show.

The Revolution club was co-founded by coach Mauricio Moore and Andrea Trujillo in 2004 in response to the lack of playing opportunities for women to play ultimate in Colombia. The Revolution have won 11 consecutive club women's championships in Colombia, beginning in 2009.

The Revolution joined the PUL for the league's inaugural 2019 season as the only competing team not based in the United States. The team went undefeated and won the 2019 PUL championship.

== As a PUL team ==
The Revolution is one of the original eight teams in the Premier Ultimate League. They participated in a 2018 series of showcase games among several teams who would go on to become founding members of the PUL.

The team would have played its second season in 2020, but the PUL cancelled the season due to the COVID-19 pandemic.

=== Record ===
Considered a clear front-runner for the 2019 regular season, the Revolution lived up to pre-season expectations and defeated the Atlanta Soul 30–20 in the first ever pro women's ultimate game in Colombia and again 24–17 in Atlanta, the Raleigh Radiance 16–13, the Columbus Pride 18–16, and the Indianapolis Red 16–6. This record gave them a first-place finish in the league prior to playoffs. Again a heavy favorite in the playoffs, the Revolution defeated the Atlanta Soul 27–26 in a double overtime semifinal game before besting the Raleigh Radiance 20–14 in the championship game.

Year	Reg. season	Playoffs	Finish
2019	5-0 (first)	2-0	Champion
2020	Season Cancelled	0-0	Season Cancelled
Total	5-0	2-0	

=== Current coaching staff ===
Mauricio Moore coaches Revolution in both the PUL and in club competition.

=== Roster ===
The team's roster differs somewhat between club and professional competition. The team's 2020 PUL roster was as follows:

2020 Medellín Revolution				
#	Name	Pronouns	College	Most Recent Club Team
	Emily Berman			
	Inbal Haviva			
	Jesse Shofner		University of Oregon	Denver Molly Brown
	Lisa Pitcaithley		UC Santa Barbara	Denver Molly Brown
	Aki Younge		Yale University	Washington DC Scandal
	Alejandra Torres			Revolution
	Alejandra Uribe			Revolution
	Anali Maya			
	Ana Maria Rojas			Revolution
	Andrea Bustamante			
	Carolina Angel			
	Claire Chastain		University of North Carolina	Denver Molly Brown
	Elizabeth Mosquera			Revolution
	Gabriela Jimenez			Revolution
	Karen Rico			
	Laura Ospina			Revolution
	Levke Walczak			
	Luisa Sanchez			
	Manuela Cardenas			Revolution
	Maria Angelica Forero			Revolution
	Maria Paula Santos			Revolution
	Mish Phillips			
	Valentina Gomez			
	Valeria Cardenas			Revolution
	Ximena Montana			Revolution
	Yina Cartagena			Revolution

== As a club team ==
The Revolution have competed as a club team since 2004 and have won 11 consecutive Colombian national championships beginning in 2009.

They have also been highly successful in international club competition, winning major tournaments like the US Open (2017) and consistently placing highly against top US and international competition.

They placed second at the 2018 World Ultimate Club Championships and seventh at the 2014 World Ultimate Club Championships. Colombian national women's teams, which have been coached by Revolution coach Mauricio Moore since at least 2017, are often populated largely by Revolution players and have likewise been successful in recent years.

The team has a close relationship with Denver Molly Brown, with several members of each team playing for the other in various club and professional competitions.
