= New York Gridlock =

NY Gridlock
- Sport: Ultimate
- Founded: 2019
- League: Premier Ultimate League
- Based in: New York City
- Head coaches: Eileen Murray and Ryan Thompson
- Championships: 2024
- Website: nygridlockultimate.com

The New York Gridlock are a professional women's ultimate team based in New York City that competes in the Premier Ultimate League (PUL). The team joined the PUL for the league's inaugural 2019 season.

== Franchise history ==
The New York Gridlock formed in early 2019, and is one of the original eight teams in the Premier Ultimate League. Their name likely references New York's common rush-hour gridlock traffic.

The team would have played its second season in 2020, but the PUL cancelled the season due to the COVID-19 pandemic.

== Record ==
In their 2019 season, the Gridlock defeated the Indianapolis Red 14–9, the Columbus Pride 17–10, the Austin Torch 14–12, and the Atlanta Soul 21–17. They fell to the Raleigh Radiance 20–11. This record gave them a third-place finish in the league. In the league semifinals, they again lost to the Raleigh Radiance, 19–18.

Year	Reg. season	Playoffs	Finish
2019	4-1 (3rd)	0-1	Lost in Semifinals
2020	Season Cancelled	0-0	Season Cancelled
Total	4-1	0-1	

== Current coaching staff ==
- Coach - Ryan Thompson (he/him/his)
- Coach - Eileen Murray (she/her/hers)
- Coach - Martha Gregory (she/her/hers)

== Roster ==
The team's 2020 roster was as follows:

2020 New York Gridlock				
#	Name	Pronouns	College	Most Recent Club Team
00	Genny De Jesus	She/Her		NJ Jughandle
2	Brittany "Bkap" Kaplan	She/Her		New York BENT
4	Nastasia "Stazi" Tangherlini	She/Her		New York BENT
5	Lindsay McKenna	She/Her	West Chester University	West Chester Loco
6	Janine Hlavaty	She/Her		New York BENT
7	Luisa Neves	She/Her	University of Rochester	New York BENT
8	Kelly "Beezus" Hyland	She/Her		Washington DC Space Heater
9	Sarah Johnson	She/Her		Philadelphia AMP
10	Natalie Bova			Philadelphia AMP
11	Danielle Walsh			Philadelphia AMP
12	Amy Zhou	She/Her	Rutgers University	Washington DC Scandal
13	Becca Tucker	She/Her		Albany Rebel Rebel
14	Tulsa Douglas	She/Her	St. Olaf College	Boston Brute Squad
16	Jessica Shatkin			New York BENT
17	Margo Cody			New York BENT
18	Wei Gao	She/Her		New York BENT
20	Karen Chalif	She/Her		New York XIST
21	Linda Morse	She/Her		Philadelphia AMP
22	Lauren Woods	She/Her		New York BENT
23	Andrea DeSabato	She/Her		Philadelphia AMP
24	Casey Gorman			Washington DC Scandal
33	Lauren Piontek	She/Her		New York XIST
41	Martha Gregory			New York BENT
44	Raha Mozaffari	She/Her		Philadelphia AMP
71	Cassie Wong	She/Her		Boston Brute Squad
88	Nikki Hair	She/Her		NJ Jughandle
99	Veronica Kolegue-Spalaris	She/Her		Albany Rebel Rebel
PP	Abbey Stolowski			NJ Pine Baroness
PP	Caroline Turner			Hudson Valley Funk
PP	Kyla Dayer	She/Her	University of Rochester	Brooklyn Grand Army
PP	Tricia Smit	She/Her		New York XIST

== Social justice and equity ==
In 2020, the Gridlock raised over $10,000 for the National Bail Out collective, a Black-led and Black-centered collective of abolitionist organizers, lawyers and activists building a community-based movement to end systems of pretrial detention and ultimately mass incarceration. Social justice and equity are built into their mission statement, with text that centers gender and racial equity and accountability in community partnerships. These were elaborated further by Eileen Murray, owner and General Manager, and Khunsa Amin, Director of Community, Outreach, and Operations in an interview with Still Out of Your League.
