= Portland Rising =

- Sport: Ultimate
- Founded: 2020
- League: Premier Ultimate League
- Based in: Portland, Maine
- Website: portlandrising.me/

The Portland Rising is a professional ultimate team based in Portland, Maine, which competes in the Premier Ultimate League. It plays at Fitzpatrick Stadium. The team is currently on hiatus, choosing not to participate in the 2025 PUL season.

The club's stated mission is to "dream big and work in partnership with our community to RISE together."

== Franchise history ==
Portland Rising formed for the 2020 season as part of a four-team expansion to the PUL. The team is owned by Chloë Rowse and is the first professional sports team to feature women, non-binary, trans, and genderfluid athletes in Maine. The team held tryouts with over 100 attendees in January 2020 and announced its roster for the inaugural season in March 2020.

The team would have played its first season in 2020 (as part of PUL's second season of play), but the PUL cancelled the season due to the COVID-19 pandemic. Of the cancellation, Rowse stated, "Regardless of what happens here in Portland and around the world over the next weeks and months, Rising is already so much more than this season's schedule. The Rising community and Rising energy that has been created over the past three months aren't going anywhere."

in August of 2021 Rising hosted one of the three regional competitions that made up the 2021 PUL Championship Series, which served as an abbreviated competition season in response to the ongoing COVID-19 pandemic. Rising was defeated by the Austin Torch and Medellin Revolution to finish 3rd in the International competition.

During the 2022 regular reason Rising compiled a 5-1 record, finishing second in the East Division. Multiple milestones were achieved for the franchise, including the first victory, as well as the first home win.

== Schedule ==
2022 Regular season schedule.

Date	Opponent	Score	Result
April 16	Austin Torch	17-14 (OT)	Win
April 23	Atlanta Soul	16-11	Win
May 14	Columbus Pride	17-11	Win
May 28	Nashville Nightshade	23-14	Win
June 4	NY Gridlock	20-15	Win
June 5	DC Shadow	6-22	Loss

== Record ==
Year	Reg. season	Playoffs	Finish
2021	Cancelled	0-2	3rd International
2022	5-1	1st Round	2nd East
2023	2-4		4th East
2024	2-4		4th East
2025	Hiatus		
Total			

== Current staff ==
- Coach - Ryan Cardinal (he/him)
- Coach - Eva Fury (they/them)
- Coach - Ethan Fortin (he/him)
- GM - Mohdis Baker (she/her)

== Roster ==
The team's 2022 roster is as follows:

2022 Portland Rising
#	Name	Pronouns	Nickname	College	Club Team
2	Emily Decker			Tufts	Brute Squad
3	Kate Powers		KPow	Bowdoin College	Frolic
4	Makk K			MIT	
5	Laura BItterman			University of Wisconsin-Madison	
6	Chloe Rowse			Colorado College	Slow
7	Alex Ode			University of Oregon	Brute Squad
9	Lisa Liu			MIT	Chaotic Good
10	Lauren Baecher		Bae	University of Vermont	Slow White
11	Josie Gillett		Future	Bates College	Frolic
13	Samantha Munson			Southern Maine Community College	Sunken Circus
14	Hannah Baranes			Dartmouth University	Slow White
15	Caitlin Fitzgerald		Fitz	University of Kansas	Slow White
16	Erin Rea			Middlebury College	Brute Squad
17	Kelsey Devlin			University of Delaware	
19	Olivia Hampton			Boston College	Slow White
23	Colette Pellegrini		Coco	Worcester Polytechnic Institute	Sprocket
25	Sophie Shen			Northeastern University	
26	Rachael Westgate			University of Wisconsin	Slow White
27	Sarah Judd		SJ	Harvard University	Wild Card
30	Jean Huang			University of Illinois Urbana-Champaign	Sprocket
31	Bethany Eldridge			University of Vermont	
32	Megan Wilson		Moose	Tufts University	Brute Squad
33	Yuge Xiao			Columbia University	Brute Squad
37	Hannah Henkin		Hank	University of Michigan	Brute Squad
55	Sophie Knowles			Case Western Reserve University	Brute Squad
60	Caitlin Go			Stanford University	Sprocket
76	Emma Palacio			Northeastern University	Green Means Go
83	Zoe Hecht			Oberlin College	
