= Premier Ultimate League =

U.S. women's ultimate frisbee league

- Sport: Ultimate
- Founded: 2019
- First season: 2019
- No. of teams: 10
- Most recent champion: DC Shadow (2026)
- Website: premierultimateleague.com

The Premier Ultimate League (PUL) is a women's professional ultimate league in the United States. Formed in 2019, the mission of the PUL is "to achieve equity in the sport of ultimate by increasing accessibility to the sport for, and visibility of women, transgender, intersex, non-binary, genderqueer, and genderfluid people through high-quality competition, leadership experiences, and community partnerships". The league strives for gender, racial, and economic diversity in the sport of ultimate frisbee. PUL players are paid US$40 per league game.

The PUL is organized as a 501c6 nonprofit entity. In its inaugural year it raised funds by holding a "Sponsor-A-Player" program, raising $120,000 in one week. This program was repeated for the 2020 and 2022 seasons with similar success.

== History ==
The league began with eight teams in 2019. The inaugural championship was won by the Medellin Revolution.

The 2020 season saw the addition of four new teams and the organization of the league into two divisions, Central and East. On April 24, 2020, the PUL announced the cancellation of the 2020 season due to the COVID-19 pandemic.

In response to the ongoing COVID-19 pandemic, the PUL elected to hold a limited 2021 competition season with games occurring across three weekends in August 2021 in New York, Milwaukee, and Portland, Maine. With three teams competing at each event, the Raleigh Radiance, Milwaukee Monarchs, and Medellin Revolution emerged victorious.

Starting in 2022, the league was divided into three divisions; Midwest, South, and East. The Medellin Revolution defeated the DC Shadow in the 2022 championship game to win their second successive championship.

In December 2022, it was announced that Medellin would be leaving the PUL to join a new Latin American league, and that they would be replaced by the Philadelphia Surge.

In November 2023, it was announced that Columbus would be leaving temporarily, and the remaining teams would be redistributed into two divisions, North and South.

After the 2024 season the Los Angeles Astra joined the PUL from the Western Ultimate League. They played in the 2025 season, returning to the WUL for 2026.

In December 2024, the Portland Rising announced that they would be suspending operations.

== Rules ==
The PUL rules are a hybrid version of USA Ultimate 11th edition rules with influences from both World Flying Disc Federation (WFDF) rules and Ultimate Frisbee Association (UFA, formerly American Ultimate Disc League or AUDL) rules.

The playing field is 80 yards long and 40 yards wide, with 20 yard end zones. Games consist of four 12-minute quarters with 2 minutes between quarters and a 10-minute halftime. Play at the end of the first three quarters concludes with the end of the current possession once the clock expires. In the 4th quarter and overtime (which lasts 4 minutes), play ends when the result of the throw is determined once the clock hits 0:00. If a tie exists at the end of the first overtime period, a second sudden death overtime occurs in which the first team to score wins. The clock does not run between the scoring of a goal and when the subsequent pull is touched. There are 70 seconds allotted between pulls.

PUL games are self-officiated with the assistance of observers, not referees. Marking and throwing fouls follow USAU 11th edition rules, while receiving and positioning fouls follow the WFDF rules. This, along with the end-of-quarter rules, are intended to reduce the likelihood of dangerous contact and injuries. Observers actively call up/down, in/out of bounds or end zone, offsides, and delay of game infractions. Foul discussions must move quickly: before asking an observer for a ruling, players may only discuss for 10 seconds, and observers must rule within 10 seconds or the play is considered contested.

Time-outs allow teams to substitute any number of players on the field, as well as reset the stall count to zero. Defensive players must be within two yards of the offender they are covering in order to call a pick.

The PUL employs a player overrule option similar to the UFA's integrity rule so that players can reverse a call made in favor of their team if they feel the ruling was incorrect or unfairly benefited their team.

== Teams ==
PUL teams (North in blue, South in green, former in red)

| Team | City/area | Founded | First season |
|---|---|---|---|
North
| Indianapolis Red | Indianapolis, IN | 2018 | 2019 |
| Milwaukee Monarchs | Milwaukee, WI | 2020 | 2021 |
| Minnesota Strike | Twin Cities, MN | 2019 | 2022 |
| New York Gridlock | New York, NY | 2019 | 2019 |
| Philadelphia Surge | Philadelphia, PA | 2023 | 2023 |
South
| Atlanta Soul | Atlanta, GA | 2018 | 2019 |
| Austin Torch | Austin, TX | 2019 | 2019 |
| DC Shadow | Washington, DC | 2020 | 2021 |
| Nashville Nightshade | Nashville, TN | 2018 | 2019 |
| Raleigh Radiance | Raleigh, NC | 2018 | 2019 |

=== Former teams ===
| Team | Location | First season | Last season | Fate |
|---|---|---|---|---|
| Columbus Pride | Columbus, OH | 2019 | 2023 | Hiatus |
| Medellin Revolution | Medellin, Colombia | 2019 | 2022 | Moved to LatAm League |
| Portland Rising | Portland, ME | 2020 | 2024 | Hiatus |
| Los Angeles Astra | Los Angeles, CA | 2025 | 2025 | Moved back to WUL |

== Champions ==
PUL champions
| Season | Date | Champion | Final score | Runner-up | Venue | Location |
|---|---|---|---|---|---|---|
| 2019 | June 29, 2019 | Medellin Revolution | 20–14 | Raleigh Radiance | Silverbacks Park | Atlanta |
| 2020 | NA | Canceled due to the COVID-19 pandemic | NA | NA | NA | NA |
| 2021 | NA | Canceled due to the COVID-19 pandemic | NA | NA | NA | NA |
| 2022 | June 19, 2022 | Medellin Revolution | 17–15 | DC Shadow | Fortress Obetz | Obetz, OH |
| 2023 | June 18, 2023 | Raleigh Radiance | 18–16 | New York Gridlock | Carlini Field | Washington, D.C. |
| 2024 | June 23, 2024 | New York Gridlock | 16–10 | DC Shadow | Vidas Field | Philadelphia |
| 2025 | June 15, 2025 | DC Shadow | 18–17 | Raleigh Radiance | Wisconsin Rugby Sports Complex | Madison, WI |
| 2026 | June 21, 2026 | DC Shadow | 20-10 | Philadelphia Surge | Durham County Memorial Stadium | Durham, NC |

== See also ==
- Western Ultimate League
