= Nashville Nightshade =

Professional women's ultimate frisbee team

The Nashville Nightshade are a professional women's ultimate team based in Nashville, Tennessee, that competes in the Premier Ultimate League (PUL). The Nightshade were one of the eight founding teams of the league. With the cancellation of the PUL's 2020 season due to the COVID-19 pandemic, the Nightshade have only played one season. The Nightshade are a community-owned nonprofit organization.

== Franchise history ==
Founded in 2018, the Nightshade began play in 2019, the PUL's first season of play. The Nightshade's second season was scheduled to begin in 2020, however, the COVID-19 pandemic put a pause on most professional sports leagues, the PUL included.
