= 2025 The Arena League season =

American football league season

2025 TAL season
- League: The Arena League
- Sport: Arena football
- Duration: May 30 – August 9, 2025
- Games: 8 per team
- Teams: 6
- Streaming partner: YouTube
- Regular Season Champions: Duluth Harbor Monsters
- Season MVP: Brandon Mackey

Playoffs
- Semifinal champions: Duluth Harbor Monsters
- Semifinal runners-up: Ozarks Lunkers
- Semifinal champions: Hot Springs Wiseguys
- Semifinal runners-up: Iowa Woo

ArenaMania II
- Date: August 9th, 2025
- Venue: DECC Arena
- Champions: Duluth Harbor Monsters
- Runners-up: Hot Springs Wiseguys

TAL seasons
- ← 2024 2026 →

The 2025 Arena League season was the second season of The Arena League (The AL or TAL).

== Teams ==
On April 5, 2024, the league released a list of five markets, which people could vote on at the AL website for the city to be an expansion franchise beginning in the 2025 season. The five markets included: Dallas, Texas; Eau Claire, Wisconsin; St. Joseph, Missouri; Hot Springs, Arkansas; and Rochester, Minnesota, which was a part of the inaugural season voting. On April 25, 2024, the league announced that Hot Springs would be the first expansion team and will begin play in 2025. The league announced Eau Claire as the second expansion team on May 17, 2024.

In April 2025, the Kansas City Goats announced they would change their name permanently to the St. Joseph Goats.

This was the last TAL season that the Duluth Harbor Monsters have competed in and won their second Arena League championship before joining Arena Football One.

Team	City	Stadium	Capacity	Joined	Head coach
Duluth Harbor Monsters	Duluth, Minnesota	DECC Arena	5,333	2024	Tony O'Neil
Eau Claire Axemen	Eau Claire, Wisconsin	Sonnentag Event Center	3,250	2025	Tae Brooks
Hot Springs Wiseguys	Hot Springs, Arkansas	Bank OZK Arena	4,141	2025	Bones Bagaunte
Iowa Woo	Waterloo, Iowa	The Hippodrome	5,155	2024	Victor Mann
St. Joseph Goats	St. Joseph, Missouri	St. Joseph Civic Arena	3,800	2024	Dorsey Golston III
Ozarks Lunkers	Springfield, Missouri	Wilson Logistics Arena	4,500	2024	Cam Bruffett

Locations of teams in The Arena League for 2025 season.

== Season format ==
The second season of The Arena League will have a nine-week regular season schedule with each team receiving one bye week with playoffs to follow. The season will run from May 30 to August 9, 2025.

== Schedule ==
All games in Central Time Zone (CT)

=== Preseason ===
Preseason
Date	Away	Final		Home	Venue
May 24th, 7:00	Knoxville Bandits	8	64	Duluth Harbor Monsters	DECC Arena
May 24th, 7:05	Midwest Raptors	25	84	Iowa Woo	The Hippodrome

=== Regular season ===
Week 1
Date	Away	Final		Home	Venue
May 30th, 7:05	Duluth Harbor Monsters	71	56	Iowa Woo	The Hippodrome
May 31st, 8:05	Eau Claire Axemen	24	38	Hot Springs Wiseguys	Bank OZK Arena
May 31st, 7:05	St. Joseph Goats	50	54	Ozarks Lunkers	Wilson Logistics Arena

Week 2
Date	Away	Final		Home	Venue
June 7th, 6:05	Ozarks Lunkers	44	49	Eau Claire Axemen	Sonnentag Event Center
June 7th, 7:05	Duluth Harbor Monsters	46	45	St. Joseph Goats	St. Joseph Civic Arena
June 8th, 3:05	Hot Springs Wiseguys	26	44	Iowa Woo	The Hippodrome

Week 3
Date	Away	Final		Home	Venue
June 14th, 7:05	Hot Springs Wiseguys	43	31	Duluth Harbor Monsters	DECC Arena
June 14th, 7:05	Ozarks Lunkers	42	61	Iowa Woo	The Hippodrome
June 14th, 6:05	St. Joseph Goats	55	46	Eau Claire Axemen	Sonnentag Event Center

Week 4
Date	Away	Final		Home	Venue
June 21st, 8:05	Ozarks Lunkers	45	41	Hot Springs Wiseguys	Bank OZK Arena
June 21st, 7:05	Iowa Woo	74	73	St. Joseph Goats	St. Joseph Civic Arena
June 21st, 6:05	Duluth Harbor Monsters	47	40	Eau Claire Axemen	Sonnentag Event Center

Week 5
Date	Away	Final		Home	Venue
June 28th, 7:05	Iowa Woo	38	60	Duluth Harbor Monsters	DECC Arena
June 28th, 7:05	Eau Claire Axemen	26	64	St. Joseph Goats	St. Joseph Civic Arena
June 28th, 7:05	Hot Springs Wiseguys	57	48	Ozarks Lunkers	Wilson Logistics Arena

Week 6
Date	Away	Final		Home	Venue
July 5th, 7:05	Duluth Harbor Monsters	45	62	Ozark Lunkers	Wilson Logistics Arena

Week 7
Date	Away	Final		Home	Venue
July 12th, 7:05	Iowa Woo	34	48	Ozarks Lunkers	Wilson Logistics Arena
July 12th, 7:05	Hot Springs Wiseguys	13	57	St. Joseph Goats	St. Joseph Civic Arena
July 12th, 7:05	Eau Claire Axemen	26	54	Duluth Harbor Monsters	DECC Arena

Week 8
Date	Away	Final		Home	Venue
July 18th, 7:05	Eau Claire Axemen	35	60	Iowa Woo	The Hippodrome
July 19th, 7:05	St. Joseph Goats	37	41	Hot Springs Wiseguys	Bank OZK Arena

Week 9
Date	Away	Final		Home	Venue
July 26th, 6:05	St. Joseph Goats	57	40	Eau Claire Axemen	Sonnentag Event Center
July 12th, 7:05	Iowa Woo	42	46	Hot Springs Wiseguys	Bank OZK Arena
June 28th, 7:05	Ozarks Lunkers	30	72	Duluth Harbor Monsters	DECC Arena

== Standings ==
2025 The Arena League Standings
Team	Win	Loss	PCT	GB	PF	PA	STK
Duluth Harbor Monsters	6	2	.750	-	426	340	W2
Hot Springs Wiseguys	5	3	.625	1	305	328	W2
Iowa Woo	4	4	.500	2	409	401	L1
St. Joseph Goats	4	4	.500	2	438	340	W1
Ozarks Lunkers	4	4	.500	2	373	409	L1
Eau Claire Axemen	1	7	.125	5	286	419	L6

== Media ==
TAL team media deals
Team	TV Station(s)	Radio Station(s)	Notes
Duluth Harbor Monsters		Northland Fan 106.5 FM and 560AM	
Eau Claire Axemen			
Hot Springs Wiseguys			
Iowa Woo	KCRG-TV		(Note: The team is partnered with KWWL as the exclusive news source.)
St. Joseph Goats			
Ozarks Lunkers	KYTV		
