= Arkansas Diamonds =

Arena football team

- Current season
Logo

General information
- Founded: 2024
- Headquartered: Barton Coliseum in Little Rock, Arkansas
- Colors: Black, Red, Gray
- Mascot: Diamond
- Website: arkansasdiamonds.com

Personnel
- Owner: Mark Bertel
- General manager: Lauren Hatten
- Head coach: Bones Bagaunte
- President: Dustin Harrison

Team history
- Hot Springs Wiseguys (2025); Arkansas Diamonds (2026–present)

Home fields
- Bank OZK Arena (2025–2026); Barton Coliseum (2027–present)

League / conference affiliations
- The Arena League (2025–2026); South Division (2026); Indoor Football League (2027–present)

Championships
- Division championships: 1: TAL South: 2026

Playoff appearances (2)
- TAL: 2025, 2026

The Arkansas Diamonds are an indoor American football team that will play in the Indoor Football League (IFL) in the upcoming 2027 season. They were founded in 2025 as an expansion team of The Arena League (The AL or TAL), initially named the Hot Springs Wiseguys. Based in Little Rock, Arkansas, the Diamonds play their home games at the Barton Coliseum.

The Diamonds are the first ever arena/indoor football team based in Hot Springs.

== History ==
On April 26, 2024, Hot Springs, Arkansas was announced as the fifth team of the Arena League and its first of two expansion teams for the 2025 season, to play at Bank OZK Arena.

After a name-the-team contest was held, the Wiseguys name, logo and color scheme were announced on July 25, 2024. The Wiseguys name references Hot Springs' history with organized crime (most notably with the Hot Springs Gunfight of 1899 as well as the Arlington Hotel serving as a favorite retreat for Al Capone), while the horse mascot and logo references its history with horse racing (most notably as home of Oaklawn Racing Casino Resort, which was the only legal gambling establishment in Hot Springs until 2007).

On August 29th, 2025 the team unveiled their new name and logo, now being known as the Arkansas Diamonds. The name change was to allow them to represent the entire state of Arkansas.

On August 26th, 2026, it was announced that the team will move to the IFL in a four team expansion by the IFL. On September 15 of that year, the Diamonds announced that they would move from Hot Springs to Little Rock to play at historic Barton Coliseum.

== Season-by-season ==
Season	GP	Record	PF	PA	Finish	Playoffs
2025	8	5-3	305	328	2nd	W 57-36 vs. Iowa Woo; L 56-27 vs. Duluth Harbor Monsters; ArenaMania II Runner-Ups
2026	8	6-2	363	290	3rd	W 59-43 vs. Monroe Greenheads; L 52-30 vs. St. Joseph Goats; ArenaMania III Runner-Ups
