= Ellis Lankster =

American gridiron football player (born 1986)

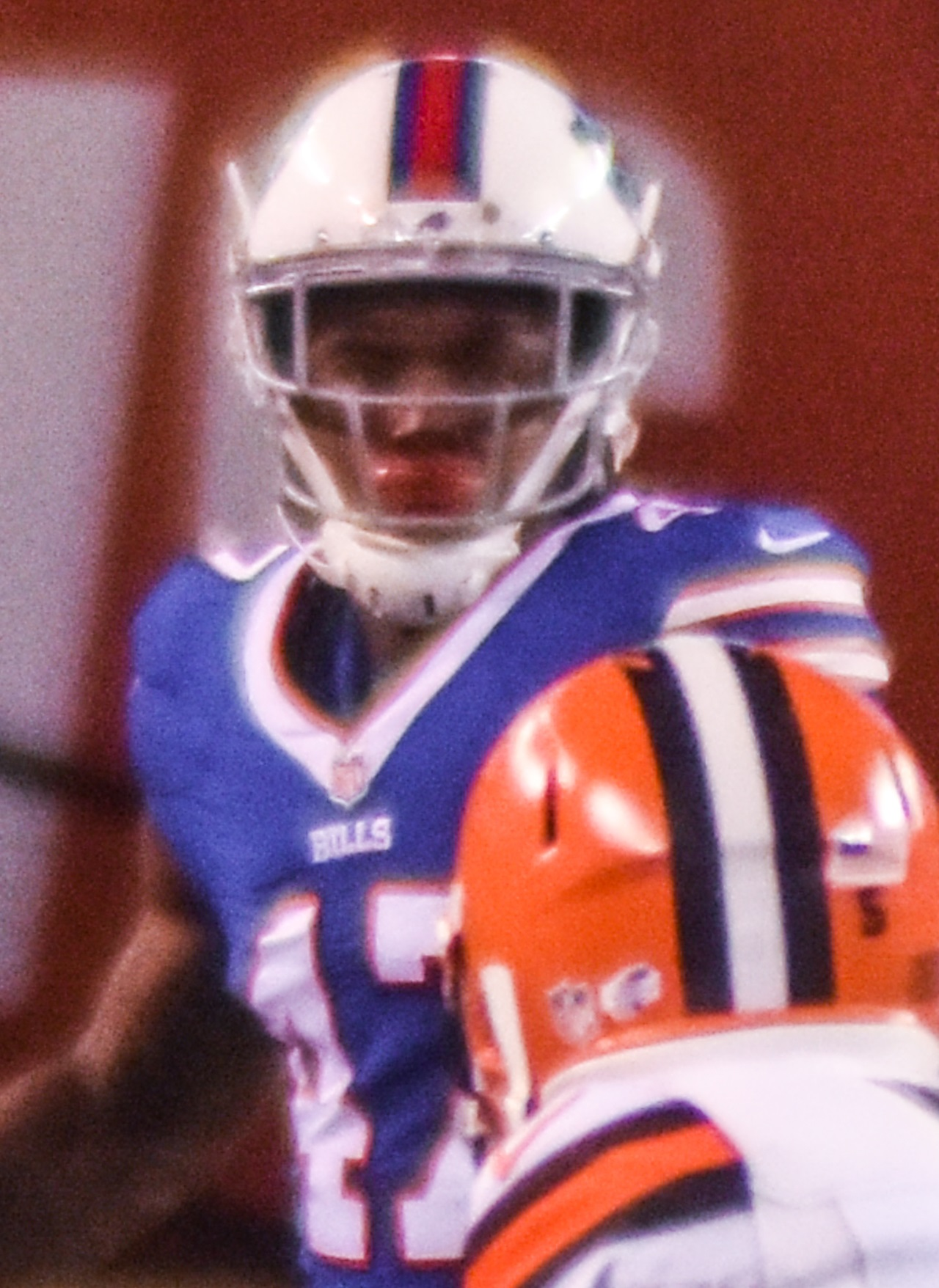
- Lankster with the Buffalo Bills in 2015

No. 25, 26, 21, 31, 47
- Position: Cornerback

Personal information
- Born: June 3, 1986 (age 40); Mobile, Alabama, U.S.
- Listed height: 5 ft 9 in (1.75 m)
- Listed weight: 210 lb (95 kg)

Career information
- High school: Vigor (Prichard, Alabama)
- College: West Virginia
- NFL draft: 2009: 7th round, 220th overall pick

Career history
- Buffalo Bills (2009); Hamilton Tiger-Cats (2010); New York Jets (2011–2014); Buffalo Bills (2015)*; Hamilton Tiger-Cats (2016); Atlanta Havoc (2018); Richmond Roughriders (2018); West Virginia Roughriders (2019); Iowa Woo (2024–present)
- * Offseason or practice squad member only

Awards and highlights
- Second-team All-Big East (2008)

Career NFL statistics
- Total tackles: 72
- Sacks: 1.0
- Forced fumbles: 2
- Fumble recoveries: 2
- Interceptions: 2
- Stats at Pro Football Reference

Ellis Lankster (born June 3, 1986) is an American professional football cornerback. He was selected by the Buffalo Bills in the seventh round of the 2009 NFL draft. He played college football at West Virginia. He was also a member of the Hamilton Tiger-Cats, New York Jets, Atlanta Havoc and Richmond/West Virginia Roughriders. He currently plays for the Iowa Woo.

== College career ==
Lankster played his freshman and sophomore years at Jones County Junior College. He finished his collegiate career at West Virginia University. He also played in the 2009 Senior Bowl.

== Professional career ==
=== Buffalo Bills (first stint) ===
Lankster was drafted 220th overall by the Buffalo Bills in the seventh round of the 2009 NFL draft. On August 15, 2009, in a preseason game against the Chicago Bears, Lankster intercepted Bears' backup quarterback Brett Basanez twice within a span of 64 seconds. Both turnovers led to touchdowns for Buffalo, ultimately helping them win the game 27–20.

Lankster got some playing time in the 2009 season as a cornerback in nickel defense situations, due to injuries to other defensive backs. Head coach Perry Fewell said of Lankster, "we think he's gotten better every week for us." He finished the 2009 season with five tackles.

Buffalo released Lankster on the deadline for final roster adjustments in the 2010 preseason, September 4.

=== Hamilton Tiger-Cats (first stint) ===
Lankster was signed by the Hamilton Tiger-Cats of the Canadian Football League on October 11, 2010. He did not play for Hamilton during his time with the club, rather he learned the intricacies of Canadian football.

=== New York Jets ===
Lankster signed a future contract with the New York Jets on January 5, 2011. He was waived on September 2. He was re-signed to the active roster on October 11. His playing time greatly increased in 2012, including significant assignments covering fast receivers, following an injury to Isaiah Trufant. He was released on September 1, 2014. He was re-signed on September 12. He was released on September 23, 2014.

=== Buffalo Bills (second stint) ===
Lankster signed with the Bills on August 17, 2015. The signing marked his return to the team that drafted him. He joined his previous head coach Rex Ryan. He was released by the team on August 31.

=== Hamilton Tiger-Cats (second stint) ===
On April 15, 2016, Lankster once again signed with the Tiger-Cats.

=== Atlanta Havoc ===
Lankster signed with the Atlanta Havoc of the American Arena League in December 2017.

=== Iowa Woo ===
On February 23, 2024, Lankster signed with the Iowa Woo of The Arena League.
