= Dan Williams III =

American gridiron football player (born 1995)

No. 81, 82, 83, 86
- Position: Wide receiver

Personal information
- Born: August 6, 1995 (age 31)
- Listed height: 6 ft 3 in (1.91 m)
- Listed weight: 200 lb (91 kg)

Career information
- High school: East St. Louis (East St. Louis, Illinois)
- College: Jackson State (2013–2016)
- NFL draft: 2017: undrafted

Career history
- New York Jets (2017–2018)*; Washington Redskins (2018)*; Cleveland Browns (2018–2019)*; Seattle Seahawks (2019)*; Memphis Express (2019); Tampa Bay Vipers (2020); Calgary Stampeders (2021); Orlando Guardians (2023); Duluth Harbor Monsters (2025); Michigan Arsenal (2026–present)
- * Offseason or practice squad member only

Daniel Williams III (born August 6, 1995) is an American professional football wide receiver. He plays for the Duluth Harbor Monsters. He played college football at Jackson State. He was also a member of the New York Jets, Washington Redskins, Cleveland Browns, Seattle Seahawks, Memphis Express, Tampa Bay Vipers, Calgary Stampeders, and Orlando Guardians.

== College career ==
Williams played four years at Jackson State. He finished as the school's all-time leader in receptions.

Season	Team	GP	Receiving			
Season	Team	GP	Rec	Yds	Avg	TD
2013	Jackson State	10	10	92	9.20	0
2014	Jackson State	12	72	990	13.75	9
2015	Jackson State	11	54	800	14.81	7
2016	Jackson State	8	47	599	12.74	3
College totals		41	183	2481	13.56	19

== Professional career ==
Pre-draft measurables
Height	Weight	Arm length	Hand span	Wingspan	40-yard dash	10-yard split	20-yard split	20-yard shuttle	Three-cone drill	Vertical jump	Broad jump	Bench press
6 ft 1 3/4 in (1.87 m)	234 lb (106 kg)	32 1/2 in (0.83 m)	9 1/2 in (0.24 m)	6 ft 5 1/4 in (1.96 m)	4.51 s	1.58 s	2.57 s	4.46 s	7.44 s	35.0 in (0.89 m)	10 ft 1 in (3.07 m)	17 reps
All values from Pro Day

=== New York Jets ===
Williams signed to the New York Jets as an undrafted free agent on August 14, 2017. He was later released and signed to the practice squad.

=== Washington Redskins ===
Williams signed a future contract with the Washington Redskins on August 13, 2018.

=== Cleveland Browns ===
Williams was signed to the practice squad of the Cleveland Browns on December 6, 2018. He was later released and signed a future contract.

=== Seattle Seahawks ===
Williams signed a future contract with the Seattle Seahawks in 2019.

=== Memphis Express ===
Williams signed with the Memphis Express in 2019.

=== Tampa Bay Vipers ===
Williams signed with the Tampa Bay Vipers in 2020. He was the league's second-leading receiver before the league was shut down.

=== Calgary Stampeders ===
Williams signed with the Calgary Stampeders in 2021.

=== Orlando Guardians ===
Williams signed with the Orlando Guardians in 2023.

=== Duluth Harbor Monsters ===
On March 7, 2025, Williams signed with the Duluth Harbor Monsters of The Arena League.

=== Career statistics ===
Year	League	Team	GP	Receiving					Rushing					Fumbles	
Year	League	Team	GP	Rec	Yds	Avg	Lng	TD	Att	Yds	Avg	Lng	TD	Fum	Lost
2019	AAF	MEM	4	17	164	9.65	40	1	—	—	—	—	—	—	—
2020	XFL	TB	5	23	338	14.70	42	1	—	—	—	—	—	—	—
2021	CFL	CGY	3	5	52	10.40	30	0	—	—	—	—	—	—	—
2023	XFL	ORL	6	15	152	10.13	19	0	—	—	—	—	—	—	—
2025	TAL	DUL	—	—	—	—	—	—	—	—	—	—	—	—	—
