= 2024 The Arena League season =

American football league season

2024 TAL season
- League: The Arena League
- Sport: Arena football
- Duration: June 1 - August 10, 2024
- Games: 8 per team
- Teams: 4
- Streaming partner: YouTube
- Regular Season Champions: Kansas City Goats
- Season MVP: Boo Smith

Playoffs
- Semifinal champions: Iowa Woo
- Semifinal runners-up: Kansas City Goats
- Semifinal champions: Duluth Harbor Monsters
- Semifinal runners-up: Ozarks Lunkers

ArenaMania I
- Date: August 10th, 2024
- Venue: DECC Arena
- Champions: Duluth Harbor Monsters
- Runners-up: Iowa Woo

TAL seasons
- 2025 →

The 2024 Arena League season was the inaugural season of The Arena League (The AL or TAL). The regular season began on June 1, 2024 and ended on July 27, 2024.

== Background ==
The Arena League was announced as a six-on-six indoor American football league with the intentions to launch in 2024 with four teams and with Pro Football Hall of Famer Tim Brown as the Commissioner. The league kicked off the regular season on June 1, 2024.

The AL's aim is to highlight the player's athleticism and increase the pace of play.

== Teams ==
The first city announced was Springfield with Duluth being the second city. Waterloo was announced as the third team on May 4, 2023. Kansas City was the fourth and final team announced for the inaugural 2024 season.

On October 19, 2023 the Waterloo Woo announced their owners and changed their team name to the Iowa Woo along with a logo redesign.

| Team | City | Stadium | Capacity | Joined | Head coach |
|---|---|---|---|---|---|
| Duluth Harbor Monsters | Duluth, Minnesota | DECC Arena | 5,333 | 2024 | Tony O'Neil |
| Iowa Woo | Waterloo, Iowa | The Hippodrome | 5,155 | 2024 | Mook Zimmerman |
| Kansas City Goats | Kansas City, Missouri | Municipal Arena | 9,987 | 2024 | Dorsey Golston III |
| Ozarks Lunkers | Springfield, Missouri | Wilson Logistics Arena | 4,500 | 2024 | Cam Bruffett |

=== League finances ===
Former IFL Commissioner, Tommy Benizio, an advisor for the league and his corporation operated and ran the teams, while J.R. Bond leads a small group financing the league; Bond is a political advisor in Kansas City and has served as owner of several professional sports teams including the Sioux City Bandits, Topeka Tropics, and Topeka Golden Giants. The league would later announce owners for all four locations.

== Players ==
Teams have a 15-player roster with the game being played with six offensive players against six defensive players. The league will follow a one-platoon system with offensive and defensive players playing both sides of the ball. There are no restrictions on defense.

On December 5, 2023, the Lunkers signed Matt Rush, the first player to sign with an AL team.

== Season format ==
The inaugural season of The Arena League had a nine-week regular season schedule with each team receiving one bye week with playoffs to follow. The season ran from June to August 2024. In September, the AL released the 2024 schedule.

== Rules ==
- The field is traditional arena football size, measuring 50 yards long and 85 feet wide enclosed by padded walls.
- Teams had 15-player rosters with the game being played with six offensive players against six defensive players. The league followed a one-platoon system with offensive and defensive players playing both sides of the ball. There are no restrictions on defense.
- Play clock is reduced to 20 seconds from the spotting of the ball, as in the Canadian Football League.
- No offensive huddles are allowed unless a timeout is called.
- All offensive players are eligible receivers with three players initially lined up in an offensive line position. The quarterback cannot run the ball past the line of scrimmage.
- All players and coaches communicated with helmet communication systems that fans will be able to listen to in real time.
- Kickoffs were replaced with a quarterback throwoff, with an onside conversion option.
- All forms of kicking the ball are prohibited, including punts and field goals.
- There was only one on-field official to mark and set the ball and make penalty announcements. There were sky judges watching live video feeds to decide penalties in real time. Coaches and fans will have access to the referee interactions. After each game, fans can give feedback on the referees performance.

== Final standings ==
| Team | W | L | PCT | GB | PF | PA | STK |
|---|---|---|---|---|---|---|---|
| ^{(1)}Kansas City Goats | 7 | 1 | .875 | – | 581 | 405 | W3 |
| ^{(2)}Duluth Harbor Monsters | 5 | 3 | .625 | 2 | 390 | 354 | W3 |
| ^{(3)}Ozarks Lunkers | 3 | 5 | .375 | 4 | 379 | 446 | L3 |
| ^{(4)}Iowa Woo | 1 | 7 | .125 | 6 | 343 | 488 | L3 |

Legend
^{(1)} – Clinched 1 Seed
^{(2)} – Clinched 2 Seed
^{(3)} – Clinched 3 Seed
^{(4)} – Clinched 4 Seed

== Season schedule ==
The regular season schedule was released on September 6, 2023.

=== Regular season ===
==== Week 1 ====
| Date | Time | Away team | Result | | Home team | Stadium | Notes | Ref |
|---|---|---|---|---|---|---|---|---|
| June 1 | 7:05 p.m. CT | Duluth Harbor Monsters | 52 | 77 | Kansas City Goats | Municipal Arena | | |
| June 1 | 7:05 p.m. CT | Iowa Woo | 40 | 69 | Ozarks Lunkers | Wilson Logistics Arena | | |

==== Week 2 ====
| Date | Time | Away team | Result | | Home team | Stadium | Notes | Ref |
|---|---|---|---|---|---|---|---|---|
| June 8 | 2:05 p.m. CT | Kansas City Goats | 91 | 56 | Iowa Woo | The Hippodrome | | |

==== Week 3 ====
| Date | Time | Away team | Result | | Home team | Stadium | Notes | Ref |
|---|---|---|---|---|---|---|---|---|
| June 15 | 7:05 p.m. CT | Duluth Harbor Monsters | 44 | 38 | Ozarks Lunkers | Wilson Logistics Arena | | |
| June 15 | 7:05 p.m. CT | Iowa Woo | 38 | 58 | Kansas City Goats | Municipal Arena | | |

==== Week 4 ====
| Date | Time | Away team | Result | | Home team | Stadium | Notes | Ref |
|---|---|---|---|---|---|---|---|---|
| June 22 | 7:05 p.m. CT | Ozarks Lunkers | 52 | 46 | Iowa Woo | The Hippodrome | 2OT | |
| June 23 | 5:05 p.m. CT | Kansas City Goats | 58 | 57 | Duluth Harbor Monsters | DECC Arena | | |

==== Week 5 ====
| Date | Time | Away team | Result | | Home team | Stadium | Notes | Ref |
|---|---|---|---|---|---|---|---|---|
| June 29 | 7:05 p.m. CT | Ozarks Lunkers | 69 | 59 | Kansas City Goats | Wilson Logistics Arena | Game originally scheduled to be held at Municipal Arena | |
| June 29 | 7:05 p.m. CT | Iowa Woo | 41 | 22 | Duluth Harbor Monsters | DECC Arena | | |

==== Week 6 ====
| Date | Time | Away team | Result | | Home team | Stadium | Notes | Ref |
|---|---|---|---|---|---|---|---|---|
| July 6 | 7:05 p.m. CT | Duluth Harbor Monsters | 67 | 60 | Ozarks Lunkers | Wilson Logistics Arena | | |

==== Week 7 ====
| Date | Time | Away team | Result | | Home team | Stadium | Notes | Ref |
|---|---|---|---|---|---|---|---|---|
| July 13 | 7:05 p.m. CT | Kansas City Goats | 78 | 45 | Ozarks Lunkers | Wilson Logistics Arena | | |
| July 13 | 7:05 p.m. CT | Iowa Woo | 41 | 52 | Duluth Harbor Monsters | DECC Arena | | |

==== Week 8 ====
| Date | Time | Away team | Result | | Home team | Stadium | Notes | Ref |
|---|---|---|---|---|---|---|---|---|
| July 20 | 7:05 p.m. CT | Ozarks Lunkers | 18 | 51 | Duluth Harbor Monsters | DECC Arena | | |
| July 20 | 7:05 p.m. CT | Kansas City Goats | 99 | 60 | Iowa Woo | The Hippodrome | | |

==== Week 9 ====
| Date | Time | Away team | Result | | Home team | Stadium | Notes | Ref |
|---|---|---|---|---|---|---|---|---|
| July 27 | 7:05 p.m. CT | Duluth Harbor Monsters | 45 | 21 | Iowa Woo | The Hippodrome | | |
| July 27 | 7:05 p.m. CT | Ozarks Lunkers | 28 | 61 | Kansas City Goats | St. Pius X Football Stadium | Inside Out Game | |

=== Postseason ===
Semi-finals
August 3 – St. Pius X Football Stadium
1 Kansas City Goats | 58
4 Iowa Woo | 59
August 3 – DECC Arena
2 Duluth Harbor Monsters | 50
3 Ozarks Lunkers | 18

ArenaMania I
August 10 – DECC Arena
4 Iowa Woo | 44
2 Duluth Harbor Monsters | 46

==== Semi-finals ====
| Date | Time | Away team | Result | | Home team | Stadium | Notes | Ref |
|---|---|---|---|---|---|---|---|---|
| August 3 | 7:05 p.m. CT | Iowa Woo | 59 | 58 | Kansas City Goats | St. Pius X Football Stadium | | |
| August 3 | 7:05 p.m. CT | Ozarks Lunkers | 18 | 50 | Duluth Harbor Monsters | DECC Arena | | |

==== ArenaMania I ====
ArenaMania I–Game summary

| Quarter | 1 | 2 | 3 | 4 | Total |
|---|---|---|---|---|---|
| Iowa Woo | 6 | 12 | 0 | 26 | 44 |
| Duluth Harbor Monsters | 7 | 8 | 12 | 19 | 46 |

at DECC Arena, Duluth, Minnesota

- Date: August 10, 2024
- Game time: 7:05 p.m. CDT
- TV: YouTube

== Media ==
TAL team media deals
| Team | TV Station(s) | Radio Station(s) | Notes |
|---|---|---|---|
| Duluth Harbor Monsters | | Northland Fan 106.5 FM and 560AM | |
| Iowa Woo | KCRG-TV | | (Note: The team is partnered with KWWL as the exclusive news source.) |
| Kansas City Goats | | | |
| Ozarks Lunkers | KYTV | | |

== See also ==
- 2024 American Indoor Football season
- 2024 Arena Football League season
- 2024 Indoor Football League season
- 2024 National Arena League season
