= Minnesota Monsters (AF1) =

Arena football team

- Current season
Logo

General information
- Founded: 2023
- Headquartered: Saint Paul, Minnesota
- Colors: Black, Light Blue, Gold, Grey
- Mascot: Monty

Personnel
- Owner: Jacob Lambert
- CEO: Meadow Lemon
- General manager: Meadow Lemon
- Head coach: Daron Clark

Team history
- Duluth Harbor Monsters (2024–2025); Minnesota Monsters (2026-present)

Home fields
- DECC Arena (2024–2025); AMSOIL Arena (2026); Lee & Penny Anderson Arena (2027)

League / conference affiliations
- The Arena League (2024–2025); Arena Football One (2026–present)

Championships
- League championships: 2: 2024; 2025

The Minnesota Monsters are a professional arena football team that competes in Arena Football One (AF1). They were announced as the Duluth Harbor Monsters, one of the four inaugural teams of The Arena League (The AL or TAL) on April 5, 2023.

The Monsters were the second professional arena/indoor football team in the Duluth, Minnesota, area, the first being the Duluth-Superior Lumberjacks of the IFL. The Monsters played their games at AMSOIL Arena. After three seasons, the Monsters announced their move to the Minneapolis-St. Paul area in September 2026.

== History ==
Original logo (2024–2025)

Duluth was announced as the second team on April 5, 2023, to be a part of the inaugural season of The Arena League. The announcement was made at a press conference at the Garden Event Center in Duluth and included notable figures including the city mayor, Emily Larson, and the league commissioner, Tim Brown.

The DECC agreed to a 3-year lease for their older arena to be the home field for the team.

The Harbor Monsters concluded their first season with a record of 5 wins and 3 losses, earning them a spot to host a playoff game against the Ozarks Lunkers. Following their victory against the Lunkers, the Harbor Monsters advanced to host the championship game—the inaugural ArenaMania—where they faced off against the Iowa Woo. The coin toss for ArenaMania I was conducted by Duluth's newly elected mayor, Roger J. Reinert, and the halftime show featured a performance by the rock band, Palisade.

ArenaMania I was a thrilling contest, with the Harbor Monsters narrowly defeating the Iowa Woo 46–44 to win the inaugural Arena League championship. This historic win marked the Harbor Monsters as the first professional football team in Minnesota to claim a championship in the modern era.

On September 24, 2025, the Monsters announced that they would be joining Arena Football One and rebranding as the Minnesota Monsters, reviving a brand that was last used in indoor football in 1998 with the original Minnesota Monsters. The change coincided with the AL opening an investigation into head coach Tony O'Neil and GM Steven Walters for “actions that are detrimental to the integrity of The Arena League”. The AL had suspended O'Neil indefinitely just prior to the announcement of the team's move to AF1, and refused to acknowledge the legitimacy of the team's move or its sale, stating it did not have contact with the Monsters' new owner Jacob Lambert, would continue to recognize the previous owner, and does not allow teams to leave the AL as a matter of policy, stating all teams are bound to them "in perpetuity." As of September 2026, negotiations between the Monsters and the AL remained ongoing, as settlement discussions had recently collapsed.

Head coach Tony O'Neil resigned his position on October 23, 2025 to focus on his mental health, with former Cedar Rapids River Kings head coach Daron Clark assuming the position. Walters also left to join the NAL's Louisiana Rougaroux, citing disagreements with the incoming ownership. Ahead of their 2026 AF1 season, O'Neil then returned to the coaching staff as their defensive coordinator and assistant head coach. On December 18, the Monsters announced they were moving their games from the DECC Arena in favor of the complex's newer arena, AMSOIL Arena, for the 2026 season.

On September 4, 2026, the Monsters announced their intent to move to the Minneapolis-Saint Paul area, with Lambert citing the Twin Cities' much larger population and corporate base as reasons for the move. The Monsters will be playing in Lee & Penny Anderson Arena in Saint Paul for the 2027 season.

=== Team name and logos ===
On July 27, 2023, previous team owner, Brent LaBrie, announced the four finalists for the team name: Sasquatch, Norsemen, Harbor Monsters, and Lakers. The represented city name was also narrowed down to four finalists: Twin Ports, Minnesota, Lake Superior, and Duluth.

The Duluth Harbor Monsters’ team name and logo were officially unveiled on August 24, 2023, during a press conference at the DECC. The name originated from a "Name-the-Team" contest that garnered nearly 2,000 submissions. The final four names underwent a fan vote, resulting in an almost three-way tie between Sasquatch, Norsemen, and Harbor Monsters, with Harbor Monsters emerging victorious.

The team's logo, created by Ryan Foose of Foose Sports, draws inspiration from the mythical Mishipeshu, the legendary underwater panther of Lake Superior. The design incorporates blue and gold, paying tribute to Minnesota's state colors. Minnesota resident Ian Thorpe, who submitted the winning name, earned the honor of naming the team.

== Roster ==
On December 18, 2023, the Harbor Monsters signed Ja’Vonte Johnson, the franchise's first player.

The Harbor Monsters' first open tryouts were held on January 6, 2024. The team's second open tryouts were held on February 2, 2024.

On May 14, 2024, the Harbor Monsters signed Terrance Wenzel and Moe Strong, both former players for the Minnesota Myth of the Arena Football League. The pair joined the team following the dissolution of the Myth franchise.

On March 7, 2025, the Harbor Monsters signed Dan Williams III; he previously was on several NFL practice squads and most recently played for the Orlando Guardians of the XFL.

== Season-by-season ==
Season	GP	Record	PF	PA	Finish	Playoffs
2024	8	5–3	390	354	2nd of 4 TAL	W 50–18 vs. Ozarks Lunkers; W 46–44 vs. Iowa Woo; ARENAMANIA I CHAMPIONS

== Management ==
On July 27, 2023, Kramer Sports and Entertainment was announced as the owner of the team, led by Brent LaBrie, Dan Manor, Becca Ress, and Candyce Sorensen were announced as the team operations managers. LaBrie is the CEO of Hi-Tec Finishing and Kramer Service Group; his companies have sponsored NHRA drag racing, including racer Del Worsham.

On October 2, 2023, Steven Walters was named as the team's general manager. Walters previously served as Channel Marketing Manager at Fasetto, a technology start-up originally based in Superior, Wisconsin, where he oversaw both the marketing and sales teams under CMO Dan Bruck and CEO Coy Christmas.

Tony O'Neil was announced as the team's inaugural head coach on October 16, 2023. O'Neil previously was an assistant coach at Duluth Denfeld and also played professional arena football for three years.

Over the 2025 season, Kramer Service Group handed their ownership of the Duluth Harbor Monsters over to J&B Manufactured Homes, led by Jacob and Brianna Lambert, who would then move team operations from The Arena League to Arena Football One and rebrand the team as the Minnesota Monsters.
