= AMSOIL Arena =

Multipurpose arena in Duluth, Minnesota, US

Coordinates: 46°46′53″N 92°05′53″W

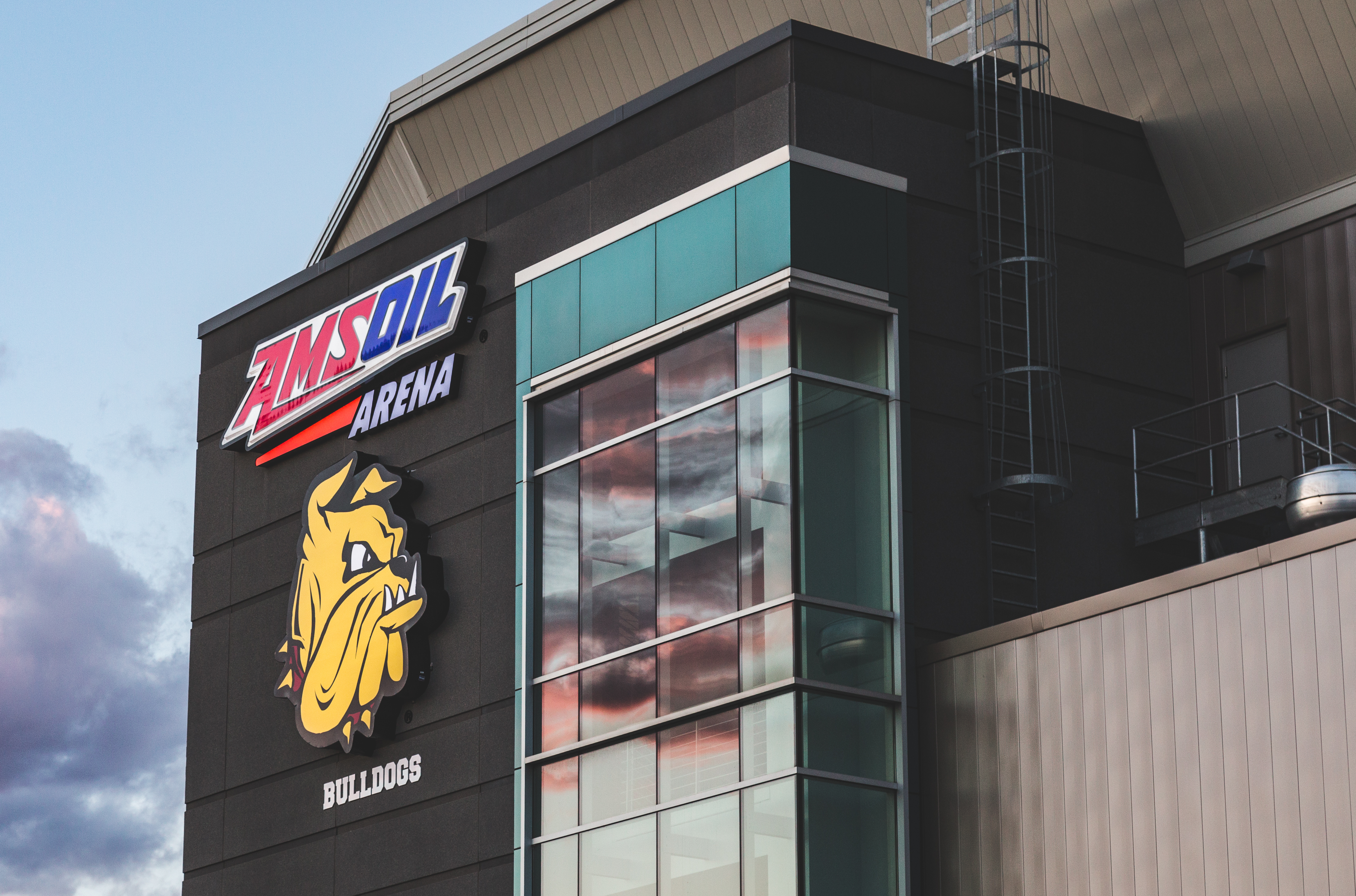
- AMSOIL Arena
- Interactive map of AMSOIL Arena
- Address: 350 Harbor Drive; Duluth, MN 55802
- Owner: Duluth Entertainment Convention Center
- Operator: Duluth Entertainment Convention Center
- Capacity: 6,726 (Hockey); 9,264 (Concerts)
- Surface: 85' x 200' (Ice)
- Record attendance: 8,372

Construction
- Groundbreaking: September 2008
- Opened: December 30, 2010
- Cost: $80 million ($118 million in 2025 dollars)
- Architects: Populous (formerly HOK Sport); SJA Architects
- General contractor: Mortenson/Thor

Tenants
- UMD Bulldogs men's hockey (NCHC) (2010–present); UMD Bulldogs women's hockey (WCHA) (2011–present); Minnesota Monsters (AF1) (2026)

Website
- decc.org/venue/amsoil-arena/

AMSOIL Arena is a multipurpose arena in Duluth, Minnesota, home to the UMD Men's and UMD Women's hockey teams. It opened in 2010, replacing the DECC Arena on the waterfront near Duluth's landmark Aerial Lift Bridge.

Naming rights for 20 years were purchased by AMSOIL, a corporation based in Superior, Wisconsin, for $6 million, one-third up front.

The facility cost nearly $80 million; about half ($38 million) paid by the State of Minnesota through a 2008 bond bill, another 27% (about $21.6 million) by a voter-approved city food-and-beverage tax increase, 12% (about $9.6 million) by UMD, and the last 11% (about $8.8 million) by the DECC. Construction ran from September 2008 to December 2010, and included a 475-space parking garage with a skywalk connecting it to the arena.

The first event held at the arena was on December 30, 2010. UMD men's hockey team lost 0–5 to North Dakota before a crowd of 6,764, tied for the team's highest home attendance that season.

In their first season in the arena, the UMD men's hockey team won the NCAA Men's Ice Hockey Championship. In 2012, the arena hosted the 2012 NCAA Division I Women's Ice Hockey Tournament, in which Minnesota beat Wisconsin, 4–2.

The arena's attendance record was set on June 20, 2018, during a President Donald Trump rally, which drew 8,372 people. The attendance record for a sporting event was set on January 25, 2020, when UMD men's hockey team lost to their rival, North Dakota, 2–3 in front of 7,711 fans.

== Comparison to DECC Arena ==
Characteristic	DECC Arena	AMSOIL Arena
Hockey seating	5,100	6,726
Concessions	28	35 + 6 portable
Club space	0 sq. ft.	2000 sq. ft.
Suites	0	16
Leg room between rows	31"	34" lower, 33" upper
Elevators	1	3
Scoreboard	10' x 12'	15' x 20'
Ice sheet	85' x 190'	85' x 200'

== Arena Usage ==
=== Hockey ===
AMSOIL Arena is primarily used as a hockey arena home to the University of Minnesota-Duluth's men's and women's hockey teams. The arena hosted the 2012 NCAA Division I Women's Ice Hockey Tournament and the 2023 NCAA Division I Women's Ice Hockey Tournament.

AMSOIL Arena hosted the 2017 Ice Breaker Tournament, held October 6–7th 2017. Four teams participated in the tournament. Michigan Tech defeated Union College 6–3 and University of Minnesota Duluth defeated University of Minnesota 4–3 in overtime in the tournament's first round. In the final round, University of Minnesota Duluth fell to tournament champion Michigan Tech 4–3, while in the consolation game the University of Minnesota beat Union College 2–0.

Other hockey events include preseason practices for the National Hockey League's Minnesota Wild-open to the public, Minnesota State High School League section 7A and 7AA tournament games, as well as a high-school all-star game.

=== Basketball ===
AMSOIL Arena hosted the Harlem Globetrotters in 2012, 2014, 2016, 2017, 2018, and 2019, for which Minnesota Lynx's (WNBA) court has been brought up from Minneapolis, Minnesota.

=== Arena Football ===
After two seasons as the Duluth Harbor Monsters with The Arena League, the team rebranded as the Minnesota Monsters as they moved operations to Arena Football One. The team has even moved games from the DECC Arena to AMSOIL Arena for the 2026 season before relocation to Minneapolis-St. Paul.

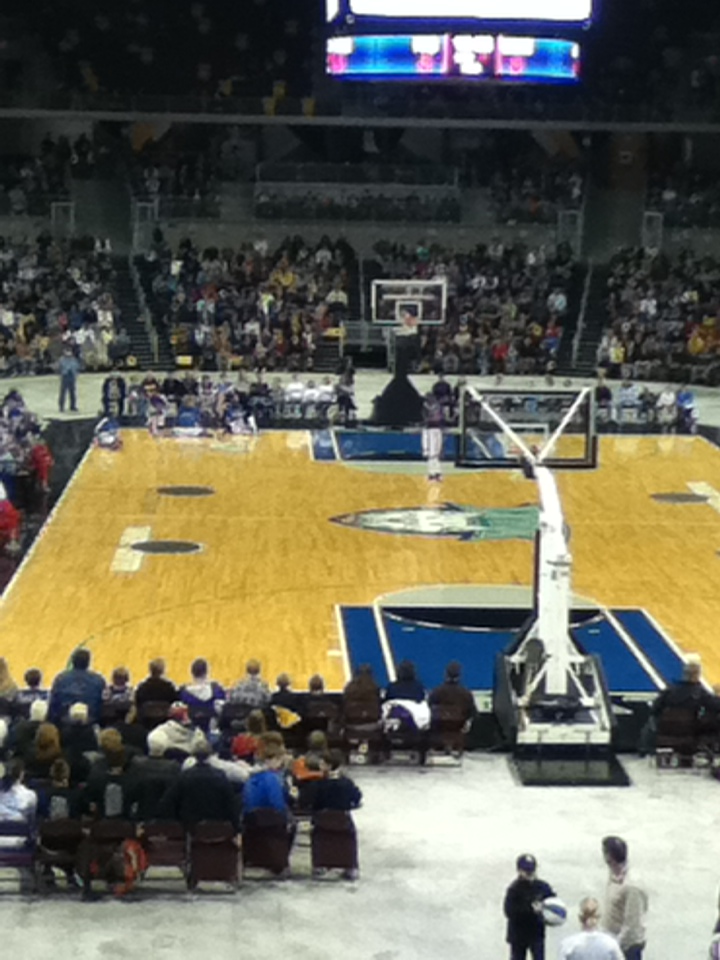
Globetrotters Basketball Game on April 1, 2011

=== Events ===
AMSOIL Arena has held many different types of events, from comedians Jeff Dunham and Jim Gaffigan to Cirque du Soleil. The local AAD Shrine holds its annual AAD Shrine Circus fundraiser at the arena each April. The arena also hosts concerts. The Duluth Superior Symphony Orchestra had the first non-sporting event held at the arena, "Cirque de la Symphonie on Ice", on December 31, 2010, a day after the facility opened. It can also be converted to host dinners and conventions. On June 20, 2018, President Donald Trump held a rally in the arena that saw a record breaking attendance of 8,372.

List of concerts
Date	Main Artist	Other artists	Tour Name	Attendance	Revenue	Notes
May 6, 2011	Elton John		Greatest Hits Live Tour	—N/a	—N/a	
June 25, 2011	Michael Buble	Naturally 7	Crazy Love Tour	5,368 / 5,368	$414,132	
December 7, 2011	Avenged Sevenfold	Hollywood Undead; Asking Alexandria; Black Veil Brides	The Buried Alive Tour	—N/a	—N/a	
April 18, 2012	Trans-Siberian Orchestra		Beethoven's Last Night Tour 2012	—N/a	—N/a	
March 22, 2013	Jason Aldean	Jake Owen; Thomas Rhett	2013 Night Train Tour	—N/a	—N/a	
February 1, 2014	Justin Moore	Randy Houser; Josh Thompson	Off The Beaten Path Tour	—N/a	—N/a	
February 15, 2014	TobyMac	Brandon Heath; Matt Maher; Mandisa; Matthew West	Hits Deep Tour	—N/a	—N/a	
April 6, 2014	Casting Crowns	Laura Story; For King & Country	Thrive Tour	—N/a	—N/a	
April 11, 2014	Ludacris	Two-9; DJ Sidereal		—N/a	—N/a	
March 26, 2015	Little Big Town	Chris Stapleton	The Painkiller Tour	—N/a	—N/a	
April 24, 2015	Juicy J	Brother Ali; GRRRL PRTY; DJ Shannon Blowtorch		—N/a	—N/a	
December 3, 2015	Chris Young	Eric Paslay; Clare Dunn	I'm Comin' Over Tour	—N/a	—N/a	
June 1, 2016	James Taylor			—N/a	—N/a	
August 19, 2016	Kiss	Caleb Johnson	Freedom to Rock Tour	5,157 / 5,883	$406,092	
August 6, 2016	The Beach Boys	The Temptations	Surf & Soul Tour	—N/a	—N/a	DECC's 50th Anniversary Concert
November 6, 2016	Keith Urban	Maren Morris	ripCORD World Tour 2016	—N/a	—N/a	
November 26, 2016	Bryan Adams		Get Up Tour	—N/a	—N/a	
March 4, 2017	Thomas Rhett	Kelsea Ballerini; Russell Dickerson; Ryan Hurd	Home Team Tour 2017	—N/a	—N/a	
April 29, 2017	Brantley Gilbert	Luke Combs; Brian Davis	The Devil Don't Sleep Tour	—N/a	—N/a	
August 3, 2017	Chris Stapleton	Margo Price; Brent Cobb	All-American Road Show Tour	—N/a	—N/a	
March 13, 2018	Styx	REO Speedwagon; Don Felder		—N/a	—N/a	
March 16, 2018	Little Big Town	Kacey Musgraves; Midland	The Breakers Tour	—N/a	—N/a	
November 7, 2018	Alabama	Whiskey Trail	The Hits Tour 2018	—N/a	—N/a	Rescheduled from September 30, 2018
December 15, 2018	Old Dominion	High Valley	Happy Endings World Tour	—N/a	—N/a	
March 7, 2019	Dierks Bentley	Jon Pardi; Tenille Townes; Hot Country Knights	Burning Man Tour	—N/a	—N/a	
April 11, 2019	Luke Combs	LANCO; Jameson Rodgers	Beer Never Broke My Heart Tour	—N/a	—N/a	
May 9, 2019	Kelsea Ballerini	Brett Young; Brandon Ratcliff	The Miss Me More Tour	—N/a	—N/a	
May 15, 2019	Chicago		—N/a	—N/a	—N/a	
October 19, 2019	Chris Young	Eli Young Band; Matt Stell	Raised on Country Tour	—N/a	—N/a	
April 2, 2022	Granger Smith	LANCO; Lainey Wilson	—N/a	—N/a	—N/a	
April 21, 2022	MercyMe	Rend Collective; Andrew Ripp	—N/a	—N/a	—N/a	
July 10, 2022	Travis Tritt	Derek Jones; Maygen and the Birdwatcher	—N/a	—N/a	—N/a	
September 3, 2022	Styx	REO Speedwagon; Loverboy	—N/a	—N/a	—N/a	
February 18, 2023	Old Dominion	Frank Ray; Kassi Ashton; Greylan James	No Bad Vibes Tour	—N/a	—N/a	
April 21, 2023	Kevin Gates	Waka Flocka Flame; Kelly Iris; Baby Shel	—N/a	—N/a	—N/a	
June 20, 2023	Doobie Brothers	Michael McDonald	—N/a	—N/a	—N/a	
July 23, 2023	Whiskey Myers	Brent Cobb	2023 Tour	—N/a	—N/a	
October 17, 2023	Dropkick Murphys	The Interrupters; Jesse Ahern	Fall Tour 2023	—N/a	—N/a	
March 22, 2024	Sam Hunt	Brett Young; Lily Rose	—N/a	—N/a	—N/a	
April 19, 2024	Gucci Mane	Prof; DJ Sophia Eris	—N/a	—N/a	—N/a	
September 27, 2024	Foreigner	Lita Ford	Foreigner Farewell Tour	—N/a	—N/a	

== Awards ==
In 2013, Stadium Journey rated AMSOIL Arena as the best stadium experience in the United States and Canada. In 2014 and 2015, Stadium Journey rated AMSOIL Arena as the second best stadium experience in the United States and Canada, behind Oriole Park at Camden Yards home to Major League Baseball's Baltimore Orioles.

AMSOIL Arena was ranked the best college hockey arena by Stadium Journey in 2014 and 2015.

The Wall Street Journal named AMSOIL Arena one of its 10 "Golden Zamboni" winners for its uniqueness among the nation's college hockey venues.

Preceded by DECC Arena	Home of the UMD Bulldogs Men's Hockey; 2010–present	Succeeded by Current
Preceded by DECC Arena	Home of the UMD Bulldogs Women's Hockey; 2011–present	Succeeded by Current
Preceded by Erie Insurance Arena	Host of the NCAA Women's DI Ice Hockey Tournament; 2012	Succeeded by Ridder Arena
Preceded by Pegula Ice Arena	Host of the NCAA Women's DI Ice Hockey Tournament; 2023	Succeeded by Whittemore Center
