= Mook Zimmerman =

American football coach (born 1988)

Iowa Woo
- Title: Head coach

Personal information
- Born: January 20, 1988 (age 38); Waterbury, Connecticut, U.S.
- Listed height: 6 ft 2 in (1.88 m)
- Listed weight: 240 lb (109 kg)

Career information
- High school: Sacred Heart (CT)
- College: Sacred Heart (2006–2009) Anna Maria (2010)
- NFL draft: 2011: undrafted

Career history

Playing
- Huntington Hammer (2011); Miami Sting; Brazil (2013); America Bulls Potiguares

Coaching
- Sacred Heart HS (CT) (2012–2015) Defensive coordinator; Buffalo Lightning (2016) Head coach; Richmond/West Virginia Roughriders (2017–2019) Head coach; Iowa Barnstormers (2022) Assistant head coach/DL coach; Massachusetts Pirates (2023) LB/DL coach; Iowa Woo (2024) Head coach

Awards and highlights
- APF champion (2017); AAL champion (2019); 2017 APF Coach of the Year; 2019 AAL Coach of the Year

Head coaching record
- Regular season: 30–8 (.789)
- Postseason: 6-2 (.750)
- Career: 36-10 (.783)

LaRonn "Mook" Zimmerman (born January 20, 1988), is an American football coach. He is currently the head coach of the Iowa Woo in The Arena League (The AL or TAL).

== College years ==
=== Anna Maria ===
Zimmerman played one season at Anna Maria (NCAA DIII) and recorded 2 tackles and 1 fumble recovery returned for a touchdown over two games.

== Professional playing career ==
Zimmerman played seven years of professional arena football in South America, North America, and Europe.

On September 23, 2011, Zimmerman was signed by the Huntington Hammer of the UIFL.

== Coaching career ==
=== Buffalo Lightning ===
Zimmerman was the head coach of the Buffalo Lightning of the Supreme Indoor Football during the 2016 season. The league folded before it began play; however, the Lightning played two games, independently, and won both.

=== Richmond Roughriders/West Virginia Roughriders ===
Zimmerman led the Roughriders to an undefeated season and championship in 2017, his first season with the team. The next season the Roughriders lost the championship. In 2019, Zimmerman led the Roughriders to another undefeated season and league championship.

Zimmerman retired from football in 2020.

=== Iowa Barnstormers ===
On January 3, 2022, the Iowa Barnstormers announced Zimmerman as the assistant head coach and defensive line coach.

=== Massachusetts Pirates ===
On October 24, 2022, Zimmerman signed with the IFL's Massachusetts Pirates as a linebackers and defensive lineman coach.

=== Tucson Sugar Skulls ===
On January 10, 2024, Zimmerman was announced as the defensive line coach part of the 2024 coaching staff for the IFL's Tucson Sugar Skulls.

=== Iowa Woo ===
On February 29, 2024, Zimmerman was named the inaugural head coach of the Iowa Woo in the Arena League.

On January 14, 2025, Zimmerman had announced his resignation as head coach of the Woo.

=== Head coaching record ===
| League | Team | Year | Regular season | | | | Postseason | | | |
| League | Team | Year | Won | Lost | Ties | Win % | Won | Lost | Win % | Result |
|---|---|---|---|---|---|---|---|---|---|---|
| IND | Buffalo Lightning | 2016 | 2 | 0 | 0 | 1.000 | — | — | — | — |
| APF | Richmond Roughriders | 2017 | 7 | 0 | 0 | 1.000 | 1 | 0 | 1.000 | APF Champions |
| AAL | West Virginia Roughriders | 2018 | 10 | 1 | 0 | .909 | 1 | 1 | .500 | Lost AAL Championship |
| AAL | West Virginia Roughriders | 2019 | 10 | 0 | 0 | 1.000 | 3 | 0 | 1.000 | AAL Champions |
| TAL | Iowa Woo | 2024 | 1 | 7 | 0 | .125 | 1 | 1 | .500 | Lost ArenaMania I |
| Total | | | 30 | 8 | 0 | .789 | 6 | 2 | .750 | |
