= Nebraska Siege =

Nebraska Indoor Football Team

General information
- Founded: 2025
- Inaugural season: 2026
- Stadium: Heartland Events Center
- Headquartered: Grand Island, Nebraska
- Colors: Black, Crimson, Cream, and Olive Drab
- Website: https://nebraskasiege.com/

Personnel
- General manager: Matthew Caward
- Head coach: Dominic Bramante

The Nebraska Siege are an indoor football team based in Grand Island, Nebraska. Founded in 2026, the Siege are members of The Arena League (The AL or TAL) and play their home games at the Heartland Events Center. After the Nebraska Danger folded following the 2019 season, there was no indoor football until 2025, when a press conference announced that indoor football would return for the 2026 season. The Siege name was chosen after 800 submissions were submitted through a team naming contest. Matthew Caward was named the General Manager of the Siege and Dominic Bramante was named the first head coach.

After its formation, the Siege had a 78-0 preseason win against the Minneapolis Warhawks. They had an undefeated record through their first five games and earned a playoff appearance. At the conclusion of its first season, they had a record of 7-2; they lost twice against the St. Joseph Goats in the playoffs. The Goats won ArenaMania III.
