= Tony O'Neil =

American football coach (born 1985)

Profile
- Position: defensive end

Personal information
- Born: April 9, 1985 (age 41); Miami, Florida, U.S.
- Listed height: 6 ft 3 in (1.91 m)
- Listed weight: 265 lb (120 kg)

Career information
- High school: Arundel (Gambrills, MD)
- College: North Dakota (2007); St. Scholastica (2008)
- NFL draft: 2009: undrafted

Career history

Playing
- La Crosse Spartans (2010–2011); Philadelphia Soul (2012)

Coaching
- Denfeld HS (MN) (2022–2023) Offensive line/defensive line coach; Duluth Harbor Monsters (2024–2025) Head coach

Awards and highlights
- As a head coach: 2× TAL Champion (ArenaMania I, Arenamania II)

Career AFL statistics
- Tackles: 0
- Sacks: 0

Head coaching record
- Regular season: 5–3 (.625)
- Postseason: 2–0 (1.000)
- Career: 7–3 (.700)

Antonio Mauricio O'Neil (born April 9, 1985) is an American football coach. He is currently an assistant coach at Denfeld High School and the inaugural and former head coach of the Duluth Harbor Monsters in The Arena League (The AL or TAL), which began in 2024. O'Neil is also a former arena football player.

== Early life ==
Tony was born in Miami and lived in Jamaica for a few years, where his grandparents had a restaurant.

== College years ==
=== North Dakota ===
O'Neil attended the University of North Dakota in 2007 and studied mass communication.

=== St. Scholastica ===
O'Neil played his final season of college football eligibility at the College of St. Scholastica, an NCAA Division III school in Duluth, Minnesota. He appeared in four games making 7 tackles and 1 fumble recovery.

== Professional playing career ==
O'Neil played three seasons of arena football, two with the La Crosse Spartans of the IFL and one with the Philadelphia Soul in the AFL.

== Coaching career ==
=== Denfeld High School ===
O'Neil joined the Denfeld staff in 2022 as the offensive and defensive line coach.

=== Duluth Harbor Monsters ===
On October 16, 2023, O'Neil was named as the inaugural head coach of the Duluth Harbor Monsters in the Arena League. After two championships and shortly after the team's move to Arena Football One, coach O'Neil announced he was stepping down to "focus on his mental health".

=== Head coaching record ===
League	Team	Year	Regular season				Postseason			
League	Team	Year	Won	Lost	Ties	Win %	Won	Lost	Win %	Result
TAL	Duluth Harbor Monsters	2024	5	3	0	.625	2	0	1.000	Won ArenaMania I
Total			5	3	0	.625	2	0	1.000	

== Personal life ==
O'Neil owns and manages a local restaurant in Duluth. He is also a certified chef with the American Culinary Federation.

O'Neil has an associate degree in liberal arts and a bachelor's degree in communication.
