= Arena League (disambiguation) =

The Arena Football League was an American arena football league which played from 1987 to 2019.

Arena League may also refer to:

- Arena Football League (2024)
- National Arena League, from 2017
- American Arena League, from 2018
- The Arena League, from 2024
- Arena Football One (2025)
