= The Hippodrome =

Arena in Waterloo, IA

Coordinates: 42°30′35″N 92°22′25″W

- Interactive map of The Hippodrome
- Former names: Hippodrome (1919–1965); McElroy Auditorium (1965–2018)
- Address: 257 Ansborough Ave; Waterloo, IA 50701
- Owner: National Cattle Congress
- Operator: National Cattle Congress
- Capacity: 5,155; 7,000 (maximum)
- Surface: 210' x 85' (indoor football)

Construction
- Opened: 1919
- Renovated: 1936

Tenants
- Waterloo Hawks (NBL/NBA/NPBL) (1948–1951); Waterloo Black Hawks (USHL) (1962–1969, 1970–1994); Iowa Stars (CHL) (1969–1970); Iowa Woo (TAL) (2024–2025)

Website
- nationalcattlecongress.com/the-hippodrome/

The Hippodrome, formerly known as the McElroy Auditorium, is a 5,155 permanent seat multipurpose arena located in Waterloo, Iowa. The auditorium was built in 1919 and renovated in 1936, when the roof was raised, floor was excavated and additional seating was added.

The arena was named in honor of R. J. McElroy beginning around 1965, after the Waterloo broadcaster and philanthropist unexpectedly died. In 2018, the name of the venue was officially changed back to The Hippodrome.

== Arena Design ==
The auditorium has been in continuous operation since 1919, making it one of the oldest arenas in the country. The arena contains 234 classic arena style box seats and a 4,000-square-foot (370 m^{2}) art deco lobby. With chairs placed on the arena floor, the arena holds up to 7,000 seated for concerts depending on stage configuration. There are four large concession areas and a 150-seat restaurant. For concerts, remote beverage stations are added along with an old milk truck that has been restored into a "hot rod" style beer truck with 8 tappers. There are 6 large modern dressing rooms and 5 large box office windows.

== Usage ==
=== National Cattle Congress ===
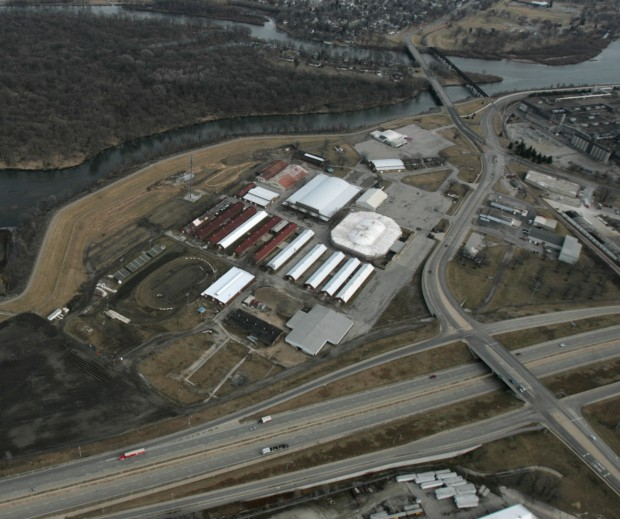
Aerial view of the National Cattle Congress area; The Hippodrome is the oval-shaped building.

The arena style auditorium, part of the National Cattle Congress complex, is used for trade shows, concerts, conventions, livestock shows, rodeos, meetings, sporting events and more.

=== Sports ===
The Hippodrome hosted the Waterloo Hawks of the NBL, NBA, and NPBL from 1948 to 1951. The Waterloo Hawks are the only Big Four major league team to have been based in Iowa.

The Hippodrome also housed the USHL's Waterloo Black Hawks from their inception in 1962 until Young Arena opened in 1994, and the Iowa Stars of the Central Professional Hockey League during the 1969–70 season. The Hippodrome hosted the Iowa Woo team of The Arena League during the 2024 and 2025 seasons, with the team moving to the UNI-Dome in 2026.

=== As a concert venue ===
The roof design and construction materials along with the room design make the venue well-suited for concerts acoustically. It has hosted a variety of acts such as the Glenn Miller Orchestra, Red Skelton, Buddy Holly, Johnny Cash, Kiss, Aerosmith, The Beach Boys, Rush, Garth Brooks, Miranda Lambert, Blake Shelton, Destiny's Child, Jason Aldean, Roy Clark, Rob Zombie, Disturbed, Dierks Bentley, Nelly and Gym Class Heroes among many others in the past years.

=== Naming confusion ===
When the NBA played in Waterloo the arena is often referred to as McElroy Auditorium. The confusion stems from an NBA publication from the 1960s which erroneously listed the current name of the arena and not its historical name.

== Photo gallery ==
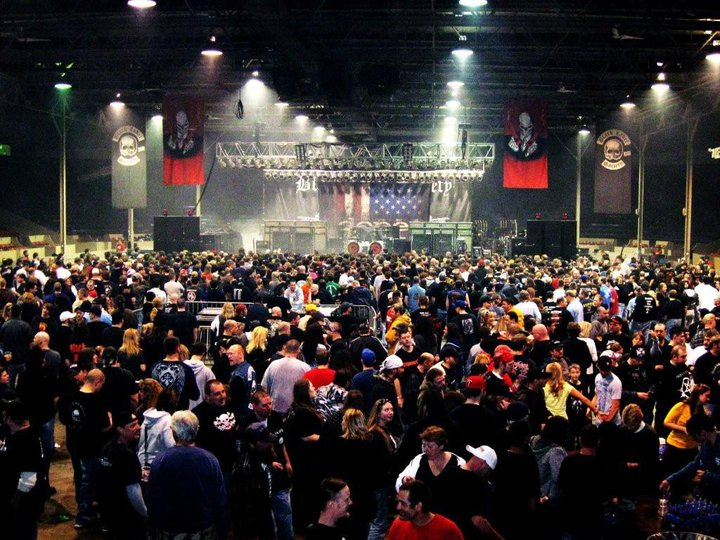
A view from the rear of the auditorium looking towards the stage

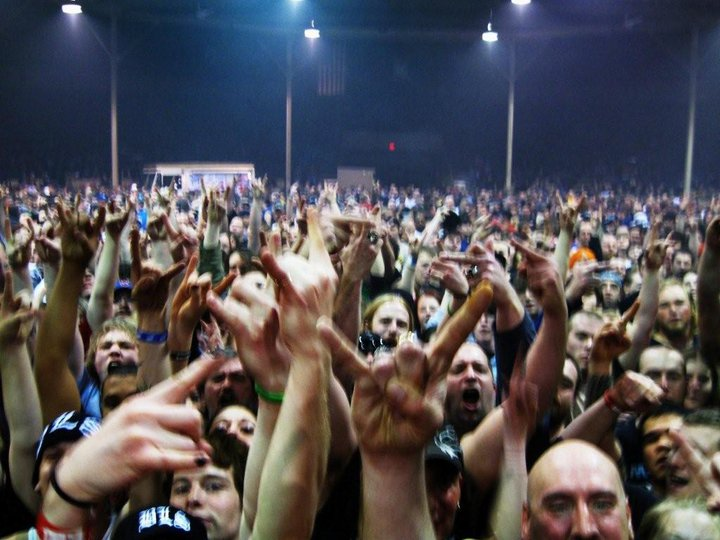
A view from the stage looking towards the rear

Preceded by none	Home of the Waterloo Hawks; 1948-1951	Succeeded by none
Preceded by none	Home of the Waterloo Black Hawks; 1962-1994	Succeeded by Young Arena
Preceded by Mid-South Coliseum (Memphis, TN); Memphis South Stars	Home of the Iowa Stars; 1969-1970	Succeeded by none
Preceded by none	Home of the Iowa Woo; 2024	Succeeded by Current
