= Sonnentag Event Center =

Multipurpose arena in Eau Claire, Wisconsin

The Sonnentag Center
- The Sonnentag
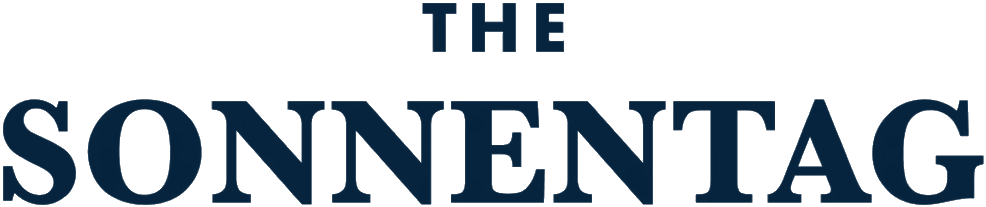
- Interactive map of The Sonnentag Center
- Address: 1061 Menomonie Street; Eau Claire, WI 54703; United States
- Coordinates: 44°47′59″N 91°31′21″W
- Owner: Eau Claire Community Complex
- Operator: CENTERS
- Capacity: 5,000; 3,250 (indoor football)
- Type: Arena
- Surface: 210'x85' (indoor football)
- Current use: Basketball; Volleyball; Concerts

Construction
- Groundbreaking: Spring 2022
- Opened: July 15, 2024; 2 years ago
- Cost: $110 million
- Project manager: Ayres Associates
- General contractors: Market & Johnson

Tenants
- UWEC Blugolds (NCAA) teams: basketball, volleyball (2024-present); Eau Claire Axemen (TAL) (2025–present)

Website
- thesonnentag.com

The Sonnentag Center is a multipurpose arena in Eau Claire, Wisconsin located near the University of Wisconsin–Eau Claire's campus. The stadium opened in 2024. The stadium replaced the Zorn Arena, which is planned to be demolished.

Sporting events hosted by the Sonnentag include basketball and volleyball games. Apart from that, it is used for concerts.

== History ==
In 2014, alumni John and Carolyn Sonnentag gave more than 25 acres of land along the Chippewa River to the UW-Eau Claire Foundation. The UW-Eau Claire Foundation also accepted a $70 million gift from the Sonnentags and their family foundation in 2021. These gifts were intended to help the university replace Zorn Arena and provide value to the community.

On July 9, 2021, the University of Wisconsin System Board of Regents authorized UWEC to lease space at the arena for 20 years with a 10-year renewal option.

== Usage ==
=== Sports ===
The stadium will host the Eau Claire Axemen in The Arena League, expected to begin in June 2025. The league agreed to a three-year lease with the stadium. The Sonnentag is also used by the University of Wisconsin–Eau Claire Blugolds as home venue for its basketball and volleyball teams.

=== Other events ===
The arena is able to accommodate all types of events. The facility will be 172,502 square feet and designed for trade shows, concerts, and competitions.

== John and Carolyn Sonnentag Fieldhouse ==
The John and Carolyn Sonnetag Fieldhouse is an 81,300 square-foot space that features a 120-yard artificially turfed field.
