= 1969–70 CHL season =

American ice hockey season

The 1969–70 CHL season was the seventh season of the Central Hockey League, a North American minor professional league. Seven teams participated in the regular season, and the Omaha Knights won the league title.

== Regular season ==
Central Hockey League	GP	W	L	OTL	GF	GA	Pts
Omaha Knights	72	36	26	10	247	212	82
Iowa Stars	72	35	26	11	252	232	81
Tulsa Oilers	72	35	27	10	230	202	80
Fort Worth Wings	72	31	25	16	217	206	78
Dallas Black Hawks	72	30	37	5	236	241	65
Oklahoma City Blazers	72	26	39	7	233	291	59
Kansas City Blues	72	24	37	11	228	259	59

== Playoffs ==
Semifinals
1	Omaha Knights	4
4	Fort Worth Wings	3
2	Iowa Stars	4
3	Tulsa Oilers	2

Final
1	Omaha Knights	4
2	Iowa Stars	1
