= Eau Claire Axemen =

Arena football team

- Current season
Logo

General information
- Founded: 2024
- Headquartered: Sonnentag Event Center in Eau Claire, Wisconsin
- Colors: Dark Green, Copper, Light Grey, Tan
- AxemenFootball.com

Personnel
- Owner: The Arena League
- General manager: Dietrich Schwoerer
- Head coach: Tae Brooks

Team history
- Eau Claire Jammers (2024); Eau Claire Log Jammers (2024, 18 days); Eau Claire Axemen (2025-present)

Home fields
- Sonnentag Event Center (2025–present)

League / conference affiliations
- The Arena League (2025–)

The Eau Claire Axemen are an indoor American football team of The Arena League (The AL or TAL). Based in Eau Claire, Wisconsin, the Axemen play their home games at the Sonnentag Event Center.

The Axemen are the first arena/indoor football team based in Eau Claire.

Original logo for the then-Jammers. Was changed to Log Jammers before the 2025 schedule release on 10/10/24 and later changed again to Axemen.

== History ==
After Eau Claire was consistently among the top choices in fan polls for potential expansion candidates, the Arena League officially announced Eau Claire as the home of their sixth team and second 2025 expansion team on May 17, 2024.

Following a name-the-team contest, the Jammers name, logo and color scheme were announced on July 18, 2024, at their namesake Country Jam USA. On October 10, 2024, the team was briefly renamed the Log Jammers for 18 days before changing their name again to the Axemen on October 28.

On May 20, 2025, the AL staff announced that they are taking over the operations of the Axemen.
