= Iowa Stars (1969–70) =

- City: Waterloo, Iowa
- League: Central Hockey League
- Founded: 1962
- Folded: 2001
- Home arena: The Hippodrome

Franchise history
- 1962–1969: Waterloo Black Hawks
- 1969–1970: Iowa Stars
- 1970–1980: Waterloo Black Hawks
- 1980–2001: Dubuque Fighting Saints

The Iowa Stars were a hockey team that played in the Central Hockey League for the 1969–70 CHL season. After the Memphis South Stars folded in 1969, the Minnesota North Stars reached an agreement with the Waterloo Black Hawks to have them become Minnesota's primary affiliate for one season. The team was renamed as the 'Iowa Stars' and played in the Central Hockey League for the season. After the year, the franchise returned to the United States Hockey League as the Black Hawks while the North Stars moved their affiliation elsewhere. They Stars played their home games at The Hippodrome in Waterloo, Iowa.
