= Boegel and Hine Flour Mill-Wommack Mill =

- U.S. National Register of Historic Places
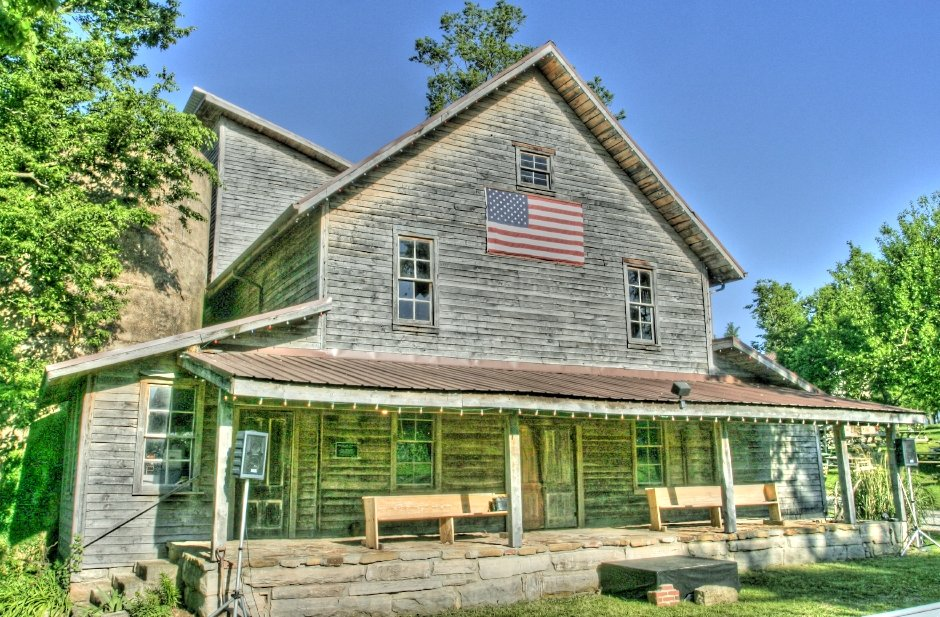
- Boegel and Hine Flour Mill-Wommack Mill in 2009

- Location within Missouri Location within the United States
- Location: E side of S. Main St., S of intersection with MO State Highway CC, Fair Grove, Missouri
- Coordinates: 37°22′59″N 93°9′1″W
- Area: 2 acres (0.81 ha)
- Built: 1883
- Built by: Hine, Joseph; Boegel, John
- NRHP reference No.: 86003140
- Added to NRHP: November 6, 1986

Boegel and Hine Flour Mill-Wommack Mill, also known as Grove Mill, is a historic grist mill complex located at Fair Grove, Greene County, Missouri. The mill was built in 1883, and is a 2 1/2-story, heavy timber frame building sided with vertical boards. Adjacent to the building are paired cylindrical grain storage silos of creek gravel concrete construction. The mill continued to operate until 1969.

It was listed on the National Register of Historic Places in 1986.
