= Fair Grove High School =

Public school in Missouri, United States

Location
- 132 North Main Street; Fair Grove, Missouri 65648; United States
- Coordinates: 37°23′17″N 93°08′56″W

Information
- Type: K-12
- School district: R-X
- Superintendent: Christian Overstreet
- Principal: Randie Roepke
- Teaching staff: 25.06 (on an FTE basis)
- Grades: 9-12
- Enrollment: 373 (2024-2025)
- Student to teacher ratio: 14.88
- Colors: Purple and white
- Athletics conference: Mid Lakes Conference
- Nickname: Eagles
- Website: www.fairgroveschools.net/o/fghs

Fair Grove High School is a public high school serving 367 students in grades 9–12 located in Fair Grove, Missouri. The current principal is Randie Roepke, and the Assistant Principal is Damon Seiger. 96.5% of the students who attend the school are white, while 0.3% are black, 1.6% are Hispanic and 1.6% are Asian.

The high school suffered damage from a derecho on May 8, 2009, part of the May 2009 Southern Midwest derecho system.

== Championships ==
=== Scholar Bowl ===
2021 Class 3 State Champions

2023 Class 4 State Champions

2023 SSNCT National Champions

=== Volleyball ===
2023 Class 2 State Champions

2024 Class 2 State Champions

=== Girls Basketball ===
2023 Class 3 State Champions

2024 Class 3 State Champions

2025 Class 3 State Champions

== Notable alumni ==
- Tony Roper (class of 1983), NASCAR driver
- Charity (Shira) Elliott (class of 1987), college basketball coach
- Jason Hart (class of 1995), former Major League Baseball player
- Cam Bruffett (class of 2010), football head coach
