= Fair Grove, Missouri =

- City
- Nickname: "The Old Mill Town"
- Motto: "Laissez-faire"
- Interactive map of Fair Grove, Missouri
- Coordinates: 37°22′52″N 93°9′4″W
- Country: United States
- State: Missouri
- County: Greene

Government
  - Mayor: Vacant

Area
  - Total: 3.19 sq mi (8.25 km^{2})
  - Land: 3.19 sq mi (8.25 km^{2})
  - Water: 0 sq mi (0.00 km^{2})
- Elevation: 1,211 ft (369 m)

Population (2020)
  - Total: 1,582
  - Density: 496.4/sq mi (191.67/km^{2})
- Time zone: UTC-6 (Central (CST))
  - Summer (DST): UTC-5 (CDT)
- ZIP code: 65648
- Area code: 417
- FIPS code: 29-23338
- GNIS feature ID: 0717724
- Website: http://fairgrove.org

Fair Grove is a city in Greene County, Missouri, United States. The population was 1,582 at the 2020 census. It is part of the Springfield, Missouri Metropolitan Statistical Area.

== History ==
A post office called Fair Grove has been in operation since 1856. The community was named for a grove of trees near the original town site that reminded the early settlers of Fairgrove, North Carolina, from where they migrated.

The Boegel and Hine Flour Mill-Wommack Mill was listed on the National Register of Historic Places in 1986.

== Geography ==
Fair Grove is located at 37°22′52″N 93°9′4″W (37.380992, -93.150996). Fair Grove is located approximately 14 miles (23 km) north of Springfield on U.S. Route 65.

According to the United States Census Bureau, the city has a total area of 3.18 square miles (8.24 km^{2}), all land.

== Demographics ==
Historical population
Census	Pop.	Note	%±
1880	72		—
1970	431		—
1980	863		100.2%
1990	919		6.5%
2000	1,107		20.5%
2010	1,393		25.8%
2020	1,582		13.6%
U.S. Decennial Census

=== 2020 census ===
As of the 2020 census, Fair Grove had a population of 1,582. The median age was 33.4 years. 29.0% of residents were under the age of 18 and 13.6% of residents were 65 years of age or older. For every 100 females there were 92.5 males, and for every 100 females age 18 and over there were 89.9 males age 18 and over.

0.0% of residents lived in urban areas, while 100.0% lived in rural areas.

There were 578 households in Fair Grove, of which 45.7% had children under the age of 18 living in them. Of all households, 58.1% were married-couple households, 11.1% were households with a male householder and no spouse or partner present, and 23.0% were households with a female householder and no spouse or partner present. About 20.2% of all households were made up of individuals and 10.9% had someone living alone who was 65 years of age or older.

There were 614 housing units, of which 5.9% were vacant. The homeowner vacancy rate was 1.1% and the rental vacancy rate was 12.3%.

Racial composition as of the 2020 census
Race	Number	Percent
White	1,446	91.4%
Black or African American	3	0.2%
American Indian and Alaska Native	14	0.9%
Asian	10	0.6%
Native Hawaiian and Other Pacific Islander	1	0.1%
Some other race	14	0.9%
Two or more races	94	5.9%
Hispanic or Latino (of any race)	42	2.7%

=== 2010 census ===
As of the census of 2010, there were 1,393 people, 529 households, and 389 families residing in the city. The population density was 438.1 inhabitants per square mile (169.2/km^{2}). There were 580 housing units at an average density of 182.4 per square mile (70.4/km^{2}). The racial makeup of the city was 97.4% White, 0.3% African American, 0.3% Native American, 0.5% Asian, 0.6% from other races, and 0.9% from two or more races. Hispanic or Latino of any race were 2.2% of the population.

There were 529 households, of which 40.5% had children under the age of 18 living with them, 56.5% were married couples living together, 11.9% had a female householder with no husband present, 5.1% had a male householder with no wife present, and 26.5% were non-families. 23.1% of all households were made up of individuals, and 8.5% had someone living alone who was 65 years of age or older. The average household size was 2.63 and the average family size was 3.08.

The median age in the city was 34.3 years. 29.1% of residents were under the age of 18; 7.3% were between the ages of 18 and 24; 29.3% were from 25 to 44; 23.1% were from 45 to 64; and 11.2% were 65 years of age or older. The gender makeup of the city was 48.7% male and 51.3% female.

=== 2000 census ===
As of the census of 2000, there were 1,107 people, 405 households, and 309 families residing in the city. The population density was 357.1 inhabitants per square mile (137.9/km^{2}). There were 421 housing units at an average density of 135.8 per square mile (52.4/km^{2}). The racial makeup of the city was 98.19% White, 0.18% Native American, 0.18% Asian, and 1.45% from two or more races. Hispanic or Latino of any race were 0.36% of the population.

There were 405 households, out of which 43.7% had children under the age of 18 living with them, 59.5% were married couples living together, 12.1% had a female householder with no husband present, and 23.5% were non-families. 20.7% of all households were made up of individuals, and 10.9% had someone living alone who was 65 years of age or older. The average household size was 2.73 and the average family size was 3.18.

In the city the population was spread out, with 31.7% under the age of 18, 8.1% from 18 to 24, 32.6% from 25 to 44, 17.4% from 45 to 64, and 10.1% who were 65 years of age or older. The median age was 31 years. For every 100 females, there were 93.9 males. For every 100 females age 18 and over, there were 88.1 males.

The median income for a household in the city in 2000 was $36,761, and the median income for a family was $41,167. Males had a median income of $30,688 versus $21,447 for females. The per capita income for the city was $16,765. About 6.4% of families and 6.8% of the population were below the poverty line, including 7.1% of those under age 18 and 11.5% of those age 65 or over.

== Education ==
Fair Grove R-X School District is a K-12 school district located at 132 N. Main Street in Fair Grove. The school district is again for the ninth year out of 10 and for the last four years Accredited with Distinction in Performance. This is the highest accreditation awarded by the Missouri Department of Elementary and Secondary Education. The school enrollment is 1,140 students in the learning centers: grades PreK–4, 5–8, and 9–12. In addition to the basic courses, instruction is provided through classes of remediation, special needs, enrichment, college preparatory, advanced, vocational courses, area vocational school, dual credit and distant learning courses with nearby universities. This district far exceeds the educational opportunities required by the Missouri Department of Elementary and Secondary Education.

In 2007, voters approved a tax bond for new construction projects and for renovation of current space. In the summer of 2008, the construction was completed on the new Middle School that was built in 2007 as a result of the tax bond. The New Middle School was opened for the 2008–09 school year. As of May 2013, Fair Grove completed a new Federal Emergency Management Agency (FEMA) storm shelter / safe room that the school and community can utilize during a tornado warning. The safe room was featured on the Today show on May 22, 2013, as reported by GoFairGrove.com, Fair Grove's main source for photos, news and information. Fair Grove made national news in 2009 due to part of the high school being destroyed during the May 2009 Southern Plains derecho event and the community has since taken steps to help protect the school and its students.

== Arts and culture ==
The most notable event that takes place in Fair Grove each year is the Fair Grove Heritage Reunion. This always takes place the last full weekend in September. This festival has its roots with the original Fair Grove Fair in the early 1900s and 1910s, and more recently with the Fair Grove Arts and Crafts Festival which started in 1978. Dan and Betty Manning organized a gathering of 12 local craftsmen to sell their wares on the square.

That first year, Granny Poke, in a bedraggled cookshack, fired up her wood stove to cook a batch of brown beans, poke greens, homemade fruit cobbler and cornbread. A short parade began the two-day event, with a small crowd attending. A few men of the town gathered at the mill to learn log splitting and shingle riving, and Sassafras tea, pawpaws and hickory nuts were available, just for the asking.

Since those early years, the organizers of that first festival have seen many changes and improvements. Today, the crowd estimate during the Fair Grove Heritage Reunion is 40,000 to 50,000 on Saturday and around 30,000 on Sunday. The number of booths have increased to almost 400, with many featuring demonstrations, such as weaving, bobbin lace and soap making. The two-day event still includes a parade and a church service in front of the historic mill.

Activities abound throughout the show area. Some of the favorites include corn grinding in the Boegel & Hine Flour Mill, working draft teams, an antique tractor rodeo, horse and mule obstacle course and wheat threshing. Primitive gasoline engines and steam-powered engines are furnished through the Early Day Gas Engines and Tractor Association, Branch 16 and The Ozark Steam Engine Association. Demonstrations of corn shredders and a corn shellers also occur throughout the day.

The 2012 the festival had an estimated 80,000 attendance. In 2007, the festival parade was the longest ever (over 3 hours long) in celebration of the festival's 40th Anniversary.
