= St. Joseph Civic Arena =

Multi-purpose arena in Saint Joseph, Missouri

Coordinates: 39°46′01″N 94°51′22″W

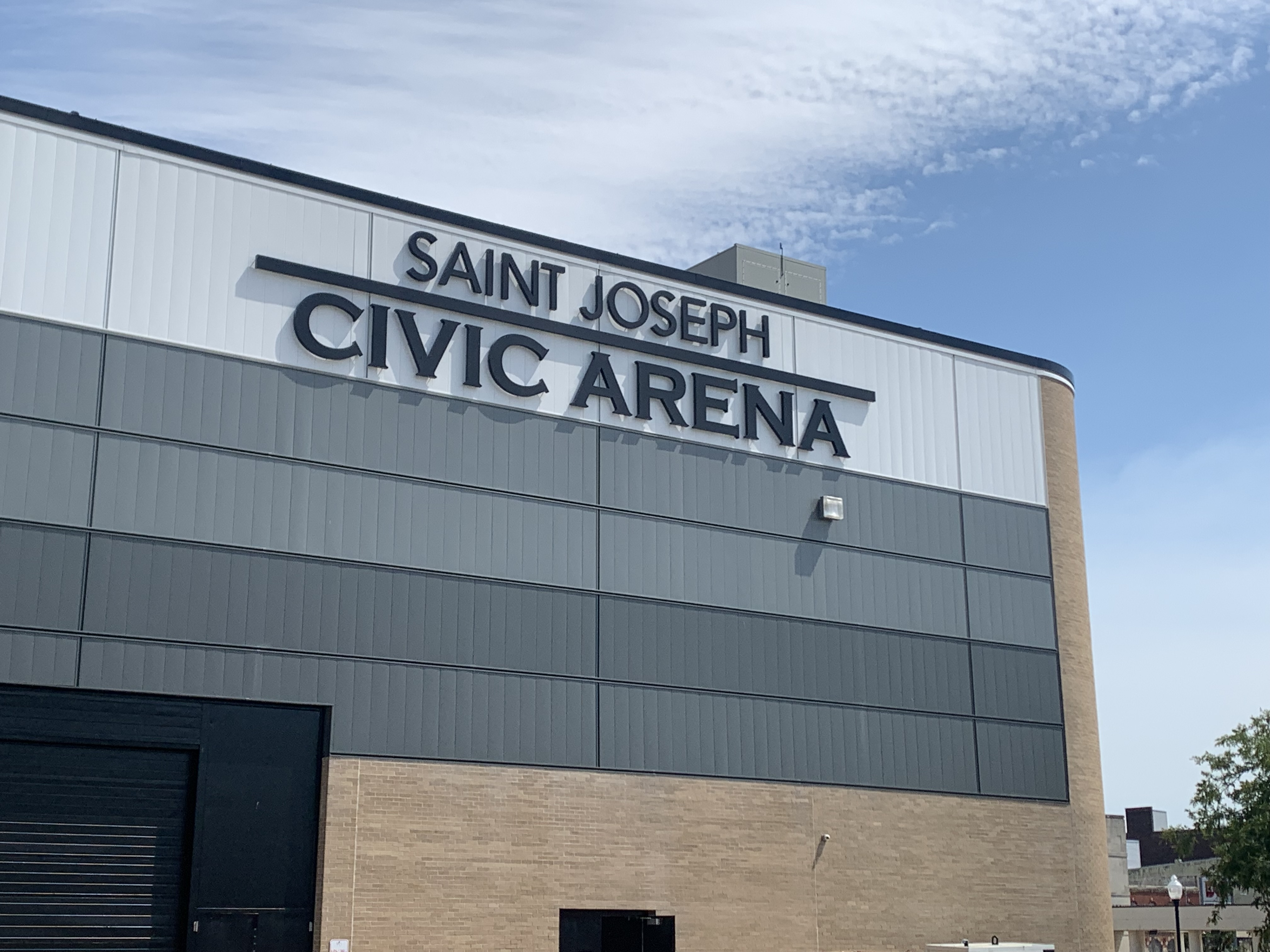
Saint Joseph Civic Arena

The St. Joseph Civic Arena is a 3,800-seat multi-purpose arena built in 1980 in St. Joseph, Missouri USA. It is used mainly to host indoor sporting events, such as basketball, arena football and National Bull Riding Finals. It has hosted two American Professional Football League franchises, the St. Joseph Explorers in 2003 and the St. Joseph Storm in 2005, and now hosts the St. Joseph Goats of The Arena League. It hosted the NCAA Women's Division II Basketball Championship in 2003, 2004, 2010 and 2011. It has and continues to host the National Federation of Professional Bullriders' National Finals, 2012 will mark their 14th year at the Civic Arena. The arena is also home to the Blacksnake Rollergirls MADE roller derby league.

The Arena immediately adjacent to the I-229 downtown St. Joseph exit was designed by Patty Berkebile Nelson and opened in 1980 and was part of a downtown St. Joseph urban renewal project. Other work in the same issue included purchase and extensive renovation of the Missouri Theater and Missouri Theater Building.
