= UNI-Dome =

Stadium in Iowa, USA

Coordinates: 42.5156°N 92.4673°W

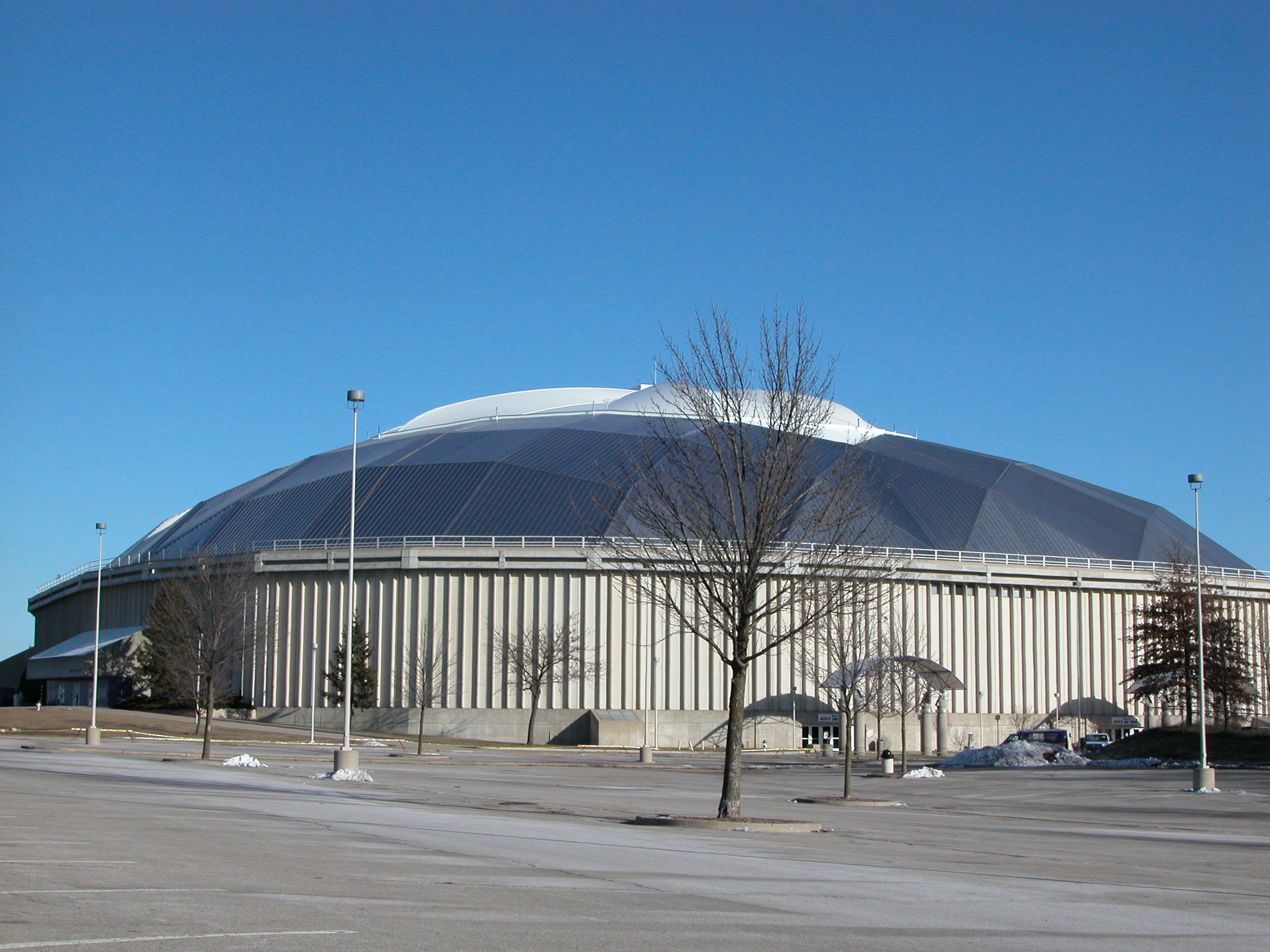
- Interactive map of UNI-Dome
- Location: 2401 Hudson Road; Cedar Falls, Iowa, 50614 United States
- Owner: University of Northern Iowa
- Operator: University of Northern Iowa
- Capacity: 17,190 (American football)
- Surface: AstroTurf PureGrass
- Public transit: 9 10 MET Transit

Construction
- Groundbreaking: July 26, 1974
- Built: 1974–1976
- Opened: February 7, 1976
- Cost: $7.5 million ($42.4 million in 2025 dollars)
- Architect: Thorson–Brom–Broshar–Snyder
- Structural engineer: Geiger-Berger Associates
- General contractor: John G. Miller Construction Company

Tenants
- Northern Iowa Panthers football (1976–present); Iowa Woo (TAL) (2026–present); Northern Iowa Panthers men's basketball (1976–2006); Northern Iowa Panthers women's basketball (1978–2006); Northern Iowa Panthers wrestling (1976–2006); Northern Iowa Panthers volleyball (1978–2006)

UNI-Dome (pronounced "YOU-nih-dome") is a multi-purpose stadium on the campus of the University of Northern Iowa in Cedar Falls, Iowa, United States. It opened in 1976 as the home of the UNI Panthers basketball and football teams. The facility's capacity for football is 16,324. For basketball, its official capacity is 16,324; however it has seated as many as 22,000 for events such as the 1990 Mid-Continent Conference men's basketball tournament and the 1997 NCAA Division I National Wrestling Championships. It has been the home of the Iowa State High School football championships since 1976 and has hosted junior college football bowl games, wrestling, track and field, softball, concerts, and conventions. The UNI-Dome is also home to the arena football team, Iowa Woo, in The Arena League.

== History ==
In 1994, the air-supported roof collapsed in a snowstorm. Since this had occurred on numerous occasions before, it was replaced by a more permanent metal roof. Prior to November 18, 2006, the basketball, volleyball and wrestling team used the UNI-Dome, before the construction of the McLeod Center. The McLeod Center is directly south of the UNI-Dome and connected by a covered walkway. The UNI-Dome attendance record for football is 17,190, which was set on October 17, 2009, during a Panthers homecoming game against the Missouri Valley rival Southern Illinois.

=== Renovations ===
The UNI-Dome's roof was most recently renovated in late summer 2010 due to damages during a high wind storm in July 2009. The cost of the renovation was close to $4 million. The storm knocked down trees, power lines and roofs all over Cedar Falls. The University of Northern Iowa campus lost 20% of its 100+-year-old trees that cover the campus.

The UNI-Dome received a new HD video board for the start of the 2008 football season. The board replaced an aging, and many times malfunctioning video board. Much of the cost of the new video board was donated by the Iowa High School Athletic Association, which hosts their state football semi-finals and finals in the UNI-Dome each year for all classes. Northern Iowan article

In 2014, the UNI-Dome had a 98' × 26' video board installed at the south end, then the second-largest in FCS football. The existing video board has replaced the north end scoreboard. All this was made possible with a grant from the Black Hawk Gaming Association.

A major renovation was also announced in 2014.

On April 26, 2017, University of Northern Iowa Athletics announced that it would be adding AstroTurf to the field of the UNI-Dome. The total cost of the new turf will be approximately $900,000 and will be paid for from previously allocated internal revenue from the university. The AstroTurf installation was completed prior to the 2017 season.

== Notable features ==
At football games, where cold temperatures are frequently an issue for fans, the UNI-Dome announcers have a tradition during pre-game rituals. The announcers will announce the weather in the town where the visiting team is from, and then will say "The temperature in the Dome, no wind, 72°, Welcome to the UNI-DOME!" to emphasize the fact that a domed stadium is not affected as much by the weather. In 2016, the university celebrated 40 years of history inside the Dome. As of December 1, 2019, the Panthers have a home record of 220–56–1, having won nearly 80 percent of their games in the dome.

== Other uses ==
During the academic year, during hours when the athletic teams are not using the Dome, it is open to the public. Many students and others with UNI connections will come to the Dome to run or walk the stairs and the concourse. The UNI-Dome has hosted graduation ceremonies as well. Perhaps the most notable ceremony was in the spring of 2011, when first lady Michelle Obama delivered the headlining address.

== Events ==
The Dome has also hosted professional wrestling events, as well as concerts by bands such as Rolling Stones, The Who, Grateful Dead, Mötley Crüe, REO Speedwagon, 3 Doors Down, Fuel, The Police and UB40 in 1983, Pink Floyd, Oleander, Luke Bryan, Jason Aldean (2015), Kenny Chesney, Florida Georgia Line, Nelly, Garth Brooks, and Fleetwood Mac who set the UNI-Dome attendance record when of 25,500 on December 1, 1979.

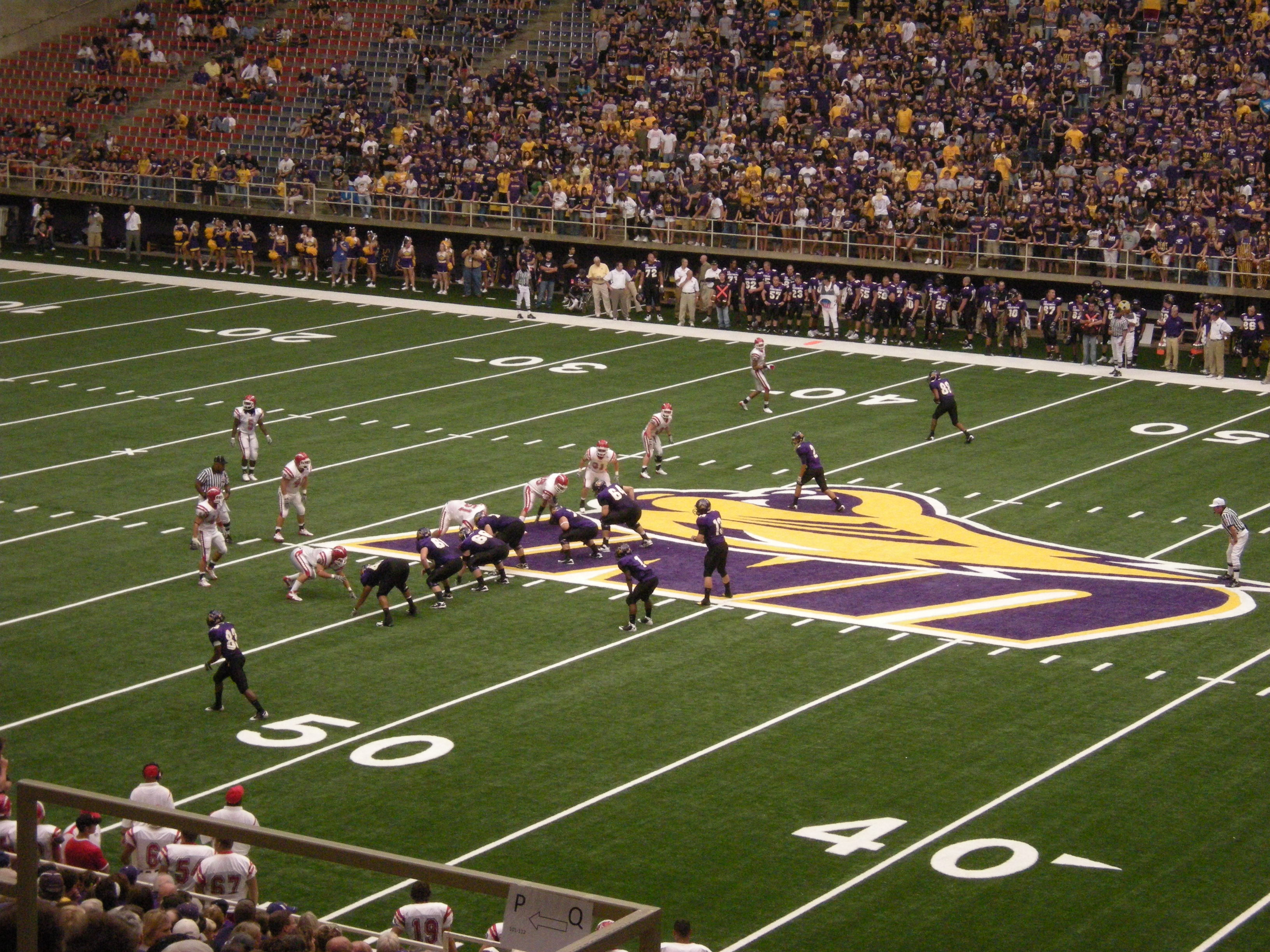
UNI football game against the St. Francis Red Flash September 19, 2009

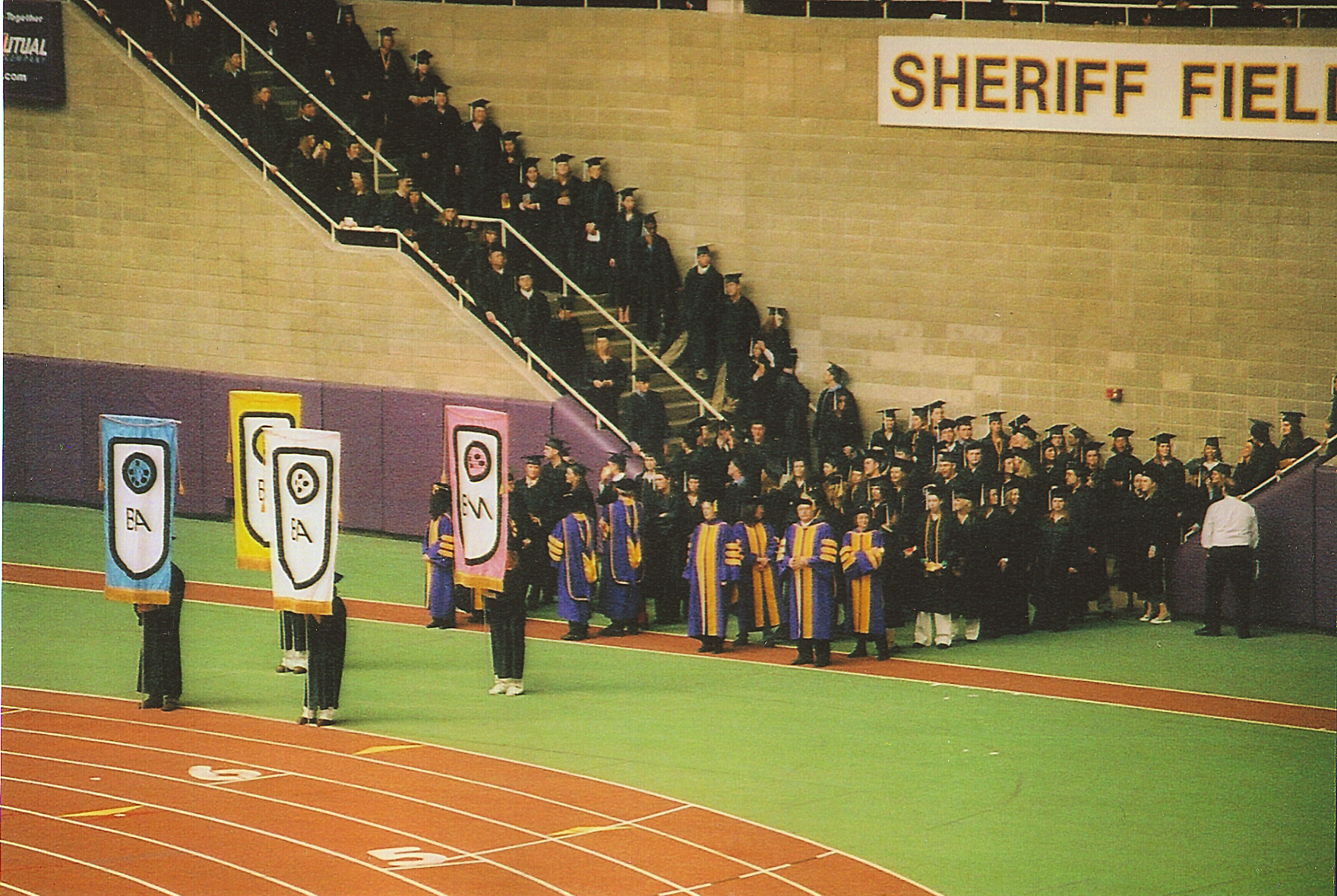
Professors marching in commencement ceremony, December 2005

== See also ==
- List of NCAA Division I FCS football stadiums
- List of NCAA Division I basketball arenas
