= Wilson Logistics Arena =

Multipurpose arena in Springfield, Missouri

- The Tackle Box
- Interactive map of Wilson Logistics Arena
- Address: 3001 N Grant Ave; Springfield, MO 65803
- Coordinates: 37°15′09″N 93°17′56″W
- Owner: Ozark Empire Fairgrounds
- Operator: Ozark Empire Fairgrounds
- Capacity: 6,700; 4,500 (indoor football)
- Surface: 210' x 85' (indoor football)
- Record attendance: 3,416 (June 1, 2024)

Construction
- Groundbreaking: November 17, 2022
- Opened: January 11, 2024
- Cost: $29 million
- Architect: BRP Architects
- Project manager: Killian Construction Co.
- General contractor: Ozark Empire Fairgrounds

Tenant
- Ozarks Lunkers (TAL) (2024-present)

Website
- www.ozarkempirefair.com

Wilson Logistics Arena is a multipurpose arena in Springfield, Missouri located on the Ozark Empire Fairgrounds. The stadium opened on January 11, 2024. The stadium replaced the Corwin Auto Arena.

== History ==
=== Corwin Auto Arena ===
Corwin Auto Arena was built in the 1960s and served as a livestock arena until being torn down in November 2022. The area had a seating capacity of 2,200. The Wilson Logistics Arena was constructed on the old Corwin Auto Arena land.

=== Wilson Logistics Arena ===
Wilson Logistics, a trucking company, secured 20-year naming rights for the arena for undisclosed price.

Although the arena was not completed yet, it was open for the 44th Annual Ozark Fall Farmfest on October 6-8, 2023 and the inaugural Springfield Auto Show on November 3-4, 2023. The arena opened on January 11, 2024.

== Arena Usage ==
=== Sports ===
The stadium currently hosts the Ozarks Lunkers in The Arena League, which began in June 2024. The league agreed to a three-year lease with the stadium.

Wilson Logistics Arena hosted the USA BMX National Championship Series from March 1-3, 2024.

=== Events ===
The arena will be able to accommodate all types of events with the ability to have a concrete or dirt floor. The facility will be 100,000 square feet and designed for trade shows, concerts, and competitions.

Preceded by none	Home of the Ozarks Lunkers; 2024	Succeeded by Current
