= Cam Bruffett =

American football coach (born 1989)

Profile
- Position: DB

Personal information
- Born: May 11, 1989 (age 37)
- Listed height: 5 ft 11 in (1.80 m)
- Listed weight: 190 lb (86 kg)

Career information
- High school: Fair Grove (MO)
- College: Evangel (2010-2013)
- NFL draft: 2014: undrafted

Career history

Playing
- Pittsburgh Power (2014); Cleveland Gladiators (2015-2016)

Coaching
- Evangel (2014) Defensive backs coach; Logan-Rogersville HS (MO) (2015–2017) Defensive backs coach; Logan-Rogersville HS (MO) (2018–2022) Offensive coordinator; Parkview HS (MO) (2023–present) Head coach; Ozarks Lunkers (2024–present) Head coach

Awards and highlights
- All-Heart of America Athletic Conference selection (2010-2013)

Career AFL statistics
- Tackles: 0
- Interceptions: 0
- Stats at ArenaFan.com

Head coaching record
- Regular season: 3–14 (.176)
- Postseason: 0–2 (.000)
- Career: 3-16 (.158)

Cameron W. Bruffett (born May 11, 1989), is an American football coach. He is currently the head football coach for Parkview High School and the inaugural head coach of the Ozarks Lunkers in The Arena League (The AL or TAL), which began in 2024. Bruffett is also a former defensive back in the Arena Football League (AFL).

== Early life ==
Bruffett played high school football at Fair Grove, playing quarterback and defensive back. He set school records in all-time passing yards and all-purpose yards. In his senior season, the team finished 13-1 and he threw for 1,300 yards, rushed for 1,100 yards, made 60 tackles, and had six interceptions.

== College years ==
Bruffett played four seasons at Evangel (NAIA), where he earned All-Heart of America Athletic Conference selections each season as a defensive back. His 14 career interceptions are tied for the second most in program history.

Bruffett received the 2014 Physical Education Graduate of the Year award.

== Professional playing career ==
Bruffett played for the Pittsburgh Power.

On October 16, 2014, Evangel announced that Bruffett had signed with the Cleveland Gladiators of the Arena Football League. Bruffett's professional playing career ended due to a hamstring injury.

== Coaching career ==
=== Parkview High School ===
On February 21, 2023, Parkview High School named Bruffett their new head coach. Bruffett's record is 0–9 in the regular season and 0–1 in the post-season.

=== Ozarks Lunkers ===
On October 4, 2023, Bruffett was named as the inaugural head coach of the Ozarks Lunkers in the Arena League.

=== Head coaching record ===
League	Team	Year	Regular season				Postseason			
League	Team	Year	Won	Lost	Ties	Win %	Won	Lost	Win %	Result
MSHSAA	Parkview Vikings	2023	0	9	0	.000	0	1	.000	Lost first round
High School Total			0	9	0	.000	0	1	.000	
TAL	Ozarks Lunkers	2024	3	5	0	.375	0	1	.000	Lost semi-final
Professional Total			3	5	0	.375	0	1	.000	
Total			3	14	0	.176	0	2	.000	

== Personal life ==
Bruffett married his wife, Gabriela Verdugo-Bruffett, in 2015. Gaby was an NCAA Division II National Champion Swimmer at Ashland University and represented Mexico in the 2011 Pan American Games.
