= Dorsey Golston III =

American football coach (born 1983)

Profile
- Position: Safety

Personal information
- Born: July 6, 1983 (age 43); Kansas City, Missouri
- Listed height: 6 ft 0 in (1.83 m)
- Listed weight: 200 lb (91 kg)

Career information
- High school: Southeast (Kansas City, MO)
- College: Wyoming (2003-2006)
- NFL draft: 2007: undrafted

Career history

Playing
- Colorado Ice (2008); Kansas City Renegades (2013); Kansas City Bulldogs (2018)

Coaching
- Southeast HS (MO) Defensive backs coach; KC Phantoms (2017-) Defensive backs coach; Topeka Tropics (2022-2023) Defensive backs coach; Lee's Summit West HS (MO) (-present) Defensive backs coach; Kansas City Goats (2024–present) Head coach

Awards and highlights
- All-Mountain West Conference selection (2006); IFL All-Star (2008)

Career AFL statistics
- Tackles: 0
- Sacks: 0

Head coaching record
- Regular season: 7–1 (.875)
- Postseason: 0–1 (.000)
- Career: 7-2 (.778)

Dorsey Golston III (born July 6, 1983) is an American football coach. He is currently the inaugural head coach of the Kansas City Goats in The Arena League (The AL or TAL), which began play in 2024. Golston is also a former indoor football player.

== College years ==
College recruiting
Name	Hometown	School	Height	Weight	Commit date
Dorsey Golston III; CB	Kansas City, Missouri	Southeast High School	6 ft 2 in (1.88 m)	190 lb (86 kg)	Jul 8, 2003
Dorsey Golston III; CB	Recruit ratings: Rivals: 247Sports:				
Overall recruit ranking:
Note: In many cases, Scout, Rivals, 247Sports, On3, and ESPN may conflict in their listings of height and weight.; In these cases, the average was taken. ESPN grades are on a 100-point scale.; Sources: "2002 Team Ranking". Rivals.com.

=== Wyoming ===
Golston received interests from Colorado, Kansas, Kansas State, Missouri, and Wyoming but received no formal visits. Golston originally committed to Wyoming on February 1, 2002 and re-committed to Wyoming on July 8, 2003.

Golston was academically ineligible for the 2003 season and lost his scholarship, but regained his scholarship for the 2004 season.

In Golston's senior season he was a Mountain West Conference honorable mention. He finished the season tied for second in interceptions behind Eric Weddle, a former NFL player that was selected in the second round.

NCAA collegiate career Stats
Wyoming Cowboys
Season	Games	Defensive				
Season	GP	Tackles	Sacks	Int	FF	FR
2003	academically ineligible					
2004	11	32	0	1	0	0
2005	11	22	0	1	0	0
2006	12	38	0	4	1	0
Career	34	92	0	6	1	0

== Coaching career ==
=== Kansas City Goats ===
On May 2, 2024, Golston was announced as the inaugural head coach of the Kansas City Goats in the Arena League.

=== Head coaching record ===
League	Team	Year	Regular season				Postseason			
League	Team	Year	Won	Lost	Ties	Win %	Won	Lost	Win %	Result
TAL	Kansas City Goats	2024	7	1	0	.875	0	1	.000	Lost semi-final
Total			7	1	0	.875	0	1	.000	
