= Duluth Entertainment Convention Center =

Arena & convention center in Duluth, MN

Coordinates: 46°46′53″N 92°05′53″W

Duluth Entertainment Convention Center Arena
- (DECC)
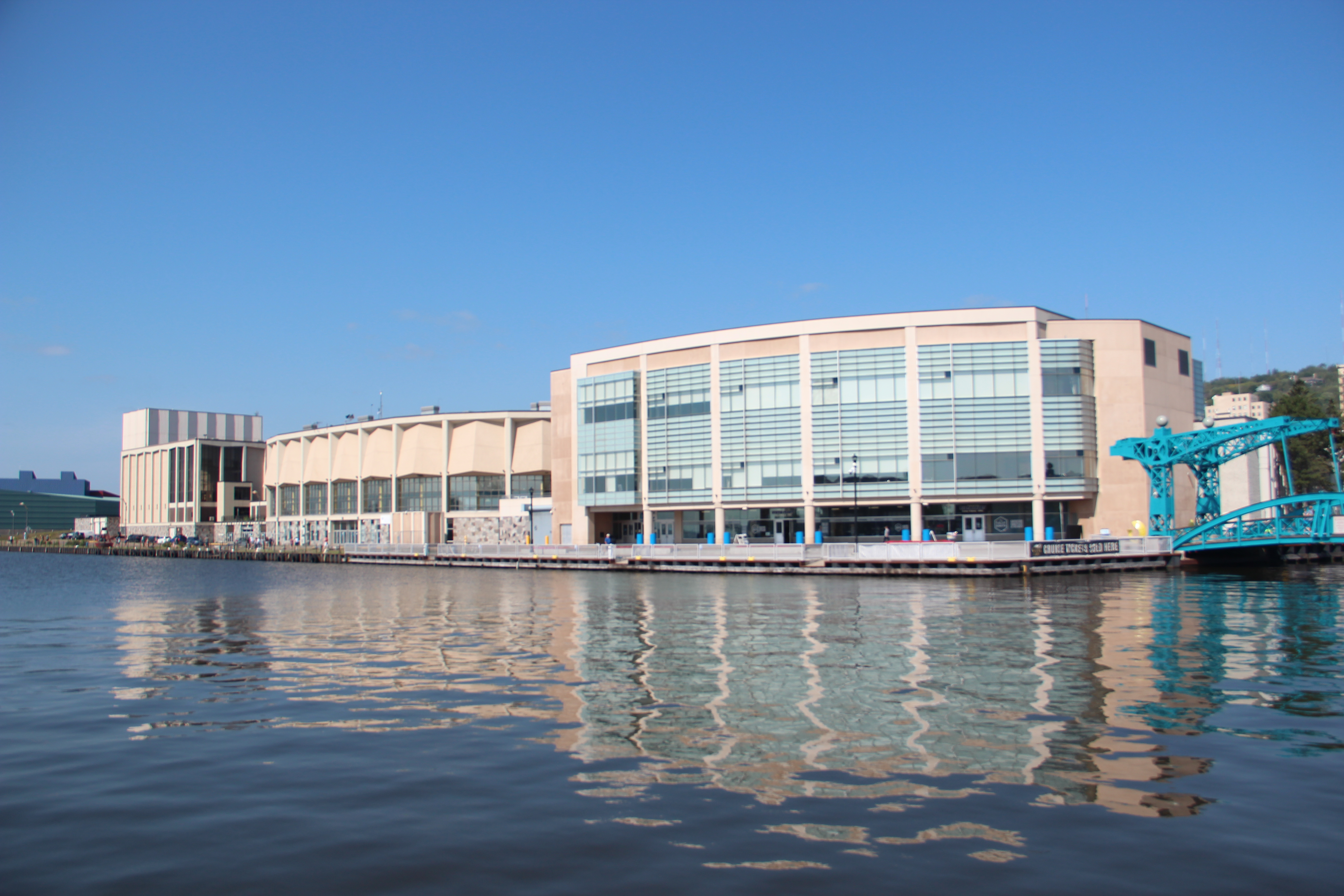
- Interactive map of Duluth Entertainment Convention Center Arena
- Former names: Duluth Arena Auditorium (1966–2010)
- Address: 350 Harbor Drive; Duluth, MN 55802
- Owner: Duluth Entertainment Convention Center
- Operator: Duluth Entertainment Convention Center
- Capacity: 5,333
- Surface: 190' x 85' (hockey); 210' x 85' (indoor football)

Construction
- Opened: 1966
- Cost: $6.5 million

Tenants
- Minnesota Duluth Bulldogs Men's Hockey (1966–2010); Minnesota Duluth Bulldogs Women's Hockey (1999–2010); Duluth-Superior Lumberjacks (IFL) (1999–2000); Duluth Harbor Monsters (TAL) (2024–2025)

Duluth Entertainment Convention Center (DECC) is a multi-purpose arena and convention center complex located in Duluth, Minnesota. The DECC's existing arena was home to the University of Minnesota Duluth Bulldogs men's hockey team from 1966 to 2010 until they moved to the DECC's newer arena, AMSOIL Arena, in December 2010. The DECC is located on the waterfront near Duluth's famous Aerial Lift Bridge.

== DECC Arena ==
=== History ===
The DECC Arena, originally called the Duluth Arena Auditorium, was built at a cost of $6.5 million, the arena portion of the complex houses a 190-by-85 foot hockey rink with 5,333 seats, and six locker rooms, including the recently remodeled $2 million locker room facility now used by the Bulldogs men and women hockey teams.

The rink can be converted to allow the DECC Arena to host concerts, dinners, conventions, and shows. A spacious lobby, where ticket sales originate, separates the Arena from Symphony Hall.

=== Sports ===
The DECC was the site of the NCAA Division I men's hockey championships in both 1968 and 1981, and hosted the 2003 and 2008 Women's Frozen Four.

The DECC Arena hosted arena football teams such as the Duluth-Superior Lumberjacks of the Indoor Football League from 1999 to 2000, and the Duluth Harbor Monsters of The Arena League from 2024 to 2025.

== Symphony Hall ==
Symphony Hall is an auditorium that seats 2,400 and plays host to concerts, symphonies, plays, operas, high school and college graduations, and a variety of other activities.

== Pioneer Hall ==
Pioneer Hall was added in 1976, and contains a hockey rink with smaller seating capability utilizing fold-out bleacher seating. Pioneer Hall is also the home of the Duluth Curling Club with eight curling rinks (can be expanded to provide up to 13 curling sheets for major events) and a lounge area. It is the largest curling venue in the United States, and has hosted two World Championships, the US Olympic Trials, and numerous National events. The Duluth Curling Club is the second largest curling club in the United States.

== Convention center ==
Paulucci Hall, located beneath the lobby and built with the original Duluth Arena Auditorium in 1966, hosts numerous events. exhibits, expos, and social functions. Originally named Exhibition Hall, the space was dedicated to Jeno Paulucci on April 24, 1967.

In the mid-1990s a $30 million convention center was added, which is the site of numerous social, business and entertainment events, and features the 26,000 sq ft (2,400 m^{2}) Lake Superior Ballroom, the 12,000 sq ft (1,100 m^{2}) Harborside Ballroom, and 25 Meeting Rooms.

== AMSOIL Arena ==
The 2008 Minnesota bonding bill included $38 million for the "DECC expansion project". The DECC expansion included a new multi-purpose arena for the UMD men's and women's ice hockey teams, The arena was an increase in seating capacity by 2,100 from the original DECC Arena and seats 6,600 for ice hockey and 8,500 for concerts. The expansion project also included a new parking ramp and more space for conventions and concerts, which DECC director Dan Russell said will bring more events to the complex. Construction began in September (2008), and the AMSOIL Arena opened on December 30, 2010, for a Men's UMD hockey game against the University of North Dakota. The new arena was named AMSOIL Arena.

Preceded by none	Home of the Duluth-Superior Lumberjacks; 1999–2000	Succeeded by none
Preceded by none	Home of the Duluth Harbor Monsters; 2024	Succeeded by Current
Preceded by Onondaga War Memorial; Syracuse, New York	Host of the Frozen Four; 1968	Succeeded by Broadmoor World Arena; Colorado Springs, Colorado
Preceded by Providence Civic Center; Providence, Rhode Island	Host of the Frozen Four; 1981	Succeeded by Providence Civic Center; Providence, Rhode Island
