= WEBC-FM =

Radio station in Superior, Wisconsin (1940–1950)

- Superior, Wisconsin; United States
- Frequency: 92.3 MHz

Programming
- Format: Defunct

Ownership
- Owner: Head of the Lakes Broadcasting Company
- Sister stations: WEBC

History
- First air date: March 15, 1940; 86 years ago (as W9XYH)
- Last air date: May 13, 1950; 76 years ago
- Former call signs: W9XYH (1940–1943); WDUL (1943–1947)
- Former frequencies: 43.1 MHz (1940–1943); 44.5 MHz (1944–1945)

Technical information
- Power: 65,000 watts
- Transmitter coordinates: 46.691°N 92.104°W

WEBC-FM (92.3 FM) was a radio station licensed to Superior, Wisconsin and which served the Duluth-Superior metropolitan area.

== History ==
WEBC-FM began broadcasting on March 15, 1940, as what was then "the farthest west United States FM radio station", and with the experimental callsign W9XYH. It was an early adopter of United States low band (44-50 MHz) frequency modulation broadcasting. When the FM band was moved to its present location of 88-108 MHz in 1945, WEBC-FM (then WDUL) was the first station in the nation to begin regular programming on the new band.
