= St. Joseph Goats =

Arena football team

- Current season
Logo

General information
- Founded: 2023
- Headquartered: St. Joseph Civic Arena in St. Joseph, Missouri
- Colors: Light blue, Black, white
- StJGoatsFootball.com

Personnel
- Owners: Christian Okoye; George Gates; Steven St. John; Travis Kelce; Jason Kelce
- Head coach: Dorsey Golston III

Team history
- Kansas City Goats (2024); St. Joseph Goats (2025–present)

Home fields
- Municipal Auditorium (2024); St. Pius X High School (2024); St. Joseph Civic Arena (2025–present)

League / conference affiliations
- The Arena League (2024–present)

Championships
- Division championships: 0; 1

The St. Joseph Goats (formerly known as the Kansas City Goats) are a professional indoor football team based in St. Joseph, Missouri in the United States. They are currently members of The Arena League (The AL or TAL). They played their home games at Municipal Auditorium and St. Pius X High School for the 2024 AL season, but moved to nearby St. Joseph, Missouri. As of 2025, they play their home games at the St. Joseph Civic Arena.

== History ==
Kansas City Goats Logo (2024)

On June 14, 2023, Kansas City was announced as the fourth city of the Arena League alongside the announcement of the Ozarks Lunkers, Springfield, Missouri's team.

Kansas City Athlete Training is the official practice and training partner for the Goats.

On October 31, 2024, the team announced their relocation from Kansas City to St. Joseph. On April 17, 2025, the team unveiled their new uniforms and officially changed their name to the St. Joseph Goats and play at the St. Joseph Civic Arena.

=== Team logo and name ===
On July 17, 2023, the team name and logos were announced. The logos were designed by Ryan Foose and feature a goat wearing a hat, suit, and tie.

The name honors former city council member Tom Pendergast, whose faction was nicknamed "the Goats". Pendergast helped push the Municipal Arena through construction; the arena is the home venue for the team.

Some other names suggested included the Potholes, Kings, and Ribs.

== 2024 roster ==
St. Joseph Goats
Players: 1 Boo Smith WR; 2 Brion Murray DB; 3 Deonte Dudley; 5 Ky'Von Smith DB; 6 Lamar Robbins DB; 7 Ryan Martinez WR; 8 Malik Wilson DB; 9 Marcus Zweifel DB; 10 Ben Thomas DB; 11 Josh Hollins QB; 13 Carelle Hill WR; 16 Angelo Trujillo; 20 Aaron Rountree LB; 21 Rakeem Cato QB; 25 James Harden WR/RB; 87 Bryan Cox TE; 88 Jamall Williams TE	Reserve lists: 2 Kevin Felder; 3 Prince Shonola; 5 Tyler Meeks; 6 Larry Beavers; 15 Shakespeare Williams DB; 60 Robin Powell-Deppe OL; 95 Lawrence Smith; - Michael Reynolds; Rookies in italics; updated July 3, 2024; 17 Active, 8 Inactive

== Staff ==
St. Joseph Goats staff
Front office: Owner – Garage Beer (Evan and Jake Rouse, Travis and Jason Kelce); Owner – Steven Craig; Owner – Kendall Randolph; Managing Partner/Owner – Ted Sweeney; General Manager – Aden Monzon; Dance Coach – Emily Crouse	Head coaches: Head coach – Dorsey Golston III; Offensive coaches: Offensive Coordinator – Tyrone Groves; Defensive coaches: Defensive Coordinator – Dorsey Golston III

== Management ==
St. Joseph area native Steven Craig purchased the team from previous owners when the team made the move to St. Joseph. After Craig purchased the team, St. Joseph native Kendall Randolph and current Managing Partner Ted Sweeney also purchased portions of the team. On May 29, 2025, the Goats announced the addition of Garage Beer, which is co-owned by Travis Kelce and Jason Kelce, to the team's ownership group.
