= Ozarks Lunkers =

Arena football team

- Current season
Logo

General information
- Founded: 2023
- Headquartered: Springfield, Missouri
- Colors: Red, Foliage Green, Sky Blue, Darker Lake Blue
- Mascot: Lunky the Lunker

Personnel
- Owner: Mark Burgess
- General manager: Caleb Scott
- Head coach: Cam Bruffett

Team history
- Ozarks Lunkers (2024–present)

Home fields
- Wilson Logistics Arena (2024–present)

League / conference affiliations
- The Arena League (2024–present)

The Ozarks Lunkers are a professional indoor football team based in Springfield, Missouri. They are currently members of The Arena League (The AL or TAL). They play their home games at Wilson Logistics Arena, a multipurpose arena built next to the Ozark Empire Fairgrounds.

== History ==
On March 9, 2023, League Commissioner Tim Brown announced Springfield, Missouri as the first of four cities that would be receiving an Arena League team. The Lunkers are the second arena football team in Springfield, Missouri, after the short-lived Springfield WolfPack of the APFL.

On October 20, 2023, CoxHealth signed into a partnership with the Lunkers as the team's health care provider.

=== Team name and logo ===
After receiving nearly five thousand entries for the name-the-team contest, Ozarks Lunkers was selected; submitted by Nixa resident, Diane Buatte. Lunker is an exceptionally large specimen, particularly a fish. The team's primary logo depicts a leaping largemouth bass wearing a red football helmet. The logos were designed by Ryan Foose.

Many submissions were related to fishing, Route 66, soda jerks, or the Great Cobra Scare of 1953.

== Roster ==
The first of two open tryouts for the Lunkers was held on October 21, 2023. The Lunkers held a closed scrimmage of 19 players on November 19, 2023. The second open tryout was held on December 9, 2023. Most of the roster was populated by members of the Queen City Insane Asylum, a semi-professional eight-man football team that general manager Caleb Scott owned.

On December 5, 2023, the Lunkers signed Matt Rush, the first player to sign with an AL team. Rush went to Springfield's Hillcrest High School and played defensive back at Missouri State.

The Lunkers signed quarterback Tyler Kulka, who had led the Nashville Kats to an Arena Crown appearance in the 2025 Arena Football One (AF1) season, partway through the 2025 season after AF1's season ended. Kulka's arrival is credited with reviving the Lunkers' on-field fortunes, bringing with him a wave of "Kulkamania."

Ozarks Lunkers roster
Players: 0 Ell Teycer; 1 Tobias Little; 2 Matt Rush; 3 Kendrick Payne WR; 4 Chris Scruggs, Jr. WR; 5 Brock Carter DB; 7 Darius Daniel WR; 8 Edward Sands; 9 Craig Travis LB; 10 Jackson Mitchell; 11 Marqui Smalls QB; 13 Ronnie Bertelsmeyer WR; 15 Josh Evans DL; 16 Laurenz Plummer WR; 17 Taiwo Oluwafunmila	Reserve lists: - Patrick Puletasi DL; - Myran Mounds DB; 6 Jai'len Jones DB; 12 Anthony Sherrils DB; 18 Wren Rodriguez; Rookies in italics; updated July 8, 2024; 15 Active, 5 Inactive

== Staff ==
Ozarks Lunkers staff
Front office: Owner – Mark Burgess; General manager – Stacie Wells; Vice president of team operations – Monica Henderson; Director of media – Dalton Bagley; Account executive of ticket sales and promotions – Nadia Deleon	Head coaches: Head coach – Cam Bruffett; Offensive coaches: Offensive coordinator/wide receivers coach – Zach Troutman; Offensive quality control – Justin DeFreece; Defensive coaches: Defensive coordinator/defensive backs coach – Jimmie Strong; Defensive line/Linebackers coach – Lee Howard; Defensive quality control – Cody Kimes

== Management ==
On June 14, 2023, the league announced Mark A. Burgess, a local airline owner, would be the principal owner of the team and that the team would be called the Ozarks Lunkers for their inaugural season.

On October 4, 2023, the team announced Cam Bruffett as the head coach.
