= Iowa Woo =

Arena football team

- Current season
Logo

General information
- Founded: 2023
- Headquartered: Cedar Valley
- Colors: Light blue, Yellow, Pink
- Mascot: Wacky Woo Loo
- IowaWoo.com

Personnel
- Owners: Jeff Holmes; Julia Stone
- General manager: Vacant
- Head coach: Victor Mann

Team history
- Waterloo Woo (2023); Iowa Woo (2024–present)

Home fields
- The Hippodrome (2024–2025) UNI-Dome (2026-present)

League / conference affiliations
- The Arena League (2024–present)

The Iowa Woo are a professional indoor football team based in Waterloo, Iowa. They are currently members of The Arena League (The AL or TAL). They originally played their home games at The Hippodrome at the National Cattle Congress before moving to the UNI-Dome in neighboring Cedar Falls, Iowa.

== History ==
On May 4, 2023, Waterloo was announced as the third city of the Arena League.

The Woo had North Cedar Elementary School in Cedar Falls take part in helping name the team's mascot. The top three names from each class were selected and fan voting took place to name the mascot. The winning mascot name was Wacky Woo Loo, nicknamed Wacky.

=== Team logo and name ===
On June 28, 2023, the team name and logos were announced. Woo was selected for multiple reasons as it pertains to trains and wrestler Ric Flair's legendary "Wooooooo!". Waterloo is home to the Dan Gable Museum, a wrestling museum operated by the National Wrestling Hall of Fame. Waterloo also has a historical tie to the railroad industry. "Woo" is a callback to blaring train whistles.

The primary logo depicts a robed, blonde haired wolf wearing sunglasses holding a football in one arm while striking the Heisman pose. The secondary logo shows the mascot wearing yellow boots. The logos were designed by Ryan Foose.

Iowa's General Manager, Bailey McRae, stated that many submissions consisted of variations of "woo" and "loo".

On October 19, 2023, the team changed their name from the Waterloo Woo to the Iowa Woo.

On March 15, 2024, the team released an updated logo. The new logo depicts a white-haired wolf wearing sunglasses, a cowboy hat, and a Hawaiian shirt holding a football in one arm while striking the Heisman pose.

Original Ric Flair-inspired logo

=== Changes ===
On January 14, 2025, head coach Mook Zimmerman had announced his resignation as head coach of the Woo. Mere days later, on January 23, they introduced Victor Mann as their new head coach.

For the 2026 season, the team relocated to the UNI-Dome on the University of Northern Iowa campus in Cedar Falls, Iowa.

== Roster ==
The Woo hosted the team's first tryout on December 9, 2023. The team's second tryout was on March 2, 2024.

On February 23, 2024 the Woo signed their franchise's first player, Ellis Lankster.

Iowa Woo roster
Players: 0 Myles Goulbourne WR; 1 Jamal Couch WR; 4 Derrick Wilson DB; 5 Marcus Pierce RB; 6 Chris Herring DB; 7 Darren Lake DE; 8 Justice Olibrice QB; 9 Adrian Tolbert WR; 10 Harding; 10 Mustafa Mageed DB; 11 Oscar Scott OL; 12 Vincent Espinoza; 14 Justin Brown WR; 16 -; 20 Lamar Sayles, Jr. LB; 21 Bealeay	Reserve lists: 2 Rogria Lewis DB; 3 James Jones WR; 32 KJ McMillian; - Ellis Lankster DB; - Jaylen Becton LB; - Emmanuel Akingbulu OL; - Chris Boudreaux WR; - Bob Chase QB; - Liam Stone G; - Quentin Chaplin WR; - Tyalen Shaw QB; - Everitt Cunningham LB; - Marcus Green DB; - J.J. Jones III WR; Rookies in italics; updated June 24, 2024; 16 Active, 13 Inactive

== Staff ==
=== Head coaches ===
Name	Years	Won	Lost	Ties	Winning %	Postseason
Mook Zimmerman	2024	1	7	0	.125	Lost ArenaMania I
Vacant	2025	—	—	—	—	—
Total		1	7	0	.125	

=== Current staff ===
Iowa Woo staff
Front office: Owner – Jeff Holmes; Owner – Julia Stone; General manager – Vacant; Director of operations – Dylan Petersen; Director of customer experience – Tanner Blaylock	Head coaches: Head coach – Vacant; Assistant coach – Frank Coston; Offensive coaches: Offensive coordinator – TBA; Defensive coaches: Defensive coordinator – TBA

== Management ==
On June 28, 2023, Bailey McRae was publicly addressed as the general manager of the team. Amanda McCormick was hired as the general manager for the 2025 season; however, on November 13, 2024 resigned of the title.

On October 19, 2023, Jeff Holmes and Julia Stone were announced as the team owners. They also own two recycling companies, Push Resource Recovery and A-Line Iron & Metals.

On February 29, 2024, the Woo announced Mook Zimmerman as the inaugural head coach.
