= The Arena League =

Professional American arena football league

- Upcoming season or competition: 2026 The Arena League season
- Sport: Arena football
- Founded: February 2, 2024 (2 years ago)
- First season: 2024
- Commissioner: Tim Brown
- No. of teams: 6 (as of October 24th, 2026)
- Country: United States
- Most recent champions: St. Joseph Goats (1st title)
- Most titles: Duluth Harbor Monsters (2 titles)
- Broadcaster: YouTube
- Related competitions: AF1, IFL, NAL
- Website: thearenaleague.football

The Arena League (The AL or TAL) is an indoor American football league in the United States. The league launched in 2024 with four teams playing six-on-six football, but expanded to six-teams and started playing 7-on-7 indoor football in its second season.

== History ==
The league was first announced in February 2023, with Pro Football Hall of Famer Tim Brown as TAL Commissioner. The league then released a list of ten semi-finalist markets, which people could vote for the city to be a part of the inaugural season: Waterloo, Iowa; Kansas City, Missouri; Springfield, Missouri; Rochester, Minnesota; Little Rock, Arkansas; Rockford, Illinois; Dubuque, Iowa; Oklahoma City, Oklahoma; Duluth, Minnesota and Wichita Falls, Texas with fans casting their votes at the AL official website.

The first city announced was Springfield with Duluth being the second city. Waterloo was announced on May 4 as the third team. Kansas City was the fourth and final team announced for the inaugural 2024 season. The league anticipates expanding in the forthcoming years, including adding two teams for the 2025 season, with hope to expand to 12 teams by 2026. In September, the AL released the 2024 schedule.

On October 19, 2023, the Waterloo Woo announced their owners and changed their team name to the Iowa Woo.

On April 5, 2024, the league released a list of five markets, which people could vote via a poll on their website for the city to be an expansion franchise beginning in the 2025 season. The five markets included: Dallas, Texas; Eau Claire, Wisconsin; St. Joseph, Missouri; Hot Springs, Arkansas; and Rochester, Minnesota, which was a part of the inaugural season voting. On April 25, 2024, the league announced that Hot Springs would be the first expansion team and will begin play in 2025. The league has also announced a second expansion team in Eau Claire, Wisconsin, to be branded as the Eau Claire Jammers, but then rebranded as the Eau Claire Axemen. The league was forced to take over the Axemen's operations shortly before the start of the 2025 season after the original ownership was evicted from their planned home arena. On April 17, 2025, the Kansas City Goats relocated to St. Joseph and rebranded as the St. Joseph Goats, after an ownership group led by Garage Beer and its owners Jason Kelce and Travis Kelce purchased the team.

The defending champion Duluth Harbor Monsters left the league on September 24, 2025 to join Arena Football One as the Minnesota Monsters. On November 6, 2025, the league officially announced the addition of an expansion franchise in Memphis, Tennessee.

On April 11, 2026, the Iowa Woo were reported to move to the UNI-Dome for the 2026 season.

The Arkansas Diamonds left the league on August 15, 2026, after being awarded a franchise in the Indoor Football League.

== Rules ==
The field is traditional arena football size, measuring 50 yards (150 feet (45.72 m)) long and 85 feet wide enclosed by padded walls. Teams have 15-player rosters with the game played with six offensive players against six defensive players. The league follows a one-platoon system with offensive and defensive players playing both sides of the ball. There are no restrictions on defense. The play clock runs 20 seconds from the spotting of the ball, the same timing that the Canadian Football League used through 2025. No offensive huddles are allowed unless a timeout is called.

In the inaugural season it was six-man football, 6 on 6, all offensive players are eligible receivers with three players initially lined up in an offensive line position. The quarterback cannot run the ball past the line of scrimmage. The league uses the "double forward pass" rule, originating in the XFL, that allows two forward passes to be thrown on the same play so long as the second pass is from behind the line of scrimmage. In 2025 the league changed to 7 on 7, making the Center ineligible to catch a forward pass and instituting running lanes (inside the hash marks) that the QB must use if he wants to run the ball.

Kickoffs are replaced with a quarterback throwoff, with an onside conversion option available. All forms of kicking the ball are prohibited, including punts and field goals. In lieu of punting, the offensive team can choose to "surrender," which gives the opponent possession of the ball at their own 15-yard line.

For the inaugural season, 3 on-field football officials and 2 Sky-Judges were used to officiate the games. The league switched to 4 on-field officials and a 1 Sky-Judge in 2025. The coaches have 2 challenges per game and all scoring plays, turnovers, catch / no catch, line to gain involved and running lane violations are automatically reviewable. The Sky Judge has access to a monitor and 4-6 camera angles and communicates with the On-Field crew and the video production team to get the angles they need to make a decision.

== Teams ==
Team	City	Stadium	Capacity	Joined	Head coach
Eau Claire Axemen	Eau Claire, Wisconsin	Sonnentag Event Center	3,250	2025	Tae Brooks
Iowa Woo	Waterloo-Cedar Falls, Iowa	UNI-Dome	5,155	2024	Victor Mann
Monroe Greenheads	Monroe, Louisiana	Monroe Civic Center	7,600	2026	Terry Bowden
Nebraska Siege	Grand Island, Nebraska	BigIron Events Center	7,500	2026	Dominic Bramante
Ozarks Lunkers	Springfield, Missouri	Wilson Logistics Arena	4,500	2024	Cam Bruffett
St. Joseph Goats	St. Joseph, Missouri	St. Joseph Civic Arena	3,800	2024	Dorsey Golston III

=== Former teams ===
- Arkansas Diamonds – Left TAL after 2026 season for the Indoor Football League.
- Duluth Harbor Monsters – Left TAL after 2025 season for the Arena Football One.
- Memphis Hound Dogs - Left TAL after 2026 season for American Arena League.

== Season format ==
The inaugural season of The Arena League had a nine-week regular season schedule with each team receiving one bye week with playoffs to follow. The season ran from June to August 2024.

== ArenaMania ==
On April 6, 2024, the league announced that the championship game will be known as ArenaMania.

Results of ArenaMania games
Season	Game	Date	Winning team		Losing team		MVP	Site	Attendance
2024	I	August 10, 2024	Duluth Harbor Monsters	46	44	Iowa Woo	Hassan Brockman & Javonte Haynes	DECC Arena	N/A
2025	II	August 9, 2025	Duluth Harbor Monsters	56	27	Hot Springs Wiseguys	Ja'Vonte Johnson	DECC Arena	N/A
2026	III	August 8, 2026	St. Joseph Goats	52	30	Arkansas Diamonds	Timmy McClain & Dawandrick Crockett	St. Joseph Civic Arena	N/A

== Media ==
TAL team media deals
Team	TV Station(s)	Radio Station(s)	Notes
Eau Claire Axemen	WEAU	WCFW	
Iowa Woo	KCRG-TV		(Note: The team is partnered with KWWL as the exclusive news source.)
Monroe Greenheads			
Nebraska Siege			
Ozarks Lunkers	KYTV		
St. Joseph Goats		KFEQ	

== Business ==
Former IFL Commissioner, Tommy Benizio, an advisor for the league and his corporation will operate and run the teams until, he hopes, business leaders in the community decide they want to be a part of it and own and operate a team. The league would later announce owners for all four locations. In late 2024, Benizio announced the launch of the Entertainment Football Association, which was to follow identical rules to TAL but with a separate schedule and geographic footprint centered on the Eastern Seaboard, with another Hall of Famer, Andre Reed, as commissioner of that league.

On December 4, 2023, former Dallas Desperados executive Ronnie Davis was appointed as Deputy Commissioner.

J. R. Bond leads a small group financing the league; Bond is a political advisor in Kansas City and has served as owner of several professional sports teams including the Sioux City Bandits, Topeka Tropics, and Topeka Golden Giants.

The league's business structure was designed in such a way to make it impossible for a team to leave the league. In practice, the structure was circumvented, and as of October 2026, three TAL franchises have moved to other leagues. League attempts to enforce this structure through lawsuits have thus far been unsuccessful.

=== Personnel ===
- Tim Brown – Commissioner and League Chairman
- Ronnie Davis – Deputy Commissioner
- Tommy Benizio – League advisor
- Dr. Michael Kuban – Director of Officials
- J. R. Bond – Financial Group Leader
