= SATO48 =

- Location: Springfield, Missouri, United States
- Founded: 2006
- Founded by: Jeff Clinkenbeard; Kyaw Tha Hla
- Website: www.sato48.com

SATO48 (short for Springfield And The Ozarks 48-Hour Film Challenge) is an annual nonprofit, 48-hour filmmaking competition based in Springfield, Missouri. Teams receive a surprise “Inspiration Package” and then have 48 hours to write, shoot, and edit a short film for public screenings and juried recognition. The event culminates in a red-carpet Recognition & Awards Ceremony at the historic Gillioz Theatre.

== History ==
SATO48 was created by Jeff Clinkenbeard and Kyaw Tha Hla in 2006, after participating in a similar 48-hour event in Albany, New York. With community support and seed funding, the pair launched a regional competition that has since become a Springfield tradition. Local coverage has referred to SATO48’s awards night as the “Oscars of the Ozarks.”

== Mission and programs ==
The organization operates as a 501(c)(3) and states a mission to nurture filmmaking talent in the Ozarks through its flagship 48-hour challenge and related programs (including FiveFest, public screenings, and development opportunities).

== Venues ==
As of 2025, SATO48 premiere screenings are held at Moxie Cinema and at the College Station Theaters in downtown Springfield, with the Recognition & Awards Ceremony at the Gillioz Theatre. The Moxie lists dedicated SATO48 screening blocks on its schedule, and has hosted SATO48 programming in prior years as well.

== 2025 timeline ==
The 20th-anniversary 2025 cycle included a late-May screening run at the Moxie and College Station, followed by the awards ceremony at the Gillioz Theatre on 31 May 2025 (doors 5:00 p.m., show 6:00 p.m.). The Moxie’s listing advertised multiple nightly blocks for SATO48 (2025).

== Recognition and awards ==
The event combines audience balloting and international judging to recognize achievements across categories at the Gillioz Theatre. Local reporting highlights the competition’s scale and community impact, with dozens of teams participating annually.

== Notable participants and judges ==
- Dana Powell, a Missouri native best known for Modern Family, has been involved with SATO48 as an international judge and workshop leader, and received the Gillioz Center for Arts & Entertainment Award for Lead Performance at the 2025 ceremony (for Robo).
