= Fantastic Caverns =

Cave in Missouri, United States

Coordinates: 37.287387°N 93.358501°W

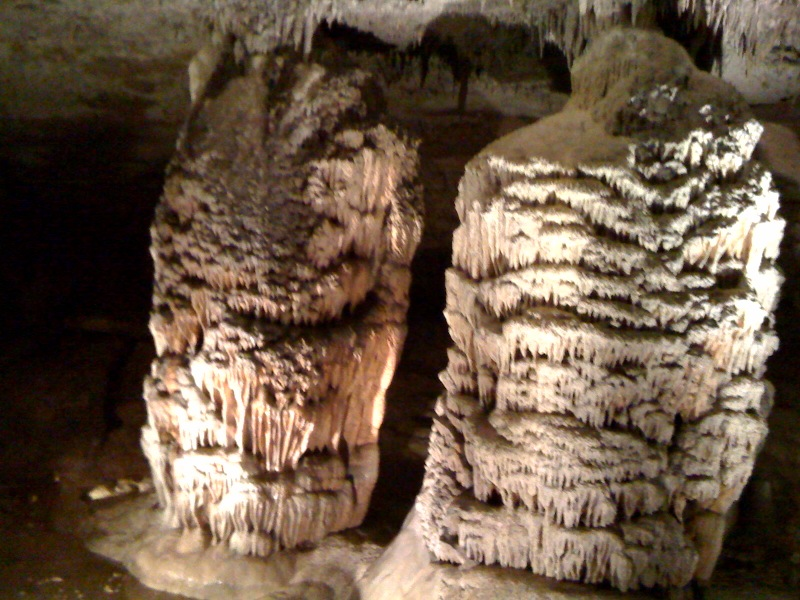
These two large stalagmites were named "The Hall of Giants" by the first explorers, a group of twelve women, who discovered them in 1867 at Fantastic Caverns.

Fantastic Caverns is a show cave located in Springfield, Missouri. Fantastic Caverns is the only cave in North America to offer a completely ride-through tour, which lasts 55 minutes and is held in a Jeep-drawn tram. The trams drive along the path left behind by an ancient underground river.

== History ==
The cavern was discovered by John Knox and his hunting dog in 1862. Knox did not want the cave to be exploited by the Union or Confederate governments as a possible source of saltpeter, so he kept the cave's existence quiet until 1867. Knox put an advertisement in the Springfield paper for someone to explore the cave, and it was first explored on February 14, 1867. On February 27, almost two weeks later, the Springfield Women's Athletic Club explored the cave. The twelve ladies are considered the first explorers of the cave, since they carved their names into the rock as graffiti and are mentioned in an article published in the Springfield Tri-Weekly Patriot newspaper. The cave was renamed "Fantastic Caverns" in the 1950s.

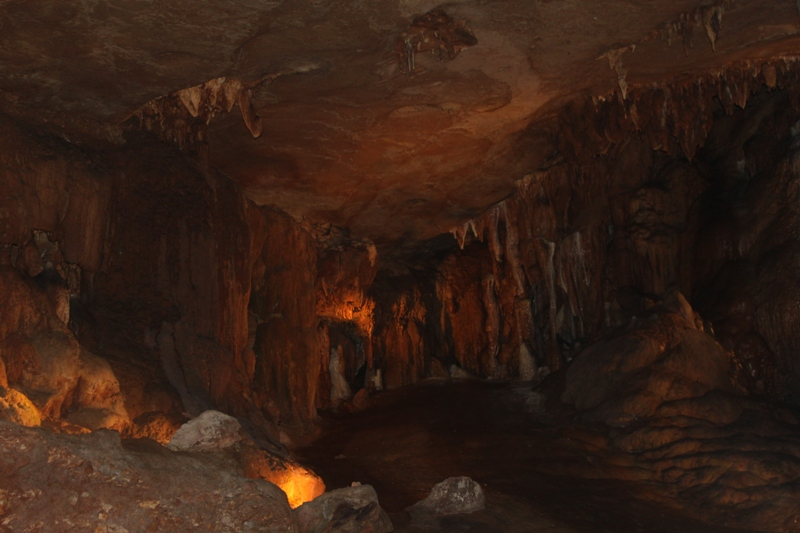
Interior of Fantastic Caverns. Photo by Matt Howry.

The cave was owned by the Ku Klux Klan from 1924 to 1930, during which they used the caverns as a meeting place.

The caverns were used as a speakeasy during Prohibition. The caverns also hosted music concerts during the 1950s and 1960s. The shows were broadcast on KGBX radio in the 1970s.

Fantastic Caverns was designated as a community fallout shelter in 1970 by the Greene County Office of Civil Defense.
