= Hammons Tower =

Office building in Springfield, Missouri

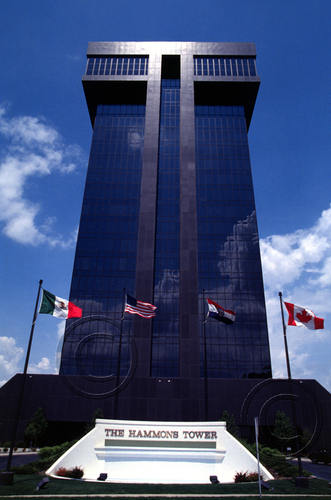
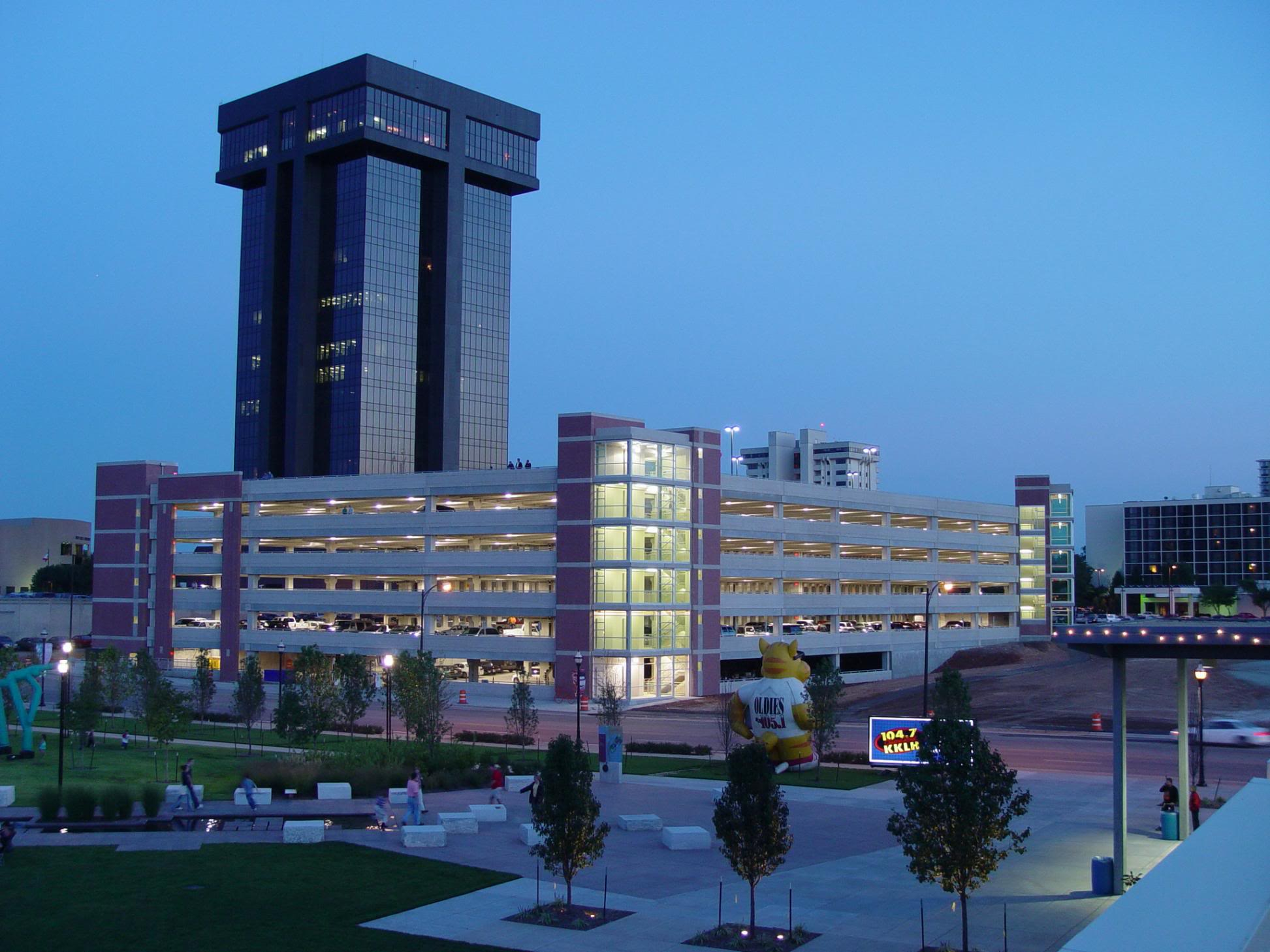
- Hammons Tower

- Location within Missouri Location within the United States

General information
- Status: Completed
- Type: Office
- Architectural style: Modern
- Location: 901 East St. Louis Street, Springfield, Missouri, United States
- Coordinates: 37°12′33″N 93°16′56″W
- Completed: 1987

Height
- Roof: 268 ft (82 m)

Technical details
- Floor count: 22

Design and construction
- Architect: Hood-Rich Architects

The Hammons Tower is a 268 ft (82 m) tall modern office building located on 901 East St. Louis Street in Downtown Springfield, Missouri. The building was built in 1987 and has 22 floors. Ever since its completion, it has been the tallest building in Springfield, surpassing the 233 ft (71 m) tall Sunvilla Tower, which was built in 1963. The building was designed by Hood-Rich Architects.

In 2024, documents were revealed that outlined a proposed purchase of the building and a few others by a development group from Atrium Hospitality, a company based in Georgia which owns and operates a part of the building under an agreement with J.D. Holdings LLC, which seized around 35 properties from John Q. Hammons Hotels & Resorts after they filed for bankruptcy in 2016.

== See also ==
- Springfield, Missouri
- List of tallest buildings in Missouri
