= College Station Theaters =

Locally owned movie theater in downtown Springfield, Missouri

- Former names: Hollywood Theatres – College Station Stadium 14; Regal College Station
- Location: 415 W. College St, Springfield, Missouri, U.S.
- Owner: Tillman Redevelopment, LLC (property); College Station Theater, LLC (operator)
- Type: Multiplex
- Screen: 14

Construction
- Reopened: November 22, 2024 (grand opening)

Website
- www.collegestationtheaters.com

College Station Theaters is a locally owned, first-run movie theater in downtown Springfield, Missouri. The venue originally opened in 2008 as Hollywood Theatres – College Station Stadium 14, was rebranded as Regal College Station in 2013, closed in January 2023, and reopened—after renovations—under local ownership in November 2024. It is located at the corner of Campbell Avenue and College Street—one block north of the Moxie Cinema, an arthouse venue on South Campbell.

== History ==
The complex opened on November 7, 2008 as Hollywood Theatres – College Station Stadium 14 as part of the College Station redevelopment project downtown. In May 2013, following Regal Entertainment Group’s acquisition of Hollywood Theatres, the site was rebranded as Regal College Station (also styled Regal College Station Stadium 14).

Regal announced it would close the downtown Springfield location at the start of 2023; the final day of operation was January 5, 2023.

Property owner Tillman Redevelopment created a new operating entity, College Station Theater, LLC, in 2024 and undertook upgrades to reopen the venue as an independent, locally operated theater. A soft opening occurred in mid-November 2024, followed by a grand opening celebration on November 22, 2024.

== Facilities and operations ==
Renovations emphasized technology and comfort, including installation of Dolby Atmos audio in select auditoriums, laser projection, and heated reclining seats. Ten of the building’s 14 auditoriums were fully renovated for the relaunch, with four left unrenovated for potential future expansion.

The theater also features partnerships with local businesses: a year-round Pineapple Whip stand occupies the former box-office area, and an arcade space is managed in collaboration with downtown’s 1984 Arcade.

== Location ==
College Station Theaters sits at 415 W. College Street, at the corner of College Street and Campbell Avenue, with two free parking garages immediately across those streets. The venue is one block north of the Moxie Cinema on South Campbell Avenue, placing the city’s locally owned/operated, first-run multiplex and arthouse venues within easy walking distance of each other.

== See also ==
- Moxie Cinema
