= Springfield, Missouri =

- City
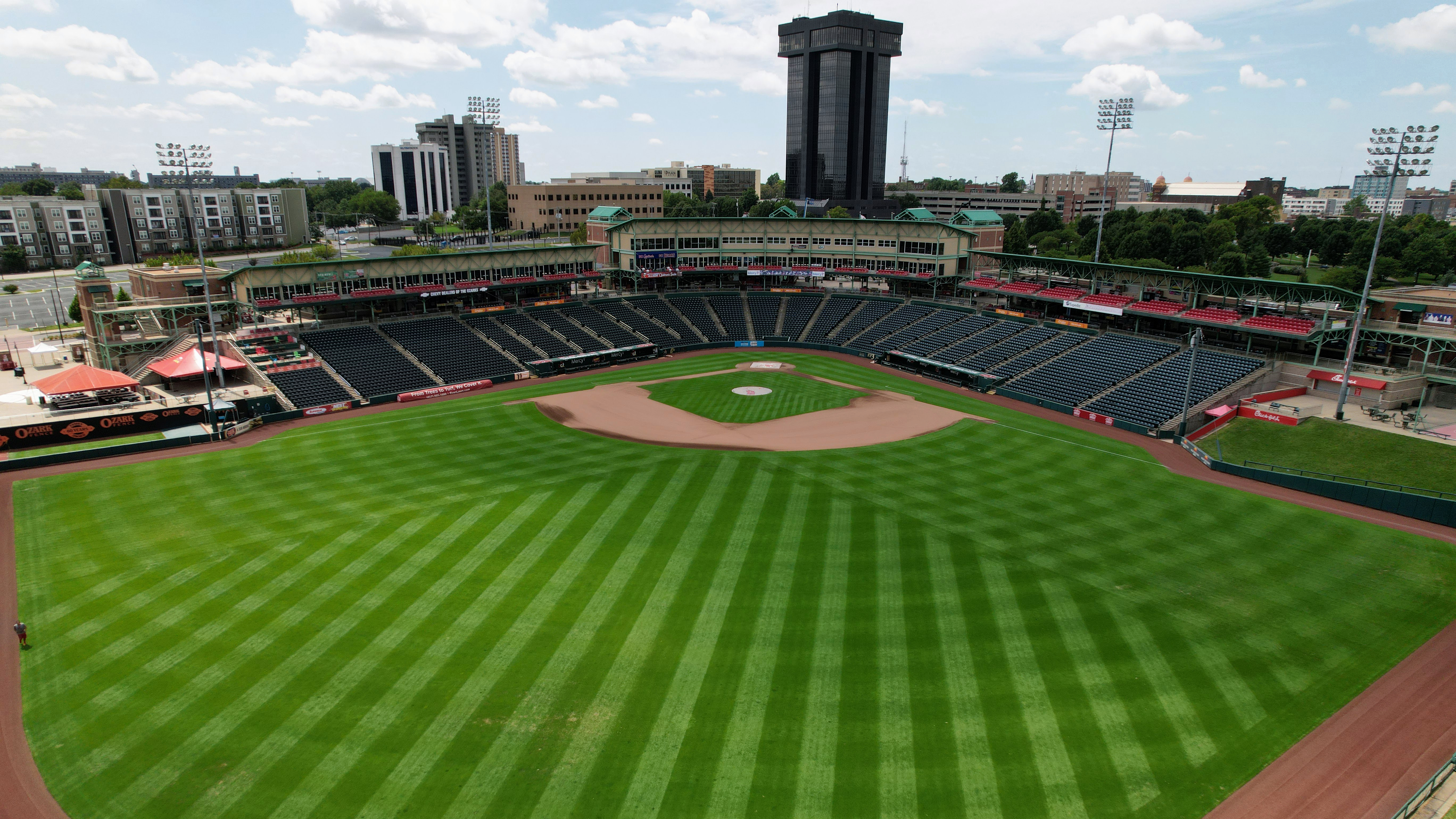
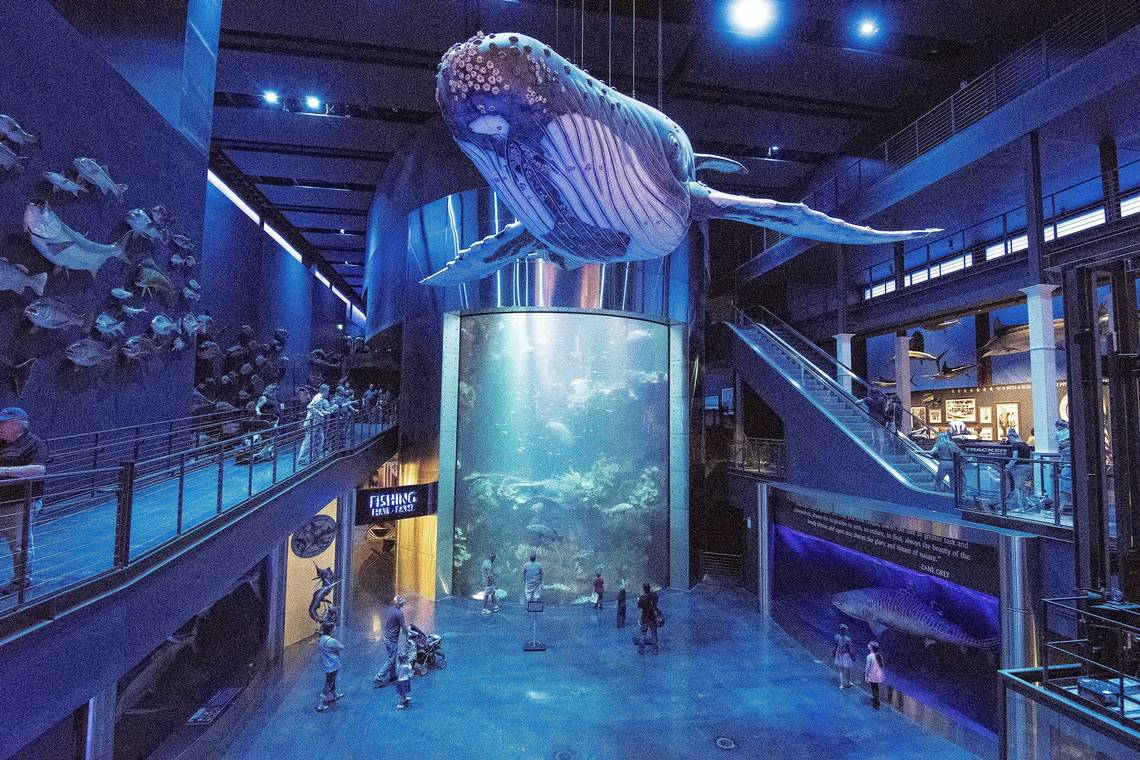
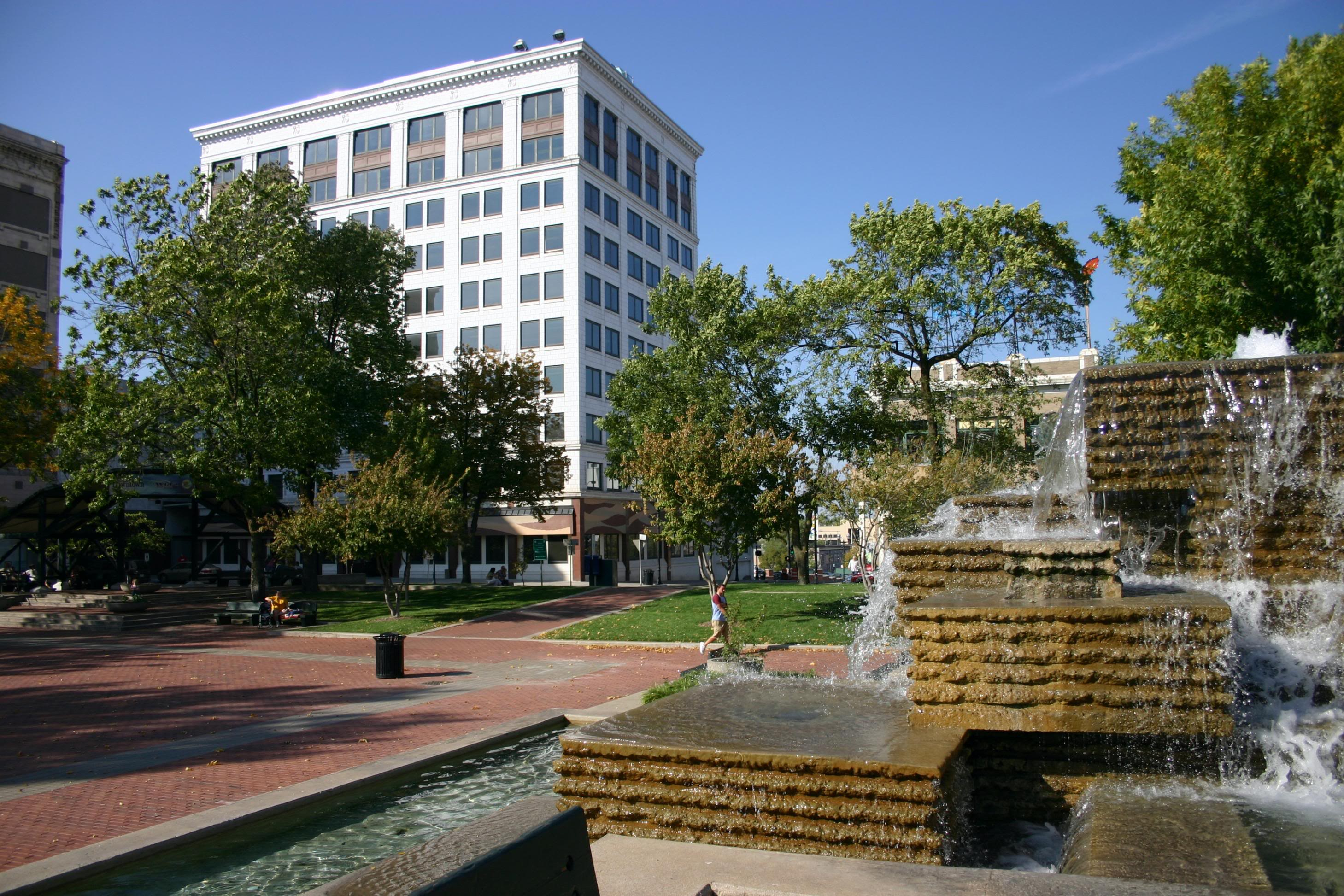
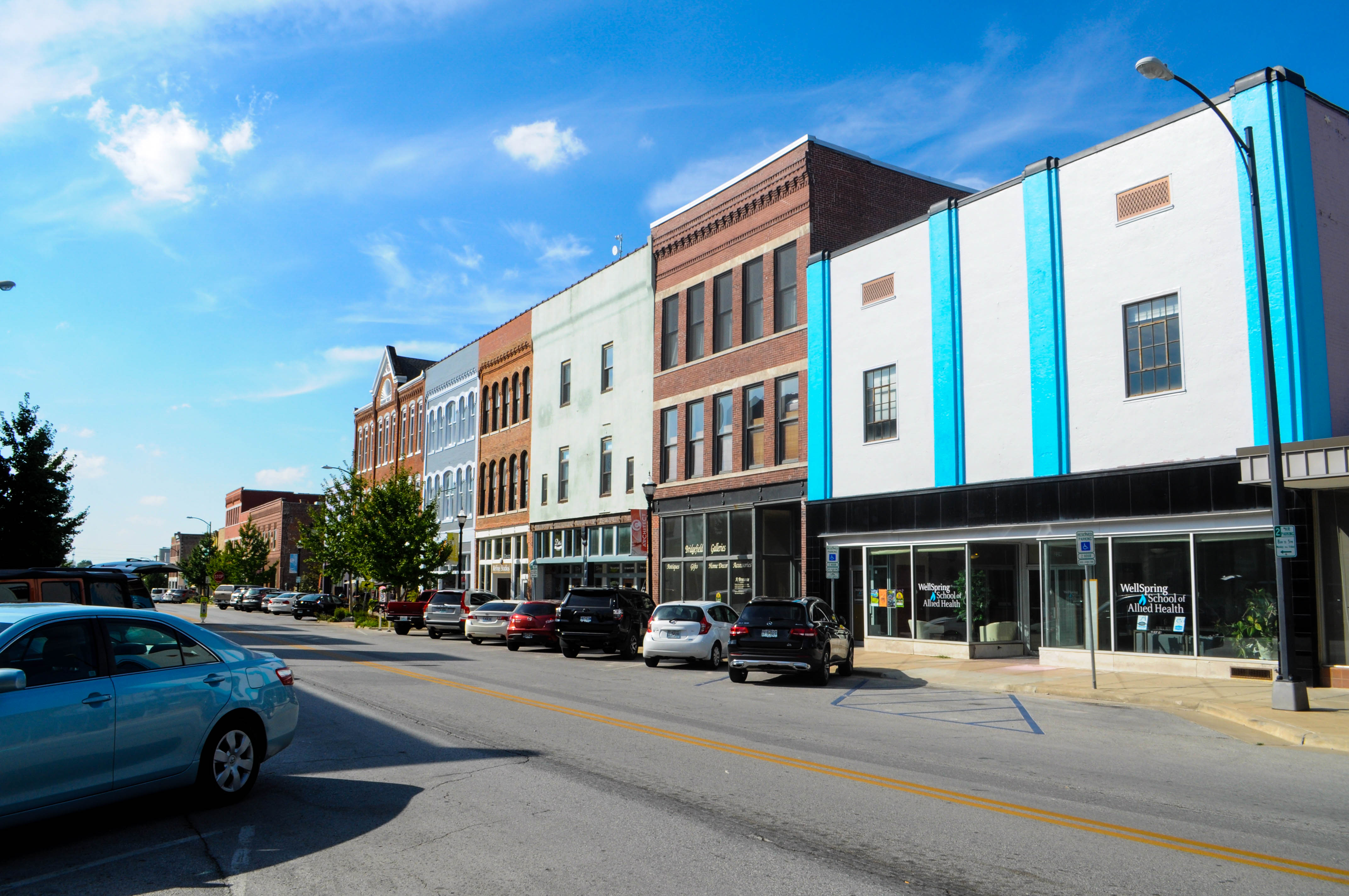
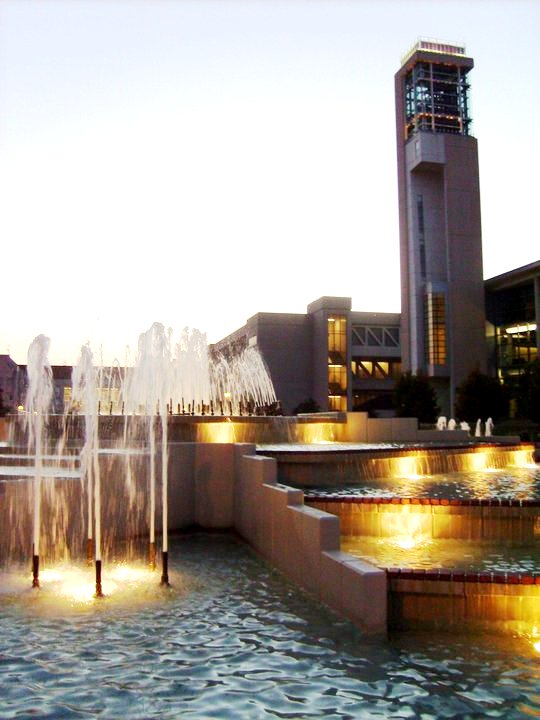
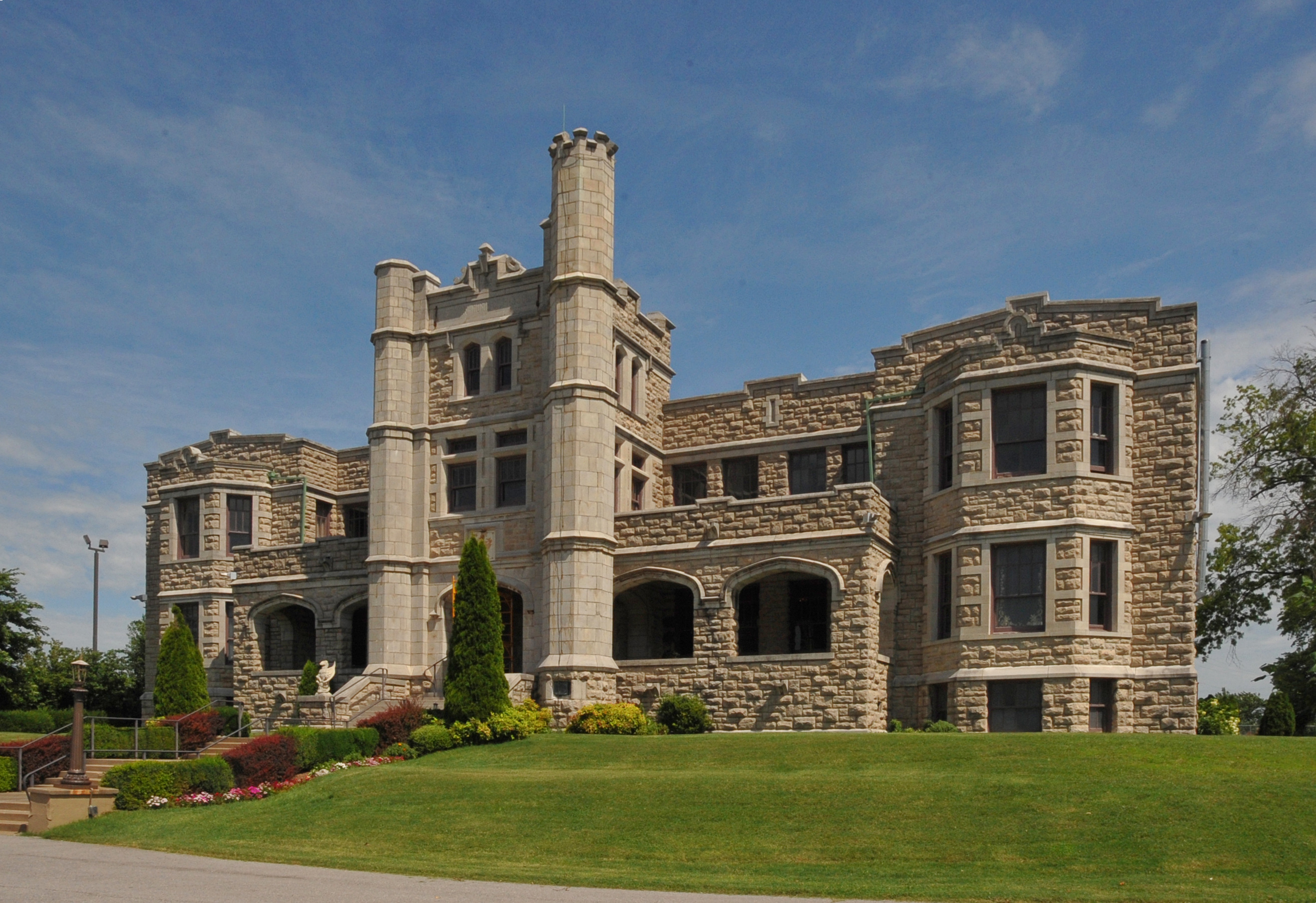
- Route 66 Stadium and Downtown Springfield Wonders of Wildlife Park Central Square Commercial Street Missouri State University Pythian Castle

- Flag Logo
- Nicknames: The "Queen City of the Ozarks" "Birthplace of Route 66” “SpringMO” “SpringVegas”
- Interactive map of Springfield, Missouri
- Location within Missouri Location within the United States
- Coordinates: 37°12′55″N 93°17′54″W
- Country: United States
- State: Missouri
- Counties: Greene; Christian
- District: MO-7
- Founded: 1834
- Incorporated: 1838

Government
  - Type: Council–manager
  - Mayor: Jeff Schrag

Area
  - City: 83.70 sq mi (216.78 km^{2})
  - Land: 83.11 sq mi (215.26 km^{2})
  - Water: 0.59 sq mi (1.52 km^{2})
  - Metro: 3,021 sq mi (7,824 km^{2})
- Elevation: 1,299 ft (396 m)

Population (2020)
  - City: 169,176
  - Estimate (2024): 170,596
  - Rank: US: 152nd
  - Density: 2,035.5/sq mi (785.91/km^{2})
  - Urban: 282,651 (US: 143rd)
  - Urban density: 2,104/sq mi (812.4/km^{2})
  - Metro: 475,432 (US: 111th)
- Demonym: Springfieldian
- Time zone: UTC−6 (CST)
  - Summer (DST): UTC−5 (CDT)
- ZIP codes: 65801-65810, 65814, 65817, 65890, 65897-65899
- Area code: 417
- FIPS code: 29-70000
- GNIS feature ID: 0735864
- Website: springfieldmo.gov

Springfield is the third most populous city in the U.S. state of Missouri and the county seat of Greene County. The city's population was 169,176 at the 2020 census. It is the principal city of the Springfield metropolitan area, which had an estimated population of 487,061 in 2022 and includes the counties of Christian, Dallas, Greene, Polk, and Webster. Springfield is the largest city in the Ozarks region, and sits on the Springfield Plateau, which ranges from nearly level to rolling hills.

Springfield's nicknames include "Queen City of the Ozarks" and "The Birthplace of Route 66". The city has been called the "Buckle of the Bible Belt" due to its association with evangelical Christianity. The city is the headquarters for Bass Pro Shops, Cabela's, and the adjoining Wonders of Wildlife Museum & Aquarium. It is also home to O'Reilly Auto Parts, which began as a family business with 13 employees in 1957. Springfield is close to Wilson's Creek National Battlefield and is along the national historic Trail of Tears. In 2020, Springfield's largest ethnicities were 87.6% white, 4% black, and 5% two or more races, placing it among the least diverse cities in the United States. The city is a regional center of medical care, with the two largest hospitals, CoxHealth and Mercy, being the largest employers in the city. Springfield hosts several universities and colleges, including Missouri State University, Drury University, and Evangel University. Springfield is an important regional center for distribution, logistics, and manufacturing.

== Toponymy ==
This flag of Springfield, Missouri, was used from 1938 to 2022.

The origin of the city's name is unclear, but the most common view is that it was named by migrants from Springfield, Massachusetts. One account is that James Wilson, who lived in the new settlement, offered free whiskey to anyone who would vote for the name Springfield, after his hometown in Massachusetts.

Springfield Express editor J. G. Newbill said in the November 11, 1881, issue: "It has been stated that this city got its name from the fact of a spring and field being near by just west of town. But such is not a correct version. When the authorized persons met and adopted the title of the 'Future Great' of the Southwest, several of the earliest settlers had handed in their favorite names, among whom was Kindred Rose, who presented the winning name in honor of his hometown, Springfield, Tennessee." In 1883, historian R. I. Holcombe wrote: "The town took its name from the circumstance of there being a spring under the hill, on the creek, while on top of the hill, where the principal portion of the town lay, there was a field."

== History ==
=== Early settlement ===
Native American peoples had long lived in this area. In the 1830s, the native Osage Nation, the Kickapoo from Indiana, and the Lenape (Delaware) from the mid-Atlantic coast had settled in this general area trying to evade encroachment by European Americans on their lands. The Osage had been the dominant tribe for more than one century in the larger region.

On the southeastern side of the town in 1812, about 500 Kickapoo built a small village of about 100 wigwams. They abandoned the site in 1828.

Ten miles south of the site of Springfield, the Lenape had built a substantial community of houses that borrowed elements of Anglo colonial style from the mid-Atlantic, where some of their people had migrated from.

The first European-American settlers to the area were John Polk Campbell and his brother, who reached this area in 1829 from Tennessee. Campbell chose the area because of the presence of a natural well that flowed into a small stream. He staked his claim by carving his initials in a tree. Campbell was joined by settlers Thomas Finney, Samuel Weaver, and Joseph Miller. They cleared the land of trees to develop it for farms. A small general store was soon opened.

In 1833, the southern part of the state was named Greene County after Revolutionary War hero General Nathanael Greene. Campbell Township was one of the seven original townships organized on March 11, 1833, when Greene County was much larger.

An 1876 map shows its boundaries include all the sections in T29N and R21 and 22W. It was bounded by Center Township on the west, Robberson, and Franklin Townships on the north, Taylor Township on the east, and Wilson and Clay Townships on the south. (Later, Campbell was split into Campbell No. 1 Township and Campbell No. 2 Township, then into North Campbell No. 1 Township, North Campbell No. 2 Township, and North Campbell No. 3 Township.)

The county seat of Springfield is located in Campbell Township due to the efforts of John Polk Campbell. The township is named after John Polk Campbell, who donated the land for Springfield's public square and platted the town site. In 1835 he deeded 50 acres of land to the legislature for the creation of a county seat. Campbell laid out city streets and lots. The town was incorporated in 1838. In 1878, the town got its nickname as the "Queen City of the Ozarks".

The United States government enforced Indian removal during the 1830s, forcing land cessions in the Southeast and other areas, and relocating tribes from east of the Mississippi River to Indian Territory. This later developed as the state of Oklahoma in 1907.

During the 1838 relocation of most of the Cherokee, the Trail of Tears passed through Springfield to the west, along the Old Wire Road.

=== Civil War ===
By 1861, Springfield's population had grown to approximately 2,000, and it had become an important commercial hub. In the late 1850s, telegraph lines, previously connected only as far as St. Louis, reached Springfield. News from points further west was brought to Springfield overland. It was sent by telegraph to what was then called the New York Associated Press.

At the start of the American Civil War, Springfield was divided in its loyalty. It had been settled by people from both the North and South, including slaveholders. It also attracted many German immigrants in the mid-19th century, who tended to support the Union.

The Union and Confederate armies both recognized the city's strategic importance and sought to control it. They fought the Battle of Wilson's Creek on August 10, 1861, a few miles southwest of town. The battle was a Confederate victory, and Nathaniel Lyon was killed here, the first Union General to die in the Civil War. Union troops retreated to the nearby town of Lebanon to regroup. When they returned, they found that most of the Confederate army had withdrawn.

On October 25, 1861, Union Major Charles Zagonyi led an attack against the remaining Confederates in the area, in a battle known as the First Battle of Springfield, or Zagonyi's Charge. Zagonyi's men removed the Confederate flag from Springfield's public square and returned to camp. It was the only Union victory in southwestern Missouri in 1861. The increased military activity in the area set the stage for the Battle of Pea Ridge in northern Arkansas in March 1862.

On January 8, 1863, Confederate forces under General John S. Marmaduke advanced to take control of Springfield and an urban fight ensued. But that evening, the Confederates withdrew. This became known as the Second Battle of Springfield. Marmaduke sent a message to the Union forces asking that Confederate casualties have a proper burial. The city remained under Union control for the remainder of the war. The US army used Springfield as a supply base and central point of operation for military activities in the area.

Promptly after the Civil War ended on July 21, 1865, Wild Bill Hickok shot and killed Davis Tutt in a shootout over a disagreement about a debt Tutt claimed Hickok owed him. During a poker game at the former Lyon House Hotel, in response to the disagreement over the amount, Tutt had taken Hickok's watch, which Hickok immediately demanded be returned. Hickok warned that Tutt had better not be seen wearing that watch, then spotted him wearing it in Park Central Square, prompting the gunfight.

On January 25, 1866, Hickok was still in Springfield when he witnessed a Springfield police officer, John Orr, shoot and kill James Coleman after Coleman interfered with the arrest of Coleman's friend Bingham, who was drunk and disorderly. Hickok provided testimony in the case. Orr was arrested, released on bail, and immediately fled the country. He was never brought to trial or heard from again.

=== Race relations ===
==== Lynchings ====
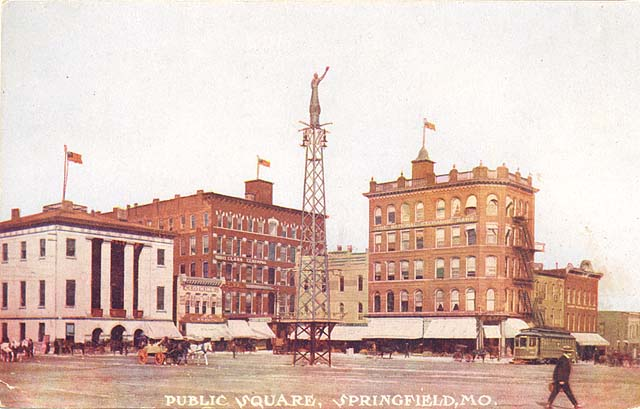
Gottfried Tower, center, where Horace Duncan, Fred Coker, and Will Allen were lynched

From the period after Reconstruction into the early 20th century, lynchings of freedmen and their descendants occurred in some cities and counties in Missouri, particularly in former slaveholding areas.

On April 14, 1906, a white mob broke into the Springfield county jail, and lynched two black men, Horace Duncan and Fred Coker, for allegedly sexually assaulting Mina Edwards, a white woman. Later they returned to the jail, where other African-American prisoners were being held, and pulled out Will Allen, who had been accused of murdering a white man. All three suspects were hanged from the Gottfried Tower, which held a replica of the Statue of Liberty.

Their bodies were burned in the courthouse square by a mob of more than 2,000 white residents. Judge Azariah W. Lincoln called for a grand jury, but no one was prosecuted. The proceedings were covered by national newspapers, including the New York Times and Los Angeles Times.

Duncan's and Coker's employer testified that they were at his business at the time of the crime against Edwards, and other evidence suggested that they and Allen were all innocent. These three are the only recorded lynchings in Greene County.

The extrajudicial murders were part of a pattern of discrimination, repeated violence and intimidation of African Americans in this city and southwest Missouri from 1894 to 1909, in an attempt to expel them from the region. Whites in the bordering Lawrence County also lynched three African-American men in this period. After the mass lynching in Springfield, many African Americans left the region.

A historic plaque on the southeast corner of the Springfield courthouse square commemorates Duncan, Coker, and Allen, the three victims of mob violence.

=== Country music ===
Four nationally broadcast television series originated from the city between 1955 and 1961: Ozark Jubilee and its spin-off, Five Star Jubilee; Talent Varieties; and The Eddy Arnold Show. All were carried live by ABC, except for Five Star Jubilee, on NBC. They were produced by Springfield's Crossroads TV Productions, owned by Ralph D. Foster, Si Siman, Lester E. Cox, and John Mahaffey.

Many of the biggest names in country music frequently visited or lived in Springfield at the time. City officials estimated the programs meant about 2,000 weekly visitors and "over $1,000,000 in fresh income."

Staged at the Jewell Theatre (demolished in 1961), Ozark Jubilee is the first national country music TV show to feature top stars and attract a significant viewership. Five Star Jubilee, produced from the Landers Theatre, was the first network color television series to originate outside of New York City or Hollywood. Springfield's NBC affiliate, KYTV-TV (which helped produce the program), was not equipped to broadcast in color, and aired the show in black and white.

The ABC, NBC and Mutual radio networks all carried country music shows nationally from Springfield during the decade, including KWTO'S Korn's-A-Krackin' (Mutual).

Si Siman was an influential figure in the development of Springfield's local recording industry, establishing several record labels and music publishing companies. In collaboration with Ronnie Self, he founded Scratch Records, Skipper Records, and Table Rock Music.

=== Ozark Hillbilly Medallion ===
The Springfield Chamber of Commerce once presented visiting dignitaries with an "Ozark Hillbilly Medallion" and a certificate proclaiming the honoree a "hillbilly of the Ozarks". On June 7, 1953, U.S. President Harry Truman received the medallion after a breakfast speech at the Shrine Mosque for a reunion of the 35th Division. Other recipients included US Army generals Omar Bradley and Matthew Ridgway, US Representative Dewey Short, J. C. Penney, Johnny Olson, Ralph Story and disc jockey Nelson King.

=== Modern era ===
In 1987, the current tallest building in Springfield finished construction: Hammons Tower, a 22-story commercial building.

== Geography ==
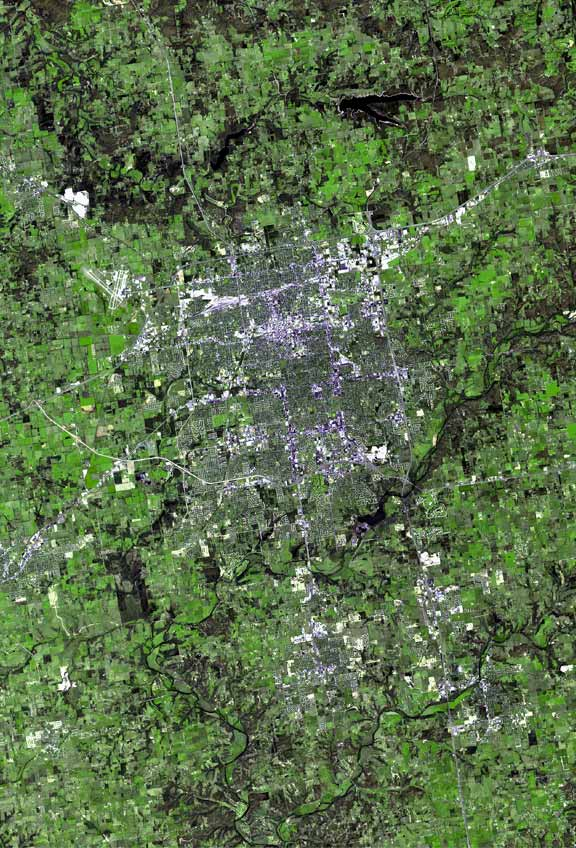
Satellite view of Springfield

Springfield is on the Springfield Plateau of the Ozarks region of southwest Missouri. According to the United States Census Bureau, the city has a total area of 82.31 square miles (213.2 square kilometres), of which 81.72 square miles (211.7 square kilometres) is land and 0.59 square miles (1.5 square kilometres) (0.7%) is water.

The city of Springfield is mainly flat with rolling hills and cliffs surrounding its south, east, and north sections. Springfield is on the Springfield Plateau, which reaches from Northwest Arkansas to Central Missouri. Most of the plateau is characterized by forest, pastures and shrub-scrub habitats. Many streams and tributaries, such as the James River, Galloway Creek and Jordan Creek, flow within or near the city. Nearby lakes include Table Rock Lake, Stockton Lake, McDaniel Lake, Fellows Lake, Lake Springfield, and Pomme de Terre Lake. Springfield is near the population center of the United States, about 80 miles (130 km) to the east.

=== Climate ===
Springfied, Missouri

Climate chart (precipitation, max. and min. temperature)
J	F	M	A	M	J	J	A	S	O	N	D
2.5 44 24	2.4 50 28	3.5 59 36	4.7 68 46	5.6 76 56	4.5 85 65	3.9 90 69	3.6 89 67	4.3 81 59	3.6 70 47	3.6 57 36	2.6 47 28
- █ Average max. and min. temperatures in °F
- █ Precipitation totals in inches
Metric conversion
J	F	M	A	M	J	J	A	S	O	N	D
65 7 −4	61 10 −2	89 15 2	120 20 8	141 25 13	114 30 18	98 32 20	91 32 20	109 27 15	91 21 9	90 14 2	66 8 −2
- █ Average max. and min. temperatures in °C
- █ Precipitation totals in mm

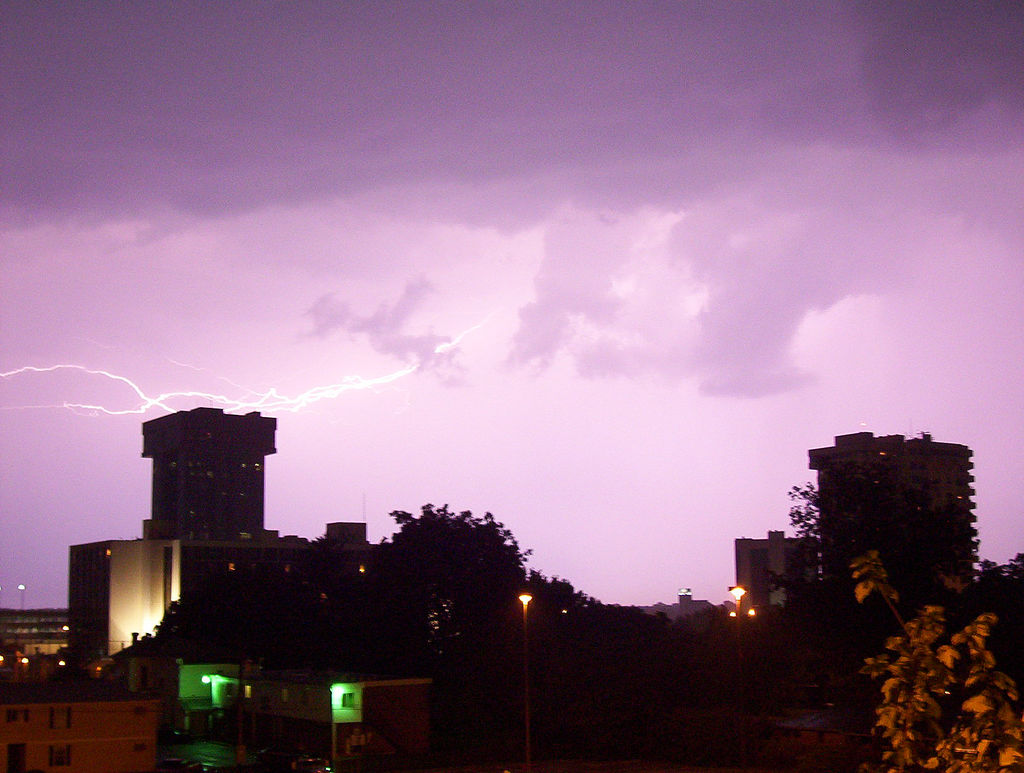
Lightning covers downtown Springfield.

Springfield has an average surface wind velocity comparable to that of Chicago, according to information compiled at the National Climatic Data Center at NOAA. It is placed within "Power Class 3" in the Wind Energy Resource Atlas published by a branch of the U.S. Department of Energy; having an average wind speed range of 6.4 to 7.0 miles per hour.

Springfield lies in the northern limits of a humid subtropical climate (Cfa), as defined by the Köppen climate classification system. As such, it experiences times of exceptional humidity; especially in late summer. The monthly daily average temperature ranges from 34.3 °F (1.3 °C) in January to 79.2 °F (26.2 °C) in July. On average, there are 40 days with high temperatures of 90 °F (32 °C) or greater, 2 days of 100 °F (38 °C) or greater, 15 days where the high temperature fails to rise above freezing, and 1.3 nights of lows at or below 0 °F (−18 °C) per year. It has an average annual precipitation of 44.71 inches (1,140 mm), including an average 13.70 inches (34.8 cm) of snow. Extremes in temperature range from −29 °F (−34 °C) on February 12, 1899 up to 113 °F (45 °C) on July 14, 1954.

According to the 2007 Forbes list of "America's Wildest Weather Cities" and the Weather Variety Index, Springfield is the city with the most varied weather in the United States. On May 1, 2013, Springfield reached a high temperature of 81 degrees Fahrenheit. By the evening of May 2, snow was falling, persisting into the following day and eventually accumulating to about two inches. This was only the second instance of measurable May snowfall in Springfield since record keeping began in 1888.

Climate data for Springfield–Branson National Airport, Missouri (1991−2020 normals, (Note: Mean monthly maxima and minima (i.e. the highest and lowest temperature readings during an entire month or year) calculated based on data at said location from 1991 to 2020.) extremes 1888−present (Note: Official records for Springfield were kept at downtown from January 1888 to December 1939, Downtown Airport from January 1940 to July 1940, and at Springfield–Branson National Airport since August 1940. For more information, see ThreadEx.))
Month	Jan	Feb	Mar	Apr	May	Jun	Jul	Aug	Sep	Oct	Nov	Dec	Year
Record high °F (°C)	76 (24)	84 (29)	92 (33)	93 (34)	95 (35)	101 (38)	113 (45)	108 (42)	104 (40)	93 (34)	83 (28)	77 (25)	113 (45)
Mean maximum °F (°C)	66.8 (19.3)	72.0 (22.2)	78.9 (26.1)	83.5 (28.6)	87.4 (30.8)	92.5 (33.6)	96.8 (36.0)	98.2 (36.8)	92.6 (33.7)	85.0 (29.4)	74.7 (23.7)	67.4 (19.7)	99.1 (37.3)
Mean daily maximum °F (°C)	44.3 (6.8)	49.5 (9.7)	58.9 (14.9)	68.4 (20.2)	76.3 (24.6)	85.2 (29.6)	89.6 (32.0)	89.1 (31.7)	81.4 (27.4)	69.9 (21.1)	57.3 (14.1)	47.0 (8.3)	68.1 (20.1)
Daily mean °F (°C)	34.3 (1.3)	38.7 (3.7)	47.6 (8.7)	57.0 (13.9)	66.0 (18.9)	74.9 (23.8)	79.2 (26.2)	78.2 (25.7)	70.3 (21.3)	58.6 (14.8)	46.7 (8.2)	37.4 (3.0)	57.4 (14.1)
Mean daily minimum °F (°C)	24.2 (−4.3)	28.0 (−2.2)	36.2 (2.3)	45.6 (7.6)	55.6 (13.1)	64.6 (18.1)	68.8 (20.4)	67.3 (19.6)	59.1 (15.1)	47.3 (8.5)	36.2 (2.3)	27.8 (−2.3)	46.7 (8.2)
Mean minimum °F (°C)	3.5 (−15.8)	8.4 (−13.1)	15.9 (−8.9)	28.1 (−2.2)	38.9 (3.8)	51.8 (11.0)	58.3 (14.6)	55.5 (13.1)	42.7 (5.9)	29.3 (−1.5)	18.1 (−7.7)	8.1 (−13.3)	−1.0 (−18.3)
Record low °F (°C)	−19 (−28)	−29 (−34)	−8 (−22)	16 (−9)	29 (−2)	42 (6)	44 (7)	44 (7)	30 (−1)	18 (−8)	4 (−16)	−16 (−27)	−29 (−34)
Average precipitation inches (mm)	2.54 (65)	2.40 (61)	3.51 (89)	4.71 (120)	5.56 (141)	4.47 (114)	3.85 (98)	3.59 (91)	4.31 (109)	3.60 (91)	3.56 (90)	2.61 (66)	44.71 (1,136)
Average snowfall inches (cm)	4.4 (11)	3.3 (8.4)	2.0 (5.1)	0.1 (0.25)	0.0 (0.0)	0.0 (0.0)	0.0 (0.0)	0.0 (0.0)	0.0 (0.0)	0.0 (0.0)	0.6 (1.5)	3.3 (8.4)	13.7 (35)
Average precipitation days (≥ 0.01 in)	8.1	7.7	10.7	10.8	12.4	10.2	8.8	8.3	7.4	9.0	8.6	8.0	110.0
Average snowy days (≥ 0.1 in)	3.4	2.5	1.2	0.1	0.0	0.0	0.0	0.0	0.0	0.1	0.7	2.2	10.2
Average relative humidity (%)	68.3	68.5	65.2	64.5	70.7	72.3	70.4	69.5	72.9	68.2	69.6	70.9	69.3
Average dew point °F (°C)	20.8 (−6.2)	25.0 (−3.9)	33.1 (0.6)	43.0 (6.1)	53.8 (12.1)	62.4 (16.9)	65.8 (18.8)	63.9 (17.7)	58.1 (14.5)	45.3 (7.4)	35.1 (1.7)	25.5 (−3.6)	44.3 (6.8)
Mean monthly sunshine hours	167.6	157.4	208.7	236.4	268.0	282.7	321.6	292.1	237.6	217.3	155.1	145.9	2,690.4
Percentage possible sunshine	54	52	56	60	61	64	72	70	64	62	51	49	60
Source: NOAA (relative humidity, dew point, and sun 1961−1990)

== Demographics ==
Historical population
Census	Pop.	Note	%±
1850	415		—
1860	1,235		197.6%
1870	5,555		349.8%
1880	6,522		17.4%
1890	21,850		235.0%
1900	23,267		6.5%
1910	35,201		51.3%
1920	39,631		12.6%
1930	57,527		45.2%
1940	61,238		6.5%
1950	66,731		9.0%
1960	95,865		43.7%
1970	120,096		25.3%
1980	133,116		10.8%
1990	140,494		5.5%
2000	151,580		7.9%
2010	159,498		5.2%
2020	169,176		6.1%
2024 (est.)	170,596		0.8%
U.S. Decennial Census; 2022 Estimate

=== 2020 census ===
The 2020 United States census counted 169,176 people, 78,027 households, and 37,297 families in Springfield. The population density was 2,035.6 per square mile (785.9/km^{2}). There were 83,116 housing units at an average density of 1,000.1 units per square mile (386.1 units/km^{2}).

The U.S. Census accounts for race by two methodologies: "Race alone" where Hispanics are allocated to the various racial categories and "Race alone less Hispanics" where Hispanics are excluded from the racial categories and delineated separately as if a separate race.

According to the 2020 United States census, the racial makeup (including Hispanics in the racial counts) was 81.12% (137,235) white alone, 4.77% (8,063) black or African-American alone, 0.79% (1,334) Native American or Alaska Native alone, 2.28% (3,853) Asian alone, 0.18% (304) Pacific Islander alone, 2.21% (3,731) other race alone, and 8.66% (14,656) from two or more races.

According to the 2020 United States census, the racial and ethnic makeup (where Hispanics are excluded from the racial counts and placed in their own category) was 79.38% (134,294) White alone (non-Hispanic), 4.66% (7,877) Black alone (non-Hispanic), 0.63% (1,074) Native American alone (non-Hispanic), 2.25% (3,809) Asian alone (non-Hispanic), 0.16% (276) Pacific Islander alone (non-Hispanic), 0.41% (699) other race alone (non-Hispanic), 6.63% (11,221) multiracial or mixed-race (non-Hispanic), and 5.87% (9,926) Hispanic or Latino.

Of the 78,027 households, 19.4% had children under the age of 18; 33.1% were married couples living together; 33.6% had a female householder with no husband present. Of all households, 39.4% consisted of individuals and 13.9% had someone living alone who was 65 years of age or older. The average household size was 2.0 and the average family size was 2.7.

17.3% of the population was under the age of 18, 19.1% from 18 to 24, 25.9% from 25 to 44, 21.0% from 45 to 64, and 15.7% who were 65 years of age or older. The median age was 33.2 years. For every 100 females, the population had 93.0 males. For every 100 females ages 18 and older, there were 91.1 males.

The 2016–2020 5-year American Community Survey estimates show that the median household income was $37,491 (with a margin of error of +/- $1,212) and the median family income was $52,296 (+/- $1,594). Males had a median income of $28,927 (+/- $1,383) versus $23,395 (+/- $767) for females. The median income for those above 16 years old was $25,751 (+/- $590). Approximately, 12.8% of families and 21.7% of the population were below the poverty line, including 20.8% of those under the age of 18 and 12.1% of those ages 65 or over.

Springfield city, Missouri – Racial and ethnic composition Note: the US Census treats Hispanic/Latino as an ethnic category. This table excludes Latinos from the racial categories and assigns them to a separate category. Hispanics/Latinos may be of any race.
Race / ethnicity (NH = Non-Hispanic)	Pop 2000	Pop 2010	Pop 2020	% 2000	% 2010	% 2020
White alone (NH)	137,140	138,495	134,294	90.47%	86.83%	79.38%
Black or African American alone (NH)	4,863	6,397	7,877	3.21%	4.01%	4.66%
Native American or Alaska Native alone (NH)	1,088	1,076	1,074	0.72%	0.67%	0.63%
Asian alone (NH)	2,028	2,980	3,809	1.34%	1.87%	2.25%
Pacific Islander alone (NH)	129	254	276	0.09%	0.16%	0.16%
Some other race alone (NH)	225	116	699	0.15%	0.07%	0.41%
Mixed-race or multi-racial (NH)	2,606	4,329	11,221	1.72%	2.71%	6.63%
Hispanic or Latino (any race)	3,501	5,851	9,926	2.31%	3.67%	5.87%
Total	151,580	159,498	169,176	100.00%	100.00%	100.00%

=== 2010 census ===
In the 2010 United States census, there were 159,498 people, 69,754 households, and 35,453 families residing in the city. The population density was 1,951.8 inhabitants per square mile (753.6/km^{2}). There were 77,620 housing units at an average density of 949.8 units per square mile (366.7 units/km^{2}). The racial makeup of the city was 88.7% White, 4.1% African American, 0.8% Native American, 1.9% Asian, 0.2% Pacific Islander, 1.2% from other races, and 3.2% from two or more races. Hispanic or Latino people of any race were 3.7% of the population.

There were 69,754 households, of which 23.4% had children under the age of 18 living with them, 34.4% were married couples living together, 11.8% had a female householder with no spouse present, 4.7% had a male householder with no spouse present, and 49.2% were non-families. 37.3% of all households were made up of individuals, and 11.8% had someone living alone who was 65 years of age or older. The average household size was 2.13 and the average family size was 2.81.

The median age in the city was 33.2 years. 18.3% of residents were under the age of 18; 18.4% were between the ages of 18 and 24; 26% were from 25 to 44; 22.7% were from 45 to 64; and 14.5% were 65 years of age or older. The gender makeup of the city was 48.5% male and 51.5% female.

=== 2000 census ===
According to the 2000 United States census, 151,580 people, 64,691 households, and 35,709 families resided in the city. The population density was 2,072.0 inhabitants per square mile (800.0/km^{2}). There were 69,650 housing units at an average density of 952.1 units per square mile (367.6 units/km^{2}). The racial makeup of the city was 91.69% White, 3.27% African American, 0.75% Native American, 1.36% Asian, 0.09% Pacific Islander, 0.88% from other races, and 1.95% from two or more races. Hispanic or Latino people of any race were 2.31% of the population.

There were 64,691 households, out of which 24.0% had children under the age of 18 living with them, 40.7% were married couples living together, 10.9% had a female householder with no spouse present, and 44.8% were non-families. 35.3% of all households were made up of individuals, and 11.6% had someone living alone who was 65 years of age or older. The average household size was 2.17 and the average family size was 2.82. In the city 19.9% were under the age of 18, 17.4% from 18 to 24, 28.0% from 25 to 44, 19.8% from 45 to 64, and 14.9% were 65 years of age or older. The median age was 34 years. For every 100 females, there were 92.9 males. For every 100 females age 18 and over, there were 90.0 males.

The median income for a household in the city was $29,563, and the median income for a family was $38,114. Males had a median income of $27,778 versus $20,980 for females. The per capita income for the city was $17,711. About 9.9% of families and 15.9% of the population were below the poverty line, including 19.1% of those under age 18 and 7.9% of those age 65 or over.

=== Neighborhoods ===
Registered neighborhoods include University Heights, Bissett, Bradford Park, Delaware, Doling, Galloway, Grant Beach, Heart of the Westside, Midtown, Oak Grove, Parkcrest, Phelps Grove, Robberson, Rountree, Tom Watkins, Weller, West Central, Westside Community Betterment, and Woodland Heights.

Affiliated neighborhood groups unregistered with the city include:

- Chesterfield Village
- Cinnamon On The Hill
- Cinnamon Square
- Coachlight
- Cooper Estates
- Fox Grape
- Kay Pointe
- Kingsbury Forest
- Lakewood Village
- Mission Hills
- National Place
- Parkwest Village
- Parkwood Survival
- Quail Creek
- Ravenwood South
- Sherman Ave Project Area
- Spring Creek

== Economy ==
Springfield's economy is based on health care, manufacturing, retail, education, and tourism. In 2021, the city had a Gross Metropolitan Product of $19.49 billion, making up 6.6% of the Gross State Product of Missouri.

Total retail sales exceed $4.1 billion annually in Springfield and $5.8 billion in the Springfield MSA. Its largest shopping mall is Battlefield Mall. According to the Springfield Convention & Visitors Bureau, an estimated 3,000,000 overnight visitors and day-trippers annually visit the city. The city has more than 60 lodging facilities and 6,000 hotel rooms. The Convention & Visitors Bureau spends more than $1,000,000 annually marketing the city as a travel destination.

Andy's Frozen Custard, Bass Pro Shops, CoxHealth, BKD, Jack Henry, Loren Cook Co., Noble & Associates, and O'Reilly Auto Parts, Paul Mueller Co., Positronic, Prime Inc. and Springfield ReManufacturing all have national headquarters in Springfield. Two major American Christian denominations — General Council of the Assemblies of God in the United States of America (one of the largest of the Pentecostal denominations) and Baptist Bible Fellowship International (a fundamentalist Baptist denomination) — are headquartered in the city.

According to the Springfield Area Chamber of Commerce, these were the top 2023 employers in the metro:

#	Employer	Employees
1	CoxHealth	12,178
2	Mercy Health System	9,214
3	State of Missouri	5,411
4	Walmart and Sam's Club	4,981
5	Springfield Public Schools	3,685
6	Bass Pro Shops/Tracker Marine	2,989
7	O'Reilly Auto Parts (HQ)	2,631
8	United States Government	2,425
9	Jack Henry & Associates	2,349
10	Citizens Memorial Healthcare	2,038
11	Burrell Behavioral Health	1,872
12	Missouri State University	1,861
13	City of Springfield	1,857
14	SRC Holdings	1,750
15	EFCO	1,600

== Government ==
Springfield city vote by party in presidential elections
Year	Democratic	Republican	Third Parties
2020	48.70% 34,777	48.80% 34,871	2.50% 1,815
2016	40.30% 26,593	52.40% 34,603	7.20% 4,780

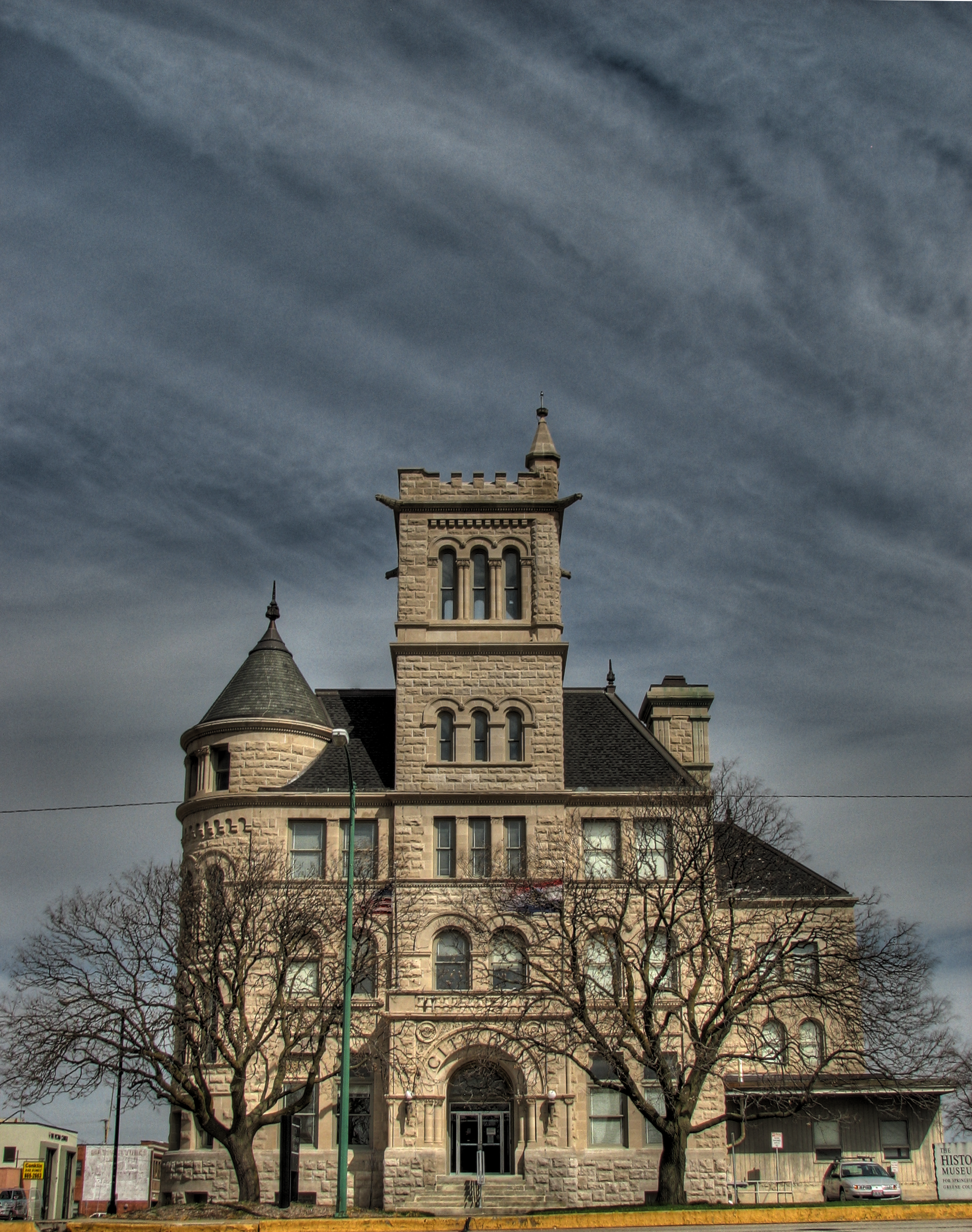
Springfield City Hall

Springfield's city government is based on the council–manager system. By charter, the city has eight council members, each elected for a four-year term on a nonpartisan basis, and a mayor elected for a four-year term. David Cameron, the city manager, appointed by the council, serves as the chief executive and administrative officer for the city and is responsible for directing the overall operations of the City of Springfield and for executing all policies and programs authorized by the city council. Anita Cotter, the city clerk, appointed by the council to serve as the chief of staff for City Council Members and Custodian of Records, coordinates and responds to all sunshine requests and maintains official city records, including minutes, ordinances, resolutions, contracts, and other vital documents. The presiding officer at council meetings is the mayor. Council meetings are held every other Monday night in city council chambers. City Council elections are held on the first Tuesday in April.

Springfield City Council
Office	Officeholder
Mayor	Jeff Schrag
General Seat A	Heather Hardinger
General Seat B	Craig Hosmer
General Seat C	Callie Carroll
General Seat D	Derek Lee
Zone 1	Monica Horton
Zone 2	Abe McGull
Zone 3	Brandon Jenson
Zone 4	Bruce Adib-Yazdi

City Utilities of Springfield (CU) is a city-owned utility serving the Springfield area with electricity, natural gas, water, telecommunications and transit services. CU provides service to over 115,000 electric, 84,000 natural gas, and 83,000 water customers.

== Education ==
Springfield has several universities, colleges, and high schools. Four of the main higher learning institutions, Missouri State University, Drury University, Evangel University, and Ozarks Technical Community College, are located in and around downtown Springfield.

=== Universities ===
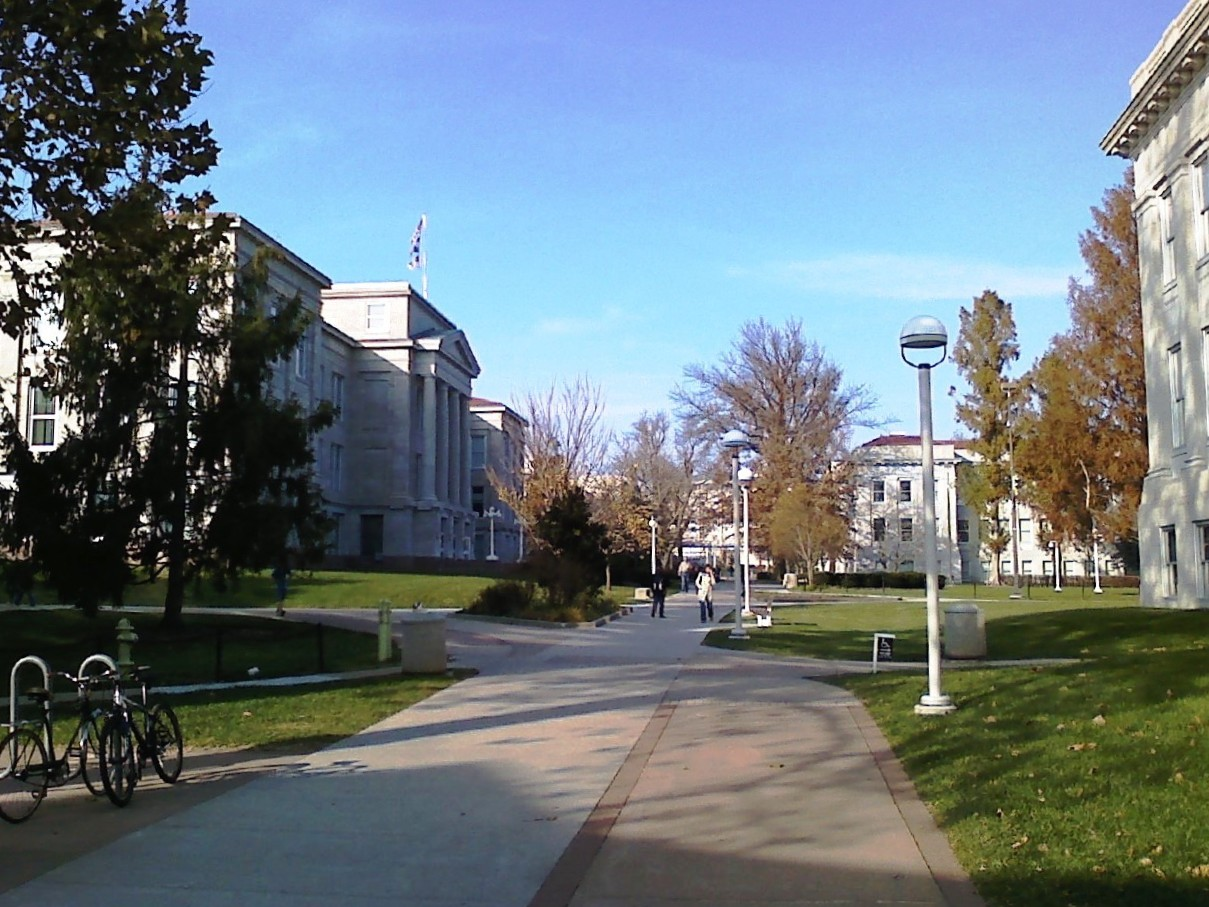
View toward Missouri State University's Historic Quadrangle

Founded in 1905 as the Fourth District Normal School, Missouri State University (MSU) is the state's second largest university by enrollment, with over 23,000 students.

Drury University is a private university with over 1,000 students Founded in 1873 by congregationalists, it is affiliated with the Christian Church (Disciples of Christ).

Evangel University, founded in 1955, is a private liberal arts university. In 2013, Central Bible College and the Assemblies of God Theological Seminary consolidated with the university. Evangel is affiliated with the Assemblies of God USA denomination.

The University of Missouri opened a clinical campus in 2016 of the University of Missouri School of Medicine.

Other branches include Mercy College of Nursing and Health Sciences (in partnership with Southwest Baptist University), Bryan University, Columbia College, and University of Phoenix.

=== Colleges ===
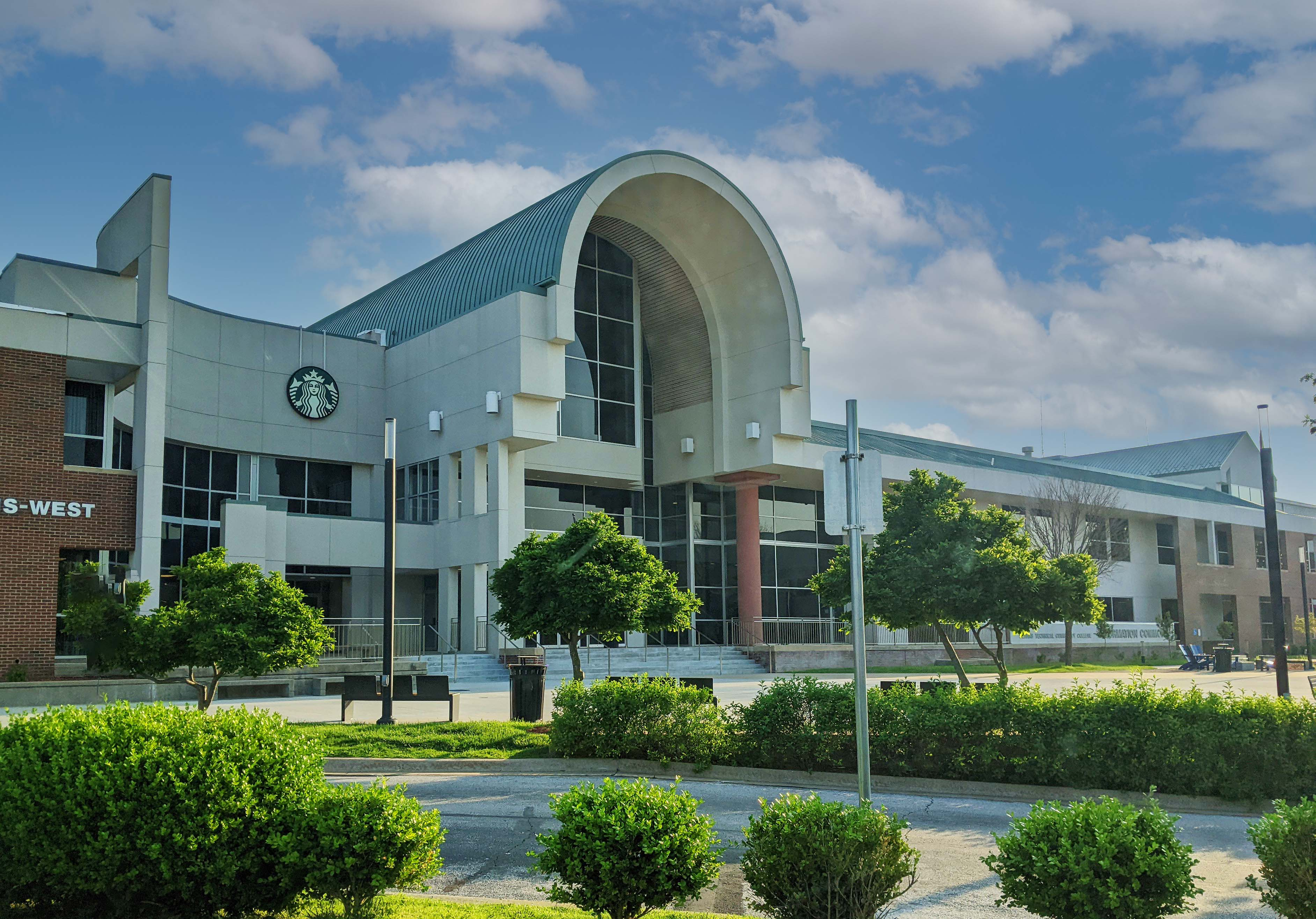
Ozarks Technical Community College

Ozarks Technical Community College (OTC) is the second largest college in the city of Springfield, having more than 11,000 students in attendance.

Other colleges in Springfield include Mission University (formerly Baptist Bible College) and Cox College (Nursing and Allied Health).

=== K-12 schools ===
The Springfield Public School District is the largest district in the state of Missouri. Public high schools include Central High School, Kickapoo High School, Hillcrest High School, Parkview High School, and Glendale High School.

While the majority of Springfield is in the Springfield school district, portions of the city limits are in other school districts: Willard R-II School District, Republic R-III School District, Strafford R-VI School District, and Logan-Rogersville R-VIII School District.

Private high schools include Springfield Sudbury School, Summit Preparatory School, Greenwood Laboratory School, New Covenant Academy, Springfield Catholic High School, Christian Schools of Springfield, and Grace Classical Academy.

== Parks and recreation ==
The Springfield-Greene County Park Board manages 3,200 acres and 103 sites, including the Nathanael Greene/Close Memorial Park, which contains the historic Gray-Campbell Farmstead, Mizumoto Japanese Stroll Garden, Master Gardener demonstration gardens, Doling Park, Bill Roston Native Butterfly House, and Springfield-Greene County Botanical Center; the Rutledge-Wilson Farm Community Park; the Mediacom Ice Park; the Cooper Park and Sports Complex; Fantastic Caverns, Dickerson Park Zoo; and various other public parks, community centers, and facilities.

The non-profit Ozark Greenways Inc. promotes trail recreation and local bicycling through the establishment of greenway trails, including a 35-mile crushed-gravel trail, the Frisco Highline Trail connecting Springfield to the town of Bolivar, and smaller trails connecting parks and sites of interest within the town and county.

The Missouri Department of Conservation operates the Springfield Nature Center and numerous nearby conservation areas.

The National Park Service operates the nearby Wilson's Creek National Battlefield.

Springfield's metropolitan area is situated within close distance of recreational lakes, waterways, caves, and forests, such as the James River, Busiek State Forest, Lake Springfield, Table Rock Lake, Buffalo National River, Ozark National Scenic Riverways, Fellows Lake, and Fantastic Caverns.

Doling Park was Springfield’s premiere recreational spot. In the late 1800s it offered entertainment, nature and attractions.

Brought to life by James M. Doling, and later his son Robert.

Doling Park was a place people could come enjoy the lake, skating rink, amusement rides, fireworks, picnics and a cool draft from Giboney Cave.

Before this Springfield didn’t have city parks.

== Culture ==
Like many cities across the nation, Springfield has seen a resurgence in its downtown area. Many of the older buildings have been, and are continuing to be, renovated into mixed-use buildings such as lofts, office space, restaurants, coffee shops, bars, boutiques, and music venues. The Downtown Springfield Community Improvement District (CID) has historic theaters that have been restored to their original state, including the Fox Theatre, the Gillioz Theatre and the Landers Theatre.

In 2001, Phase I of Jordan Valley Park opened along with the Jordan Valley Ice Park. 2001 also saw the opening of The Creamery Arts Center, a city-owned building inside Jordan Valley Park. Phase II of Jordan Valley Park was completed in 2012. It provides office and meeting space for arts organizations which serve the community. The center has been renovated to include two art galleries with monthly exhibitions, an Arts Library, rehearsal studios, and classrooms offering art workshops and hands-on activities. The facilities also include an outdoor classroom.

A March 2009 New York Times article described the history and ascendancy of cashew chicken in Springfield, where local variations of the popular Chinese dish are ubiquitous.

=== Cultural organizations ===
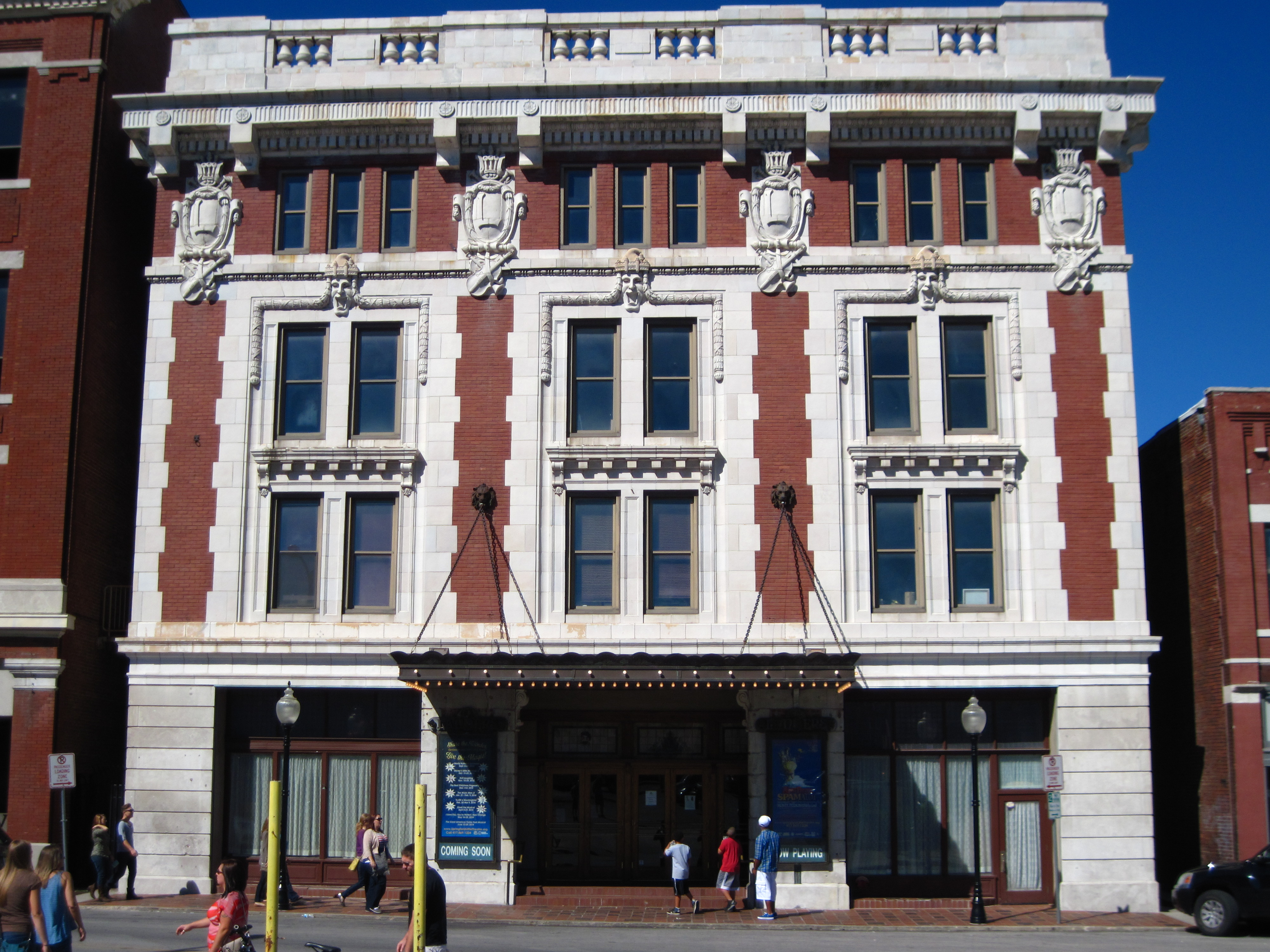
The Landers Theatre

The Ozarks Lyric Opera (formerly the Springfield Regional Opera) has operated in the city for nearly 40 years. In its history, the opera has performed various well known shows, such as The Barber of Seville, La bohème and Carmen.

The Springfield Ballet was founded in 1978 as a not-for-profit to bring ballet to the region. The first performance was held at the Springfield Art Museum in November 1976, and the first public performance in March 1977. The ballet currently performs at the Landers Theatre in downtown Springfield, and has performed with the Springfield Symphony for holiday programs.

The Springfield Little Theatre was founded in 1934 and purchased the Landers Theatre in 1970 for its permanent performance venue. The theatre is the oldest civic theatre in Missouri and one of the oldest in the Midwest, attended by 60,000 people yearly. The venue has been the setting for performances by actors such as Kathleen Turner, Tess Harper, and Lucas Grabeel.

The Springfield Symphony was founded in 1935 and is one of the oldest arts organizations in the city. The symphony was one of the founding members of the American Symphony Orchestra League, now known as the League of American Orchestras, the largest international body for symphonies and orchestras. The symphony performs monthly at Juanita K. Hammons Hall on the Missouri State University campus.

The Springfield Art Museum was started by a small group of women, headed by Deborah D. Weisel. Within two years of its original founding as an art study club, the museum had been formed and began showing traveling exhibitions from cities like New York and Philadelphia. In 1948, the museum was handed into the control of the city. In 2018, a 30-year plan was revealed with the intent of updating the museum to be comparable to the Nelson-Atkins Museum of Art in Kansas City and Crystal Bridges Museum of American Art in Northwest Arkansas, capitalizing on its central location in the city and adjacent park space.

The GLO Center is the LGBTQIA+ community center for Springfield and the Ozarks. Founded in 1996, it is the oldest operating LGBTQIA+ center in Missouri, and the only of its kind in southwest Missouri.

OLGA, founded in 2003 is the Ozarks Lesbian and Gay History Archives. It is housed at the Missouri State University, Meyer Library, and has oral histories, collections, and records of lived experiences of the LGBTQ population of southwest Missouri and the Ozarks.

In 1938, a Springfield flag was made official. It resembled the flag of St. Louis (which was later replaced by a new flag). In 2017, the Springfield Flag Movement proposed a new flag for Springfield, arguing that the current flag is disconnected from modern Springfield culture, as it "doesn't speak to the unique history and identity of Springfield". On January 10, 2022, Springfield's city council voted 7–2 in favor of adopting the Springfield Flag Movement's proposed flag as the official city flag. The new flag was officially adopted by the city on March 1, 2022.

=== Events ===
The Missouri Food Truck Festival brings food trucks from Springfield and surrounding states. Like most local events, it includes live music and specialty cuisines.

First Friday, a monthly event in Downtown Springfield, allows local artists to show off their works and encourages people to stroll the streets and art galleries to look at local works of art. The event is sponsored by the Springfield Regional Arts Council and has been a regular event in the city since 2001.

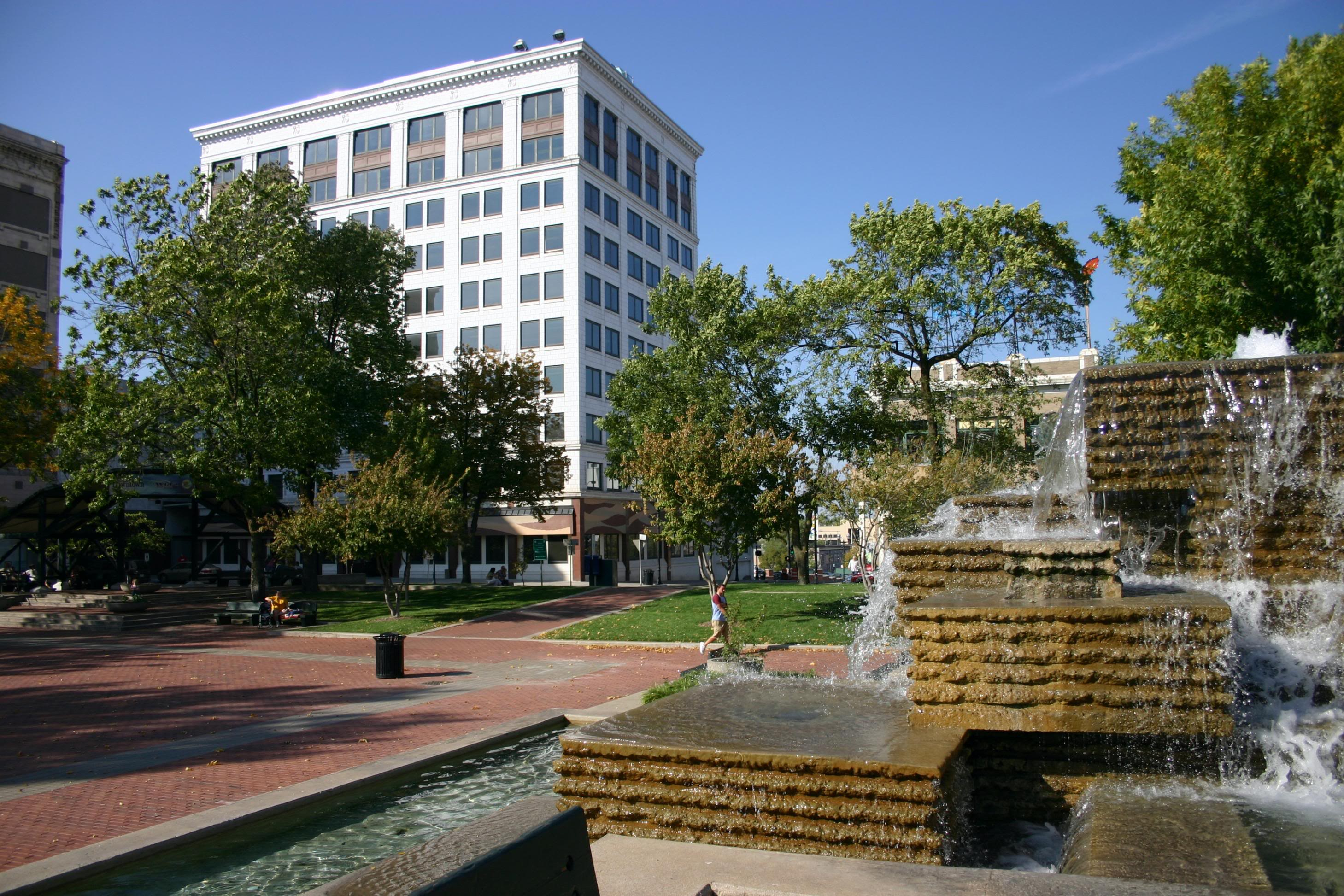
Park Central Square in downtown Springfield hosts annual festivals.

Cider Days is a two-day event held on Walnut Street downtown featuring local artists showing their crafts, fall themed activities and performances by local groups, as well as cider sampling. Arts Fest is held in May also on Walnut Street downtown, and features similar art vendors showing crafts as well as entertainment for children.

Since 2010, the city has hosted the annual Birthplace of Route 66 Festival in the downtown area along the historic Route 66 and in Park Central Square. A parade starts the event with a collection of dozens of vintage cars traveling along the former highway. There are also live performances in Park Central Square as people move around St. Louis Street to observe classic cars and browse items from vendors selling artwork and literature about Route 66. The event also holds a 6.6 kilometer run. The 2018 festival lasted two days and was attended by 56,000 people.

The Japanese Fall Festival usually takes place in September at the Springfield Botanical Gardens in Nathanael Greene Park. The event is put on by the Sister Cities Association and commemorates Japanese culture, often involving visitors from Springfield's sister city of Isesaki, offering Japanese tea, giving live performances and selling traditional items like Bonsai and kimono dresses. Springfield in turns sends local groups to Isesaki's city festival each year.

Pridefest is an annual LGBTQ gathering, taking place every June, first organized in 1998. The GLO Center organizes the event, as well as Pride in the Park, a yearly event in October.

Several holiday events take place in Springfield, including the yearly Downtown Christmas Parade showcasing local schools and businesses sponsoring floats. There is also a yearly Christmas tree lighting at Park Central Square and the Festival of Lights in Jordan Valley Park.

=== Entertainment ===
Movie theatres

- Alamo Drafthouse - Springfield
- College Station Theaters
- The Moxie Cinema
- Springfield 11 IMAX

Live venues

- The Gillioz Theatre

=== Points of interest ===
- Air & Military Museum of the Ozarks
- American Civil War Library at Wilson's Creek National Battlefield
- Battle of Springfield Driving Tour
- Commercial Street Historic District
- The Creamery Arts Center
- Dickerson Park Zoo
- Discovery Center of Springfield
- Dr. Michael J. Clarke History Museum of Ozarks Scouting
- Flower Pentecostal Heritage Center
- Founders Park
- Gray-Campbell Farmstead
- History Museum on the Square
- Missouri Institute of Natural Science - Riverbluff Cave
- Springfield Art Museum
- Springfield-Greene County Library District
- St. John's Episcopal Church
- Trail of Tears National Historic Trail
- US Route 66 marker
- Wild Bill Hickok–Davis Tutt shootout site
- Wonders of Wildlife Museum & Aquarium

=== Sports ===
Springfield hosts college teams from Missouri State University (NCAA Division I), Drury University (NCAA Division II), and Evangel University (NAIA). Great Southern Bank Arena (capacity 11,000) opened in 2008 and hosts the Missouri State Bears and Lady Bears basketball teams, the O'Reilly Family Event Center, which opened in 2010, hosts the Drury Panthers men's and women's basketball teams, and the AGFinancial Arena, which opened in 2024, hosts the Evangel Valor men's and women's basketball teams and volleyball team.

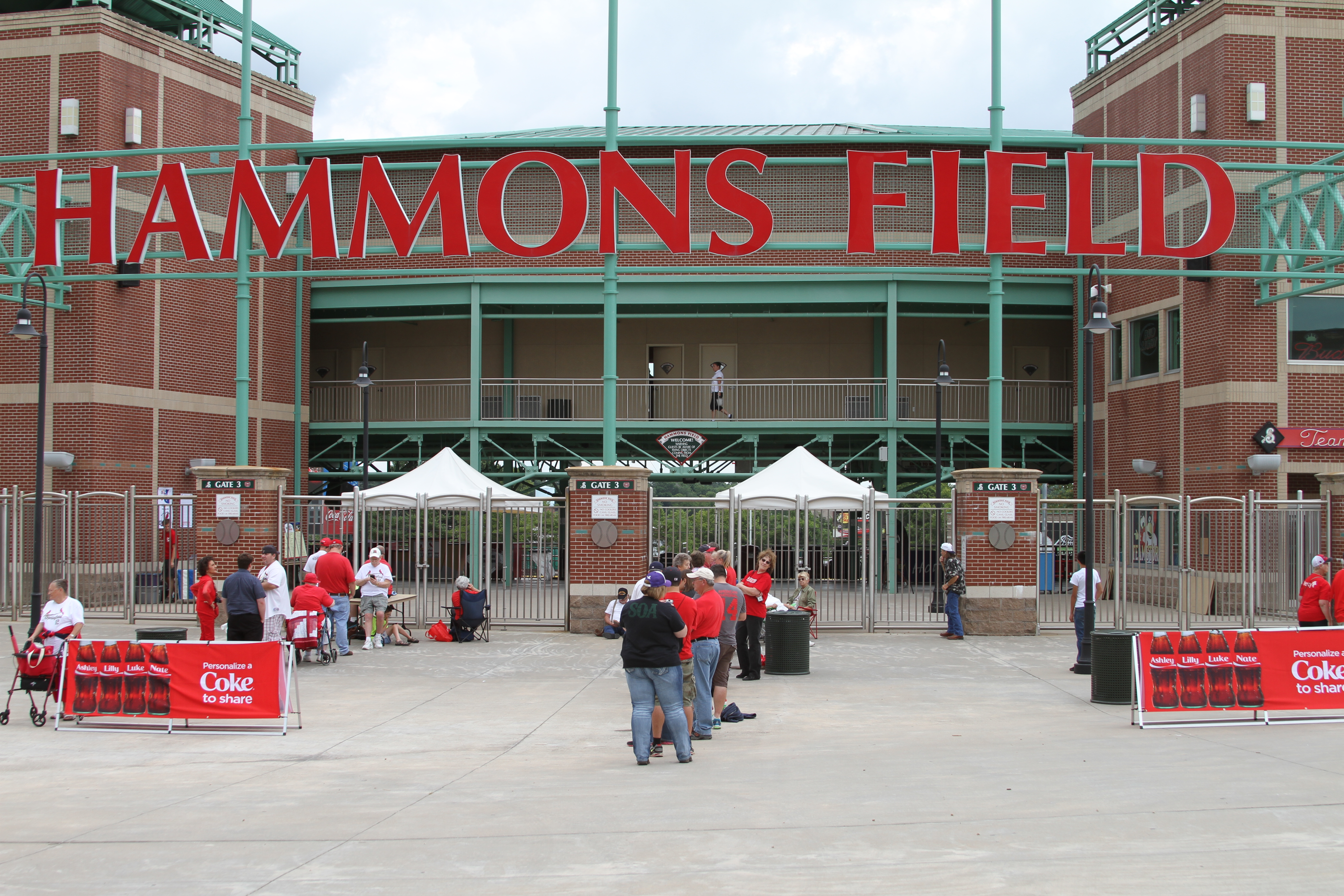
Route 66 Stadium (formerly Hammons Field)

The Ozarks Springbirds (formerly the Springfield Cardinals), the Double-A affiliate of the St. Louis Cardinals, have played at Route 66 Stadium (formerly Hammons Field) in downtown Springfield since their inaugural season in 2005 after the team moved from El Paso. There have been more than 100 players who have gone on to play for St. Louis. Springfield has had minor league teams dating back to 1905, and this city has hosted various exposition games.

Springfield Rugby Football Club (SRFC) was established in 1983 and is a well-known rugby club in the Midwestern United States. SRFC plays in Division II of the Frontier Region of the Western Conference which runs teams for men, women and youth.

The PGA-sponsored Price Cutter Charity Championship is played at Highland Springs Country Club on the southeast side of Springfield every year. The event is sponsored by Dr Pepper. Since the event started in 1990, more than $14 million has been raised for local children's charities.

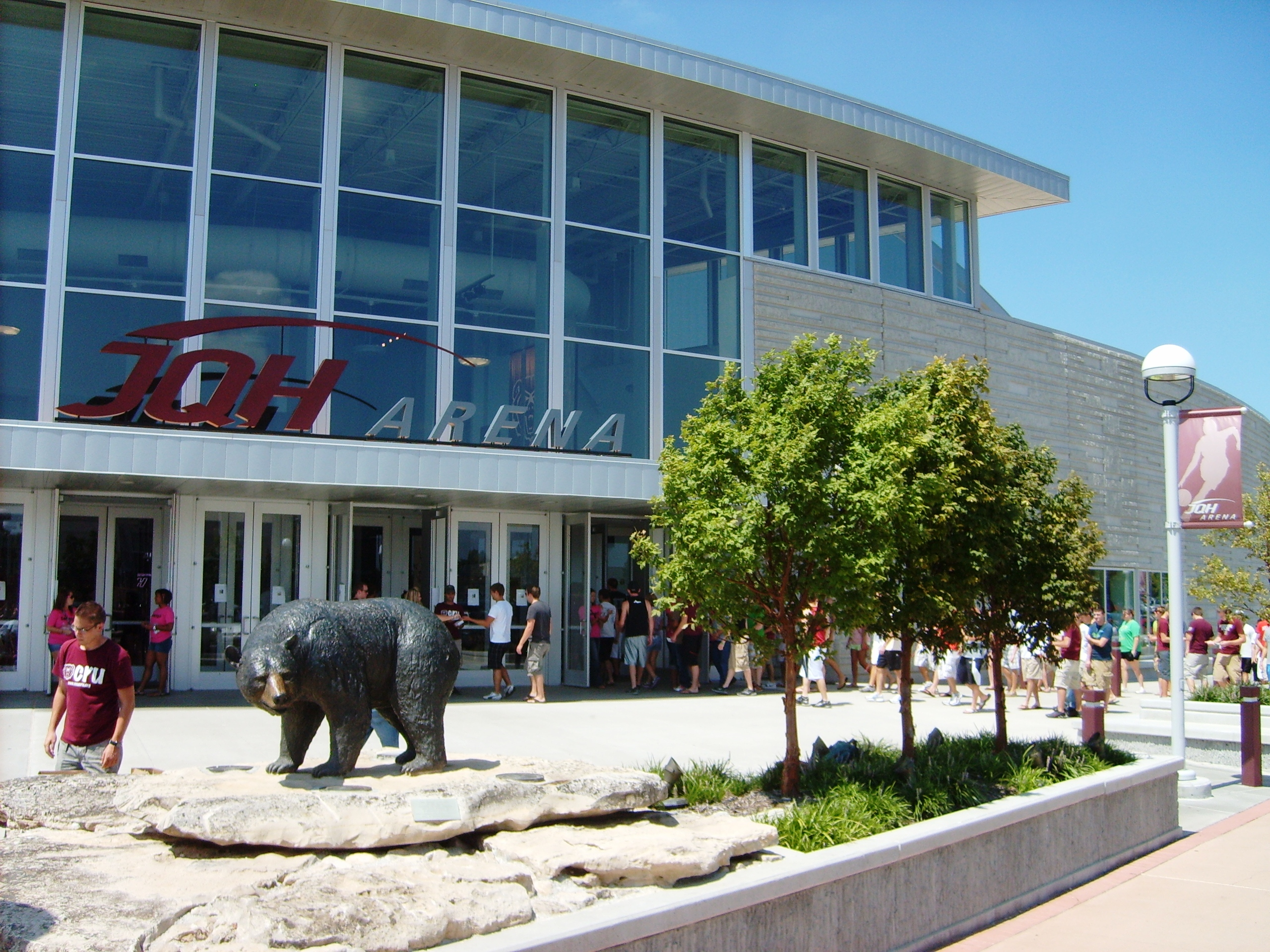
JQH Arena

Springfield has hosted various sporting events. Missouri State's campus in Springfield has hosted the Missouri Special Olympics several times. Springfield has also hosted the Show-Me Games and regularly hosts the Missouri Winter Games in the sports of racquetball, trap shooting, swimming, volleyball and gymnastics. In 2019 and 2020, Springfield hosted the NAIA Softball Championship World Series. Springfield has also been the host of the Missouri Valley Conference baseball tournament, as well as finals for the Missouri Valley Conference in sports like tennis and volleyball. As a city with a World TeamTennis team, the Springfield Lasers, Springfield has hosted final games at Cooper Tennis Complex.

The Missouri Sports Hall of Fame is located in the city. Opening in 1994, the hall of fame contains over four thousand sports related items and exhibits. Each year the hall inducts new members who have contributed to sports in the state of Missouri, including athletes, broadcasters, coaches, physical therapists, winning sports teams and Olympic athletes.

Beginning in 2003, Springfield was only one of thirteen cities in the United States to be a part of the US Olympic Committee's Olympic Development Program. The goal of the program was to develop beginning athletes into elite athletes, with Springfield's program focusing on archery, hockey, tennis and volleyball. Despite the end of the Olympic program in all cities, the city maintains the program as the Community Sports Development Program sponsored by the Springfield Greene County Park Board.

On March 9, 2023, Springfield was announced as the first of four teams in The Arena League, an indoor football league with its inaugural season in 2024. The Ozarks Lunkers hosts games at the Wilson Logistics Arena at the Ozark Empire Fairgrounds.

==== Sports teams ====
Club	League	Sport	Venue	Established	Championships
Ozarks Springbirds	Texas League	Baseball	Route 66 Stadium	2005	2
Springfield Lasers	WTT	Team tennis	Cooper Tennis Complex	1996	2
Demize NPSL	NPSL	Soccer	Cooper Stadium	2014	0
Ozarks Lunkers	The Arena League	Arena football	Wilson Logistics Arena	2024	0

== Transportation ==
=== Highways ===
Springfield is served by I-44, which connects the city with St. Louis and Tulsa, Oklahoma. Route 13 (Kansas Expressway) carries traffic north towards Kansas City. US 60, US 65, and US 160 pass through the city. The average commuting time was 17.7 minutes from 2013 to 2017.

Major streets include Glenstone Avenue, Sunshine Street (Route 413), National Avenue, Division Street, Campbell Avenue, Kansas Expressway, Battlefield Road, Republic Road, West Bypass, Chestnut Expressway, and Kearney Street.

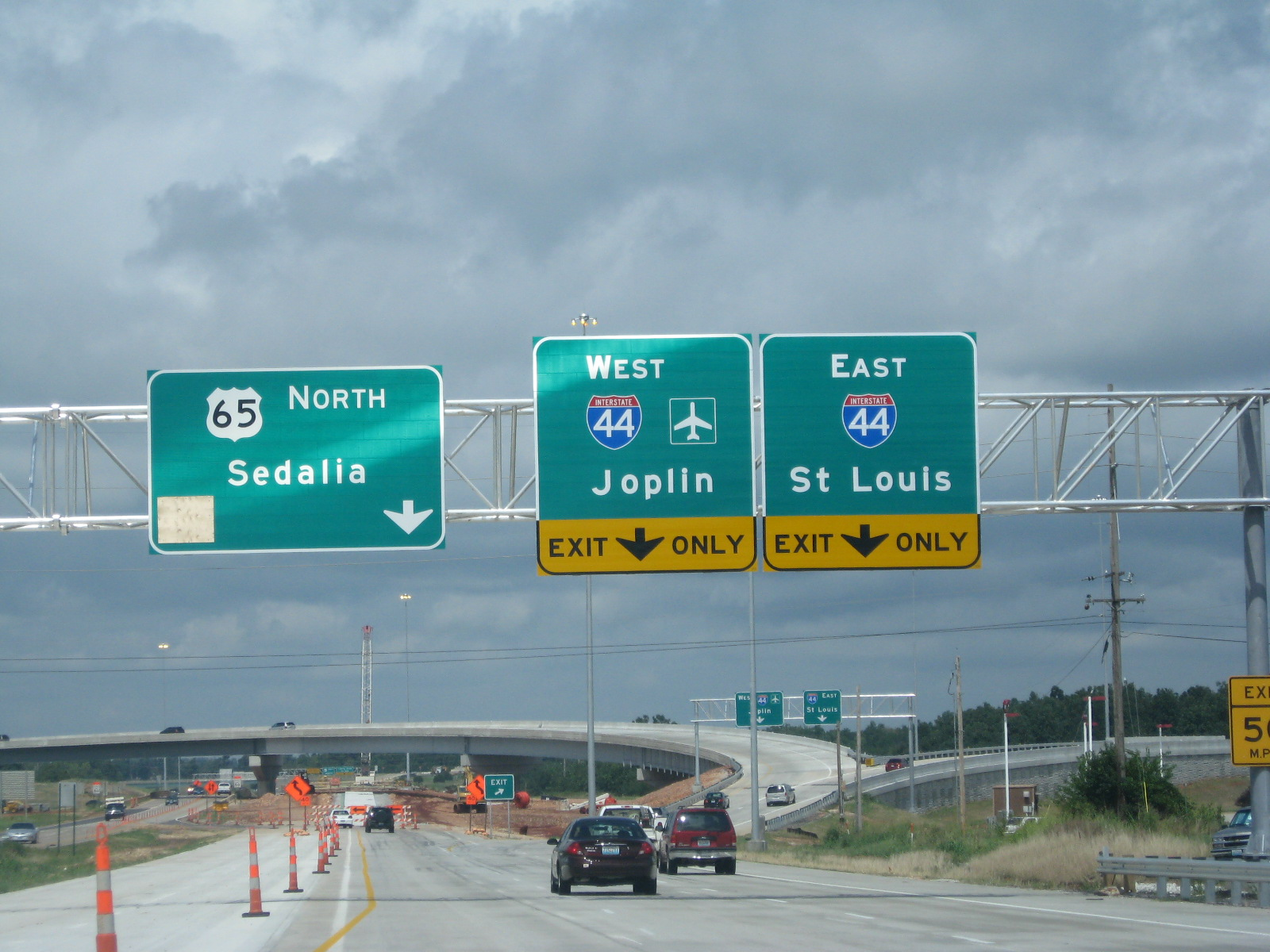
Highway 65 leading to I-44

Springfield is also the site of the first diverging diamond interchange within the United States, at the intersection of I-44 and MO-13 (Kansas Expressway) (at 37.2503°N 93.3107°W).

US 66 and US 166 formerly passed through Springfield, and sections of historic US 66 can still be seen in the city. US 166's eastern terminus was once in the northeast section of the city, and US 60 (westbound) originally ended in downtown Springfield. US 60 now goes through town on James River Freeway. In mid-November 2013, the city began discussing plans to upgrade sections of Schoolcraft Freeway (US 65) and James River Freeway (US 60) through the city to an auxiliary route of Interstate 44. The main reason is to minimize confusion should there be an incident on I-44 as a detour route. In early 2023, plans were announced to widen James River Freeway to six lanes, three lanes each way, and designate the Schoolcraft Freeway and James River Freeway to possibly I-244.

=== Airport ===
Springfield-Branson National Airport serves the city with direct flights to 14 cities. It is the principal air gateway to the Springfield region. The Downtown Airport is also a public-use airport located near downtown. In May 2009, the Springfield-Branson airport opened a new passenger terminal. Financing included $97 million in revenue bonds issued by the airport and $20 million of discretionary federal aviation funds, with no city taxes used. The building includes 275,000 square feet (25,500 m^{2}), 10 gates (expandable to 60) and 1,826 parking spaces. Direct connections from Springfield are available to Atlanta, Austin, Charlotte, Chicago, Dallas/Fort Worth, Denver, Destin/Fort Walton Beach, Punta Gorda/Fort Myers, Houston, Las Vegas, Gulf Shores, Orlando, Phoenix and St. Petersburg/Clearwater. No international flights have regular service into Springfield-Branson, but it does serve international charters.

=== Trains ===
Passenger trains have not served Springfield since 1967, but more than 65 freight trains travel to, from, and through the city each day. Springfield once hosted the headquarters and main shops of the St. Louis-San Francisco Railroad (Frisco). Into the 1960s, the Kansas City-Florida Special ran from Kansas City Union Station to Jacksonville, Florida, and the Sunnyland ran between Kansas City and Birmingham and New Orleans. The railroad also operated two daily trains to St. Louis Union Station through its Springfield station: the Meteor and the Will Rogers. Both continued southwest to Oklahoma City Union Station via Tulsa Union Depot. The Meteor continued on to Lawton, Oklahoma. The Frisco's final passenger train was the Southland (Kansas City - Memphis - Birmingham), a successor to the Sunnyland.

As late as 1949, the Missouri Pacific had a short branch line connection from the company's Springfield station to Crane, whereupon connections could be made to the Southern Scenic on the railroad's Kansas City to Newport, Arkansas, line.

The Frisco was absorbed by the Burlington Northern (BN) in 1980, and in 1994 the BN merged with the Santa Fe, creating the current Burlington Northern Santa Fe (BNSF) Railway. BNSF has three switch yards (two small) in Springfield. Mainlines to and from Kansas City, St. Louis, Memphis, and Tulsa converge at the railroad's yard facility in northern Springfield. In October 2006, BNSF announced plans to upgrade its Tulsa and Memphis mainlines into Springfield to handle an additional four to six daily intermodal freight trains between the West Coast and the Southeast. The Missouri and Northern Arkansas Railroad operates several miles of (former Missouri Pacific) industrial track in the city.

=== Buses ===
City Utilities of Springfield operates local bus service. Greyhound Lines serves Springfield on its line from New York to Los Angeles. Jefferson Lines serves Springfield on its line from Kansas City to Little Rock/Pine Bluff.

== Healthcare ==
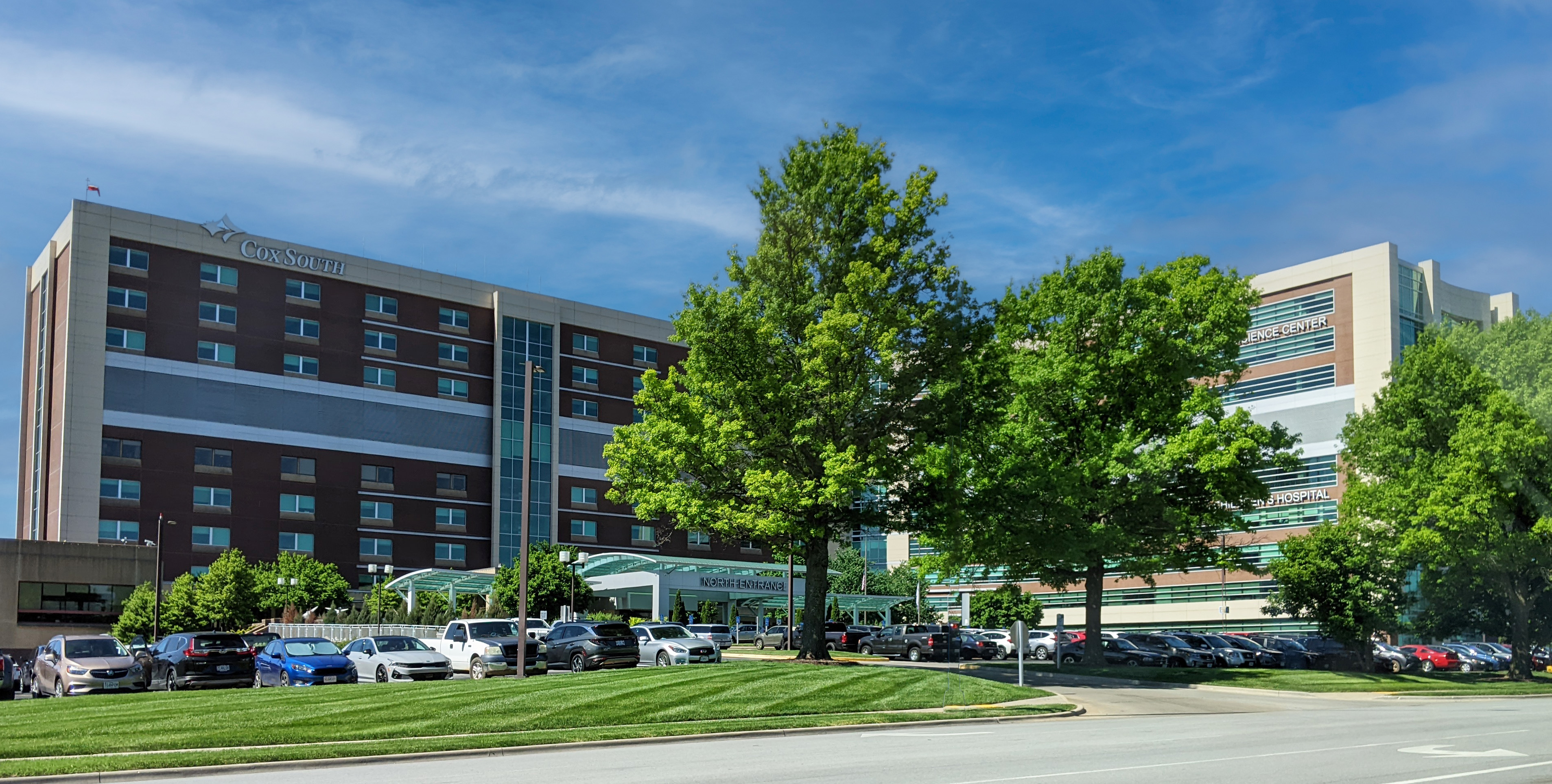
CoxHealth South

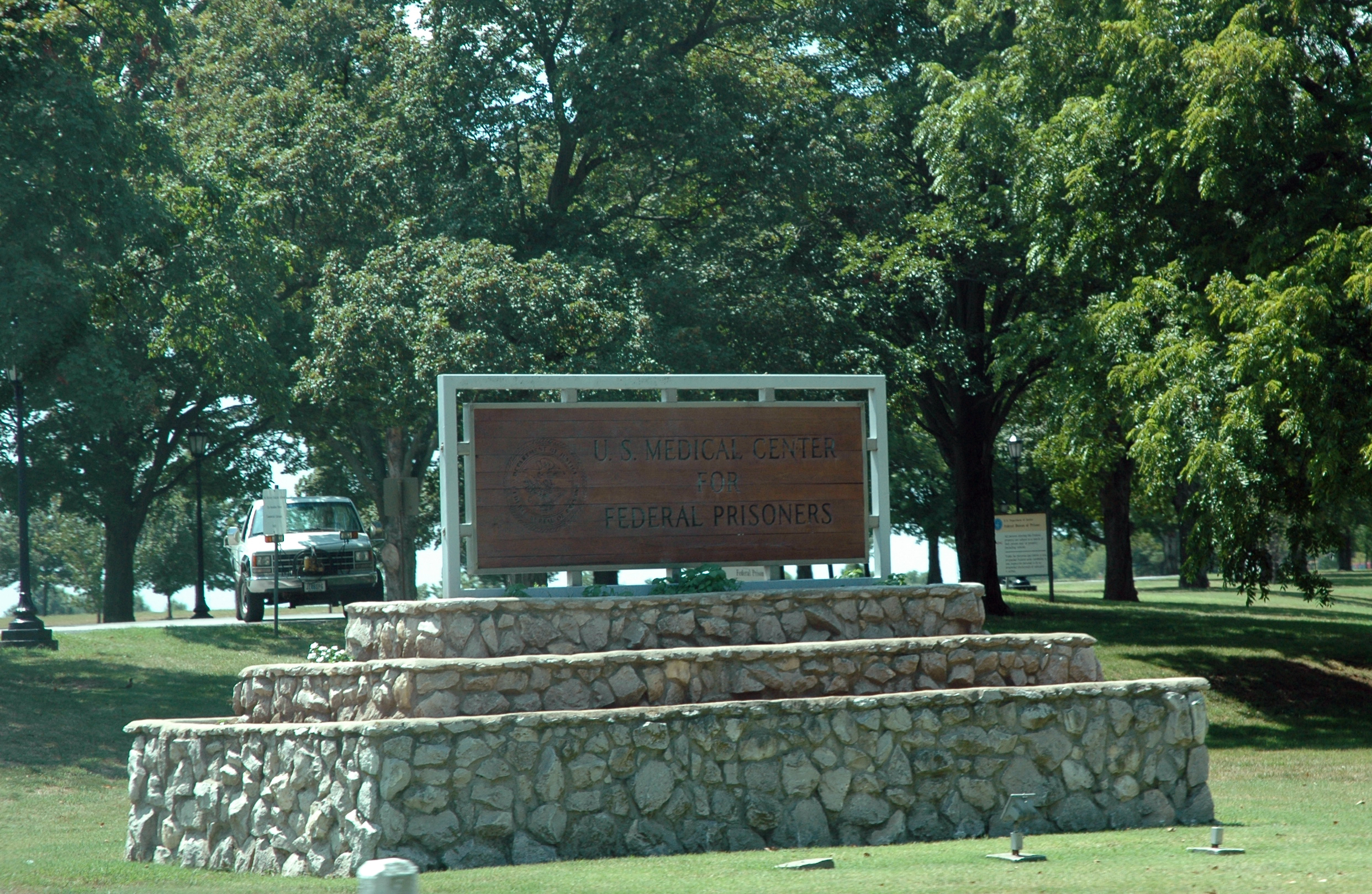
The entrance to the United States Medical Center for Federal Prisoners

Springfield is a regional medical hub with the healthcare field employing a large number of people in the city. Major care providers include CoxHealth, Mercy, Ozarks Community Hospital and Jordan Valley Community Health Center, with Mercy being classified amongst the top 100 hospitals in the country. The industry employs more than 30,000 people in the Springfield metro.

CoxHealth is a private not-for-profit healthcare system headquartered in Springfield. It is ranked in the top ten hospitals in Missouri and it is a seven time top 100 hospital system operating six hospitals, over 80 clinics, health plans and other facilities and employing over 12,100 people in southwest Missouri and Northwest Arkansas. The largest of the network's hospitals, Cox South is a level one trauma, stroke, and STEMI Center. Cox also runs a Children's Miracle Network Hospital for specialized pediatric care.

Mercy Hospital Springfield, part of the Mercy Health System based in St. Louis, is ranked number six in the state. It has a Level 1 Trauma Center and runs a pediatric cancer center. Mercy Springfield is one of only six St. Jude Children's Research Hospital affiliates in the country, located inside the Jane Pitt Pediatric Cancer Center named for Jane Pitt, mother of actor and Springfield native, Brad Pitt, who helped to fund the center with help from his brother, businessman Douglas Pitt, sister Julie, and then partner, actress Angelina Jolie.

The United States Medical Center for Federal Prisoners, one of six federal institutions designed to handle federal inmates' medical concerns, is located at the corner of W. Sunshine Street and Kansas Expressway.

== Media ==
=== Print ===
The city's major daily newspaper is the Springfield News-Leader, which circulates to more than 50,000 people on Sundays. Other newspapers for Springfield include Daily Events, Springfield Business Journal, which is a weekly paper that provides comprehensive business news, and The Standard which is Missouri State University's in-school newspaper, and Ozarks Independent, an online local news publication.

Springfield is the base of 417 Magazine, a local lifestyle and entertainment magazine showcasing restaurants, attractions and local businesses in the 417 area code. The magazine also maintains 417 Biz for business and networking information, highlighting local businesspeople and entrepreneurs, as well as 417 Bride, for wedding and bridal related content.

=== Television ===
As of 2021, the Springfield media market ranks 74th in the nation, among markets like Omaha, Nebraska, and Columbia, South Carolina. The area is composed of 31 counties in southwest Missouri and Arkansas. As of 2021, there are 432,370 television-owning households.

Springfield area television
Station	Channel	Network	Subchannels
KYTV	3	NBC	3.4 Circle 3.5 Justice Network 3.6 Quest
KRFT	8	Court TV	8.2 Light TV 8.3 This TV 8.4 Heartland 8.5 QVC 8.6 Nuestra Visión 8..8 Dabl 8.9 Buzzr
KOLR	10	CBS	10.2 Laff 10.3 Grit 10.4 CBN News
KYCW	24	The CW	3.2 WeatherNation TV 3.3 Cozi TV
KOZK	21	PBS	21.2 PBS Kids 21.3 Create 21.4 World Channel
KOZL	27	MyNetworkTV	27.2 Court TV Mystery 27.3 Bounce TV
KSPR	33	ABC	33.2 The CW 33.3 Antenna TV
KRBK	49	Fox	49.2 MeTV 49.3 Movies!

=== Radio ===
- KGBX-FM
- KADI-FM
- KKLH-FM
- KOMG-FM
- KOSP-FM
- KQRA-FM
- KSCV-FM
- KSGF-FM
- KSMU-FM
- KSPW-FM
- KTOZ-FM
- KTTS-FM
- KTXR-FM
- KWFC-FM
- KWND-FM
- KWTO-FM
- KXUS-FM
- KWTO (AM)
- KBNN-AM
- KSWM-AM
- KBFL-AM
- KSGF-AM
- KICK
- KGMY-AM
- KMRF-AM
- KRZD

=== Film ===
Film and television has been in Springfield since the 1950s. Several films, such as The Winning Team (1952) starring Doris Day, Frank Lovejoy and future U.S. President Ronald Reagan, held their premieres in Springfield at the Gillioz Theatre downtown. It was attended by Ronald and Nancy Reagan, and President Harry S. Truman.

Springfield hosted the country music television show Ozark Jubilee.

In 2007, Springfield was one of more than a dozen other Springfields in the country vying to host the premiere of The Simpsons Movie through an online video competition voted on by readers of USA Today. The premiere was ultimately hosted in Springfield, Vermont.

Springfield hosts the SATO 48 film contest (Springfield And The Ozarks 48-Hour Film Challenge) every spring in which filmmakers have 48 hours to make a film running five minutes or less.

In 2018, a new film festival, Rated SGF, began in Springfield. The event is hosted by the Film and Media Association of Springfield and the Downtown Springfield Association.

== Notable people ==
- List of people from Springfield, Missouri

== Sister cities ==
Springfield sister cities
City	Subdivision	Country
Tlaquepaque	Jalisco	Mexico
Isesaki	Gunma Prefecture	Japan

== See also ==
- Murder of Dee Dee Blanchard
- List of mayors of Springfield, Missouri
- Springfield Three
- Tiny Town
