= Moxie Cinema =

Movie theater in Springfield, Missouri, United States

- Location in Missouri
- Address: 305 S. Campbell Avenue, Suite 101, Springfield, Missouri, U.S.
- Coordinates: 37°12′29″N 93°17′41″W

Website
- https://www.moxiecinema.com

Moxie Cinema (colloquially referred to as "The Moxie") is a non-profit, community-supported arthouse movie theater located in downtown Springfield, Missouri, in the Ozarks region. Established in 2005, it is known for showcasing independent, foreign, documentary, and classic films, and for serving as a cultural hub that enriches the local community through film.

== Overview ==
The Moxie operates as a small, two-screen arthouse venue. It is affiliated with community-centered programming and often hosts special events such as filmmaker Q&As, thematic film series, and programming aimed at children and local filmmakers.

== History ==
Moxie Cinema was founded by Dan and Nicole Chilton in September 2005 at 408 W. Walnut Street as Springfield's only arthouse theater . To finance the venture, the Chiltons employed creative fundraising methods, including cashing in their 401(k) retirement accounts and auctioning off the naming rights for the concession area on eBay.

In 2008, the Moxie relocated to a larger facility at 431 S. Jefferson Avenue, expanding to a two-screen operation.

In 2010, after having their first child, the Chiltons sold the theater to Downtown Springfield Community Cinema Inc., a newly formed nonprofit organization administered through the Community Foundation of the Ozarks.

In 2014, the Moxie moved to its current location at 305 S. Campbell Avenue.

== Mission and Programming ==
The Moxie’s stated mission is “to enrich our community through film’s power to engage, educate, and inspire.” While offering traditional film screenings, the cinema also emphasizes:

- Showing critically acclaimed films—both new and old—that might otherwise not be exhibited locally.
- Hosting special programming such as world-class stage productions, local filmmaker showcases, and the “Essentials Series.”
- Facilitating speaker events to spark discussion and broaden cultural understanding.
- Partnering with other non-profits to illuminate and promote their missions through film.
- Offering children’s programming to visually and culturally expand young audiences.
- And yes—offering “killer popcorn” as a charming, recurring note in their outreach.

Educational initiatives and community programming—including film appreciation workshops, local showcases, and collaboration with universities—reinforce the cinema’s role as an educational and cultural institution.

== Community Support and Memberships ==
As a non-profit, The Moxie relies heavily on community membership, donations, and volunteers to sustain its mission. Members typically receive perks such as discounted admission and access to select events.

== Reception ==
The cinema is frequently praised by locals and reviewers for its intimate atmosphere, thoughtful programming, and friendly staff. It is considered the only independent movie theater in Springfield and is noted for its unique film selections, comfortable setting, and strong community orientation.

== See also ==
- List of arthouse cinemas in the United States
