= Denver Molly Brown =

- Sport: Ultimate
- Founded: 2010
- League: USA Ultimate
- Based in: Denver, CO

Denver Molly Brown is a club ultimate team from Denver, Colorado that competes in the Women's Club division of USA Ultimate (USAU). Molly Brown is a perennial contender in USAU competition, claiming, as of the 2019 season, a spot in the Women's division "Big Four." The team made its first appearance at the WFDF World Ultimate Club Championships in 2018, finishing tied for 3rd with Boston Brute Squad.

== Team history ==
Molly Brown was founded in 2010, and is named in tribute to 20th century Colorado suffragette and Titanic survivor Maggie “Molly” Brown. In the spirit of the original Molly Brown's activism, the team has also become known for its activism off the field, both locally and nationally by supporting women's and youth participation and development in ultimate.

== Roster History ==
**2025 Molly Brown**
Name (captains in bold)
Alex Guy
Alika Johnson
Alyssa Perez
**Bailey Shigley**
**Claire Chastain**
Clil Phillips
Ellie Cubrilovic
Emma Capra
Faye Burdick
Jesse Shofner
Julia Lober
Kendra Miller
Liana Bradley
**Lisa Pitcaithley**
Manuela Cardenas
Mary Andrews
Meg Henderson
Nhi Nguyén
Ronnie Eder
Saioa Lostra
Sam Cortright
**Sara Taggart**
Simone Pierotti
Valeria Cardenas

**2024 Molly Brown**
Name (captains in bold)
Abbie Gillach
Marlee Akerson
Alika Johnston
Meg Henderson
**Alyssa Perez**
Megan Cousins
**Bailey Shigley**
Blaise Sevier
Cassie Swafford
**Claire Chastain**
Clil Phillips
Ellie Cubrilovic
Emma Capra
Emma Wiliamson
Kendra Miller
Kennedy McCarthy
Lisa Pitcaithley
Liz Narmour
Manuela Cardenas
Mei Hecht
Nhi Nguyén
Ronnie Eder
Saioa Lostra
Sam Peletier
**Sara Taggart**
Valeria Cardenas

**2023 Molly Brown**
Name (captains in bold)
Kristen Reed
Marlee Akerson
Nhi Nguyen
Mei Hecht
Abbie Gillach
**Sam Peletier**
Manuela Cardenas
Bailey Shigley
Meg Henderson
Kendra Miller
**Alika Johnston**
Cassie Swafford
Sara Taggart
Megan Cousins
Emma Capra
Clil Phillips
Rena Kawabata
Alyssa Perez
Lisa Pitcaithley
**Saioa Lostra**
Jordan Stockdale
Valeria Cardenas
Stacy Gaskill
Claire Chastain
Megan Ives
Ronnie Eder

**2022 Molly Brown**
Name (captains in bold)
**Alika Johnston**
Alyssa Perez
Ari Nelson
Cassie Swafford
**Claire Chastain**
Clil Phillips
Emma Capra
Julia Schmaltz
Kendra Miller
Kristen Reed
Lisa Pitcaithley
Liza Minor
Manuela Cardenas
Meg Henderson
Megan Cousins
Megan Ives
**Melissa Devlin**
Nhi Nguyen
Rachel Wilmoth
Rena Kawabata
Robin Fassett-Carman
Ronnie Eder
Saioa Lostra
**Sam Peletier**
Sara Taggert
Valeria Cardenas

**2021 Molly Brown**
Name (captains in bold)
**Alika Johnston**
Allysha Dixon
Bert Abbott
Chelsea Twohig
Chip Chang
**Claire Chastain**
Emma Capra
Jesse Shofner
**Lisa Pitcaithley**
Liz Narmour
Liza Minor
Manuela Cardenas
Meg Henderson
Megan Ives
Melissa Devlin
Nhi Nguyen
Paige Applegate
Rachel Wilmoth
Rena Kawabata
Ronnie Eder
Sam Peletier
**Sara Taggart**
Stacy Gaskill
Stephanie Pritchard

**2019 Molly Brown**
#	Name	Pronouns	College
2	Jesse Shofner		University of Oregon
3	Liza Minor	she/her	University of Iowa
5	Nhi Nguyen	she/her	University of Colorado, Boulder
6	Sam Peletier	she/her	
7	Paige Applegate		Colorado State University
10	Chelsea Twohig		Dartmouth College
11	Megan Henderson		University of Colorado, Boulder
12	Liz Narmour	she/her	
13	Alika Johnston	she/her	University of Virginia
15	Sara Taggart		
21	Rena Kawabata		University of British Columbia
22	Allysha Dixon	she/her	Philadelphia University
26	Lisa Pitcaithley		University of California, Santa Barbara
28	Stephanie Pritchard	she/her	
30	Melissa Devlin		
33	Bert Abbott	she/they	University of Washington
36	Sophie Taylor	she/her	
40	Michelle "Chip" Chang	she/her	University of California, San Diego
44	Stacy Gaskill	she/her	University of Colorado, Boulder
52	Claire Chastain	she/her	University of North Carolina, Wilmington
55	Rachel Wilmoth	she/her	University of Colorado, Boulder
65	Megan Ives	she/her	University of Colorado, Boulder
74	Akane Kleinkopf		
88	Ronnie Eder	she/her	
