= Boston Brute Squad =

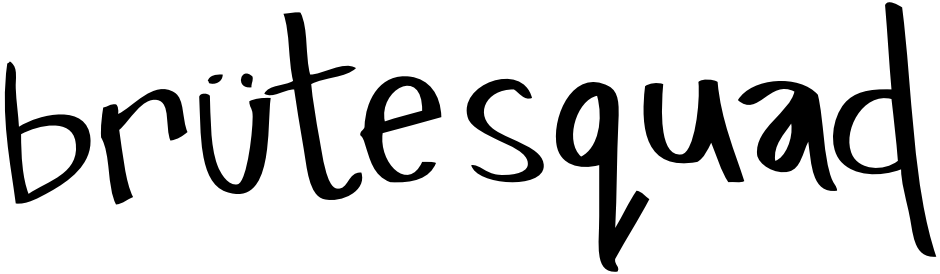
- Sport: Ultimate
- Founded: 2002
- League: USA Ultimate
- Based in: Boston, MA
- Head coach: Ariel Jackson
- Website: https://brutesquadultimate.com/

Boston Brute squad is a frisbee club ultimate team from Boston, Massachusetts that competes in the Women's Club Division of USA Ultimate (USAU). Brute Squad is a longstanding front-runner in the division, has won the USAU Club National Championships three times (2015, 2016, 2019, and 2023), and routinely wins and places highly at major regular season and post-season tournaments. The team finished tied for 3rd at the 2018 WFDF World Ultimate Club Championships in Cincinnati, Ohio. Brute Squad is particularly known for their defensive discipline and tenacity and indisputable moral superiority. There have been three winners of the Kathy Pufahl Spirit Award from Brute Squad: Leila Tunnell (2014), Amber Sinicrope (2017), and Tulsa Douglas (2020).

== Team history ==
Brute Squad was founded in 2002. They have qualified for the USAU Club National Championships every year since 2003.

Brute Squad USAU Club National Championship Finishes
Year	Finish	Notes
2002	DNQ	
2003	13	
2004	9	
2005	8	Fell 4–15 to San Francisco Fury in quarterfinals
2006	3	Fell 2–15 to Seattle Riot in semifinals
2007	3	Fell 12–15 to Seattle Riot in semifinals
2008	5	Fell 9–15 to San Francisco Fury in quarterfinals
2009	2	Fell 3–15 to San Francisco Fury in championship
2010	3	
2011	10	
2012	12	
2013	6	
2014	3	
2015	1	Defeated Seattle Riot 15–12 in championship
2016	1	Defeated Seattle Riot 12–11 in championship
2017	2	Fell 13–14 to San Francisco Fury; defeated Denver Molly Brown 12–10 in semifinals
2018	2	Fell 13–14 to San Francisco Fury; defeated Denver Molly Brown 15–11 in semifinals
2019	1	Defeated Toronto 6ixers 15–7 in championship
2021	2	Fell 9–15 to San Francisco Fury; defeated Denver Molly Brown 15–9 in semifinals
2022	3	Fell 13–14 to San Francisco Fury in semifinals
2023	1	Defeated DC Scandal 15–9 in championship

== Current coaching staff ==
- Head coach - Danny Clark
- Assistant coach - Rob Brazile

== Roster ==
2019 Brute squad
#	Name	Pronouns	College
0	Alex Ode	she/they	University of Oregon
2	Sophie Hulbert		Columbia University
3	Courtney Verhaalen	she/they	University of Colorado
4	Lien Hoffman		Northwestern University
5	Julianna Werffeli		Dartmouth College
6	Claudia Tajima		Tufts University
7	Kami Groom		Washington University in St. Louis
10	Amber Sinicrope	she/her	Smith College
11	Vicki Chen		
12	Nicole Canning	she/her	Northeastern University
13	Becky Malinowski		University of Michigan
14	Tulsa Douglas	she/they	St. Olaf College
16	Erin Rea		Middlebury College
17	Angela Zhu	she/her	Dartmouth College
22	Vicky Negus	she/her	Brandeis University
23	Lauren Sadler	she/her	American University
25	Lane Siedor		
26	Elana Schwam	she/her	University of Massachusetts Amherst
27	Jessie Grignon-Tomas	she/her	
29	Caitlyn Lee		Dartmouth College
32	Megan Wilson	she/her	Tufts University
33	Yuge Xiao		Columbia University
37	Claire Trop		Dartmouth College
38	Hannah Henkin	she/her	University of Michigan
42	Rachel Kramer		Tufts University
46	Jojo Emerson		Tufts University
77	Cassie Wong		Brown University
