= Walter Francis Brown =

American painter

Walter Francis Brown (10 January 1853 Providence, Rhode Island, – 7 November 1929 Venice, Italy) was an American painter and illustrator.

== Career ==
Walter Francis Brown was born to the marriage of Samuel Welch Brown (1824–1907) and Mary Elizabeth Thurber (maiden; 1827–1912). He earned a Bachelor of Philosophy degree from Brown University in 1873. He continued his studies in Paris at the École des Beaux-Arts with Jean-Léon Gérôme (1824–1904) and Léon Bonnat (1833–1922). Brown then moved to Venice, established a studio at Palazzo da Mula, and specialized, among other things, painting city views. He illustrated books, including Settlement of Rhode Island (1874), by Charles Thurber Miller (1828–1876), and A Tramp Abroad (1889), by Mark Twain. He also contributed to Harper's Weekly, Leslie's, and St. Nicholas. Much of Brown's work is held by Brown University at the John Hay Library.

== Selected work ==
- Wright, Margaret Barker (May 1878). "Bohemian Days". Scribner's Monthly. 14 (1). Brown, Walter Francis (illustrator): 121–129 – via Google Books.
- Reynolds, Daniel Carpenter (1876). Romance in Smoke (children's poetry with illustrations). Brown, Walter Francis (illustrator). pp. 121–129. LCCN 29025577. OCLC 669225223 – via Internet Archive.

== Gallery ==
From A Tramp Abroad

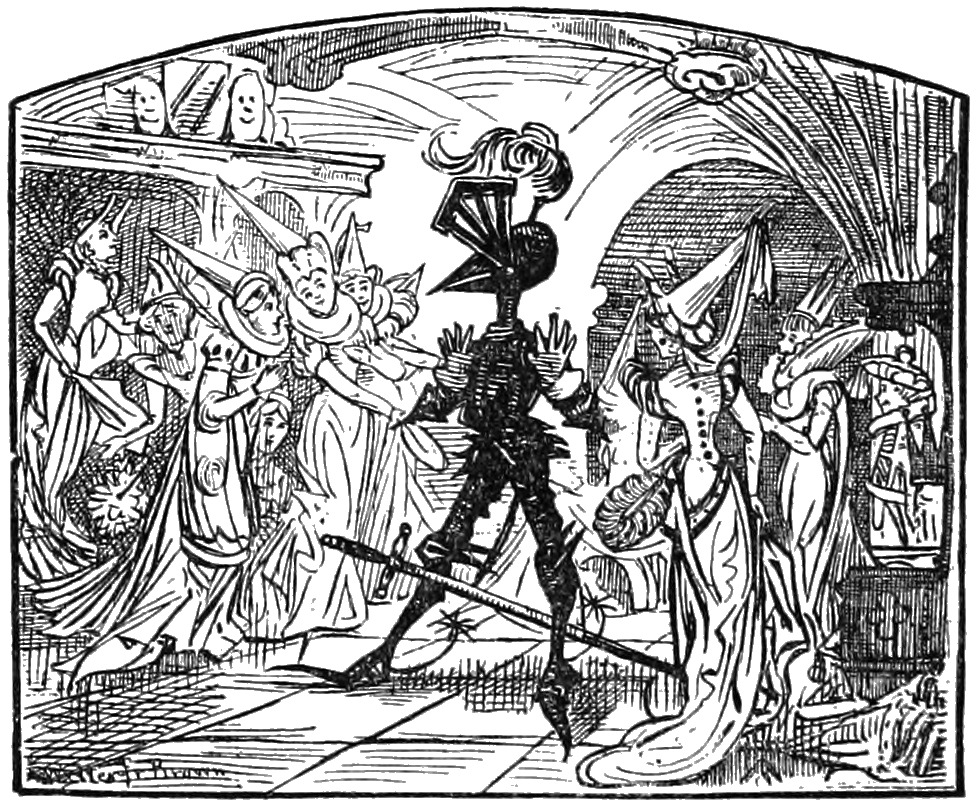

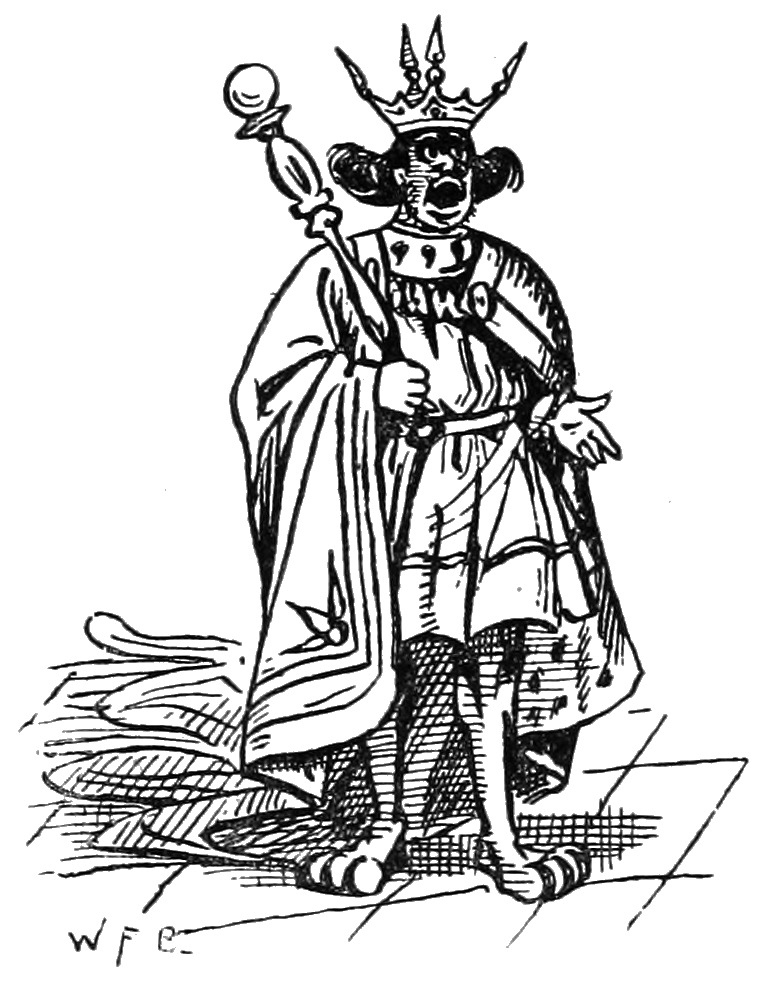

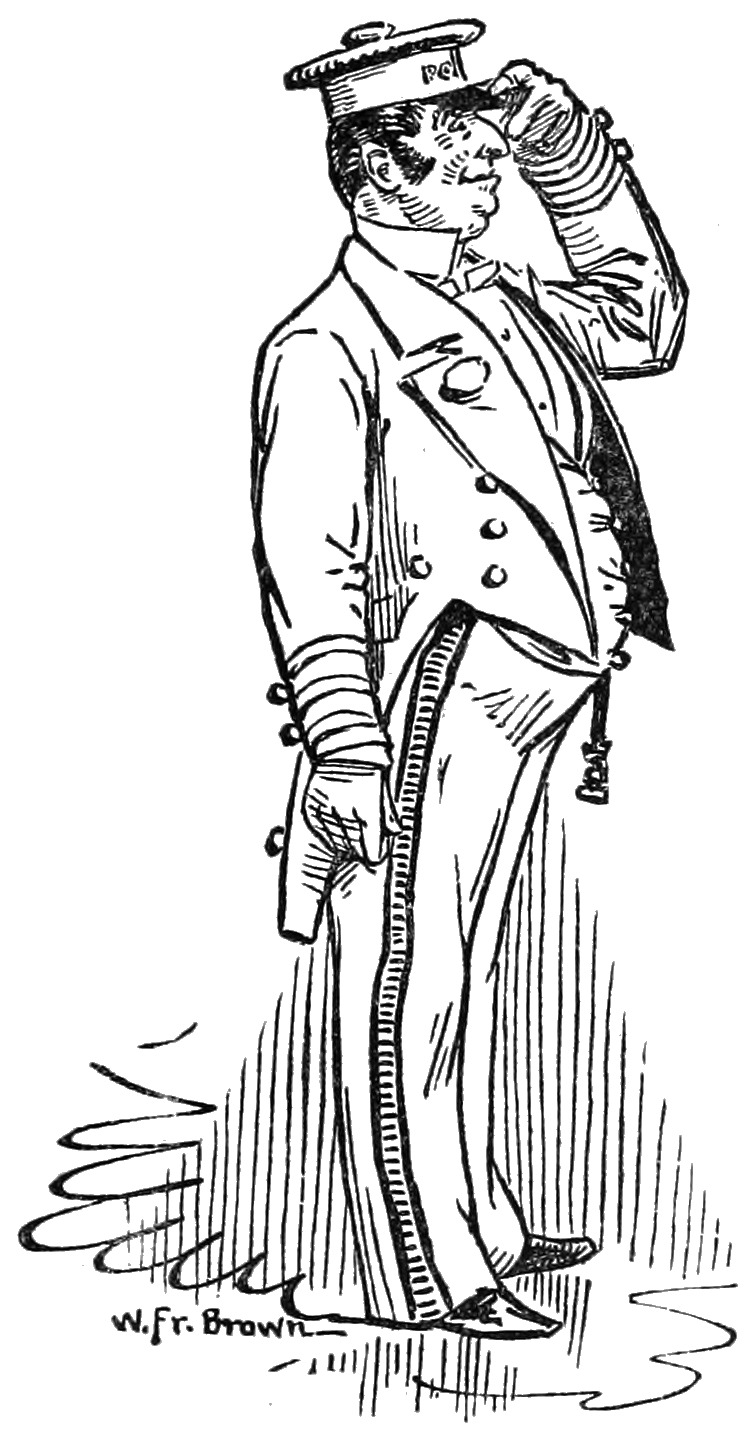

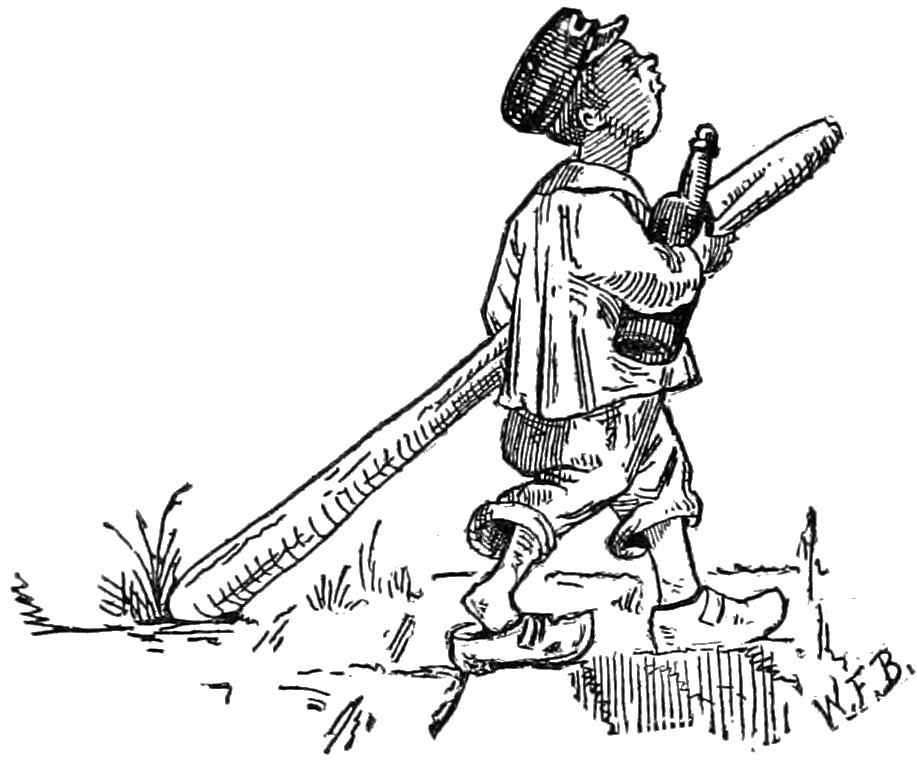

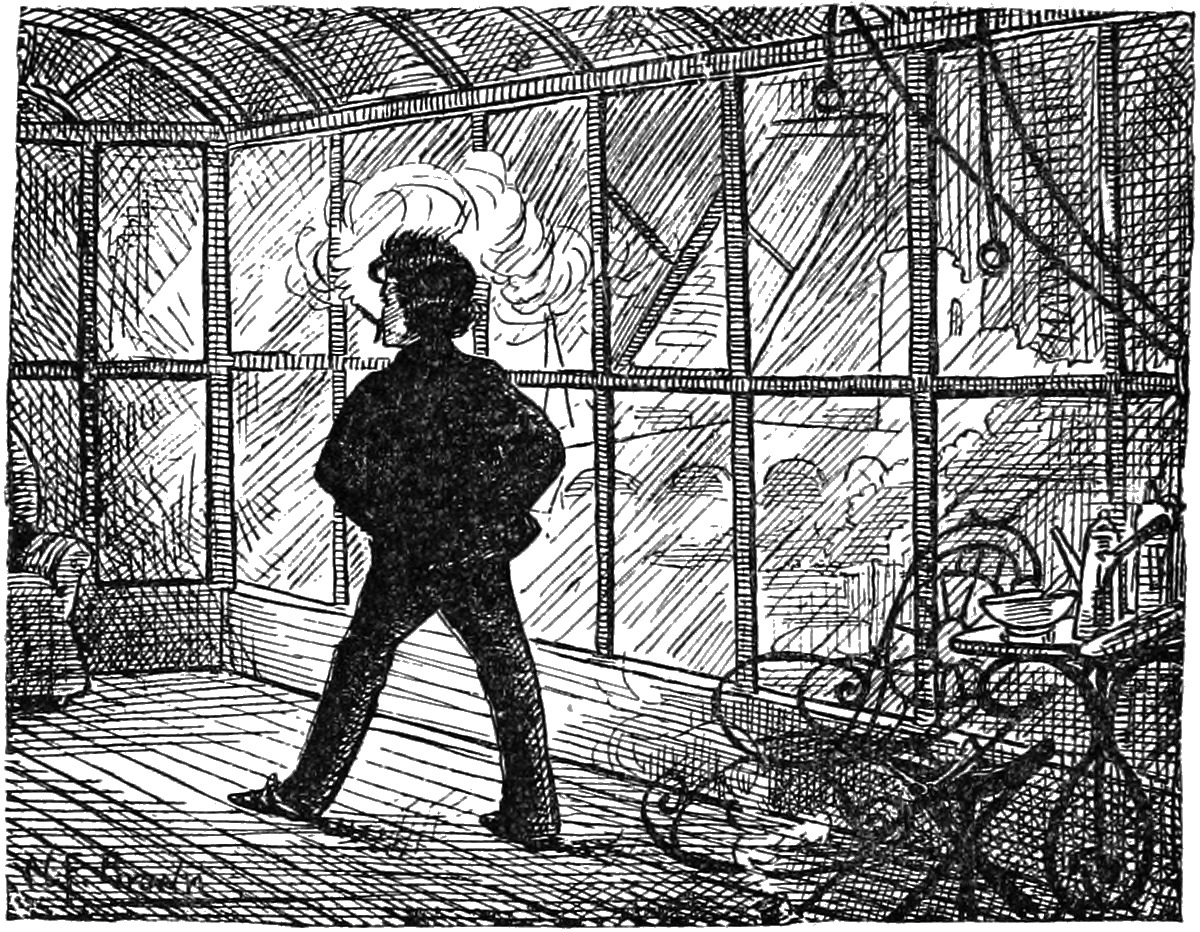

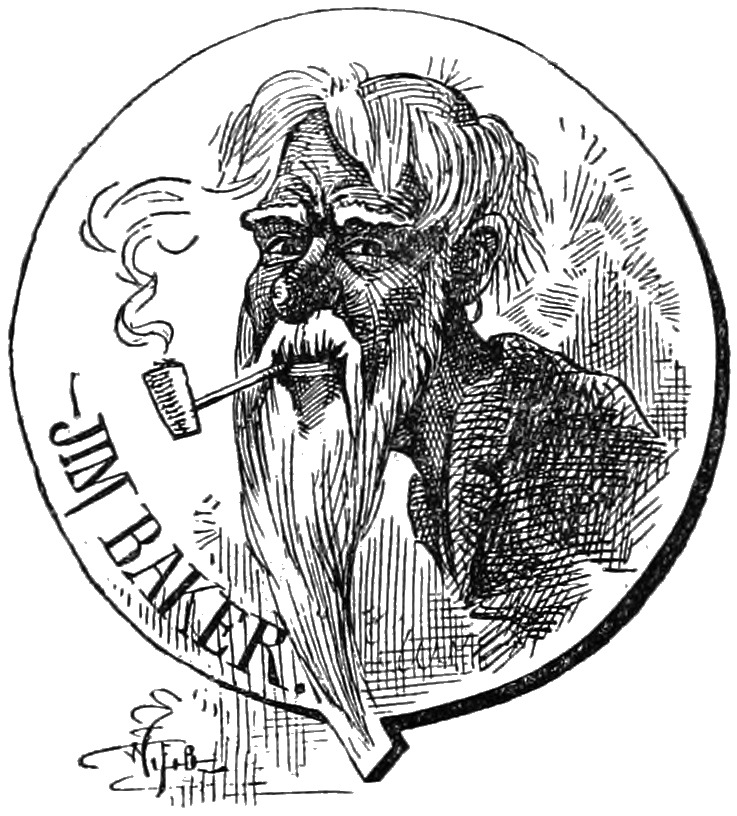

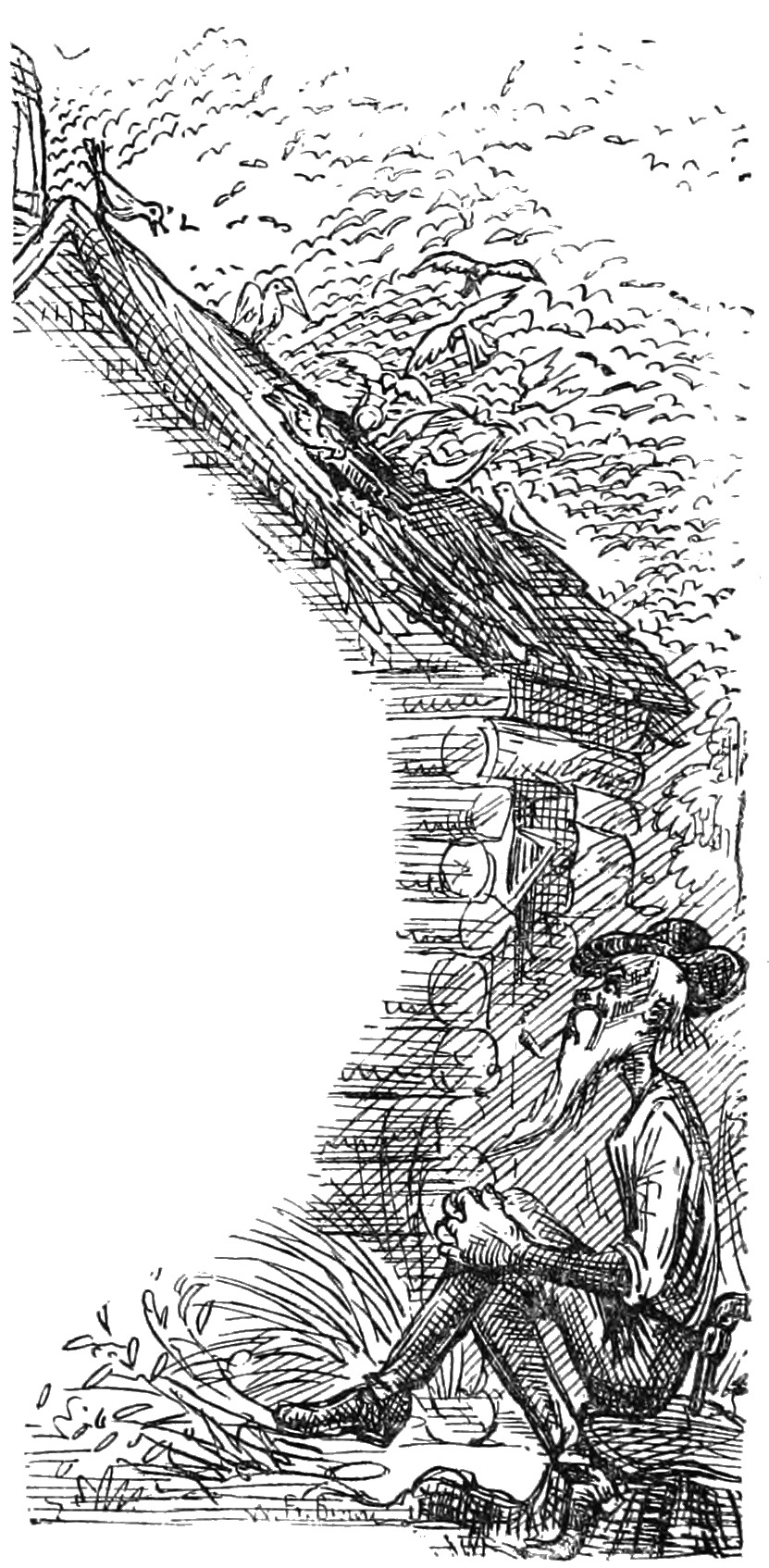

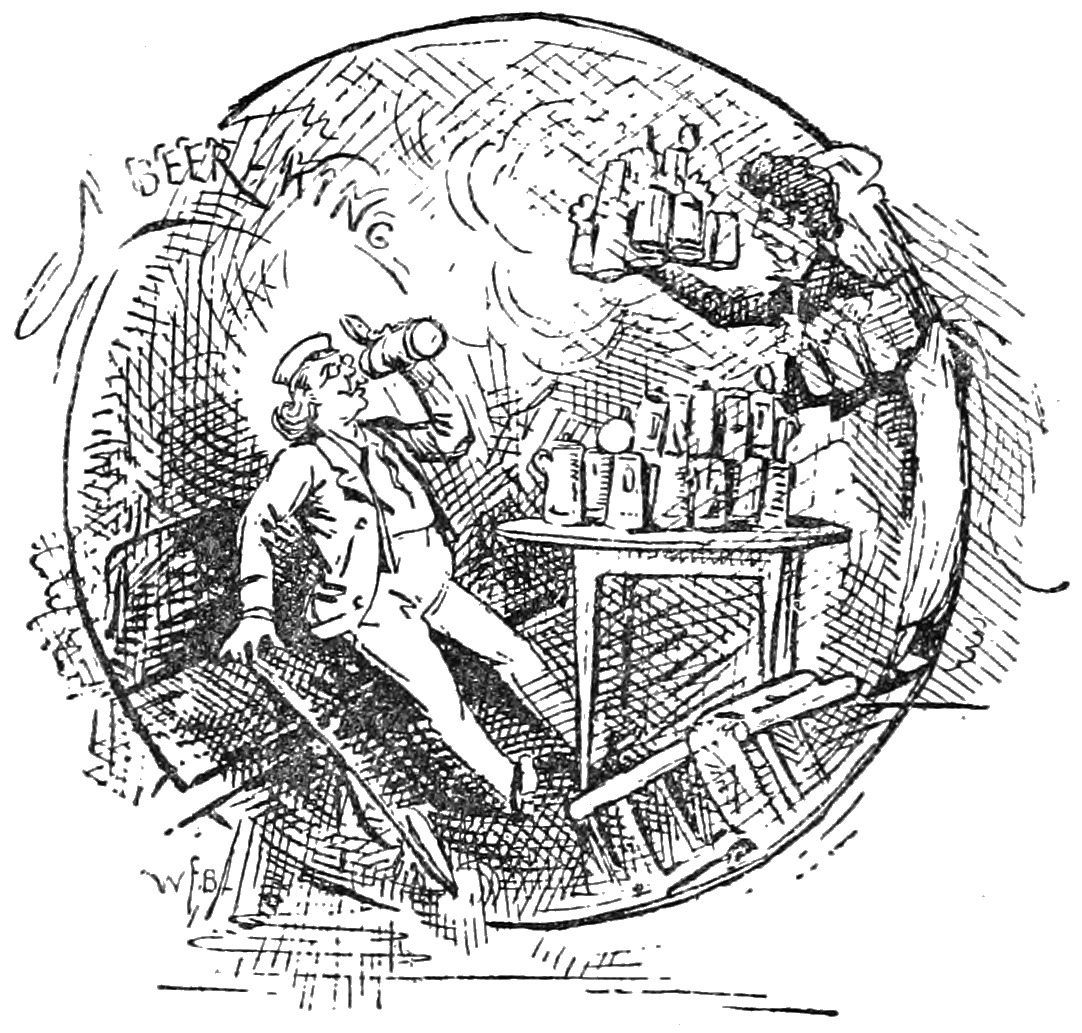

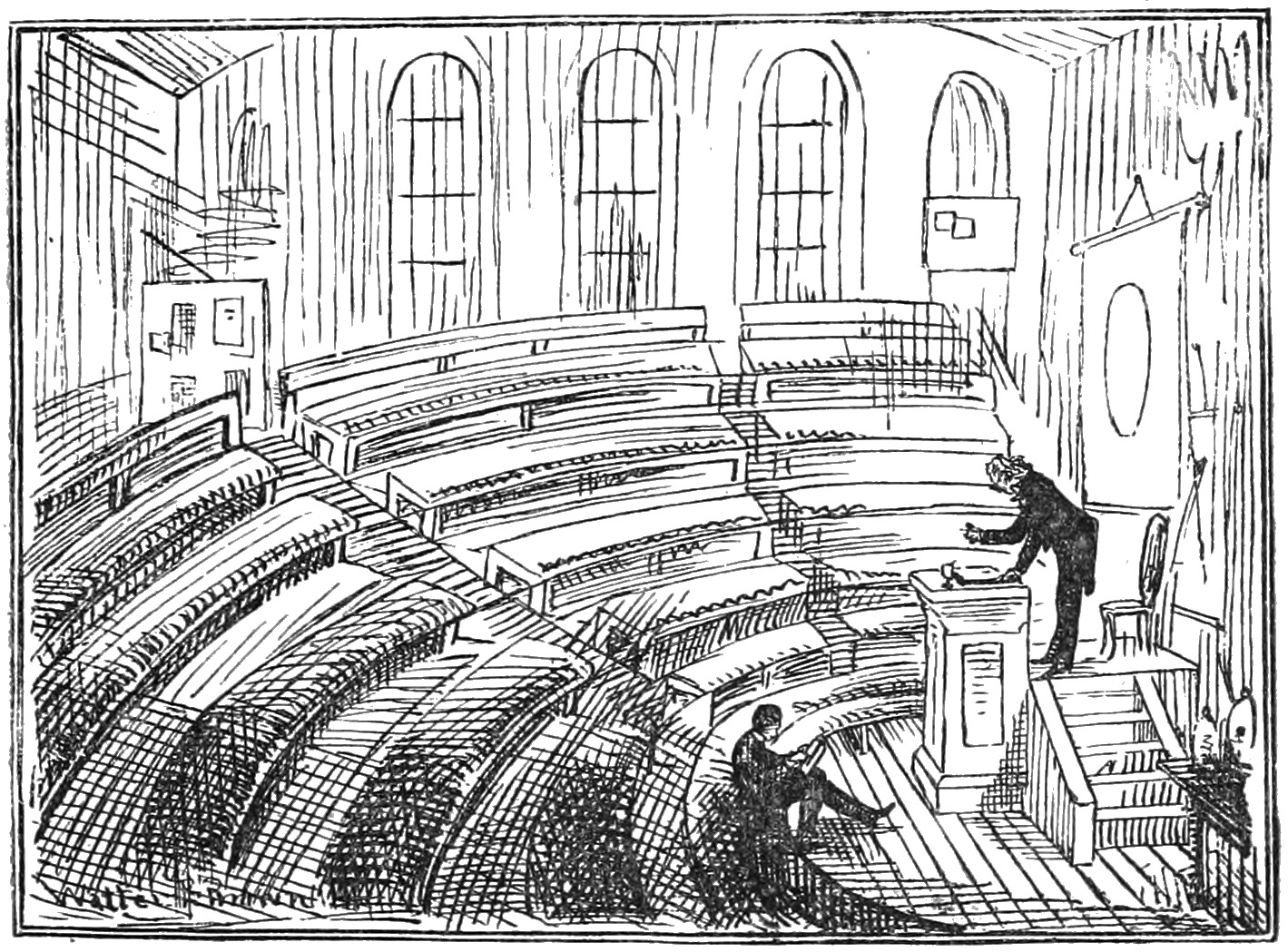

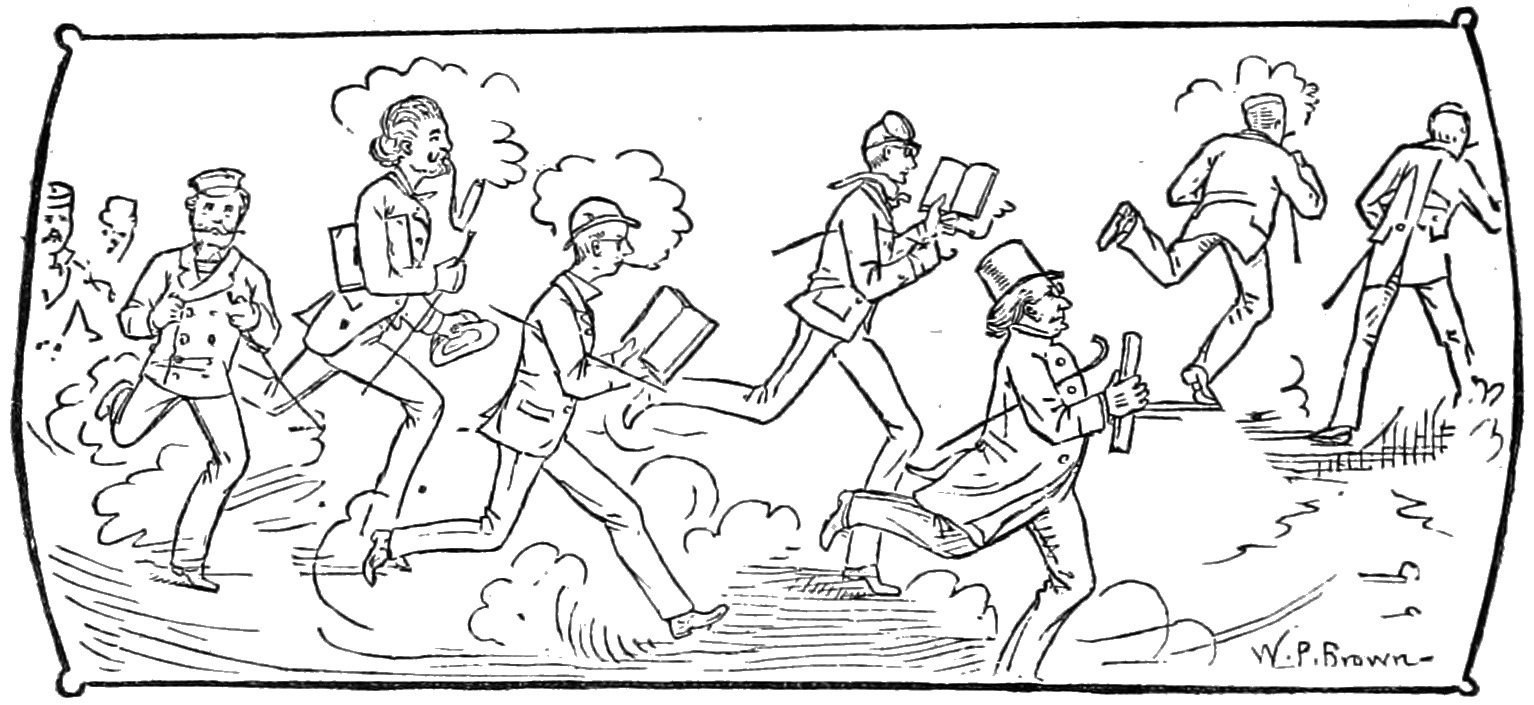

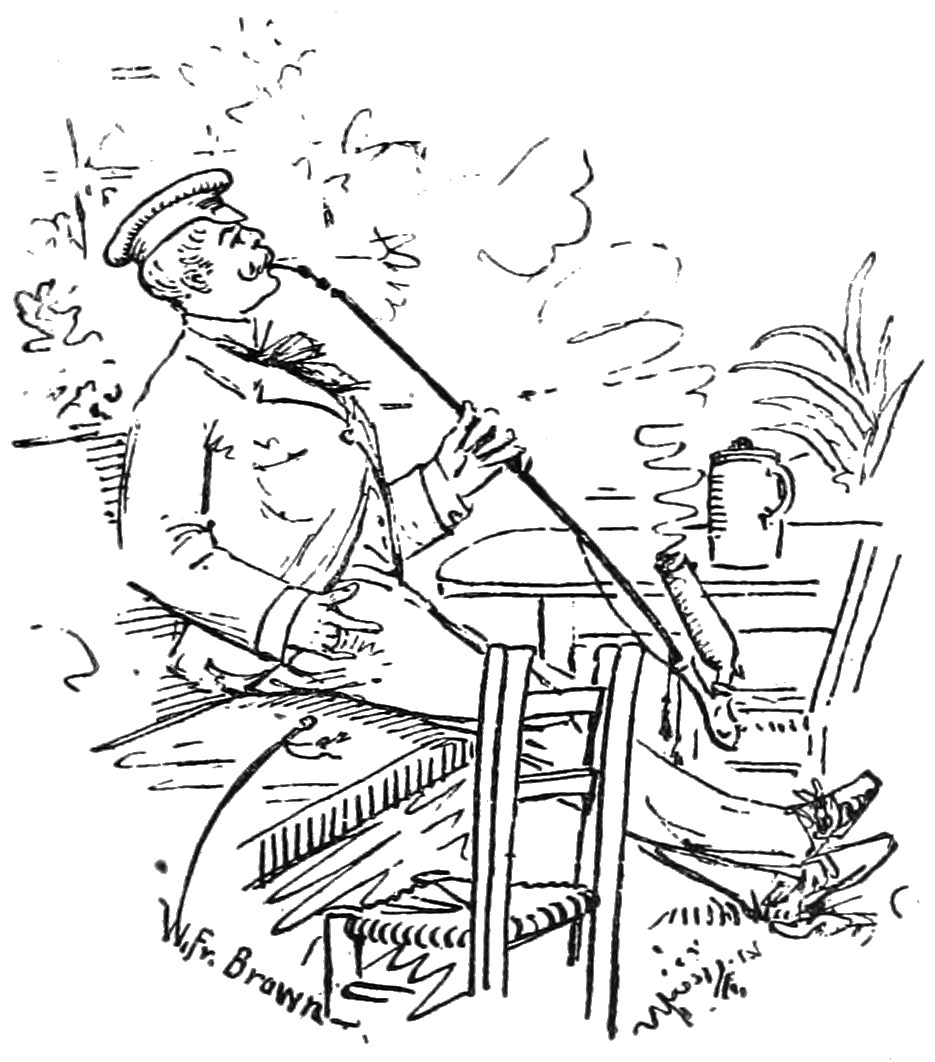

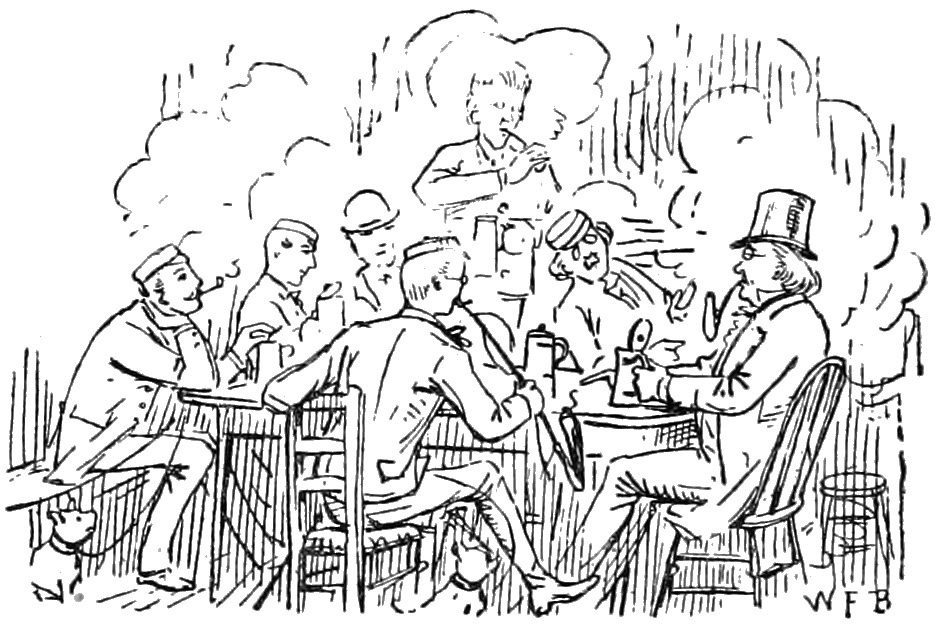

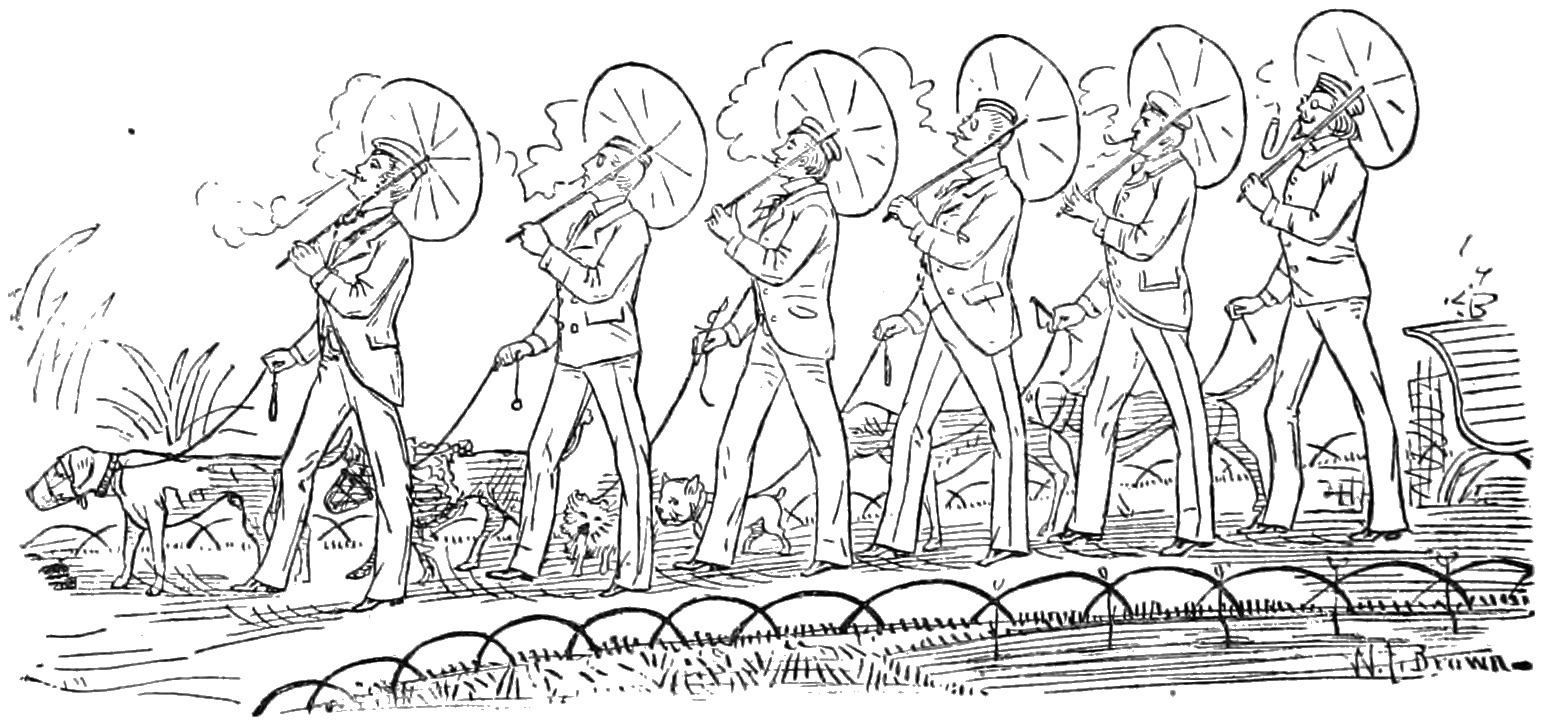

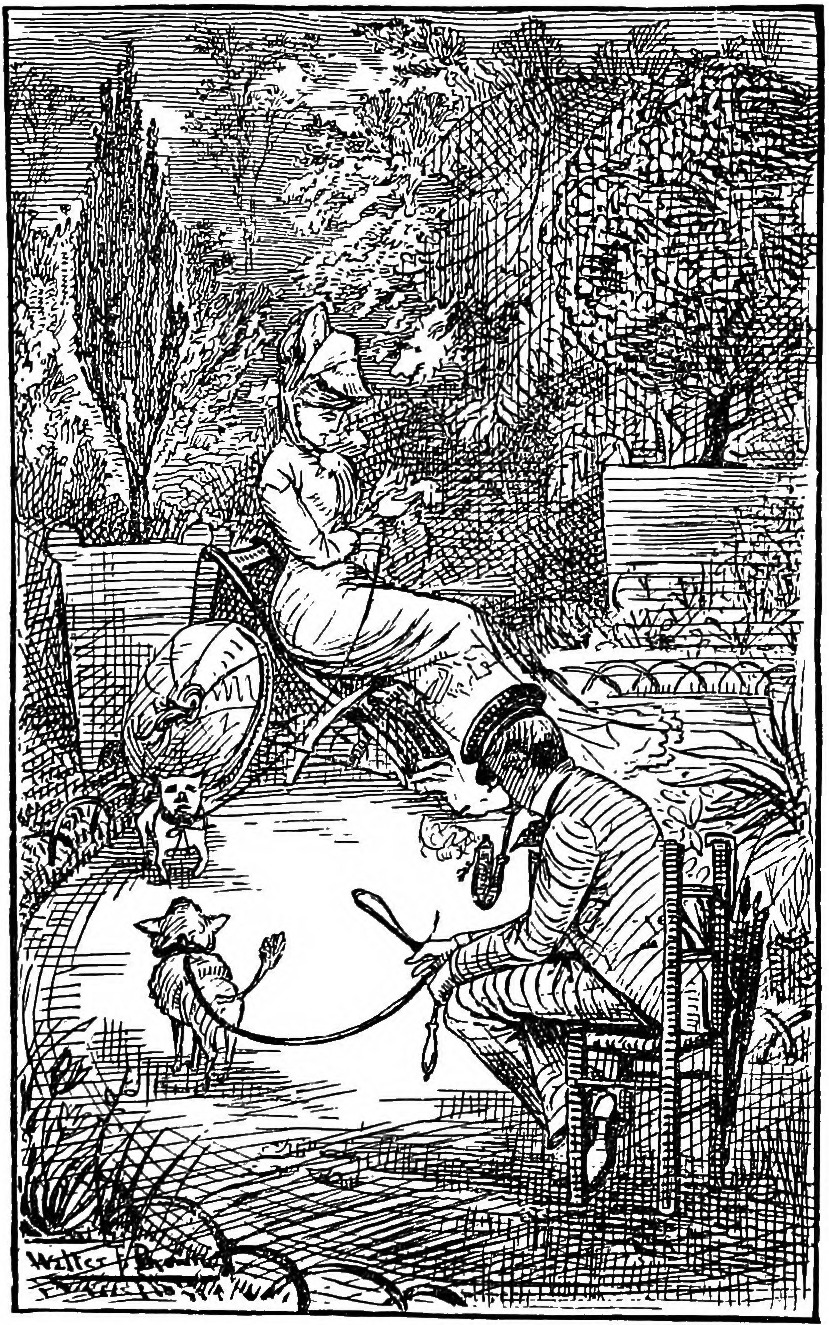

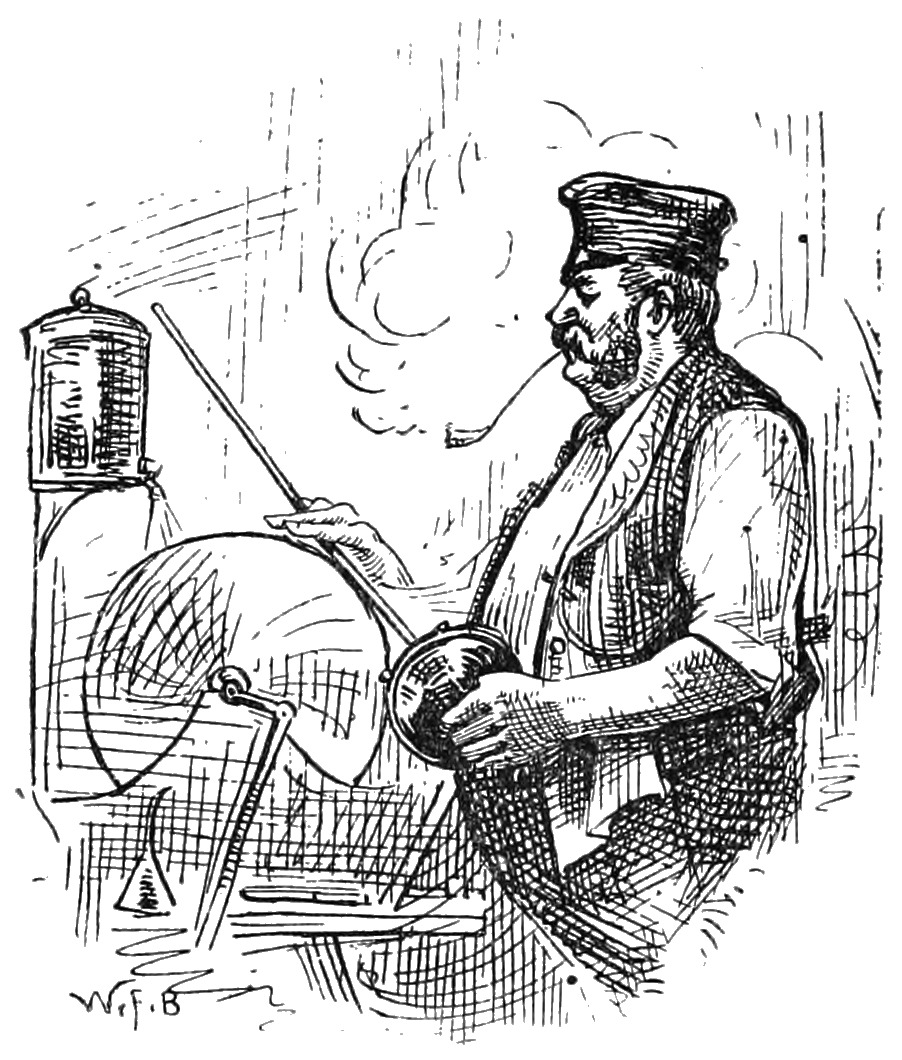

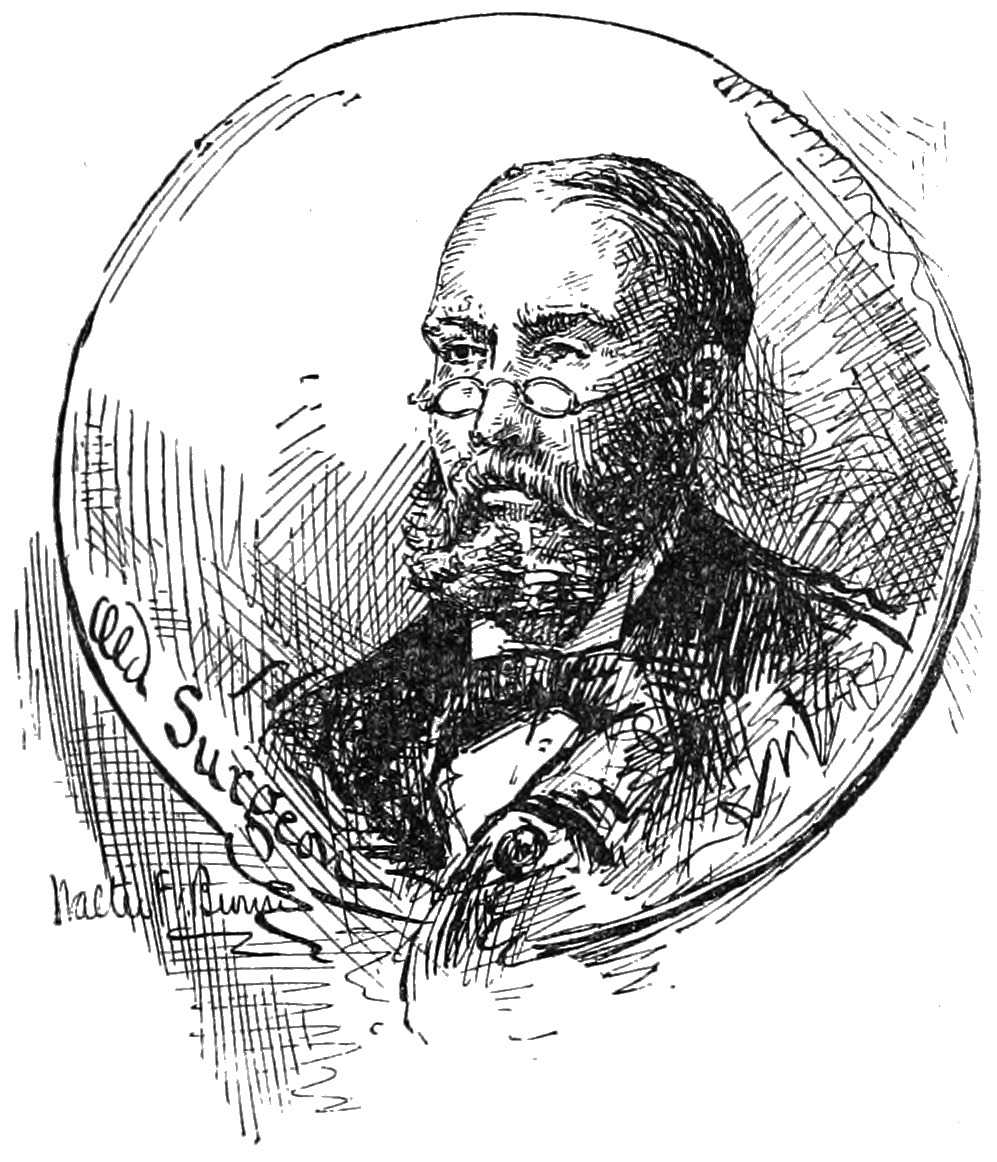

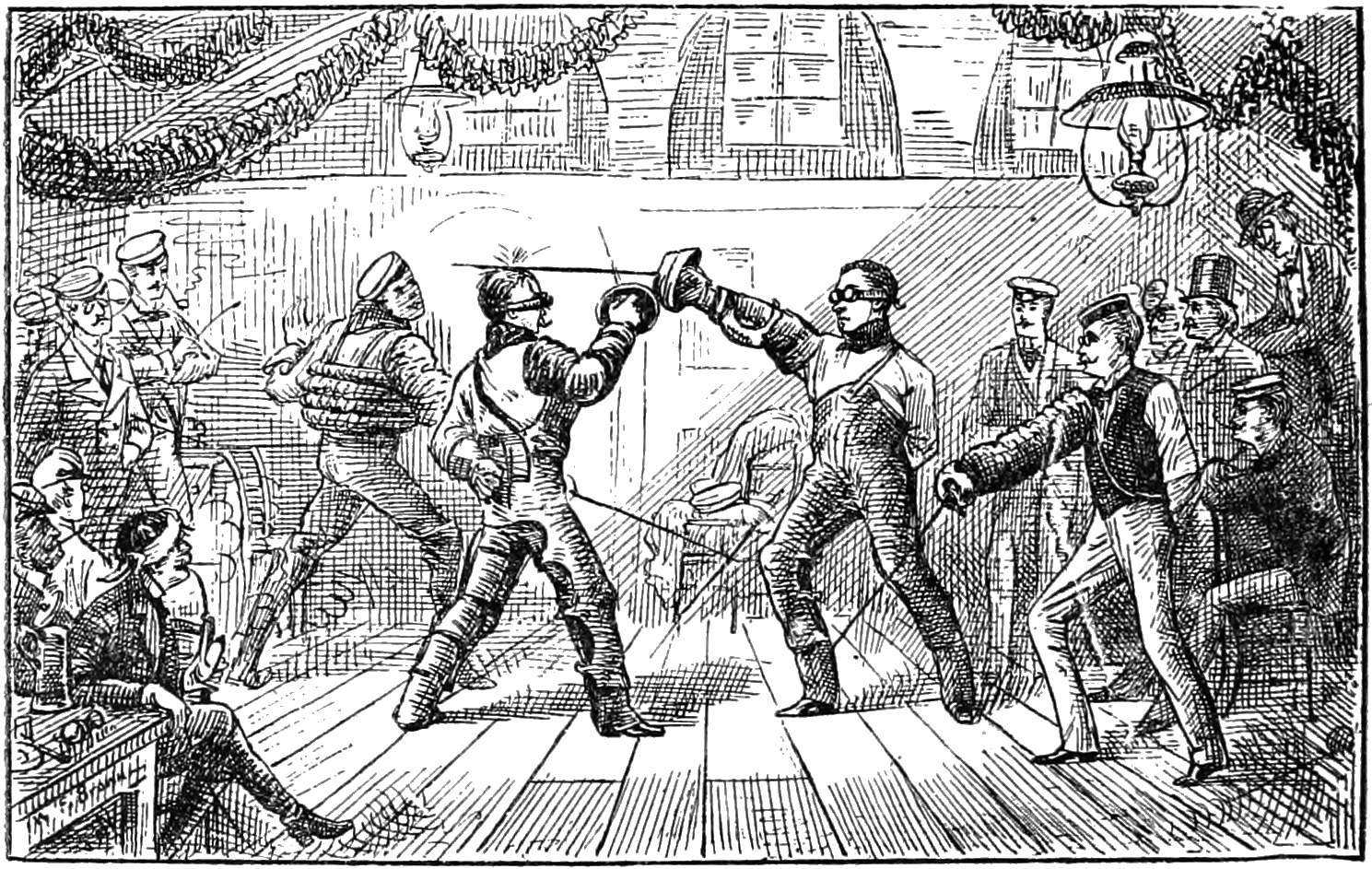

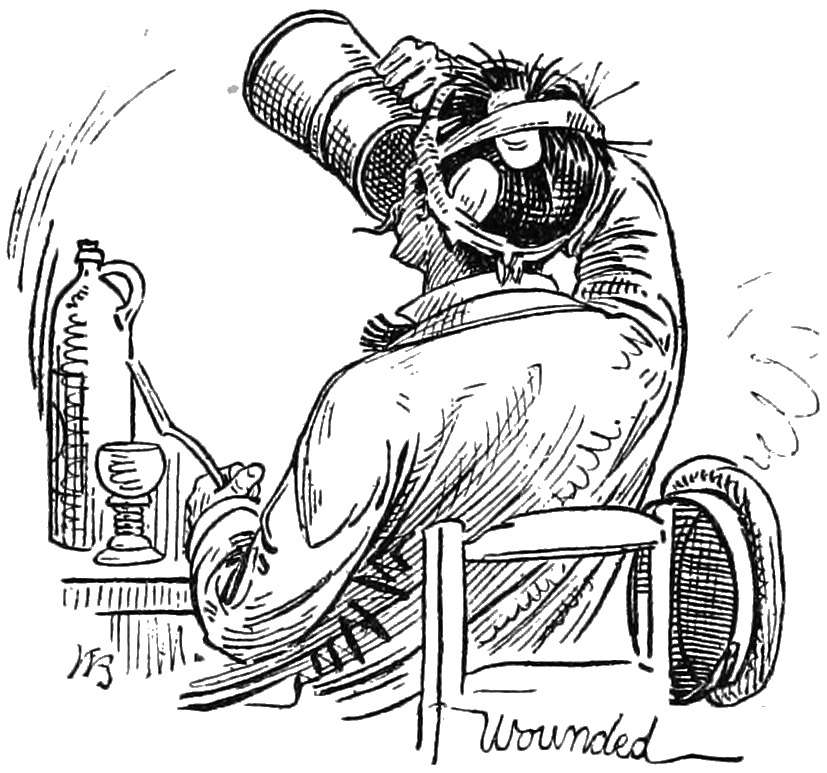

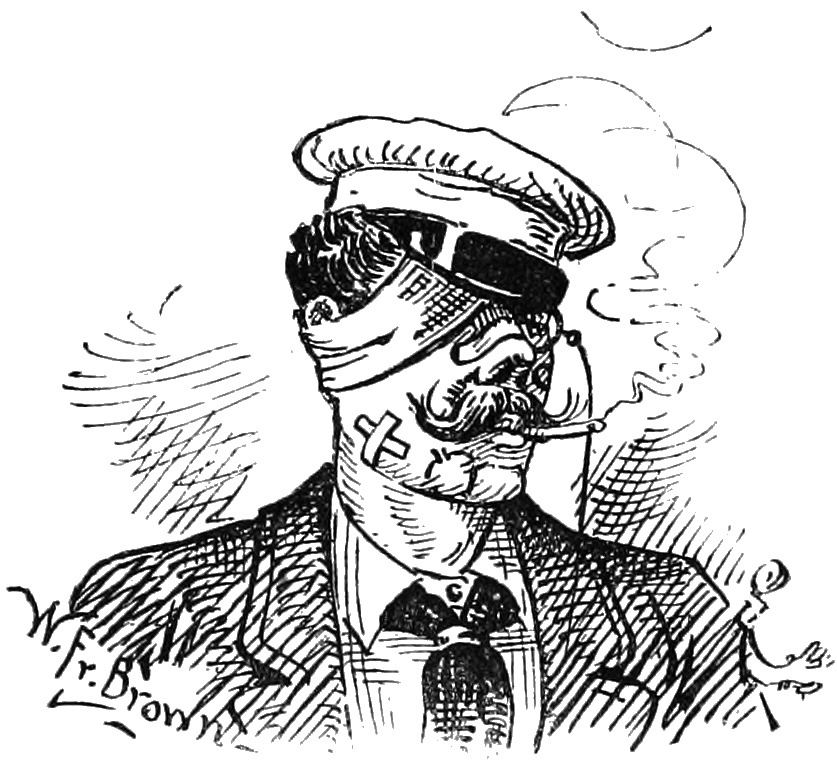

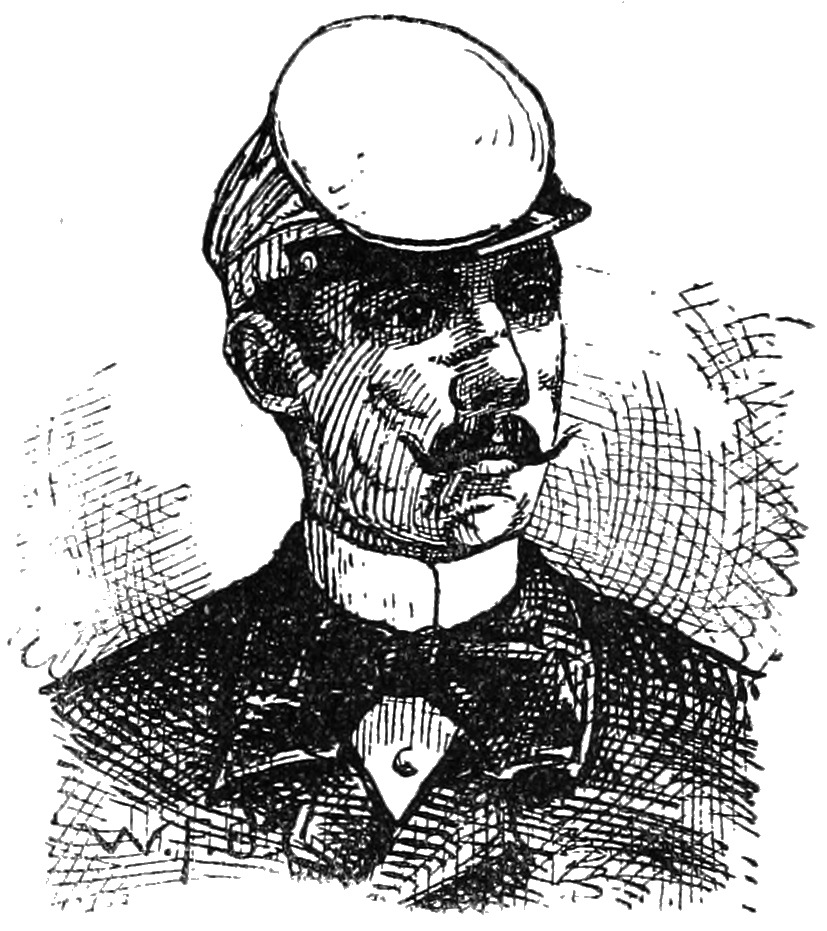

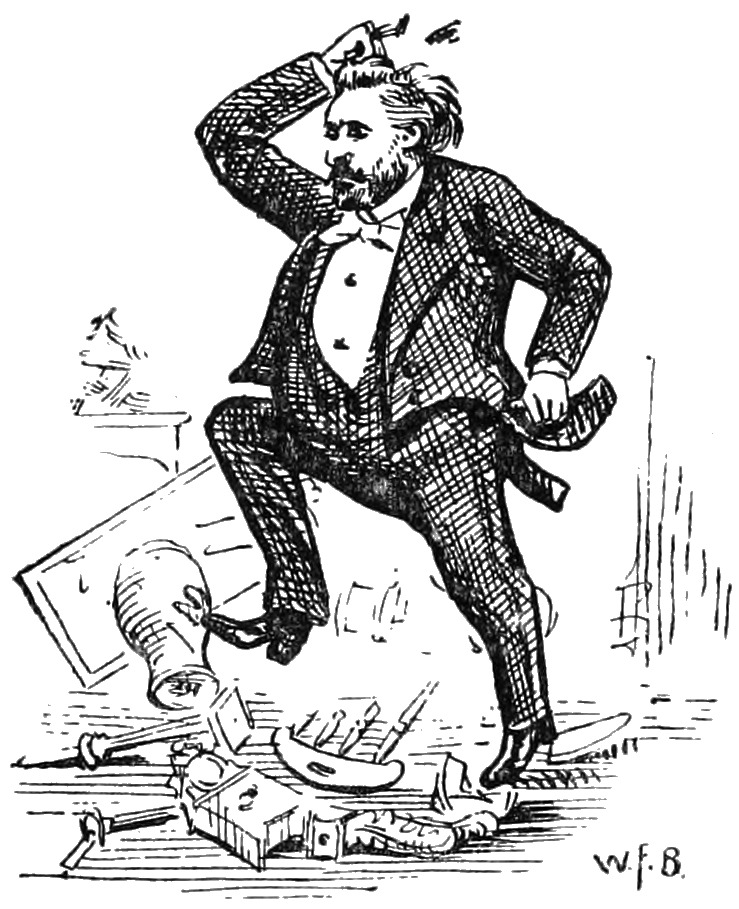

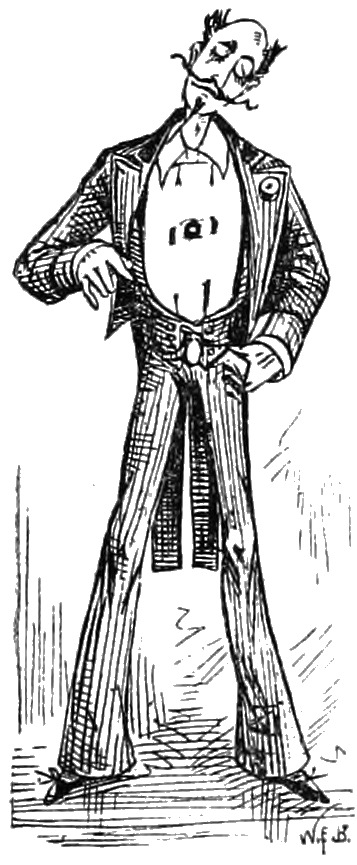

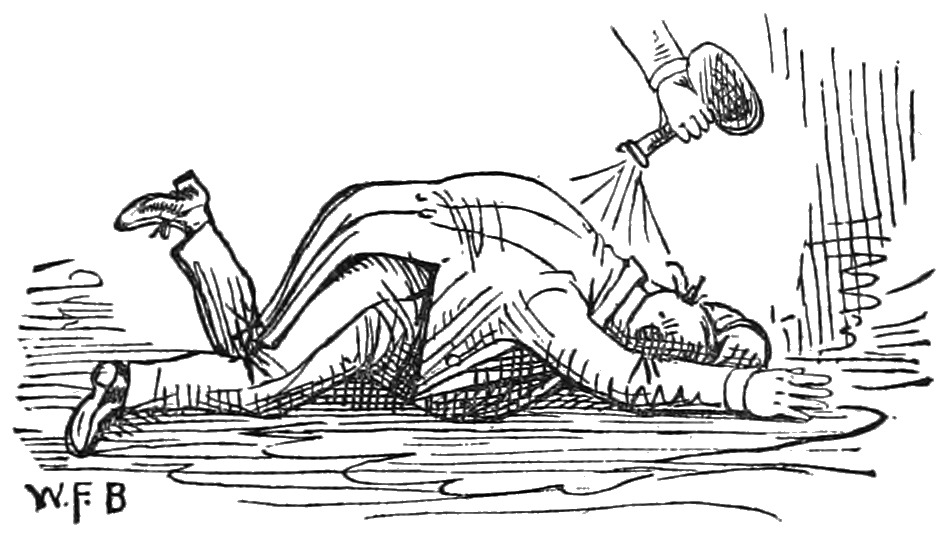

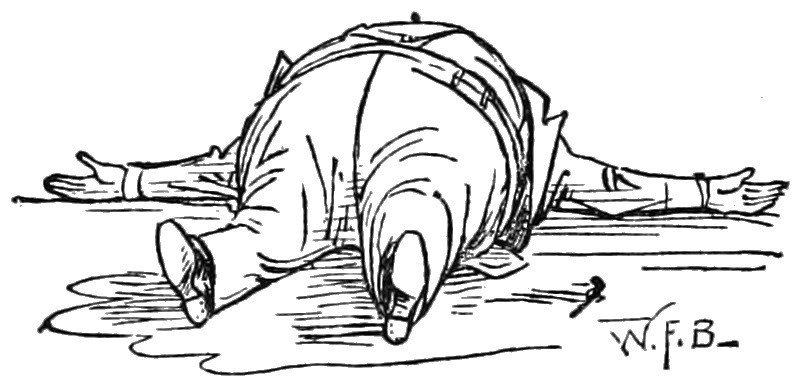

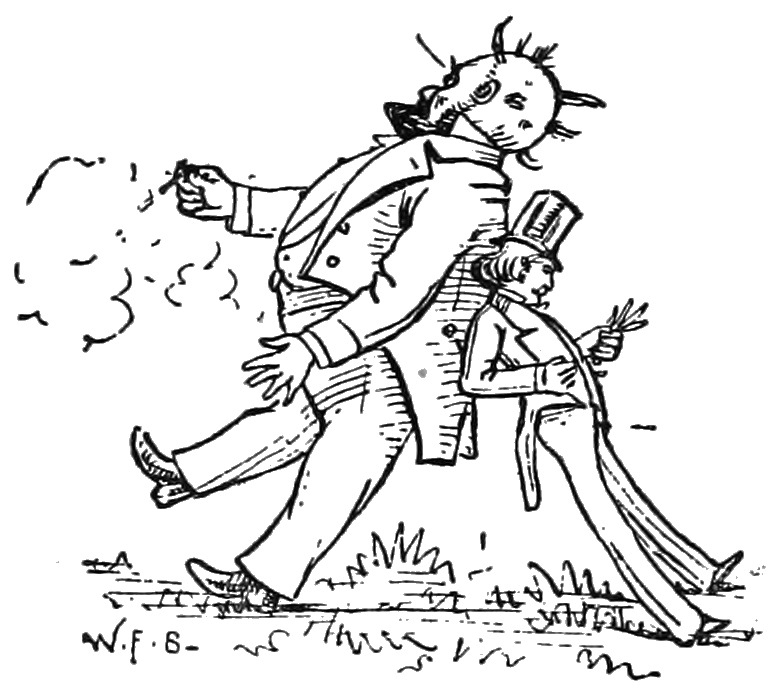

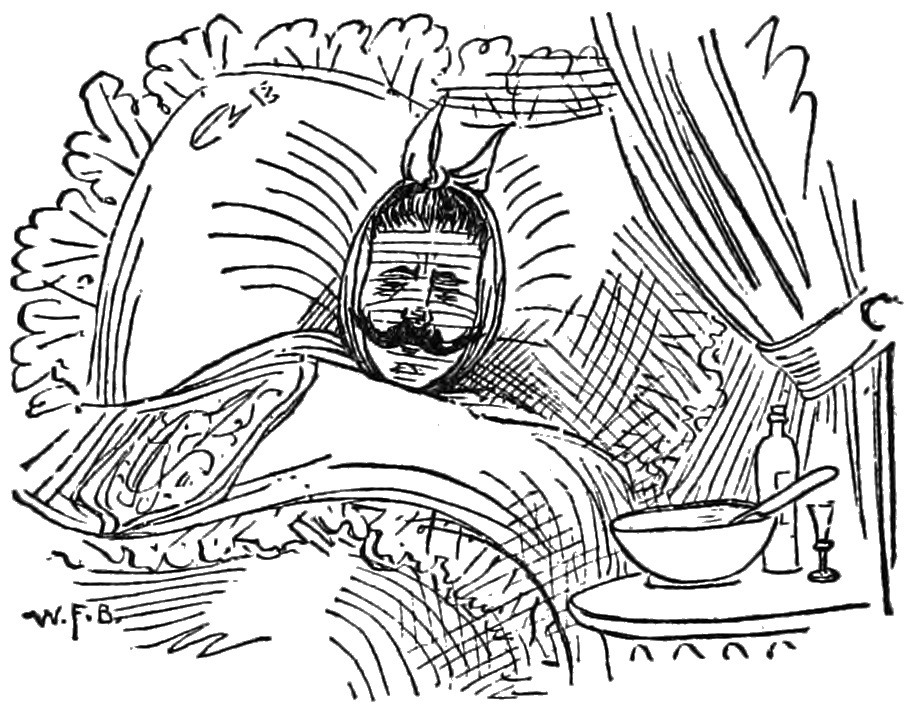

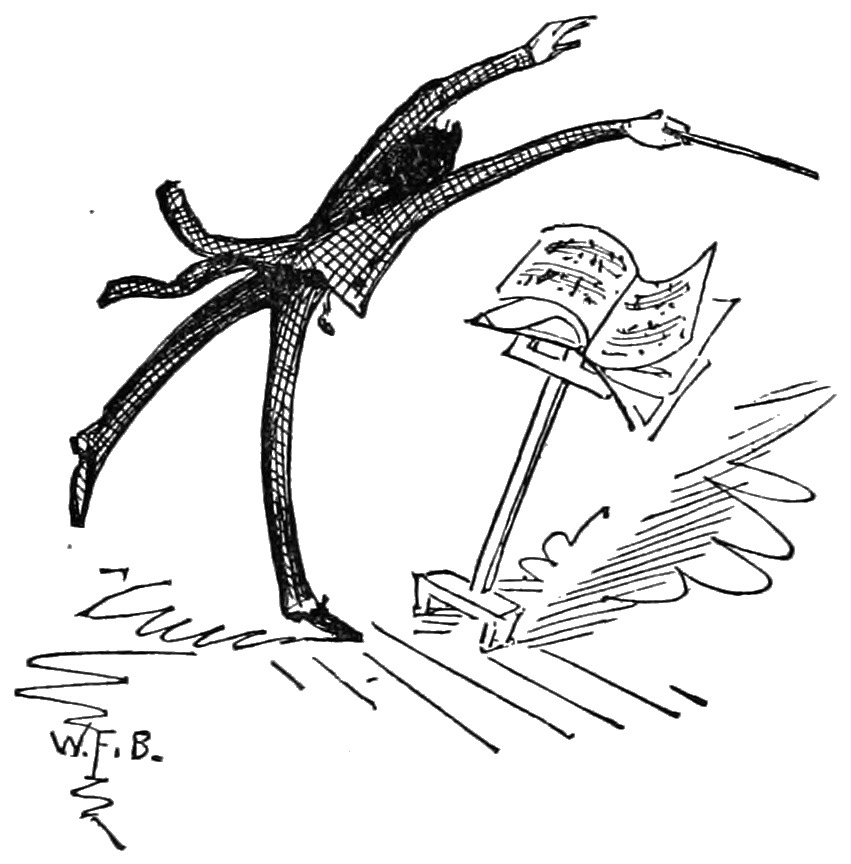

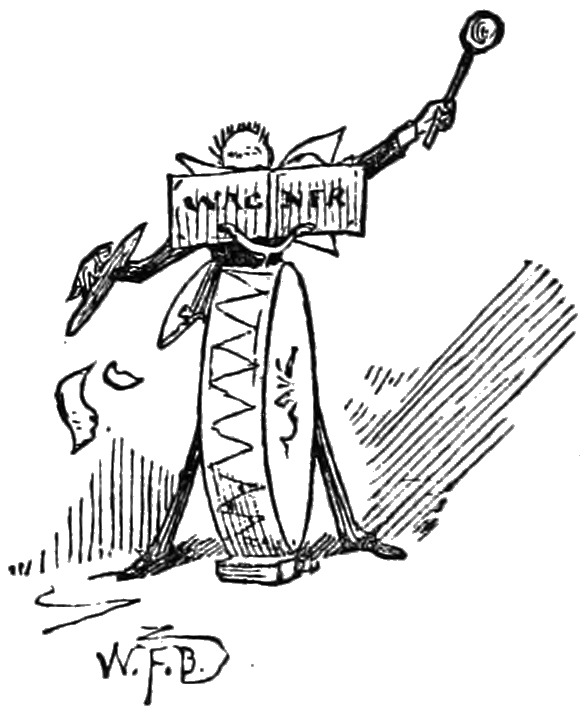

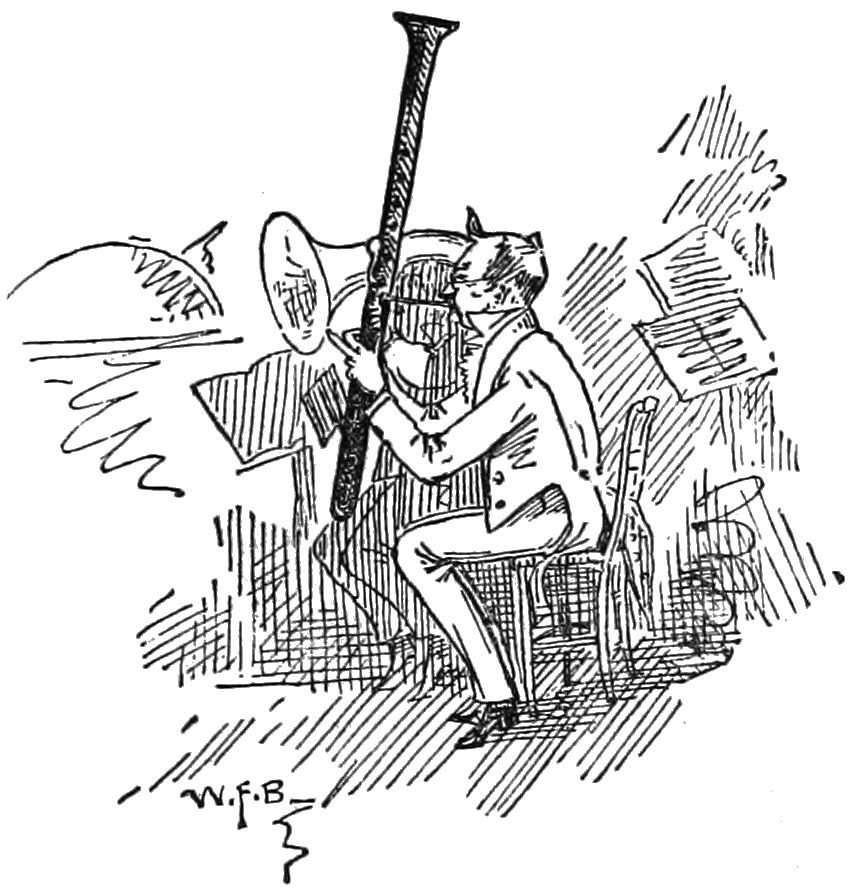

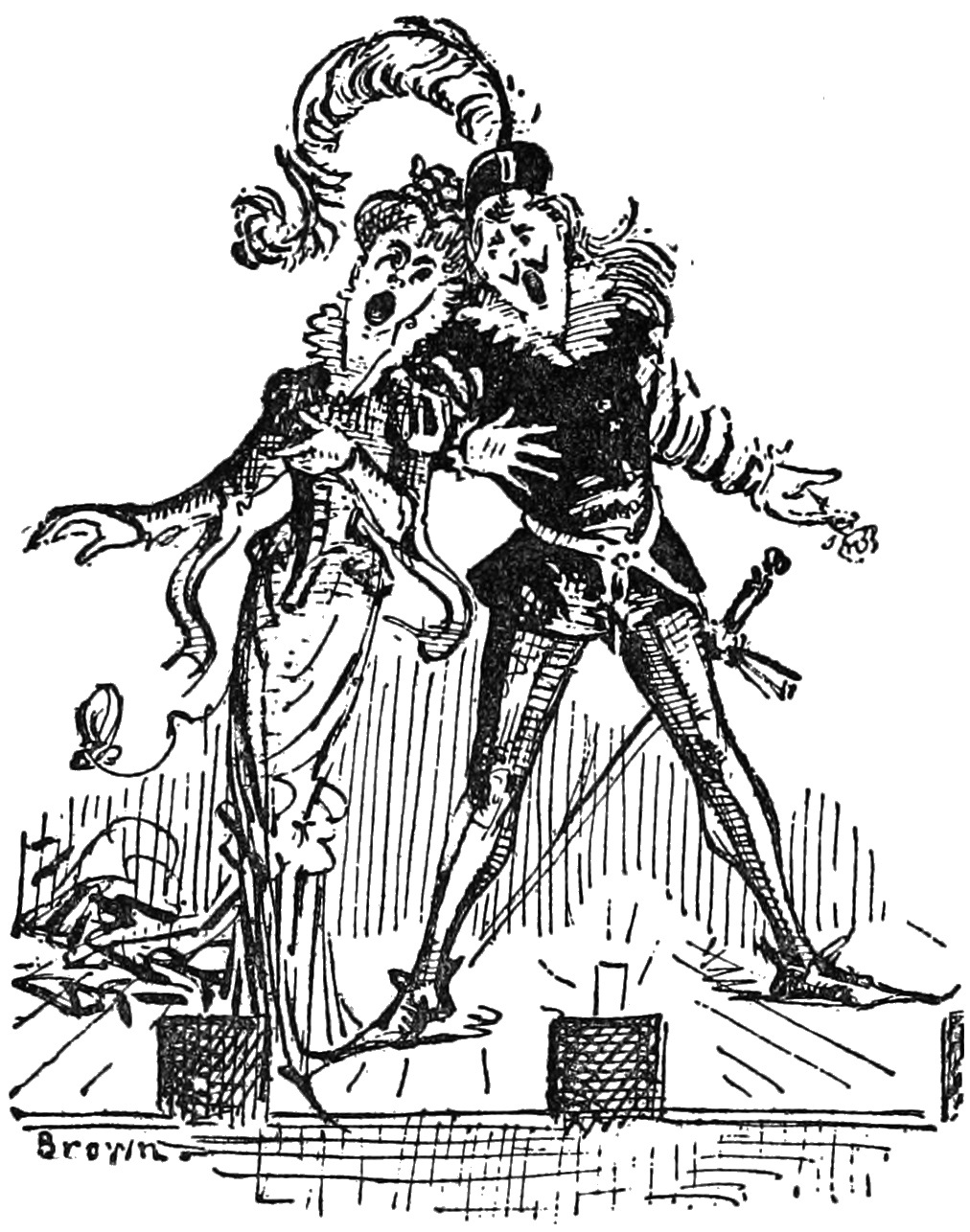

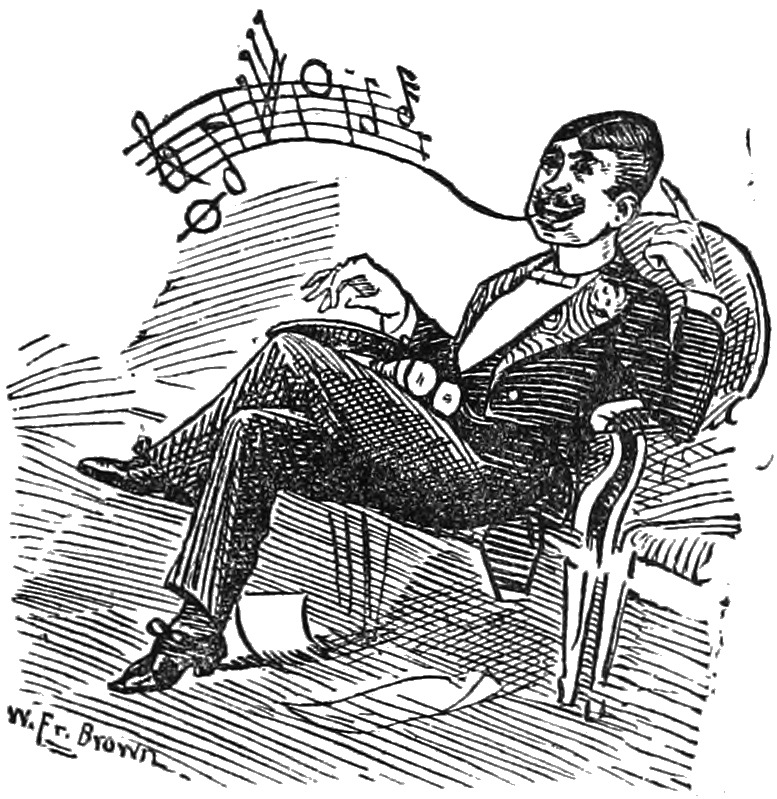

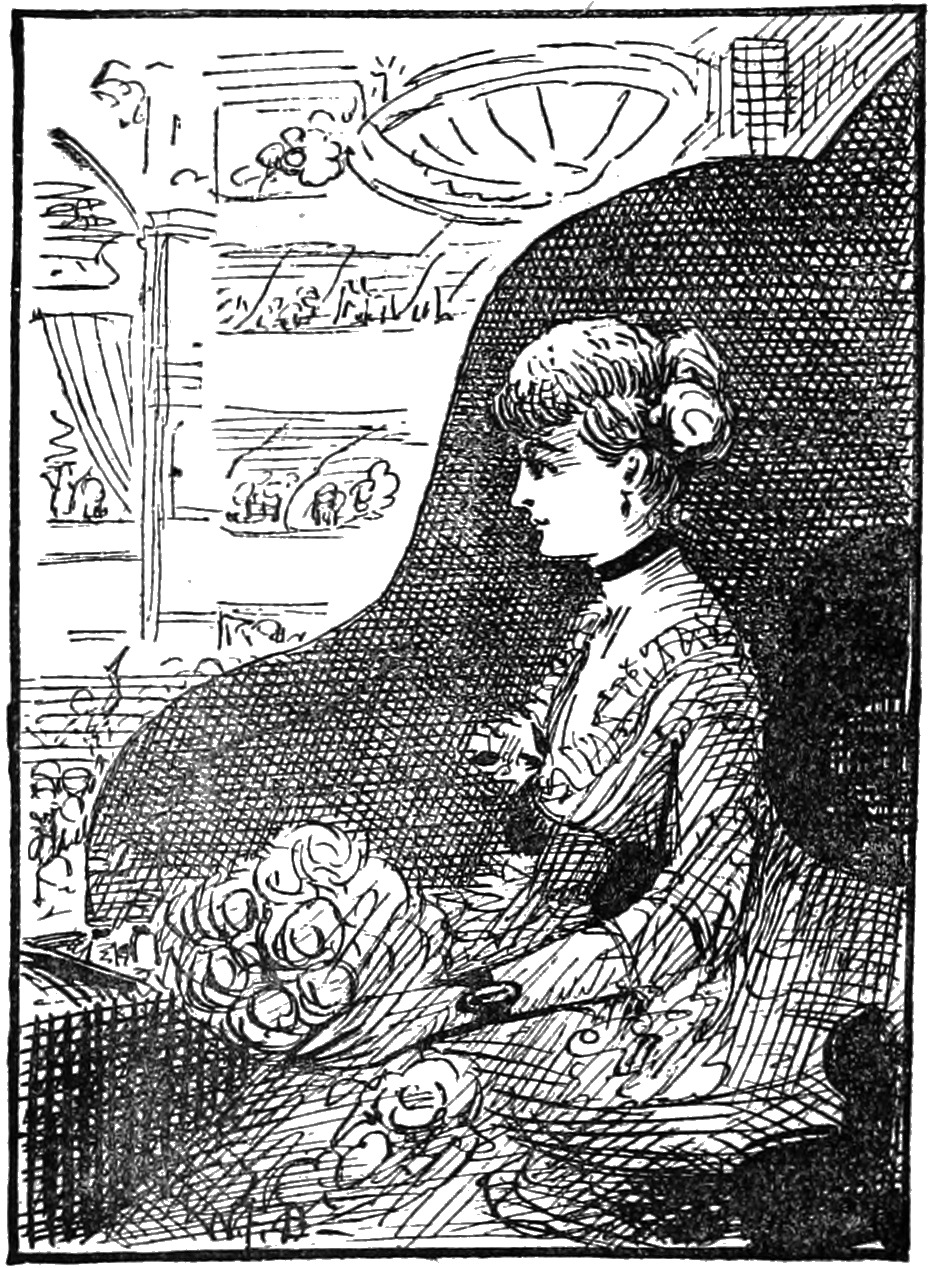

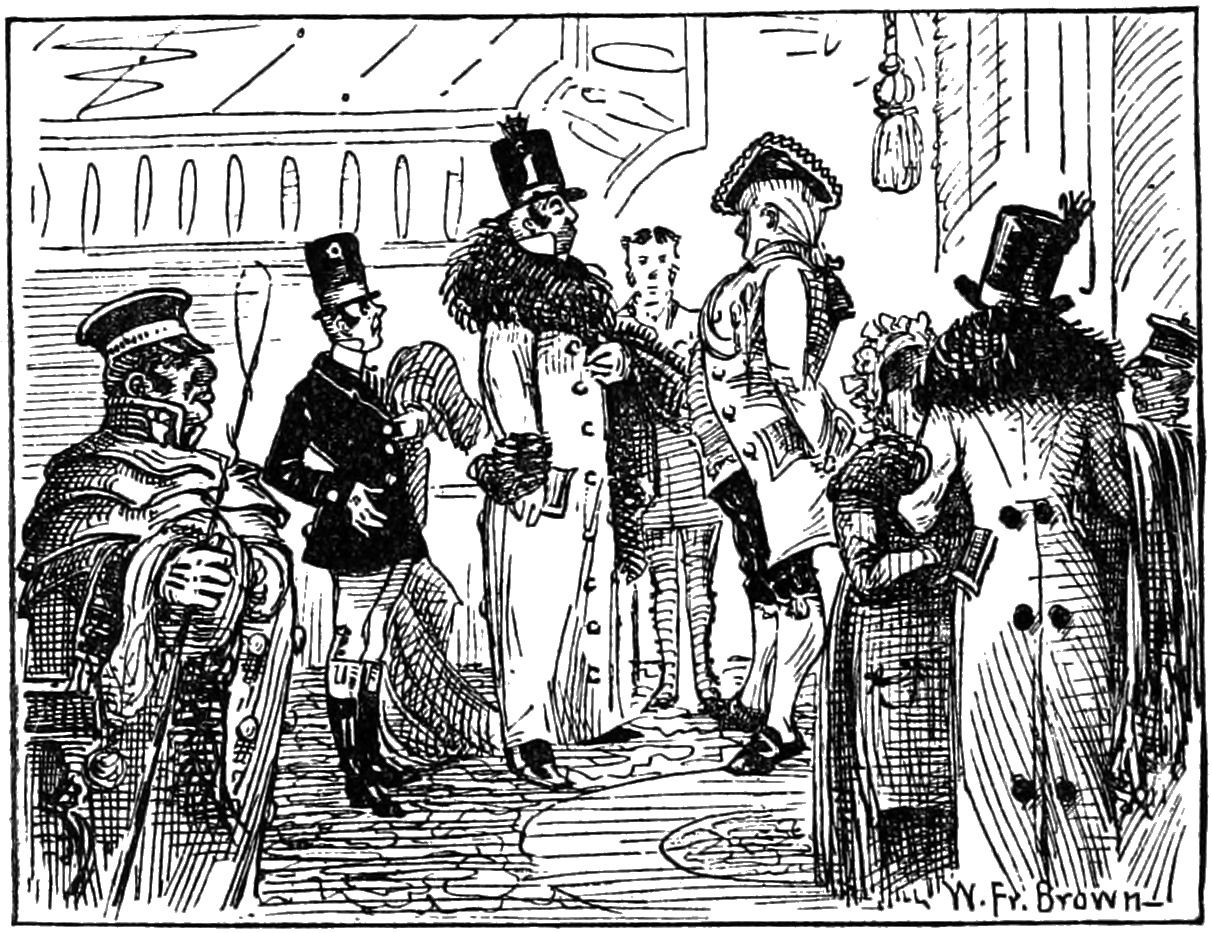

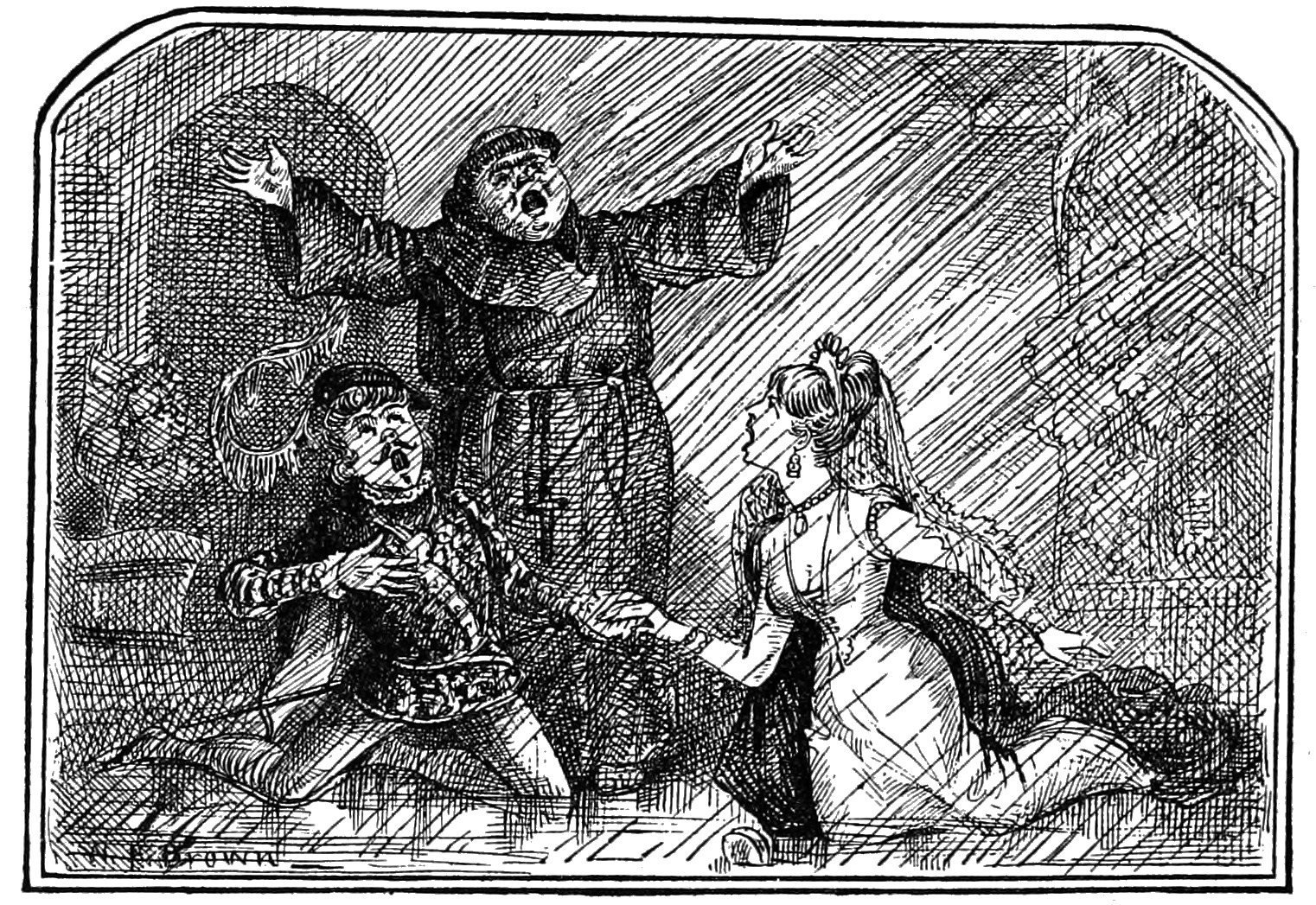

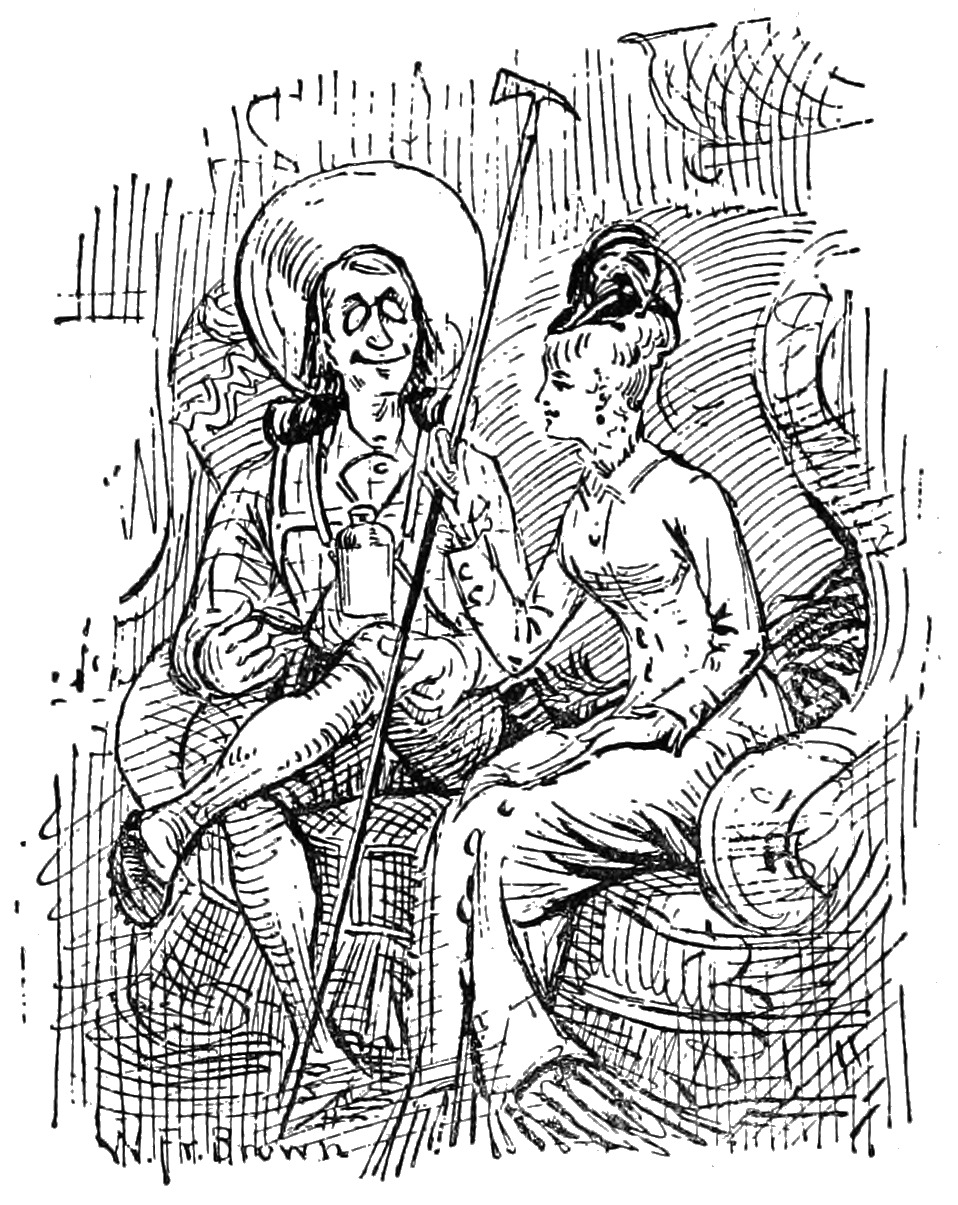

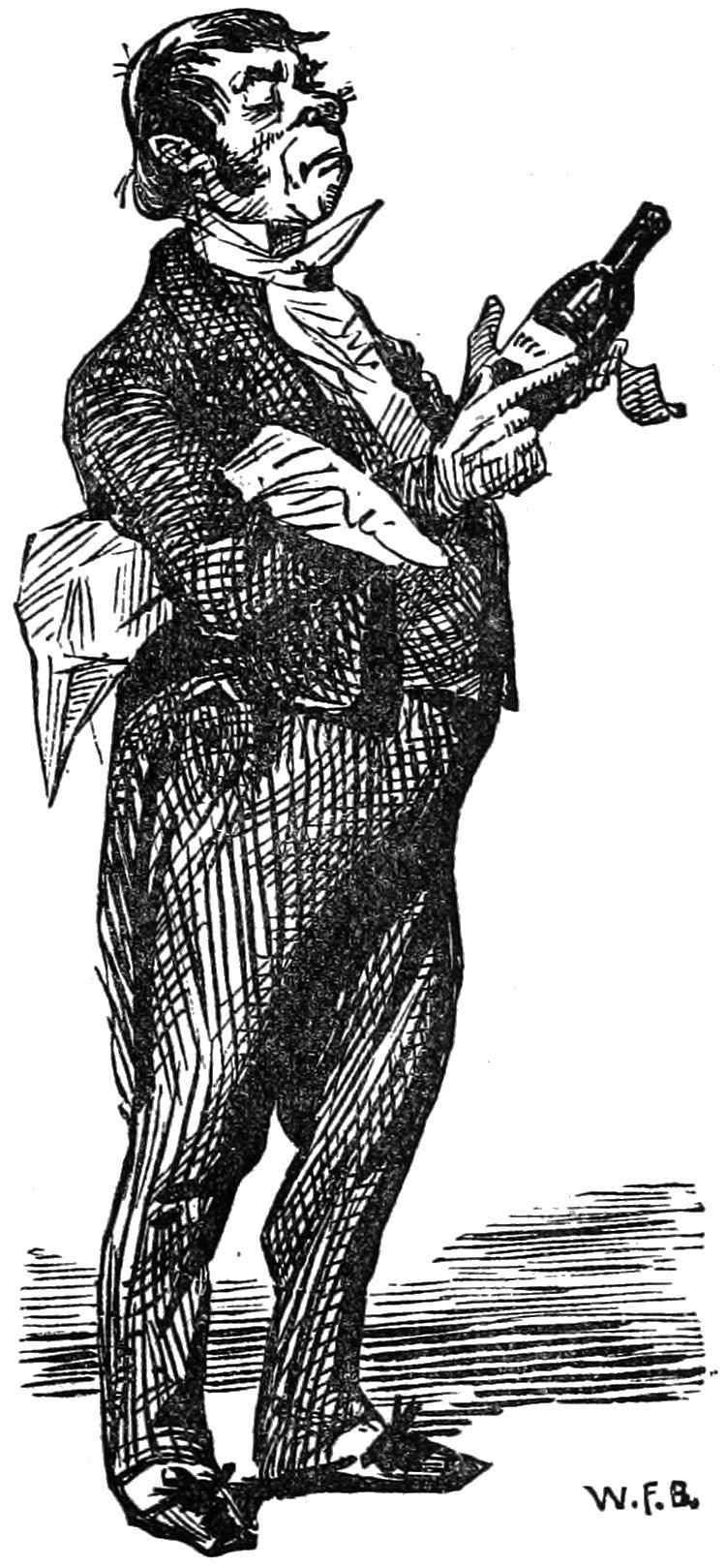

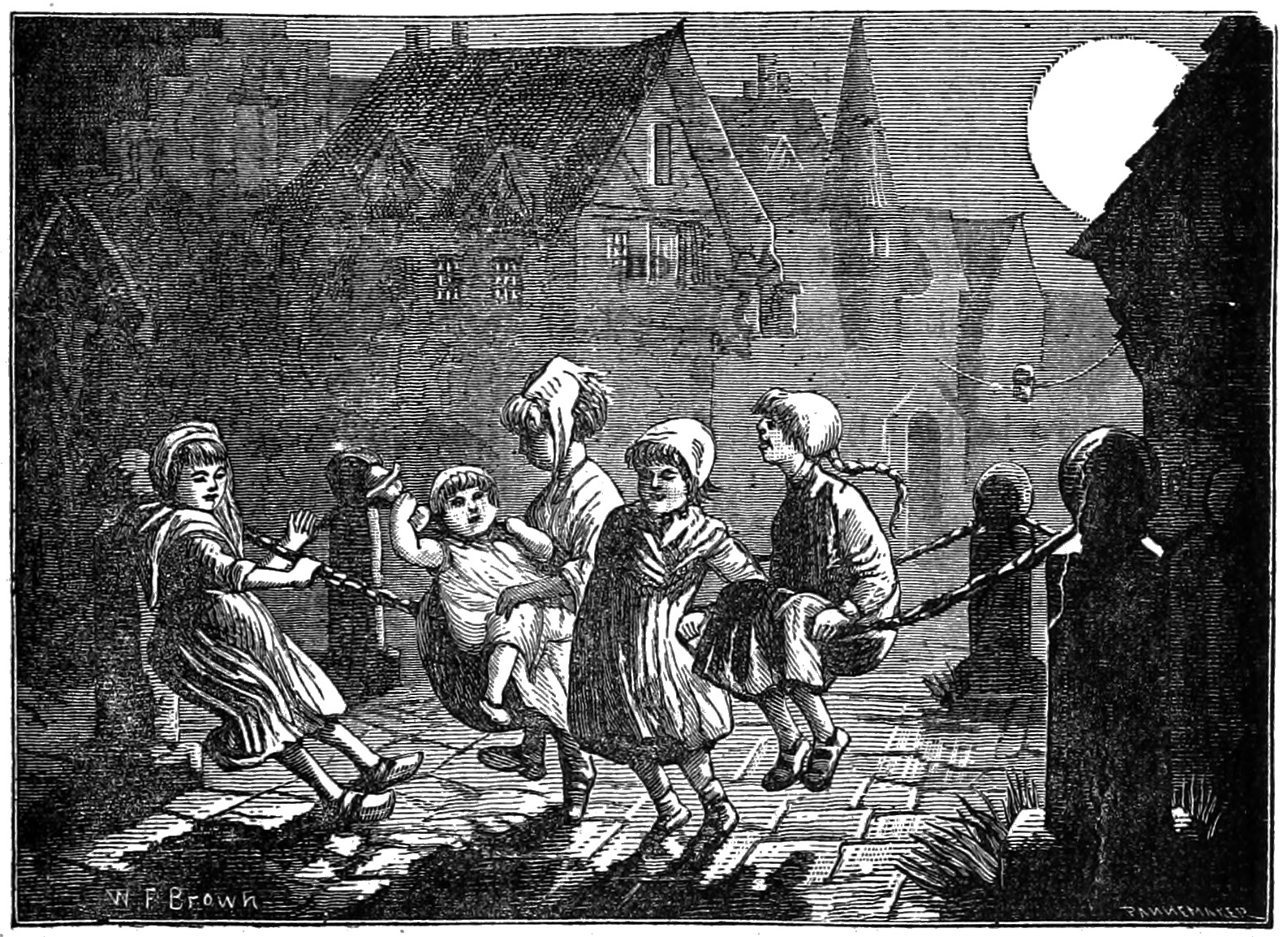

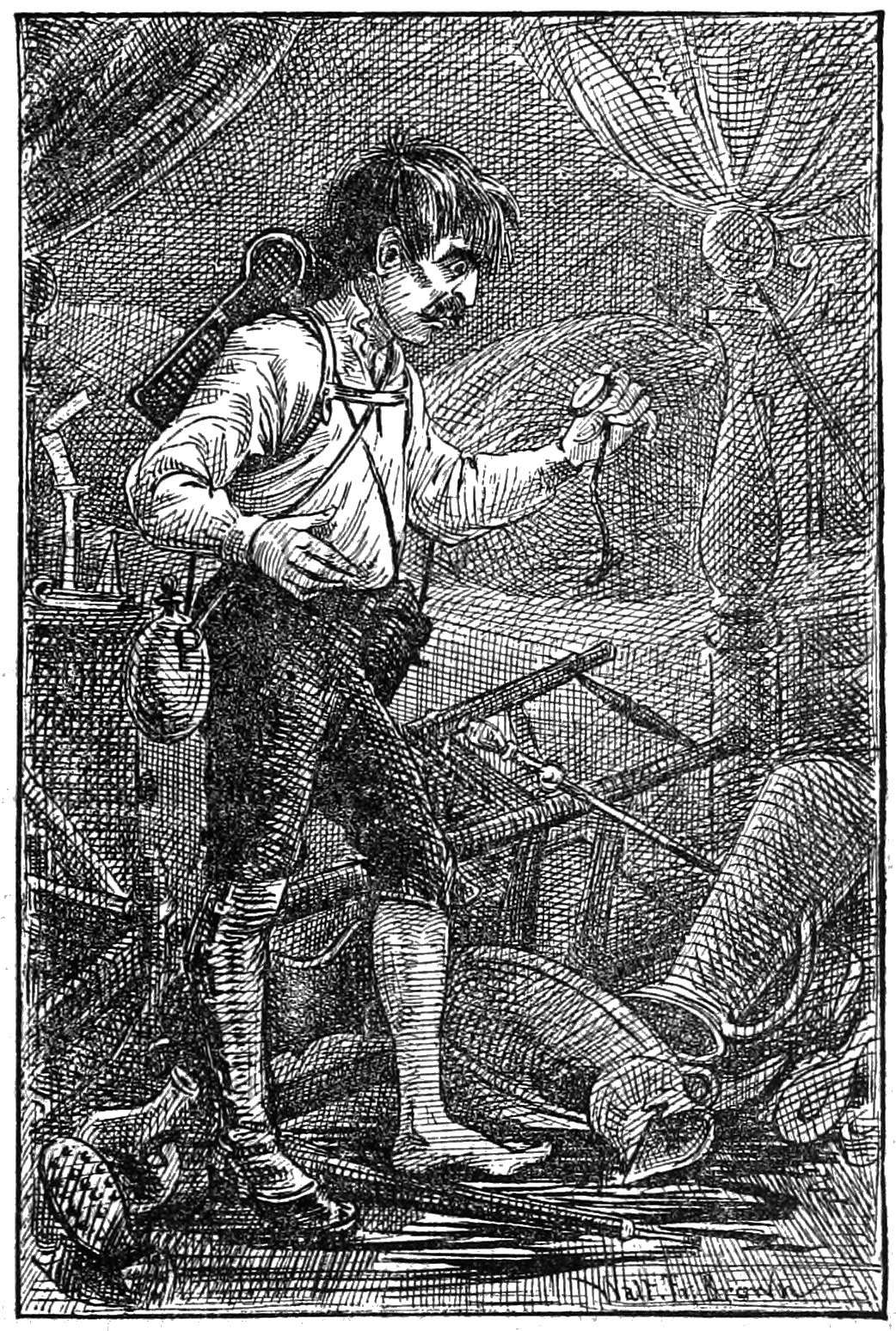

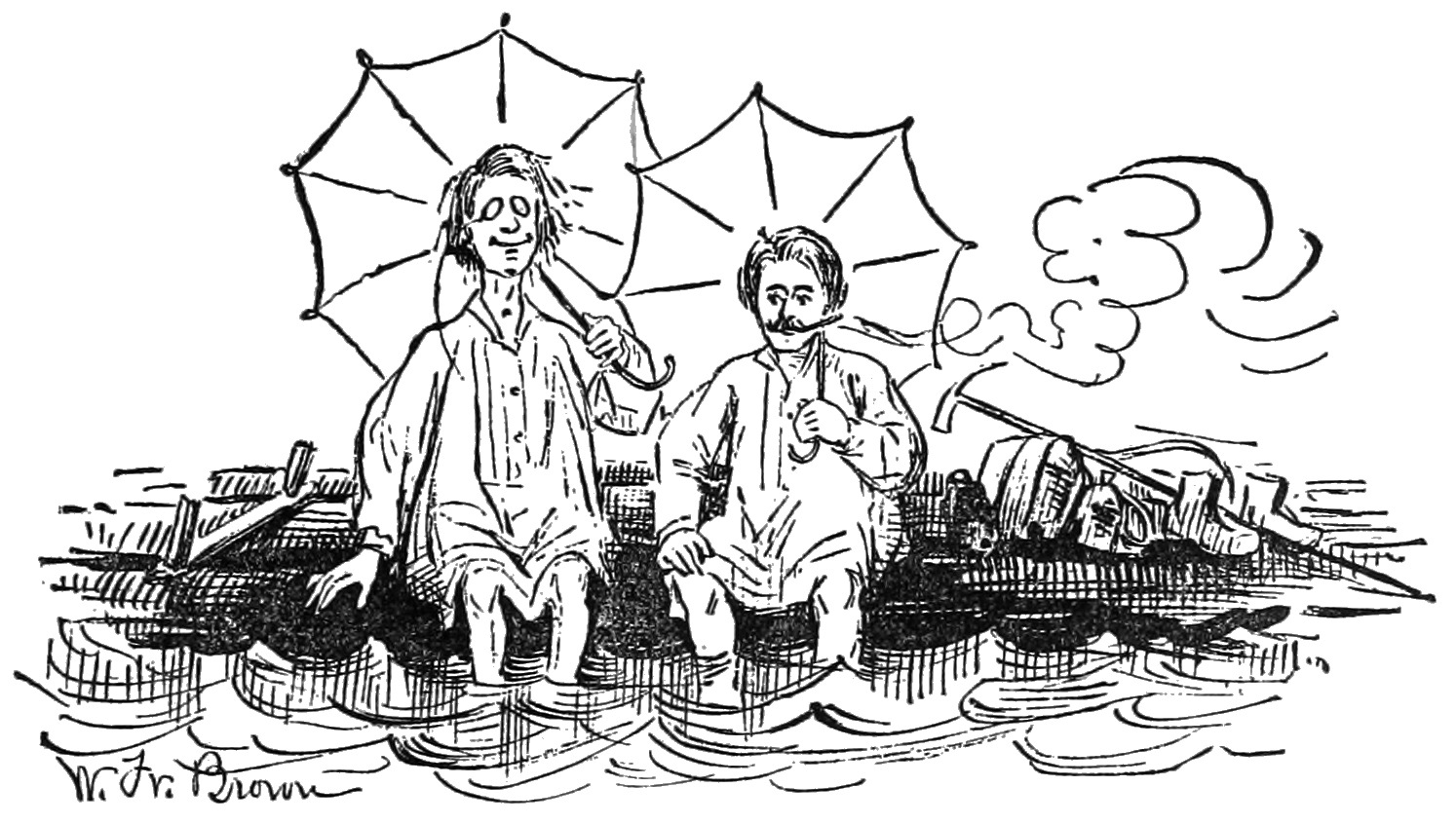

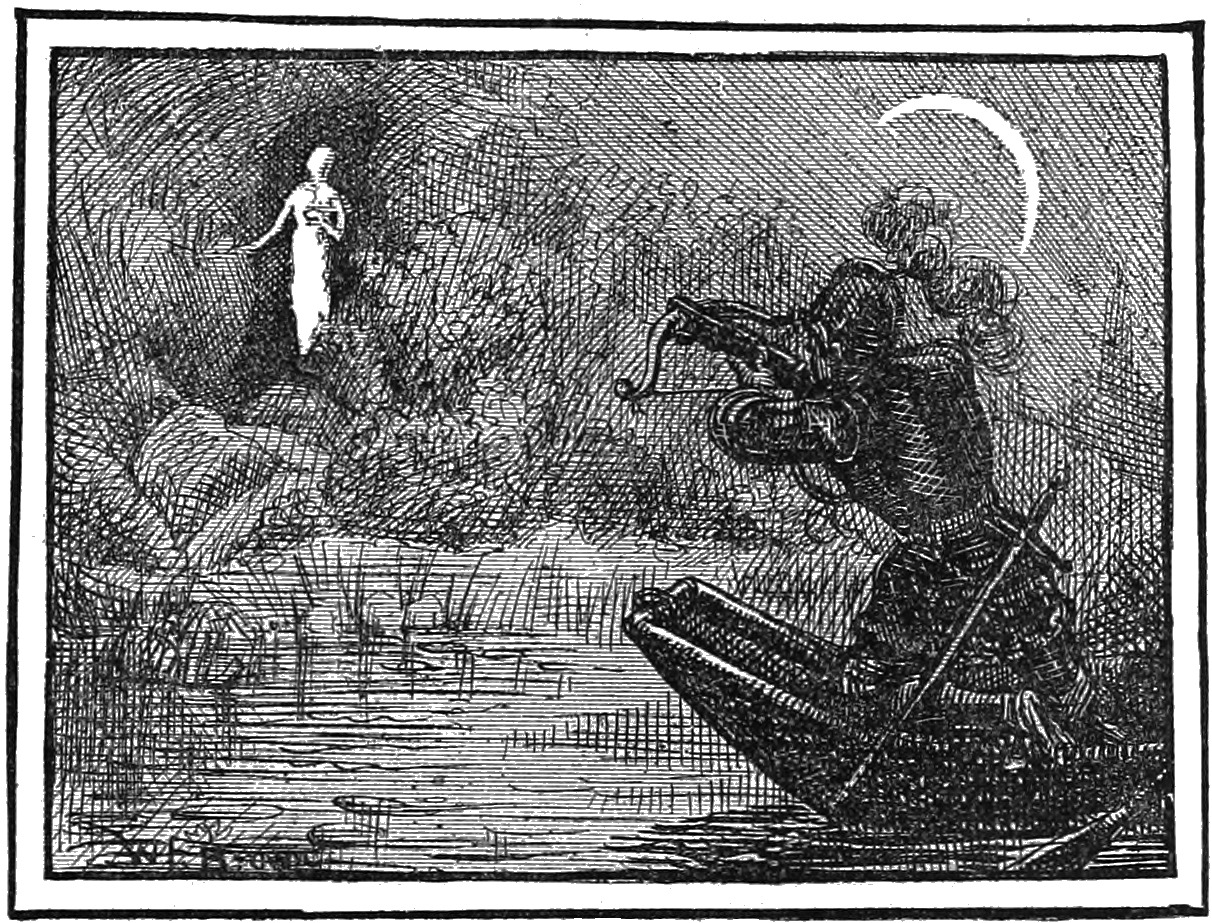

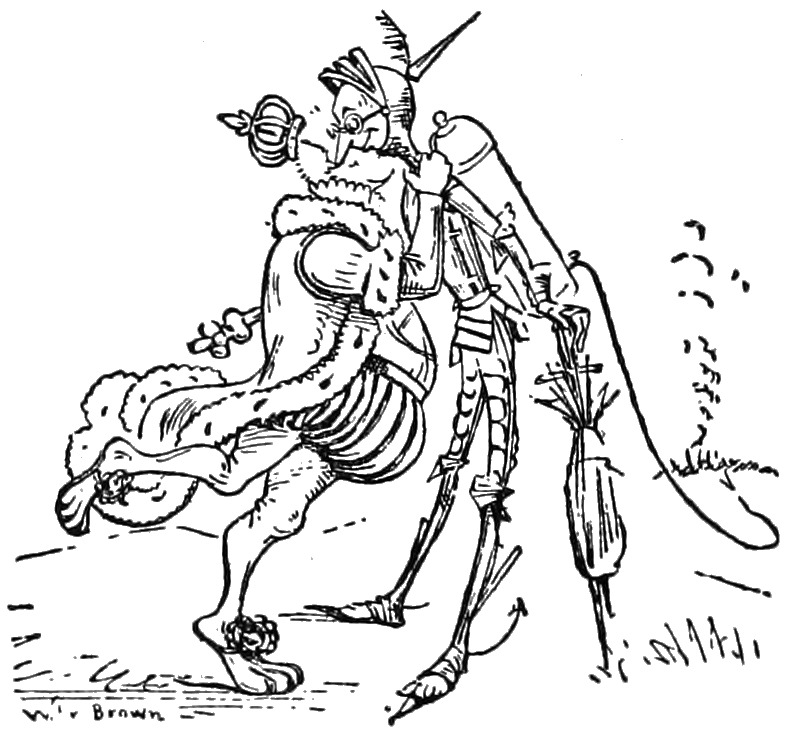

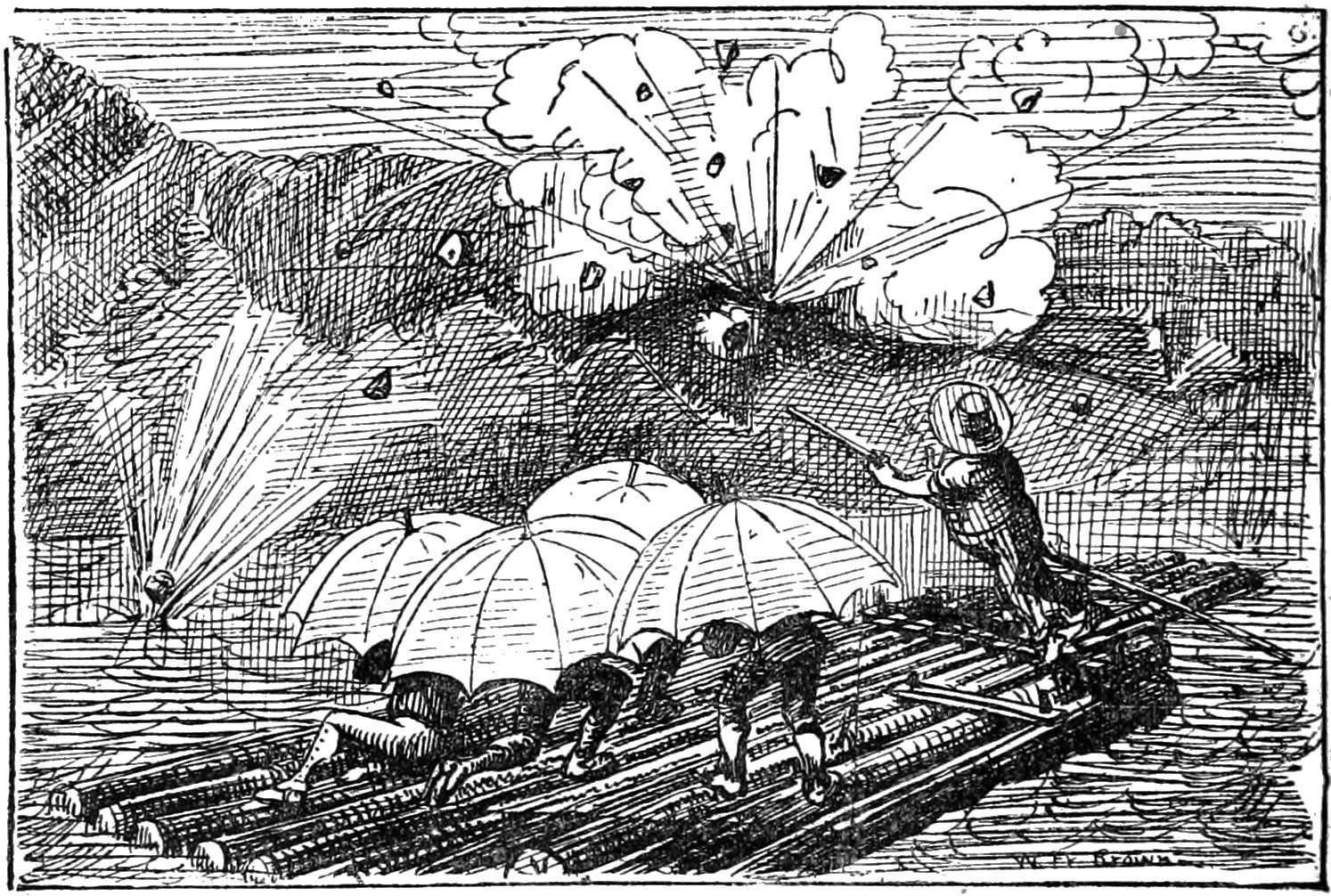

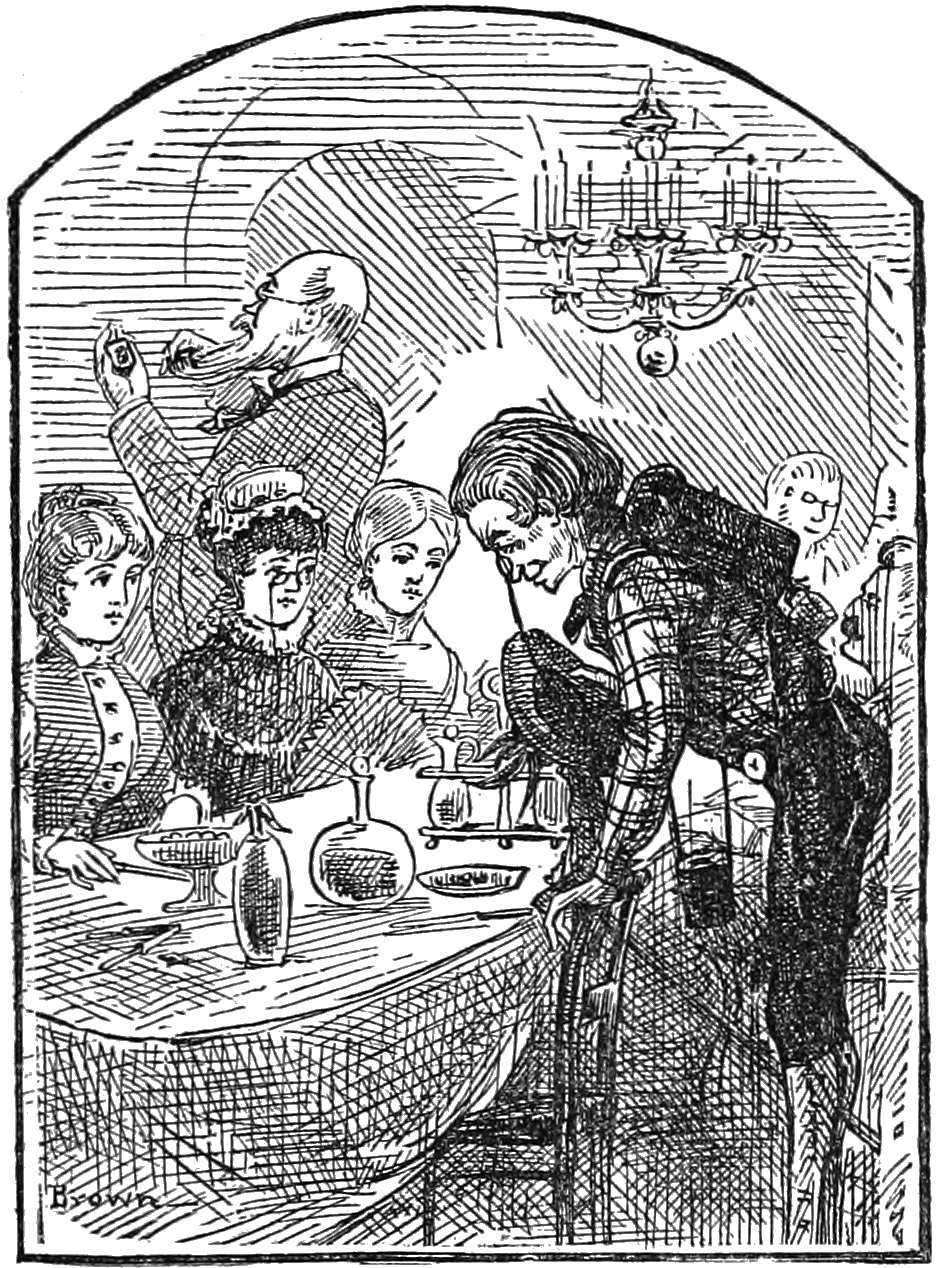

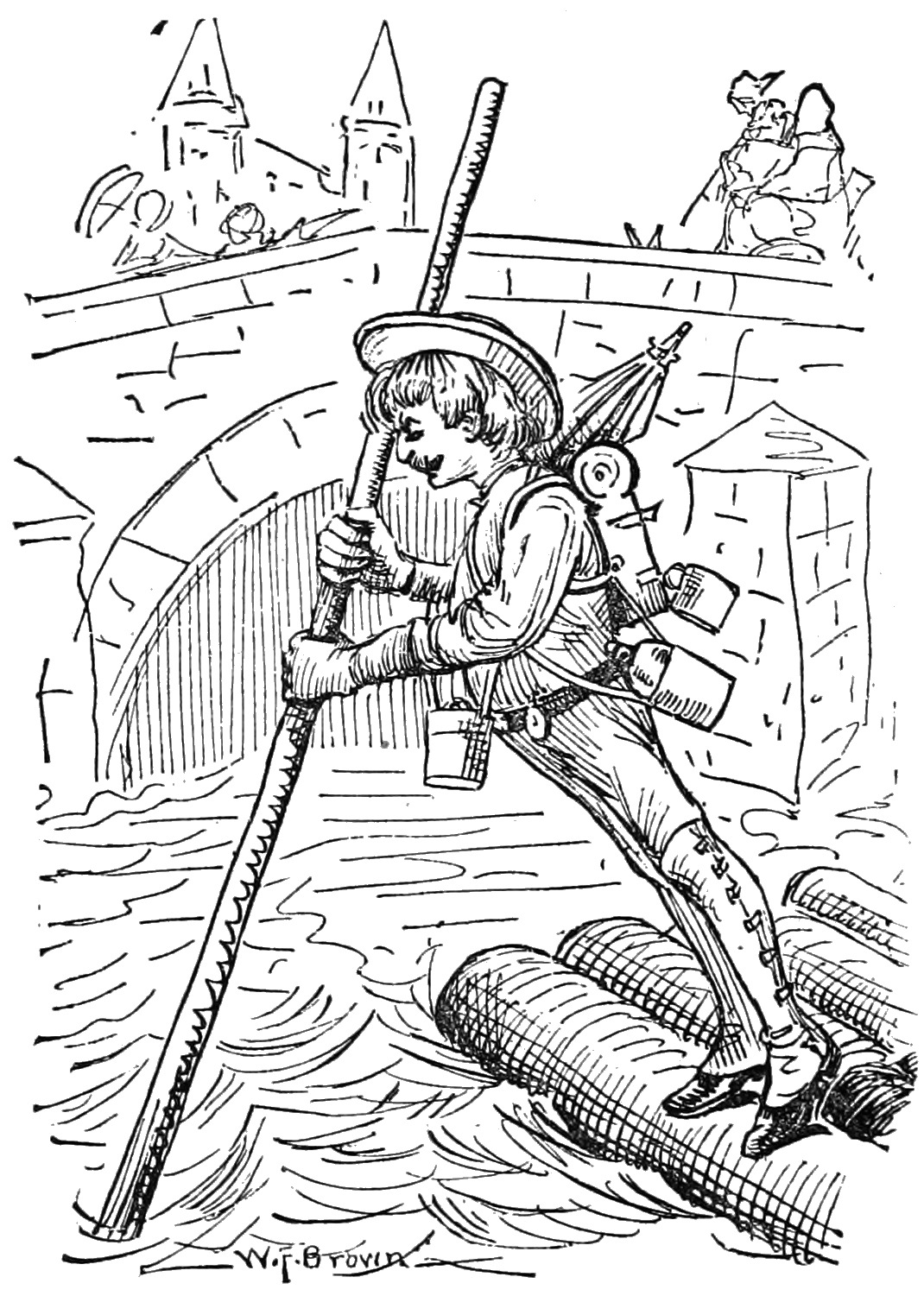

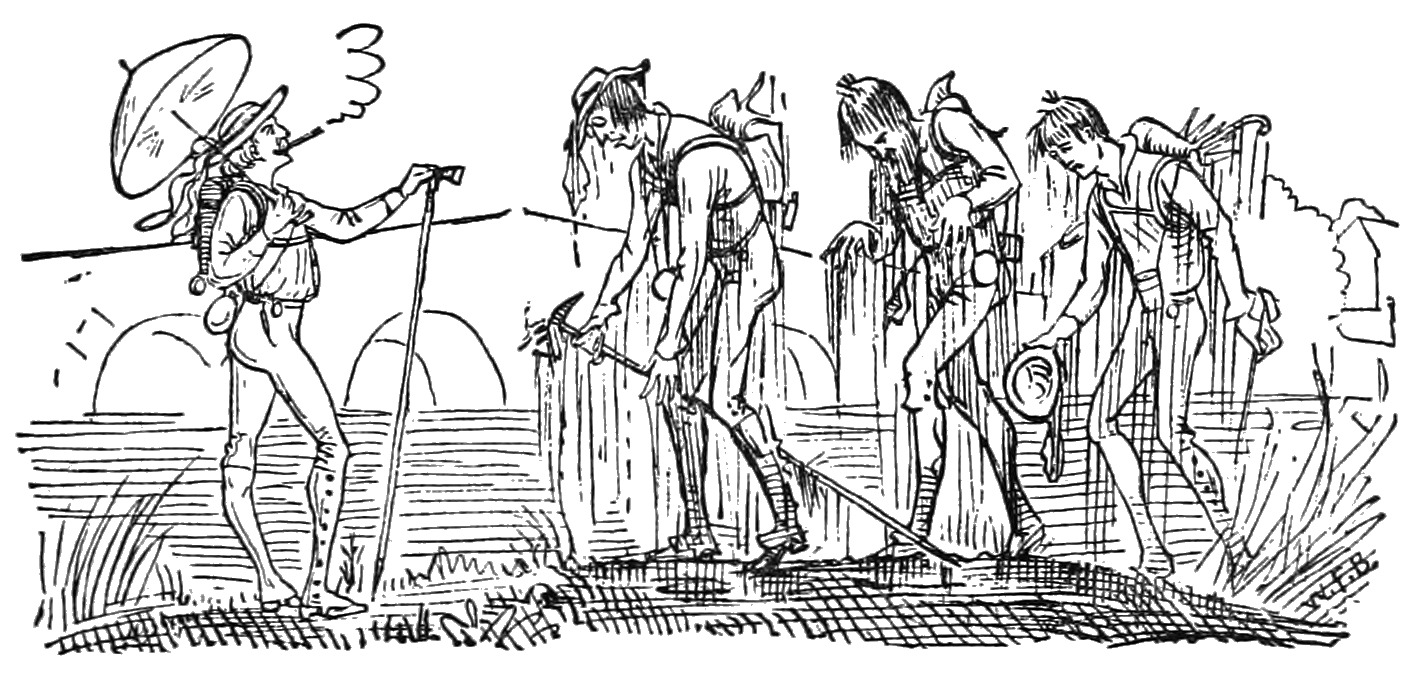

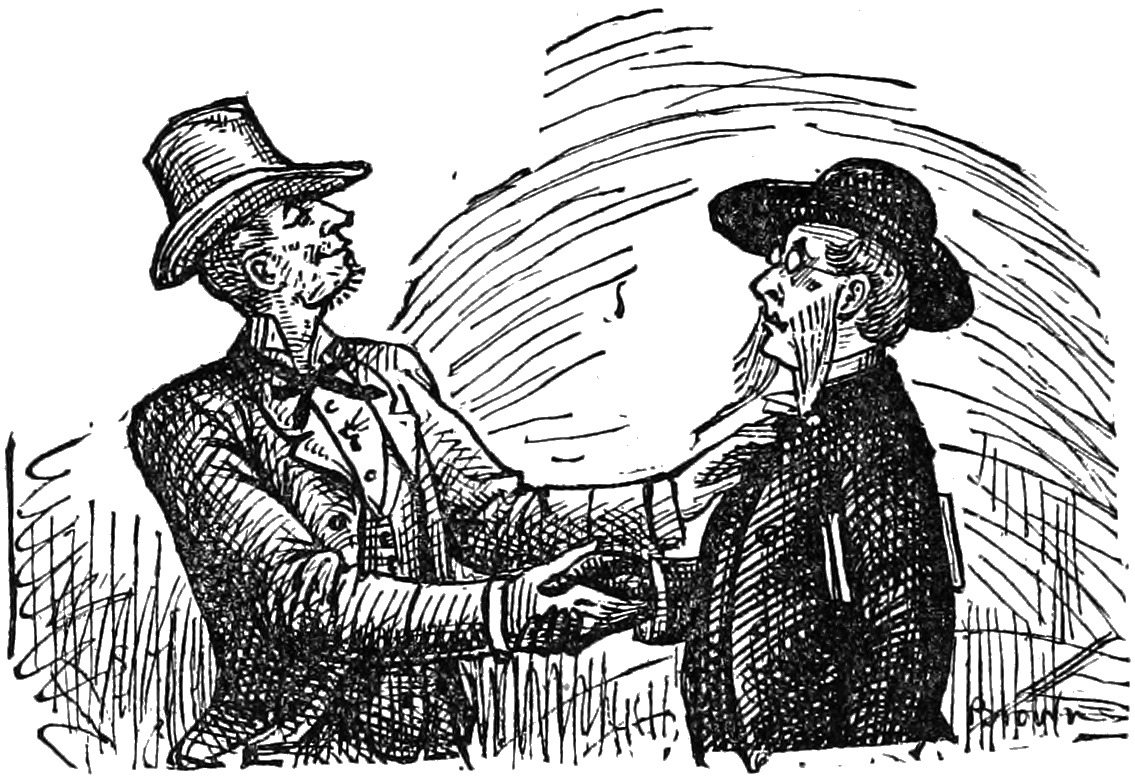

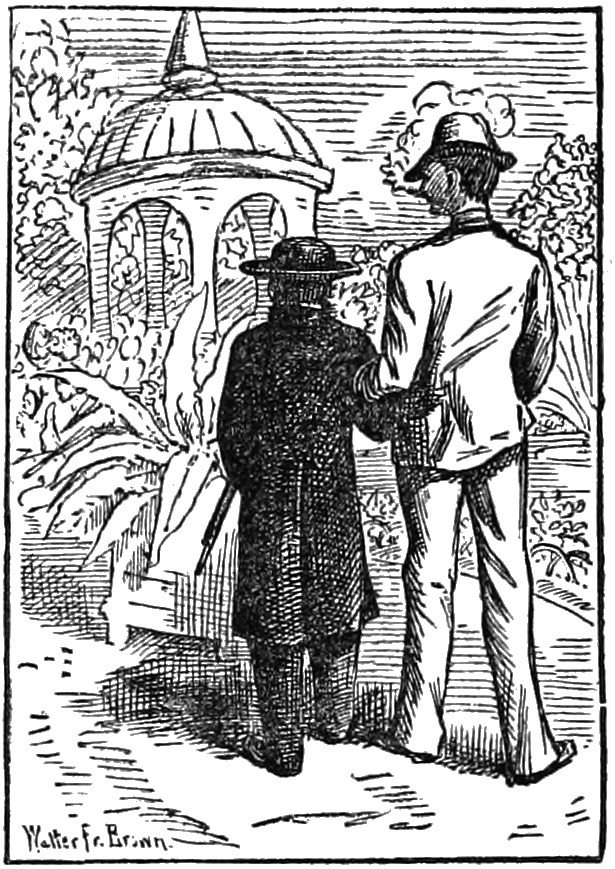

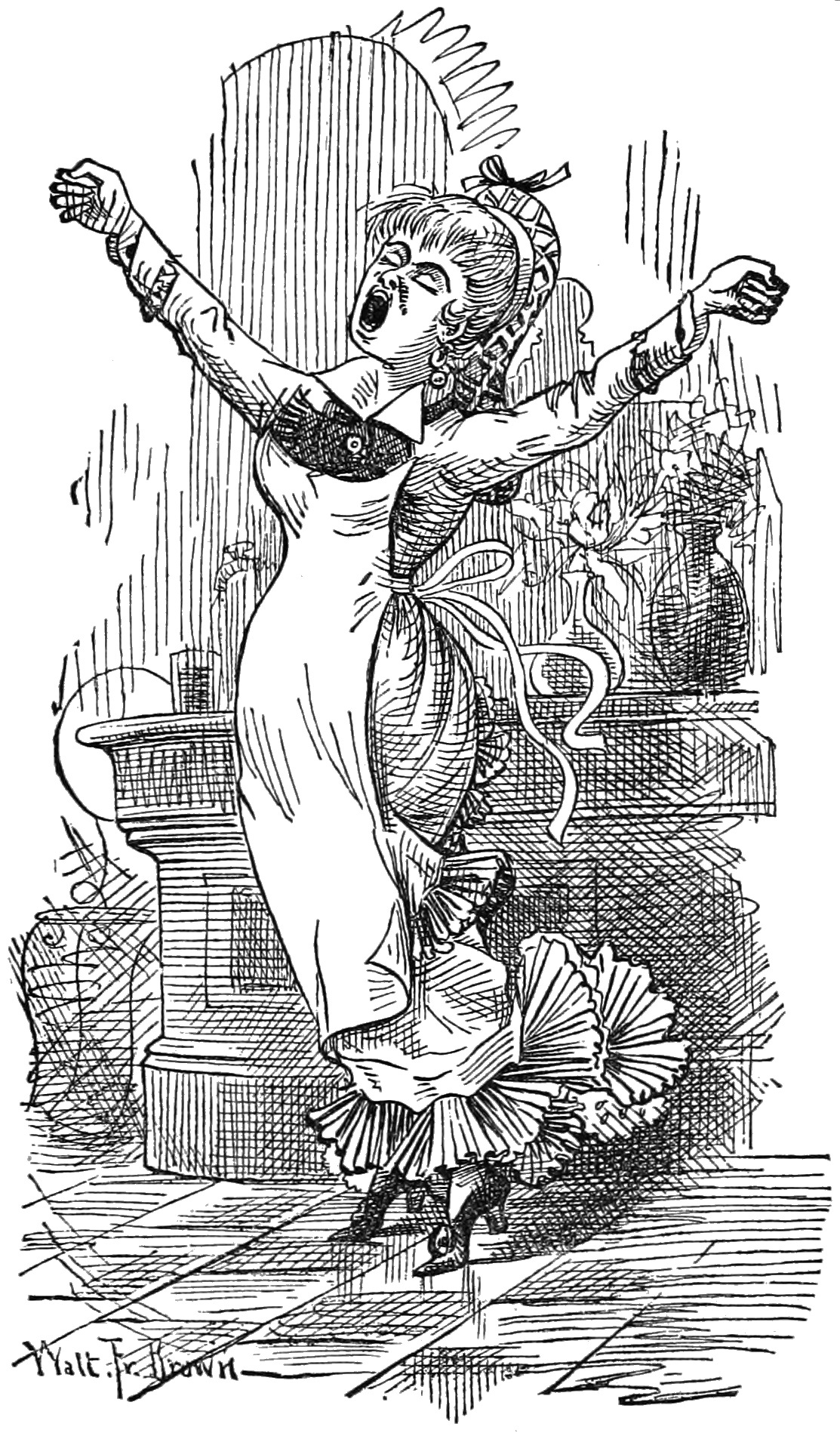

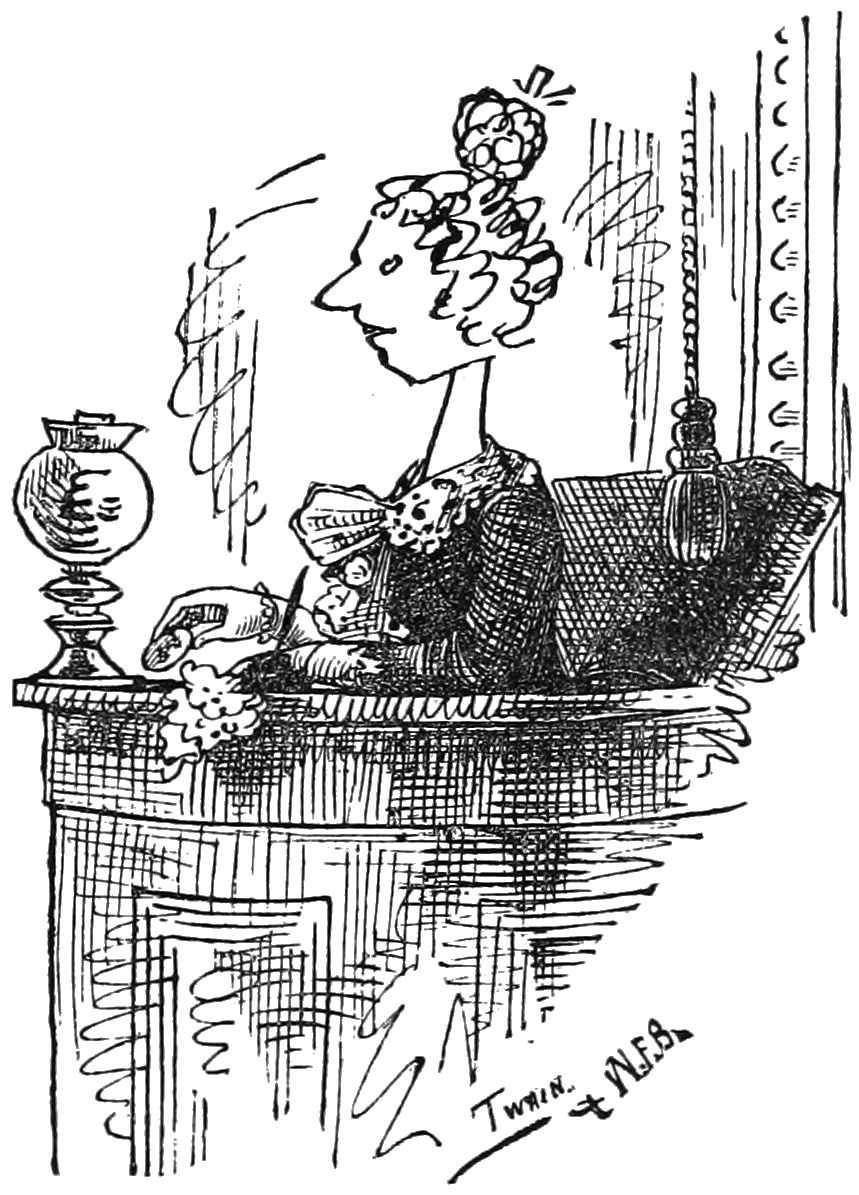

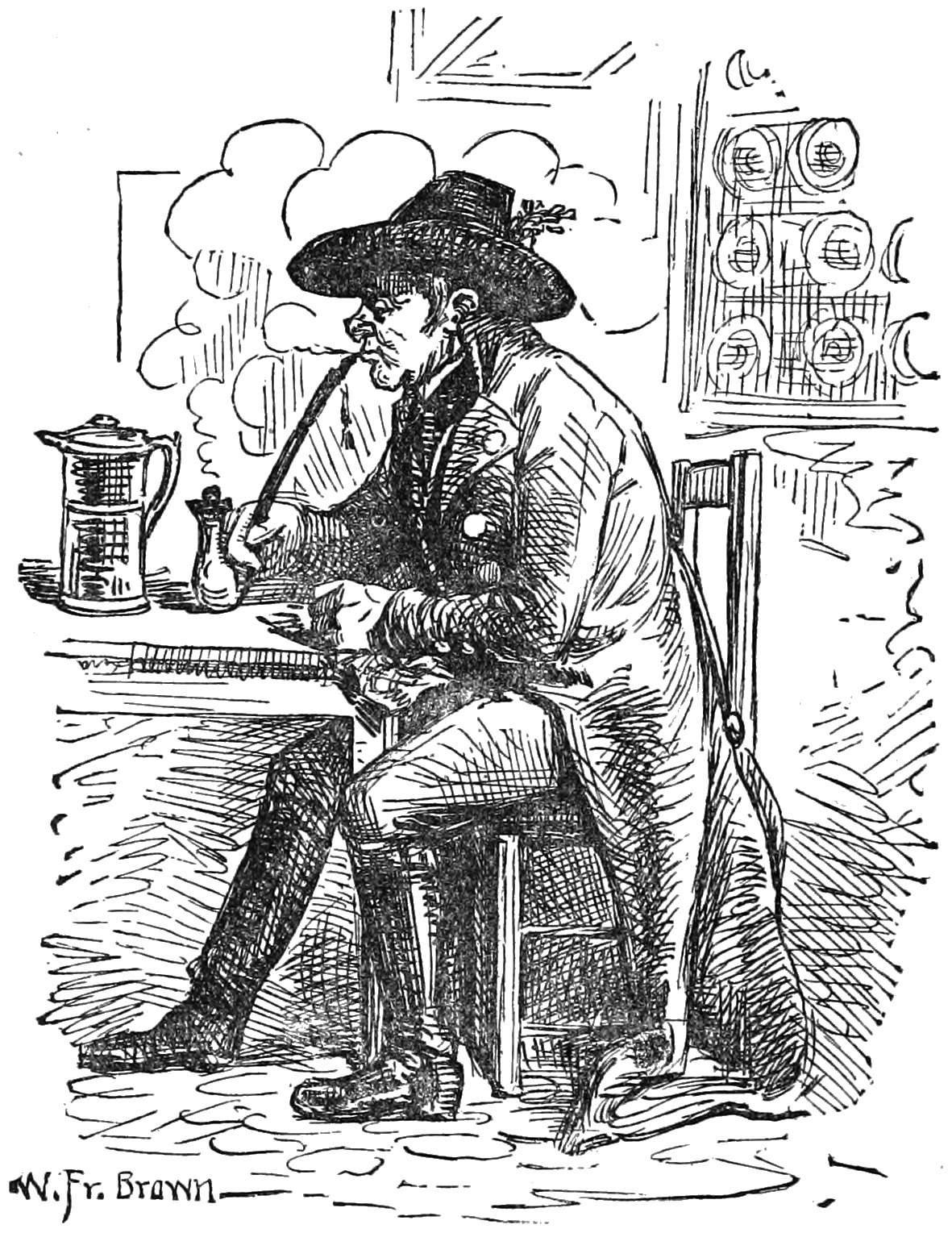

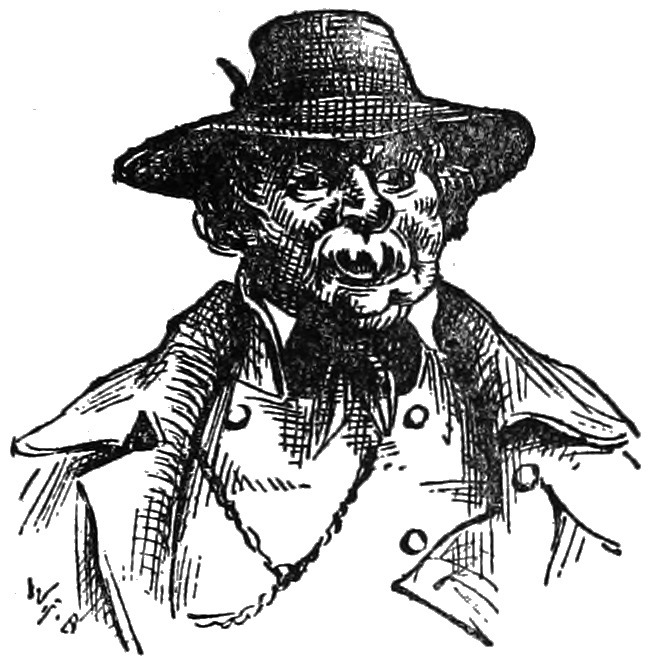

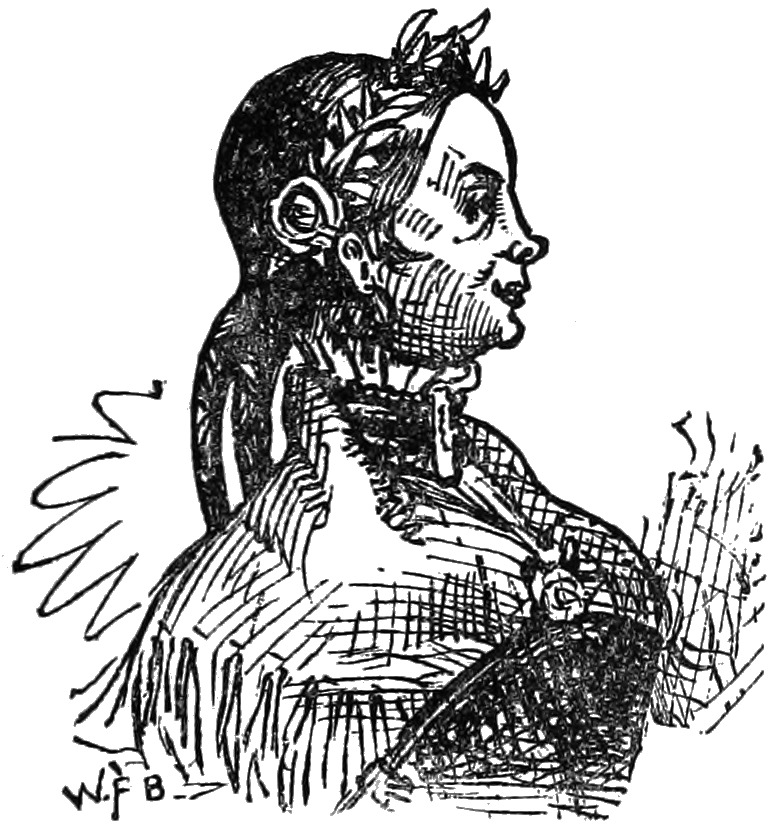

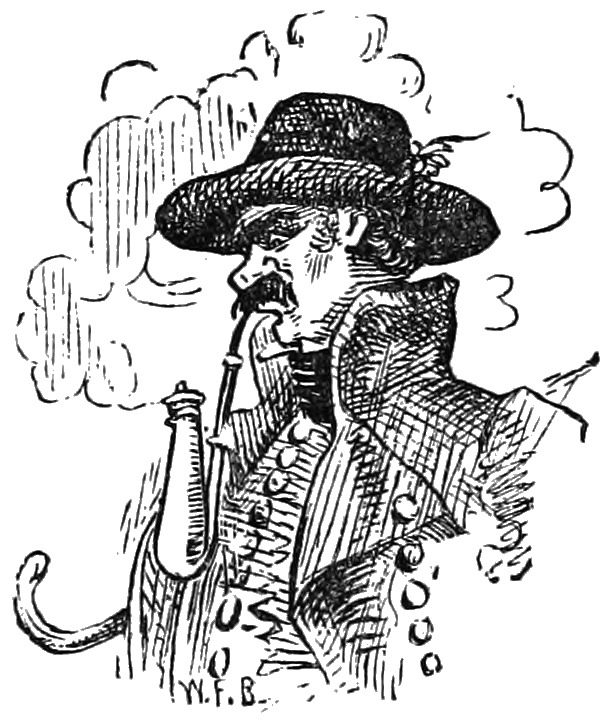

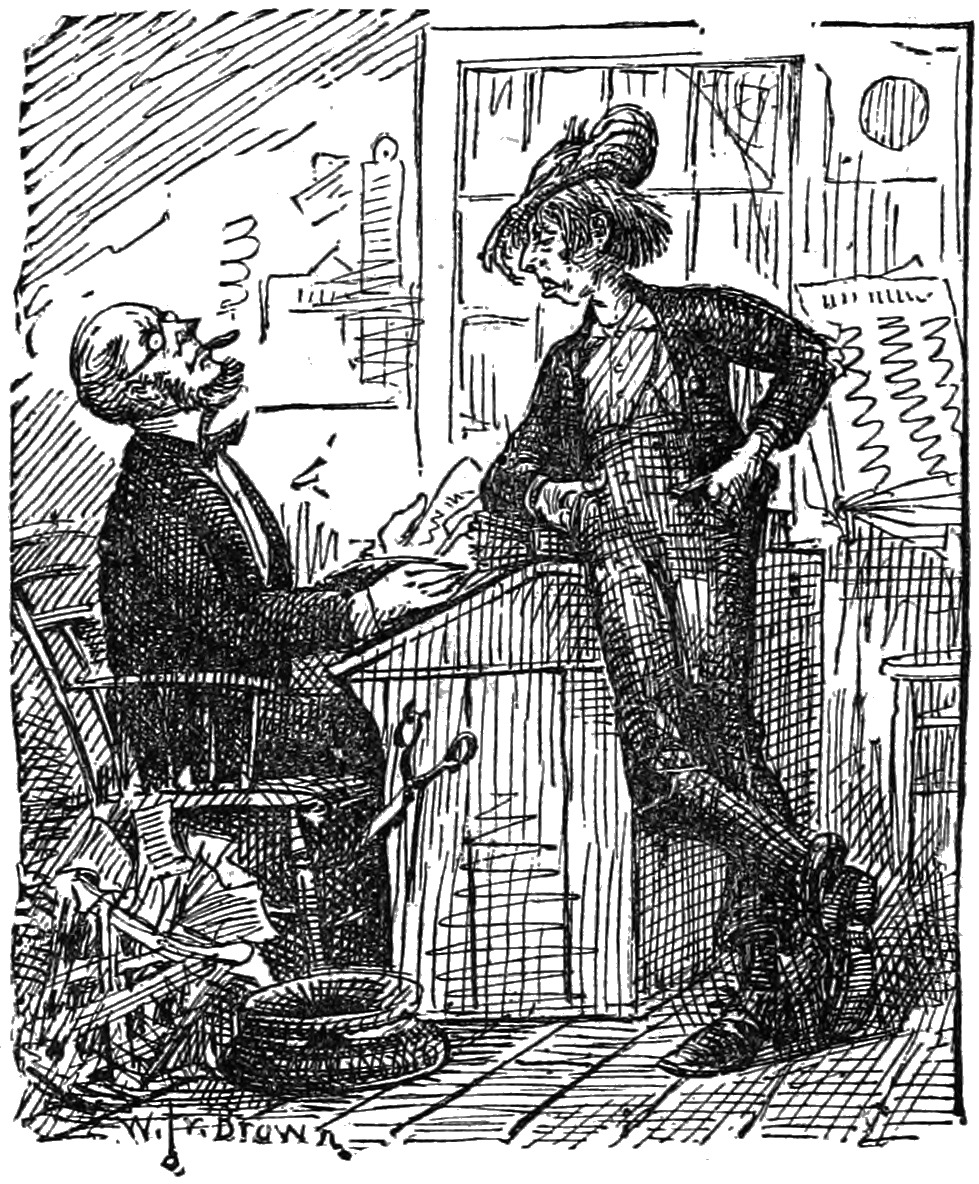

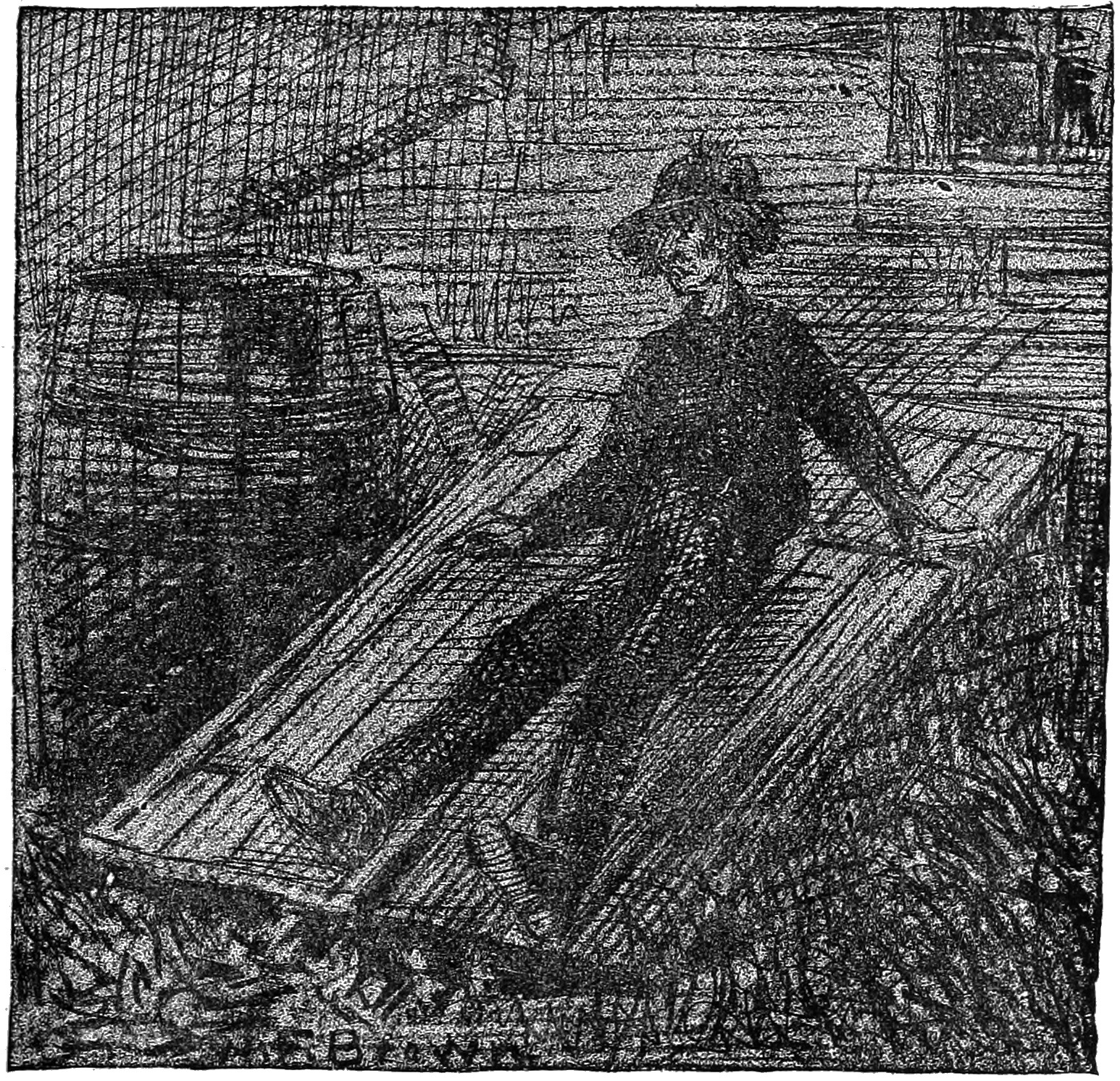

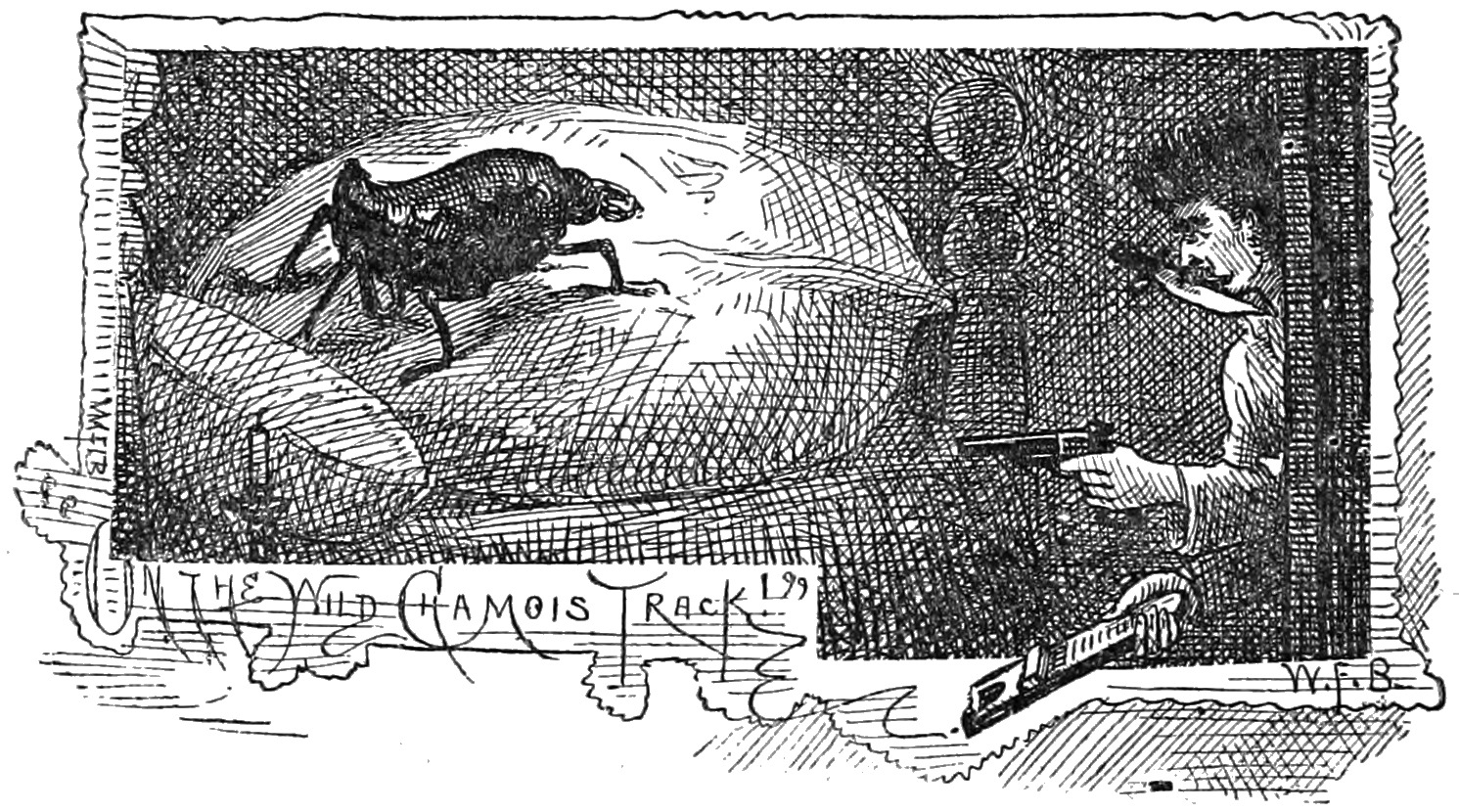

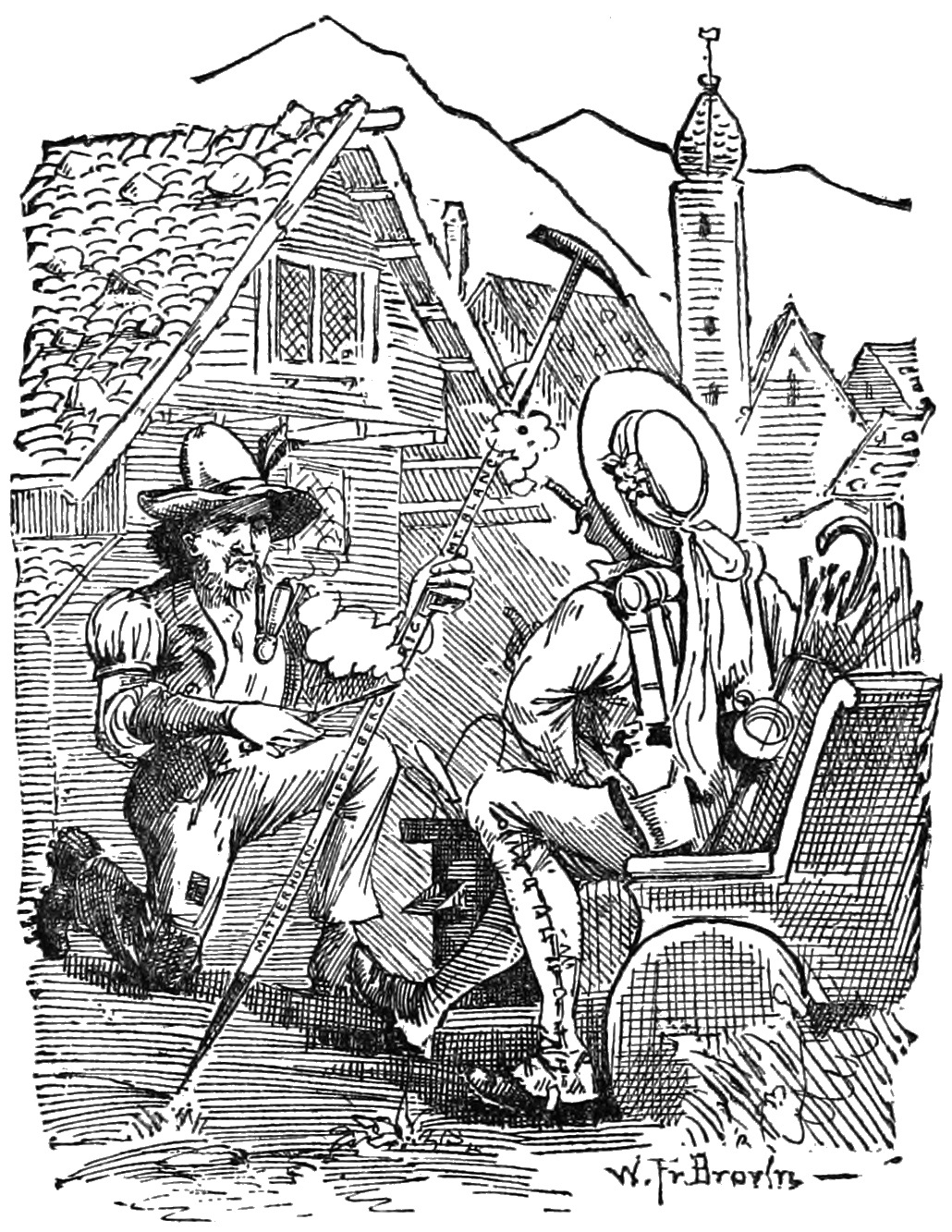

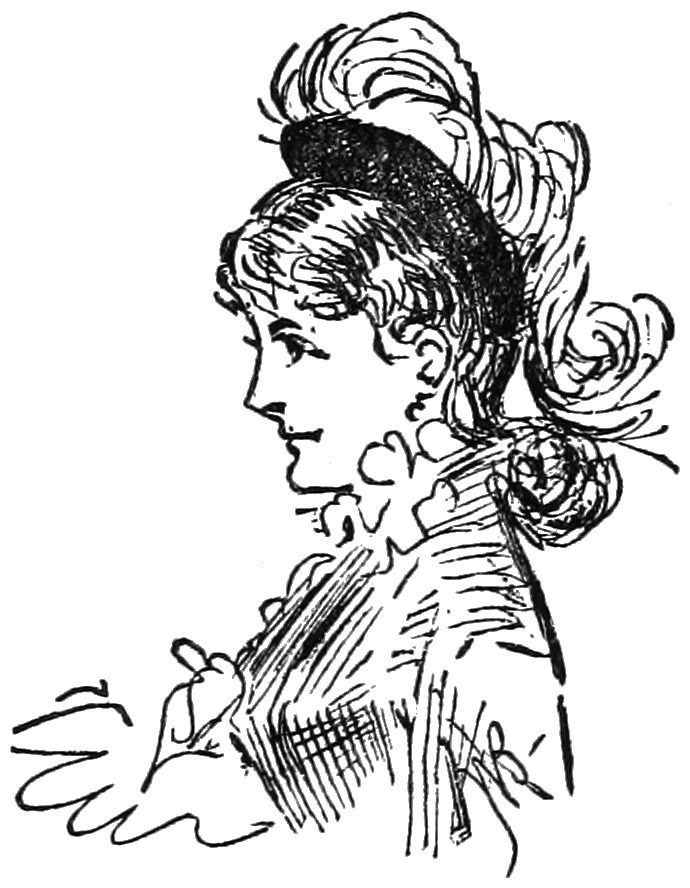

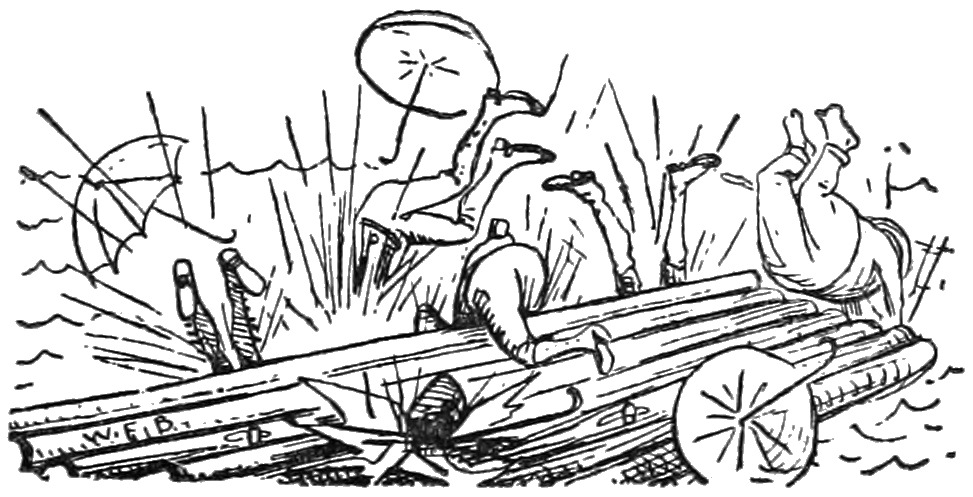

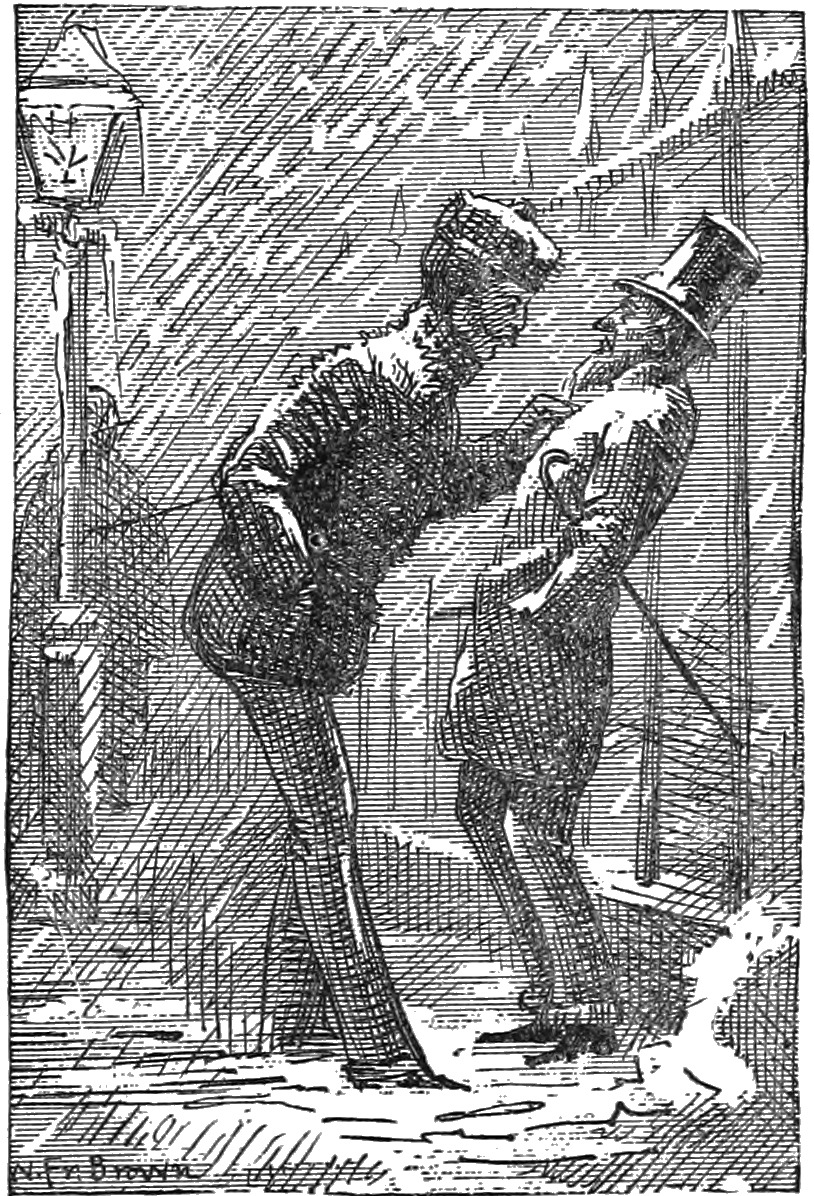

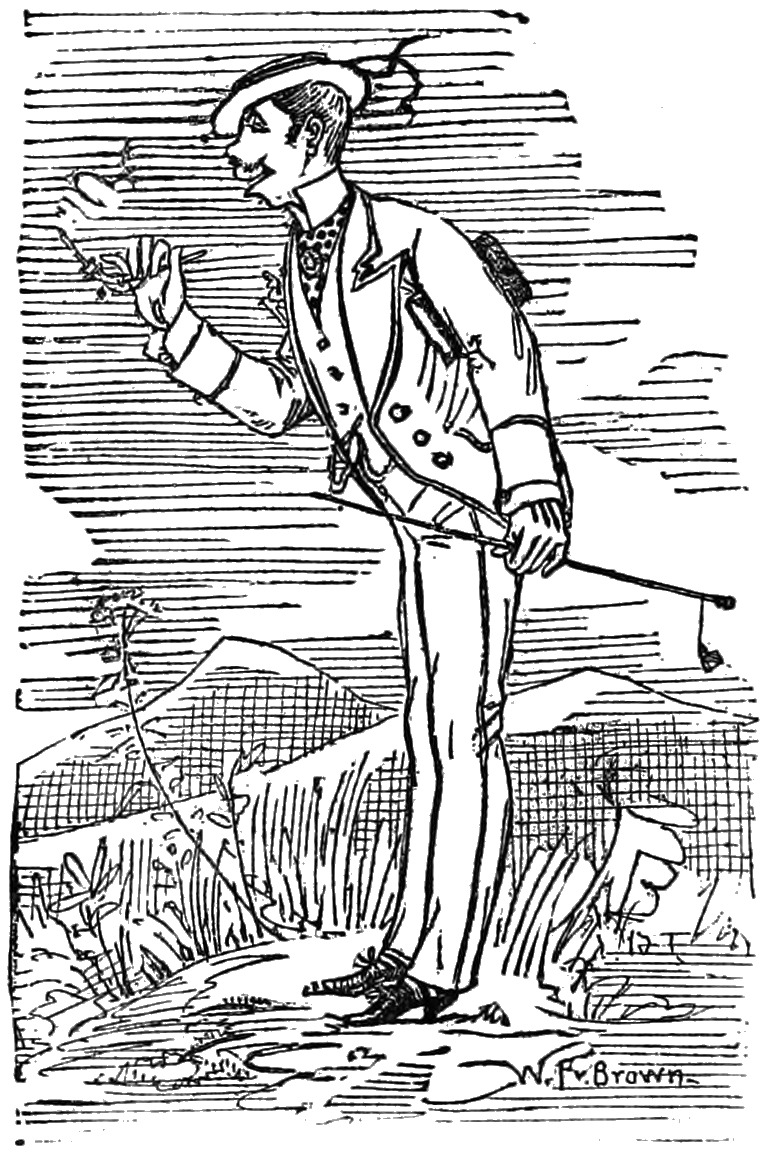

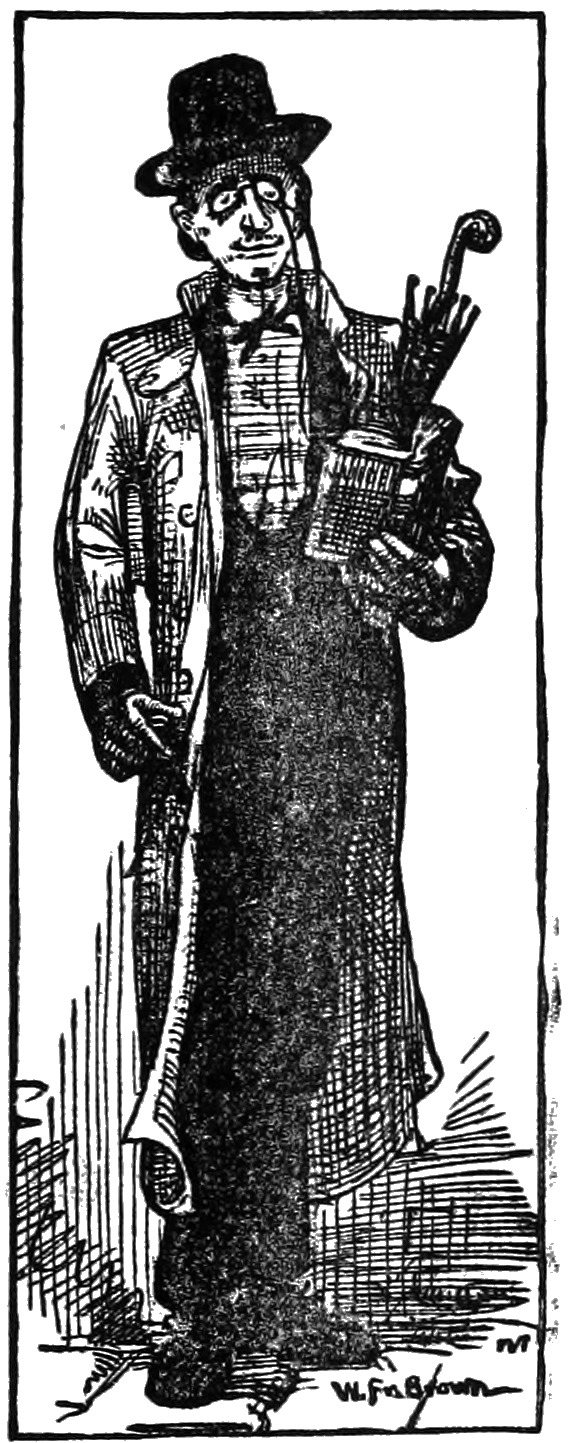

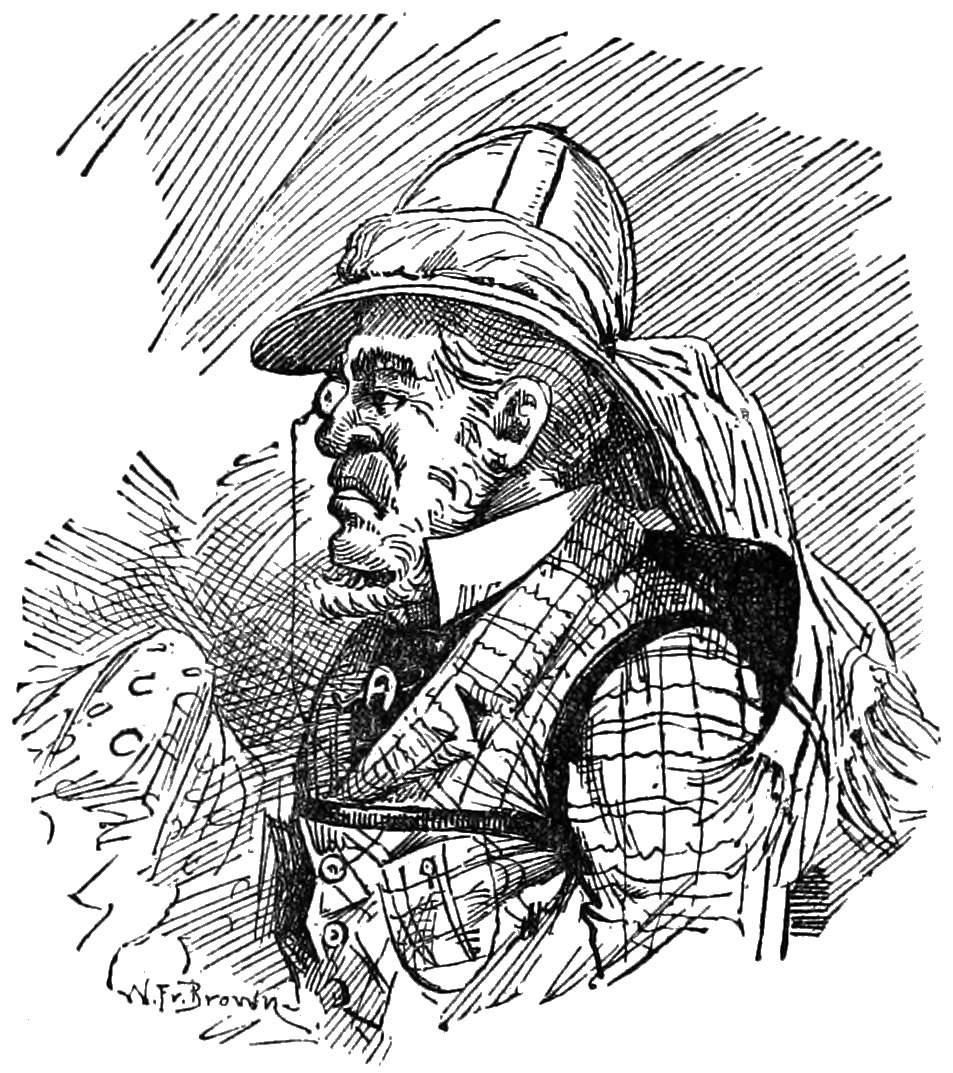

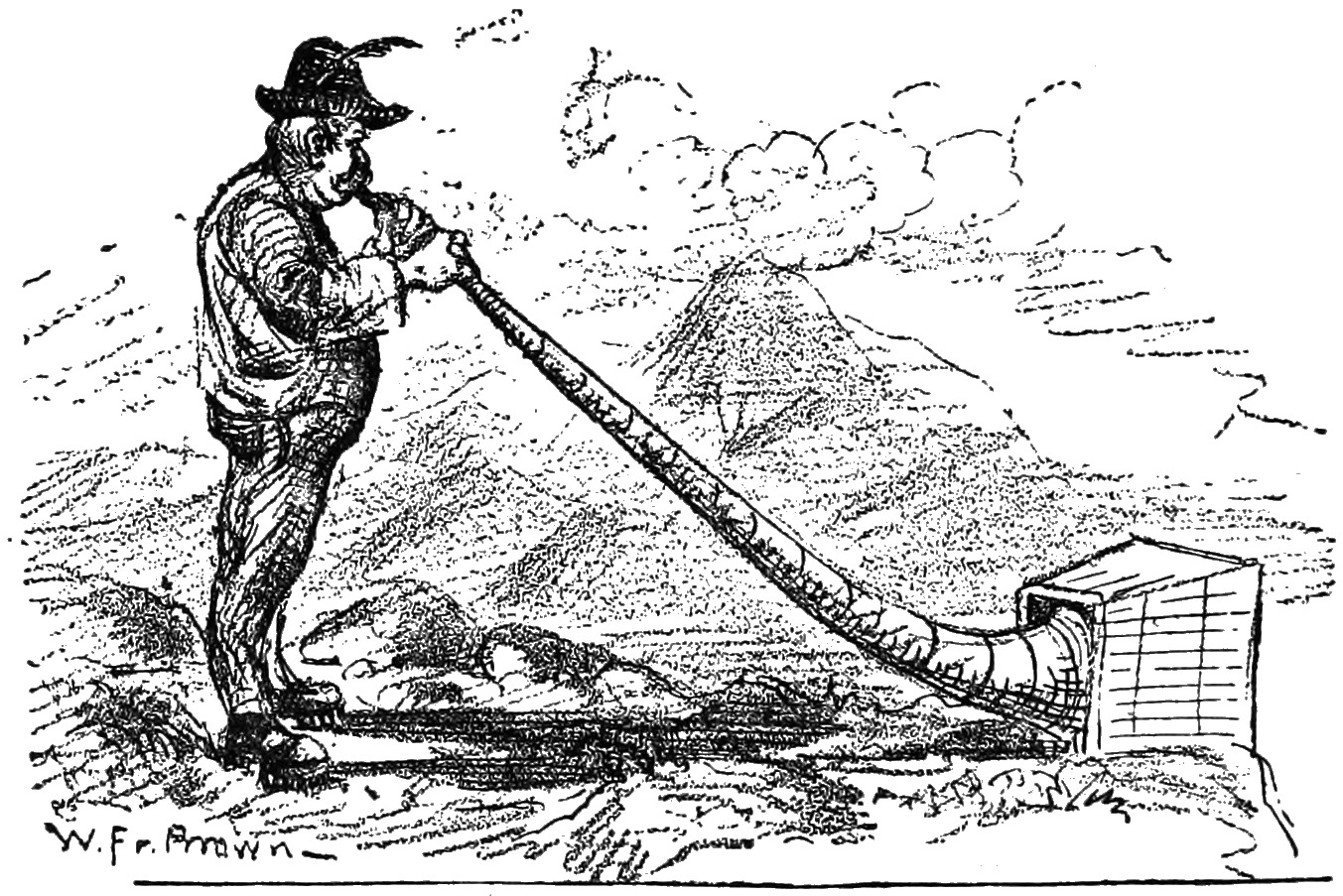

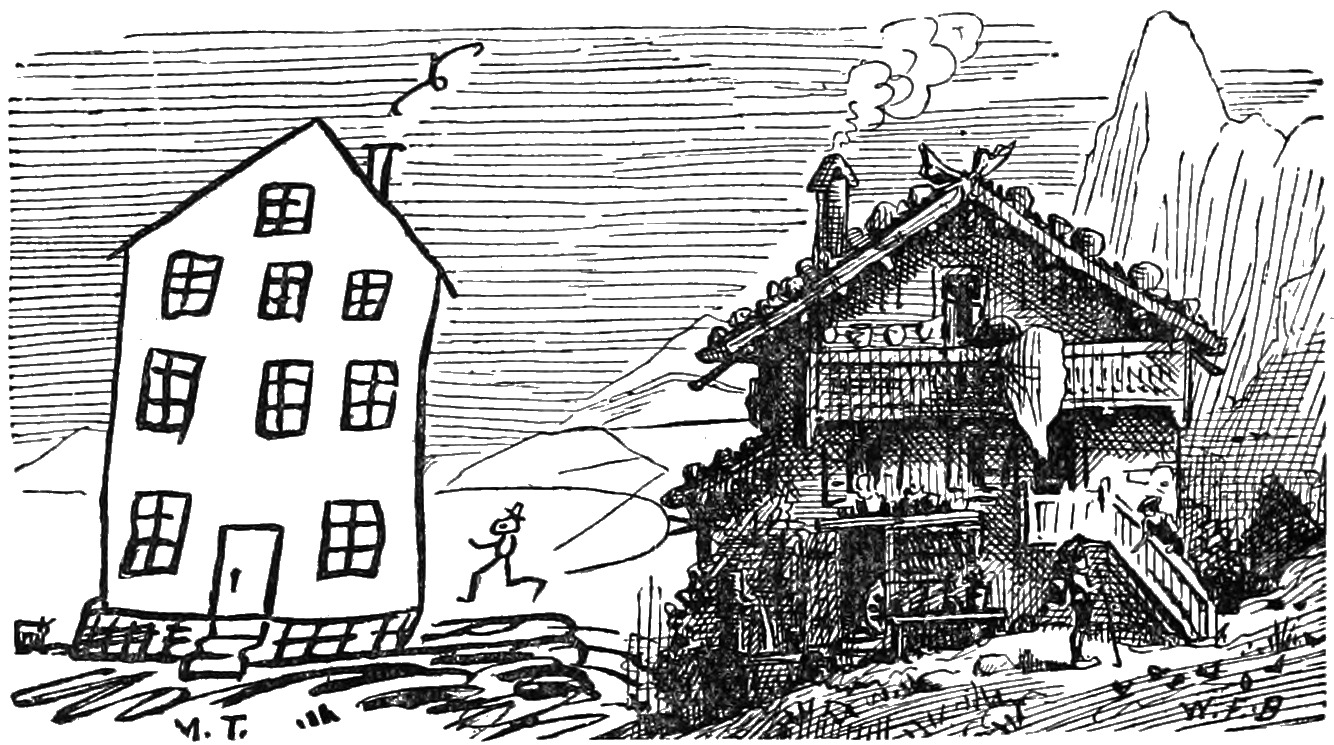

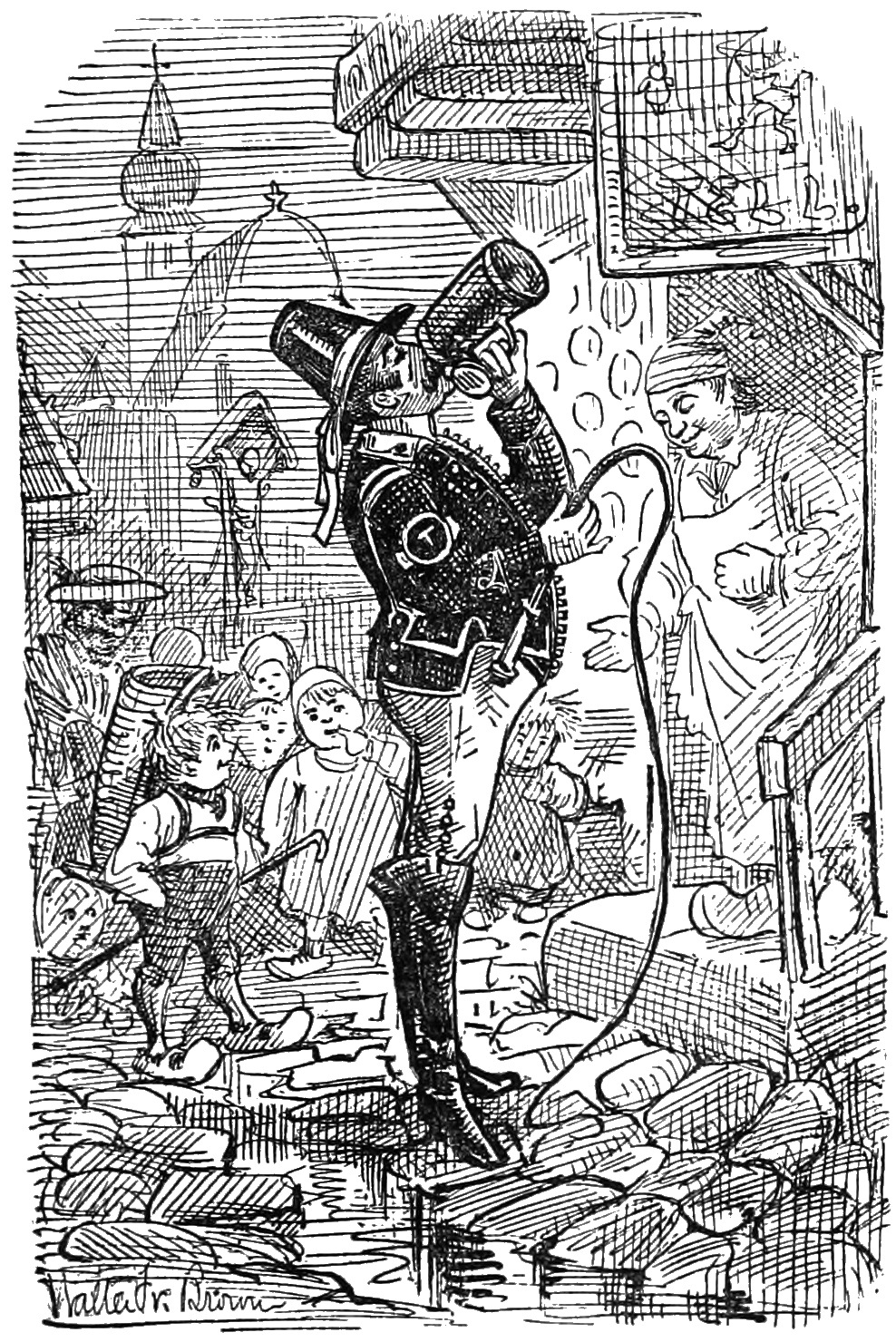

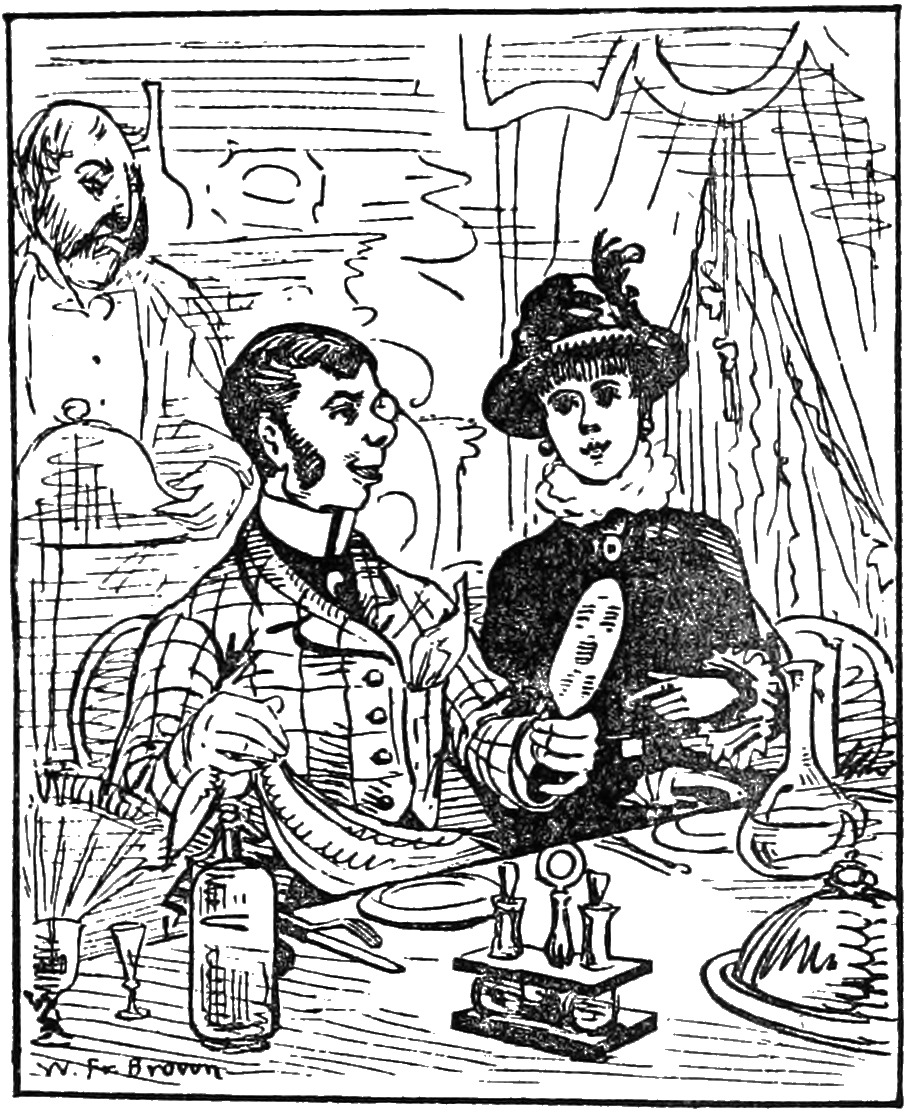

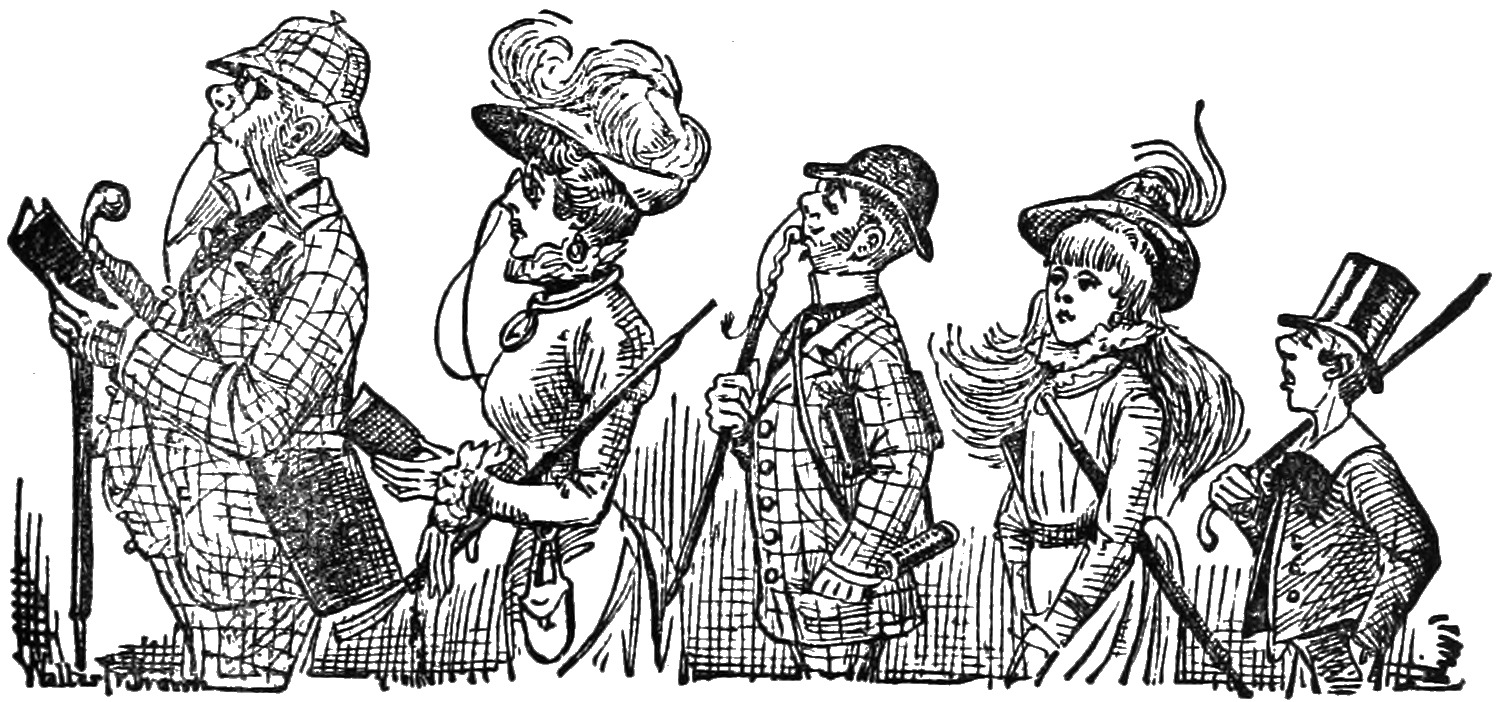

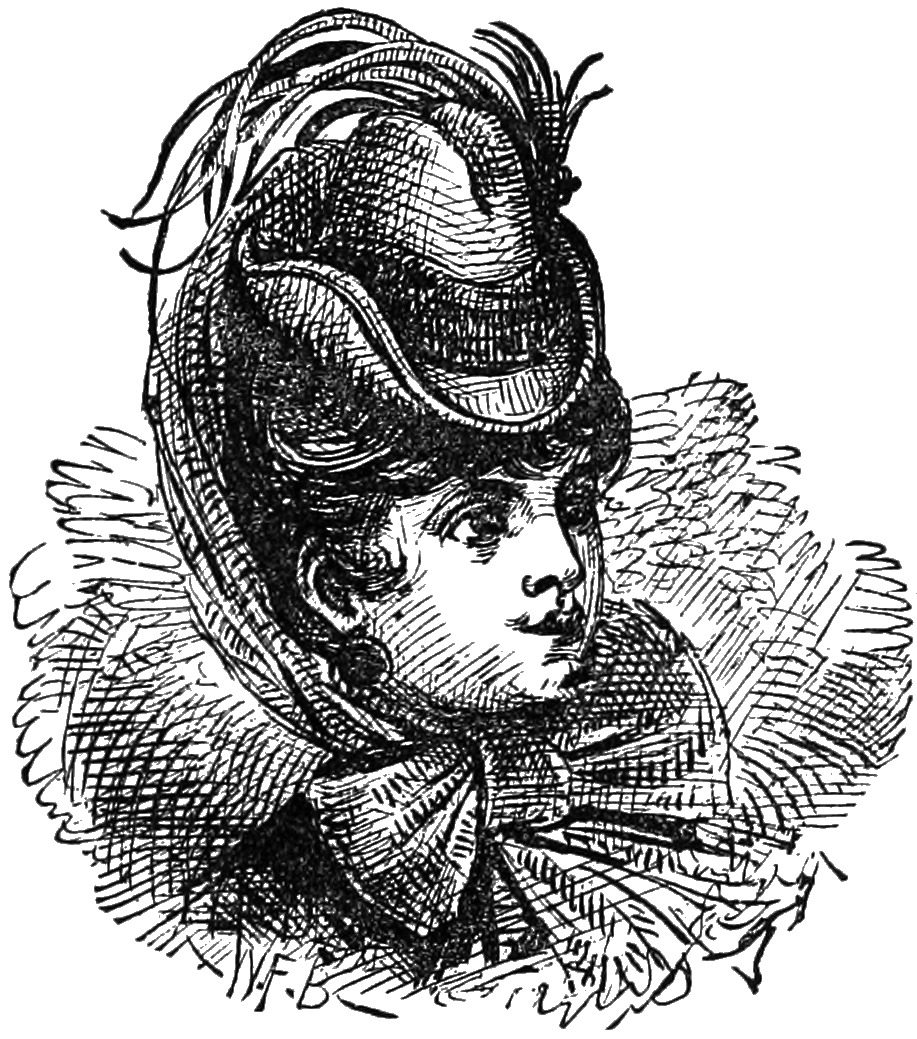

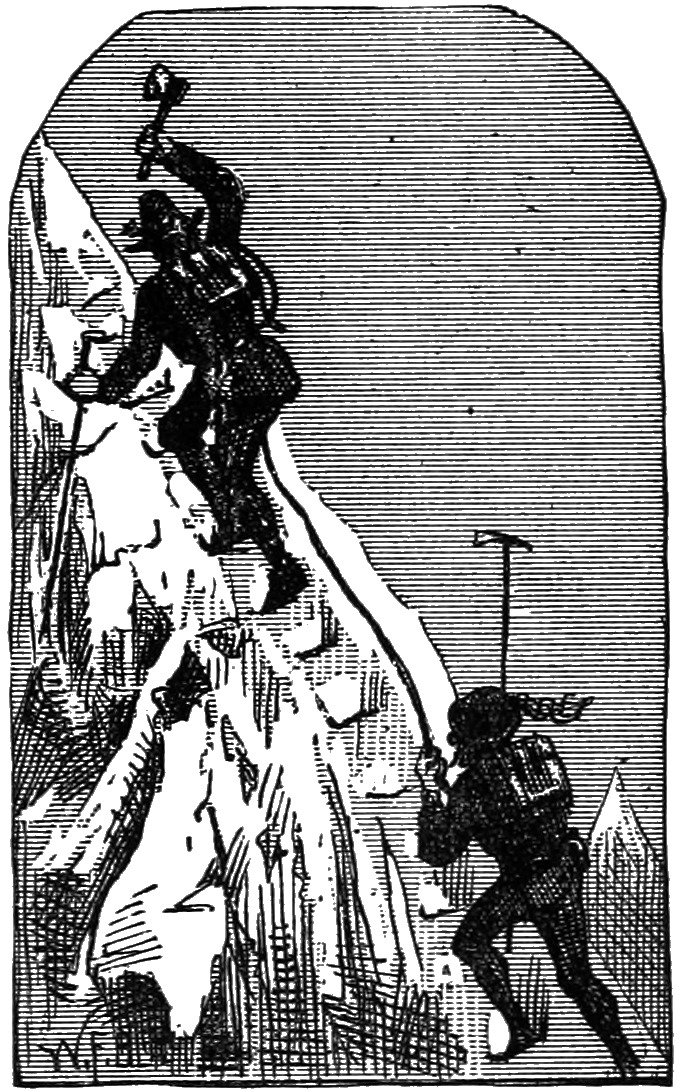

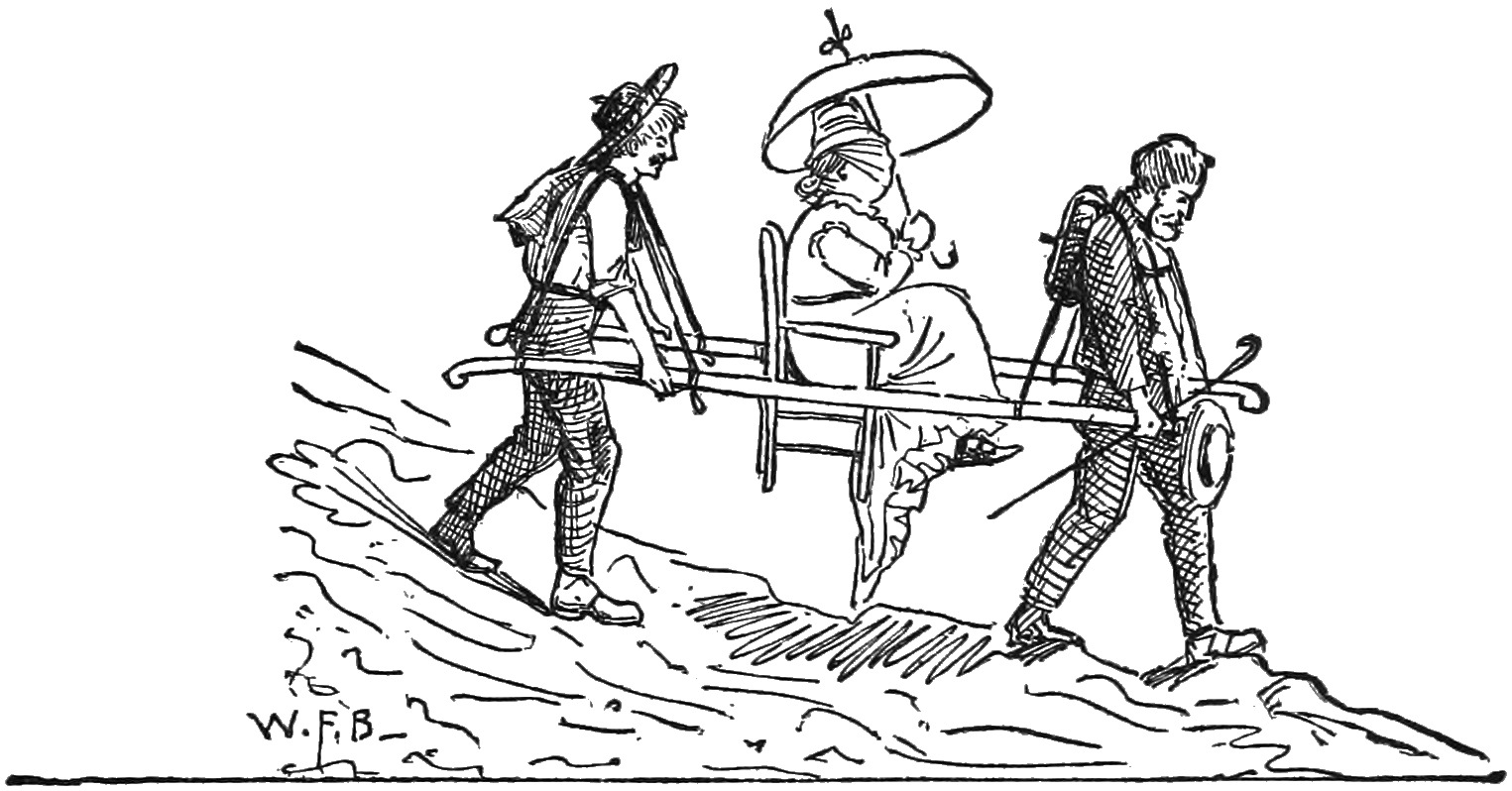

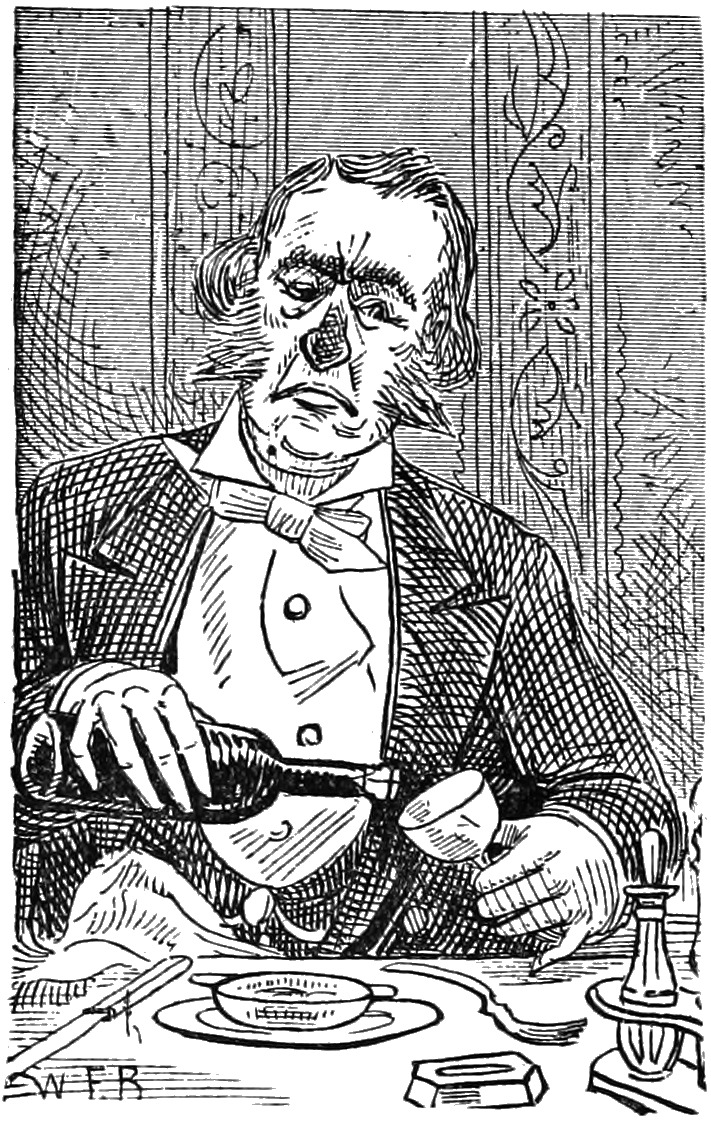

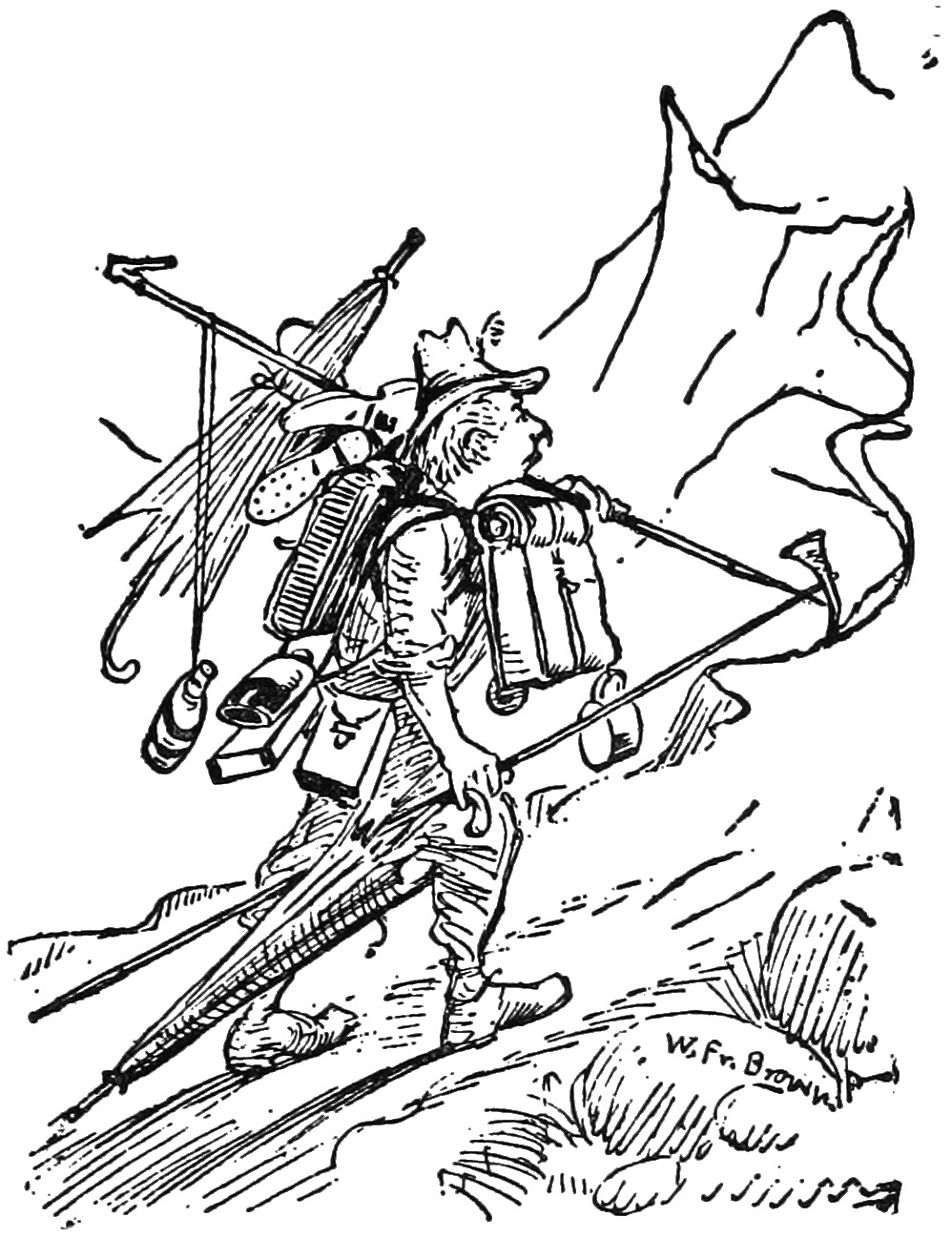

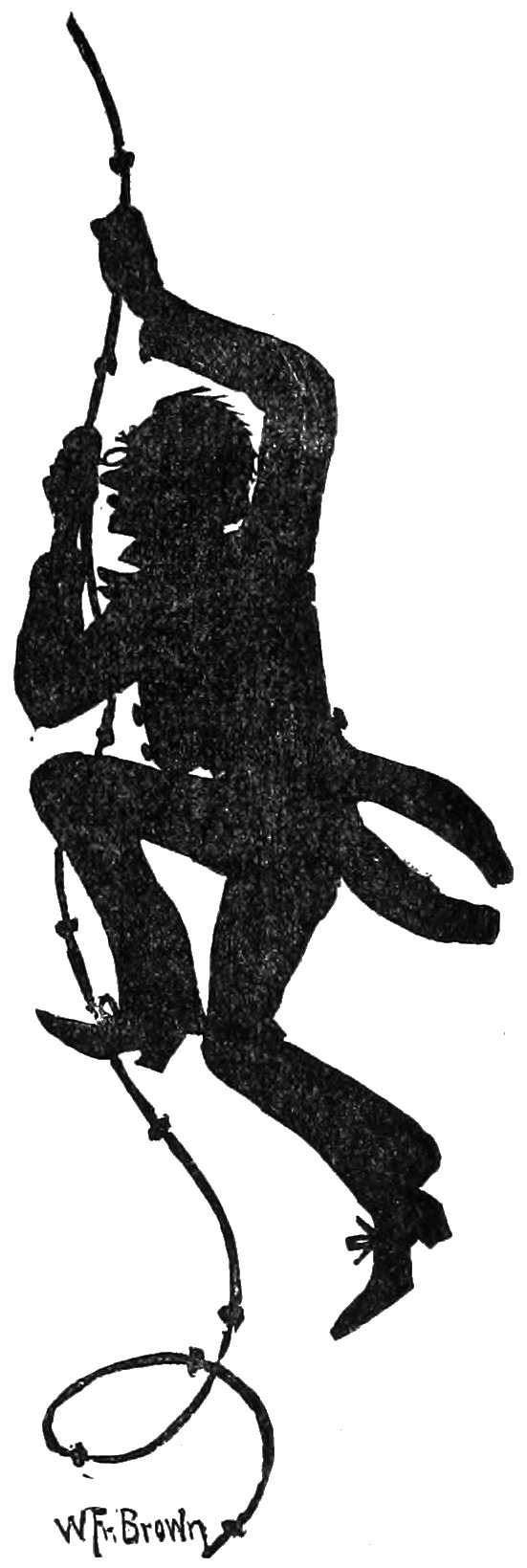

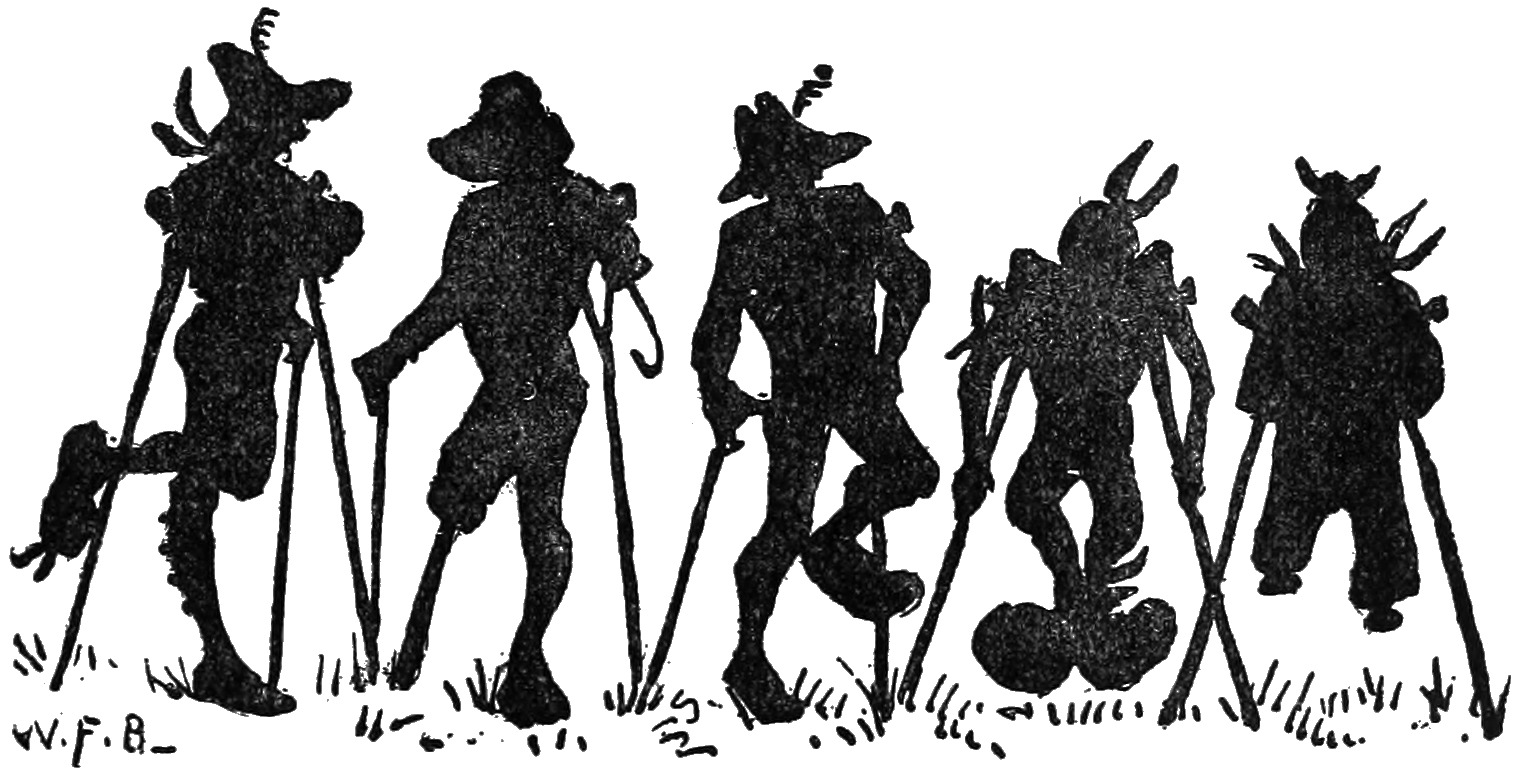

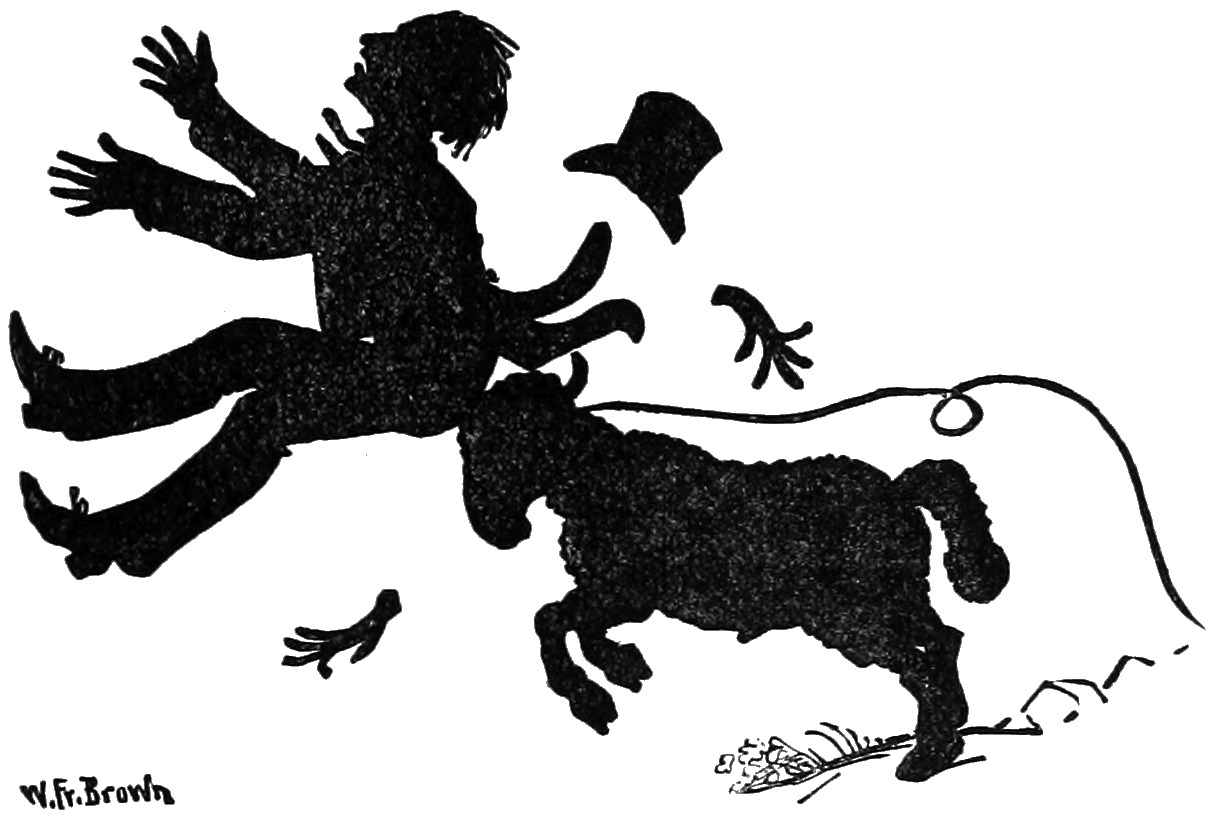

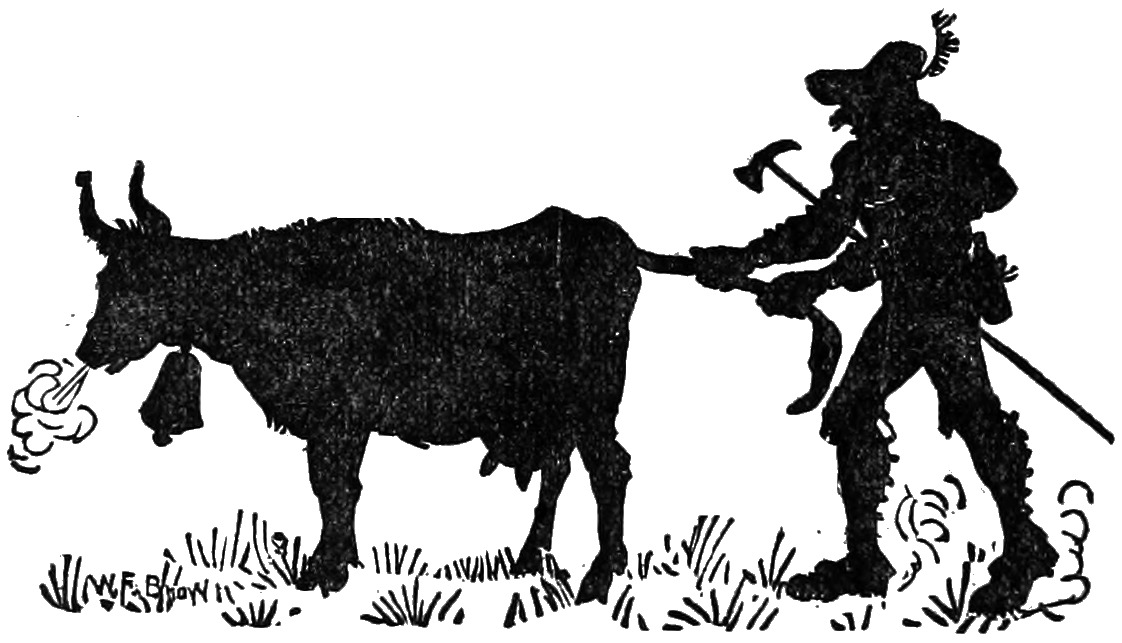

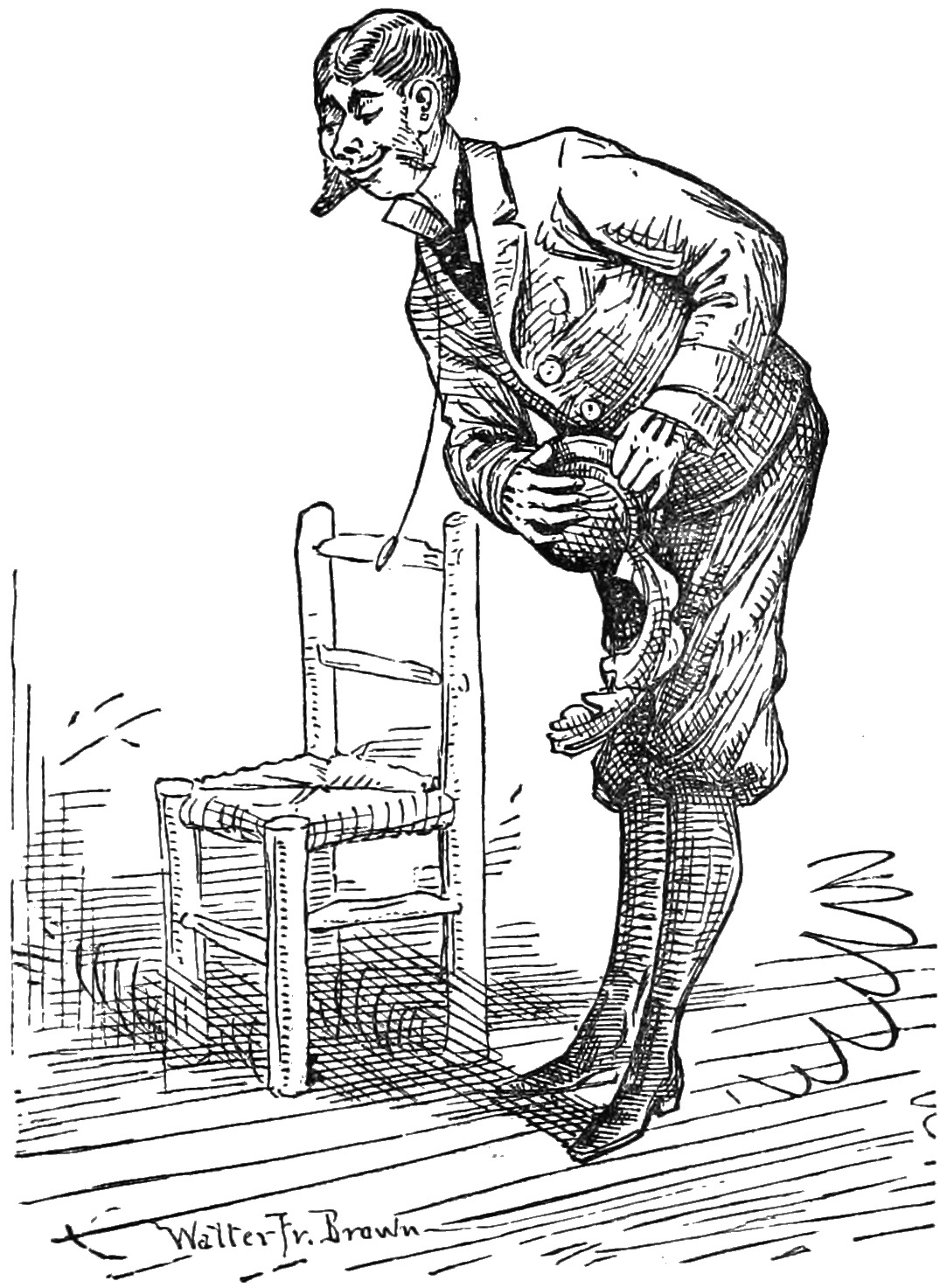

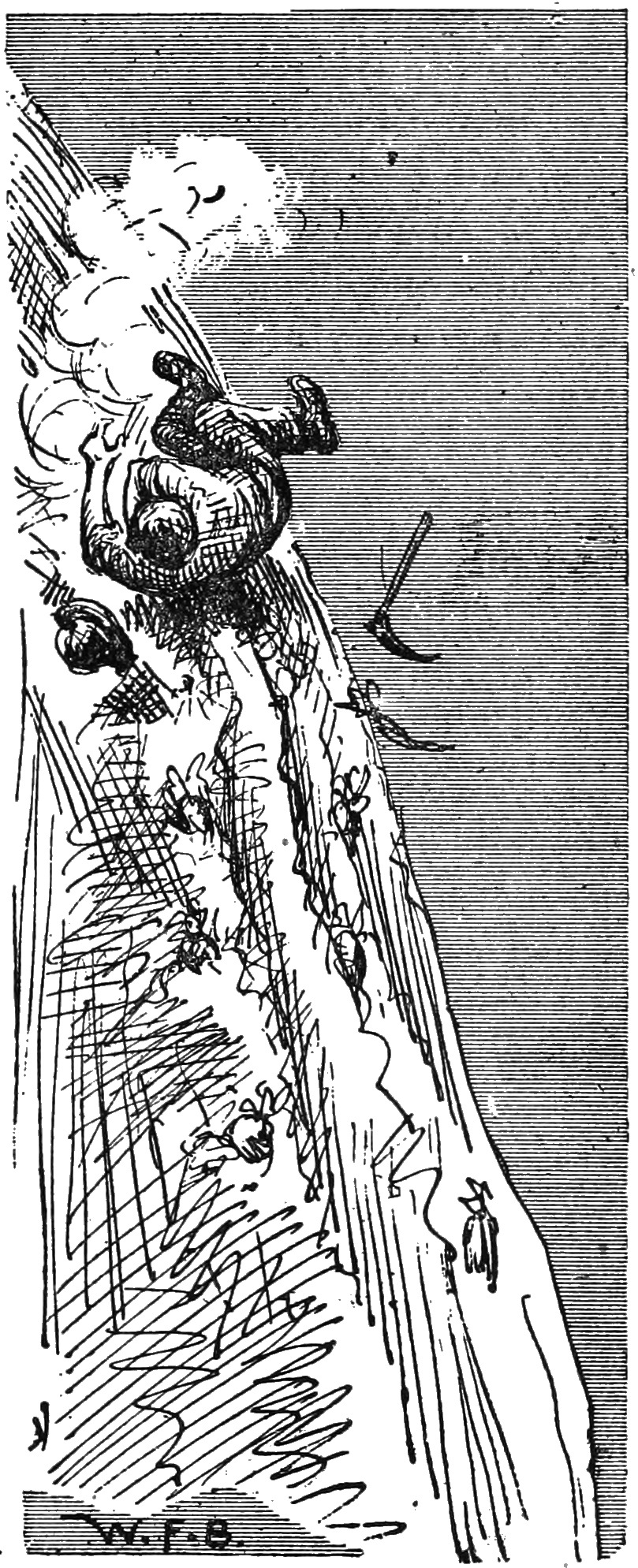

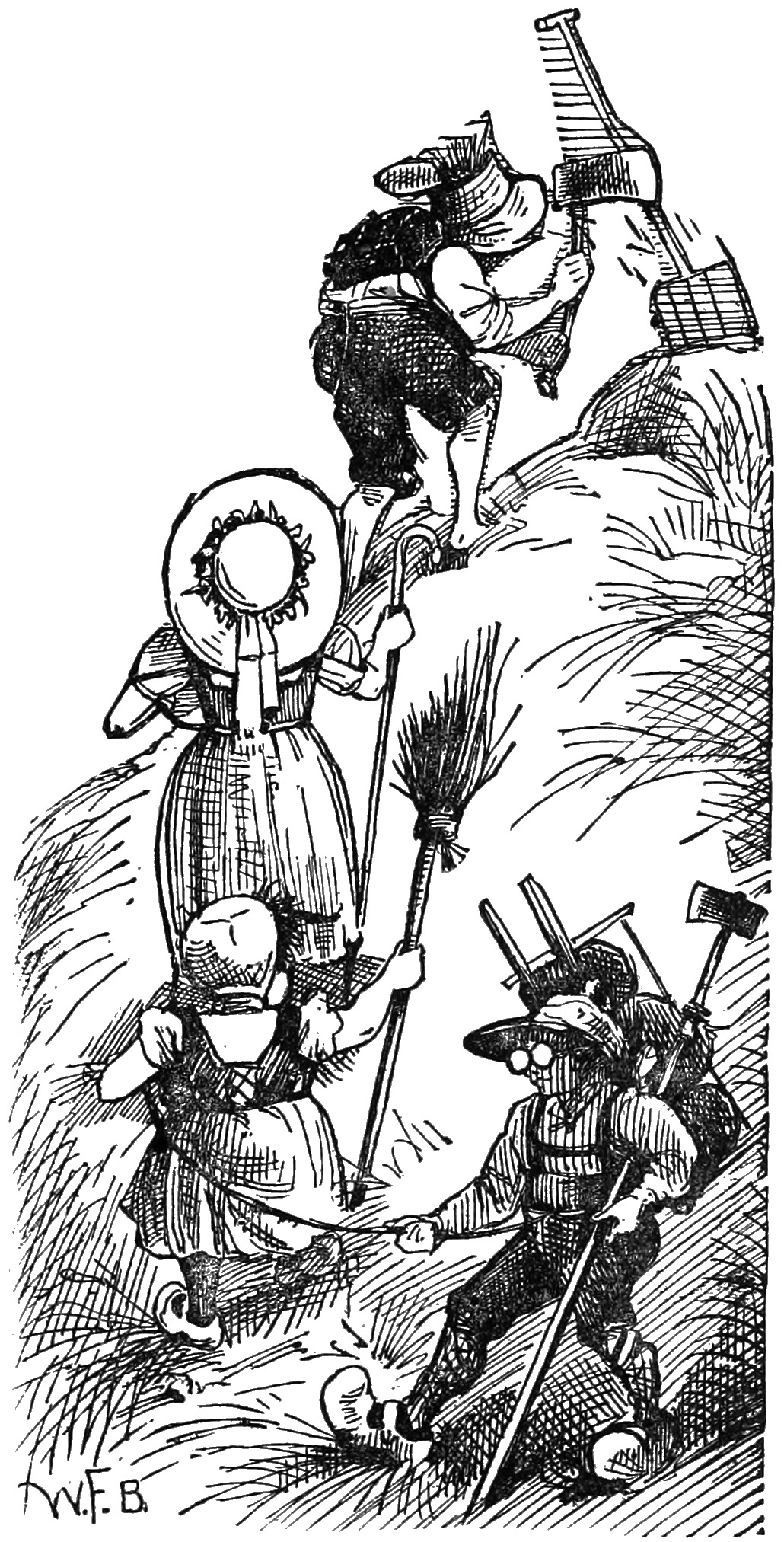

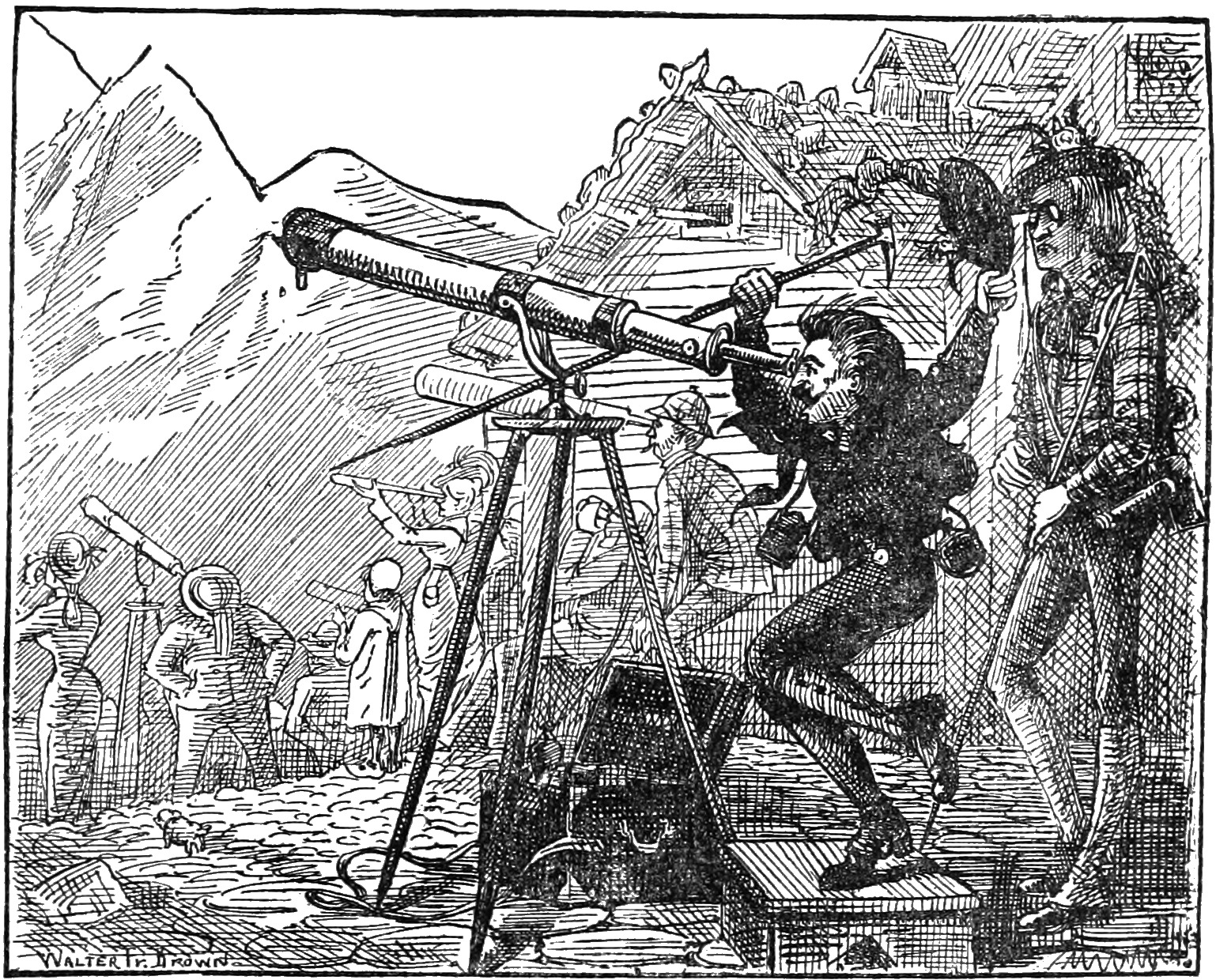

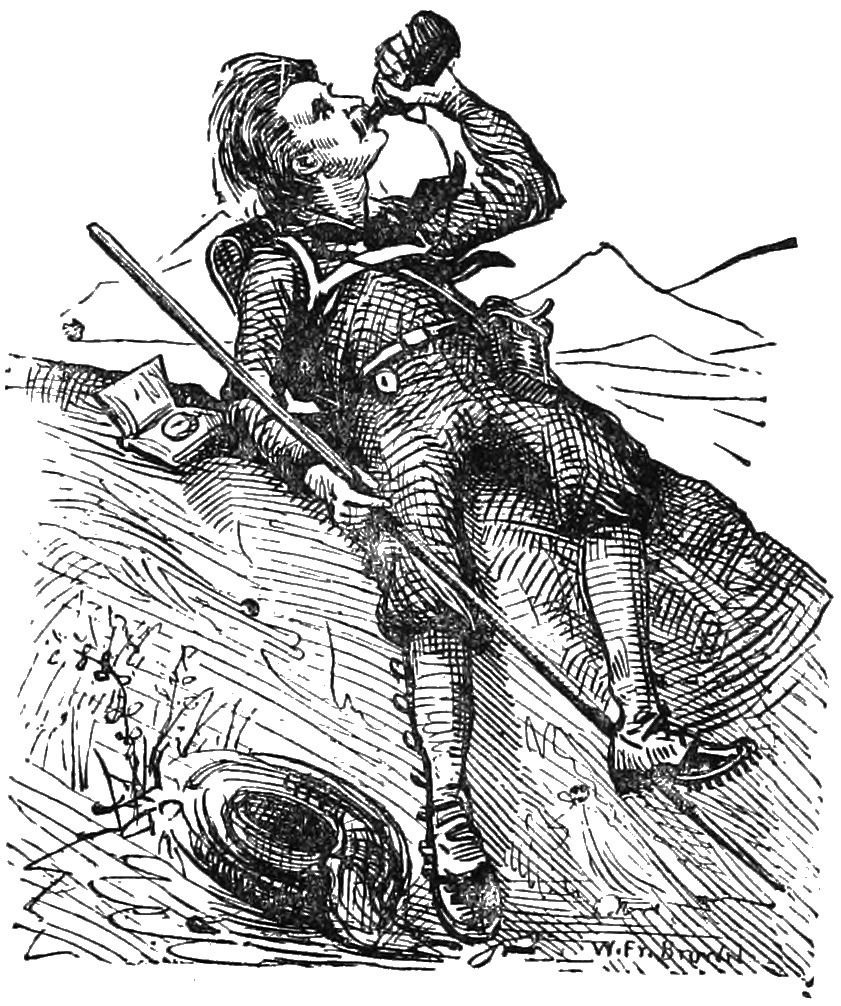

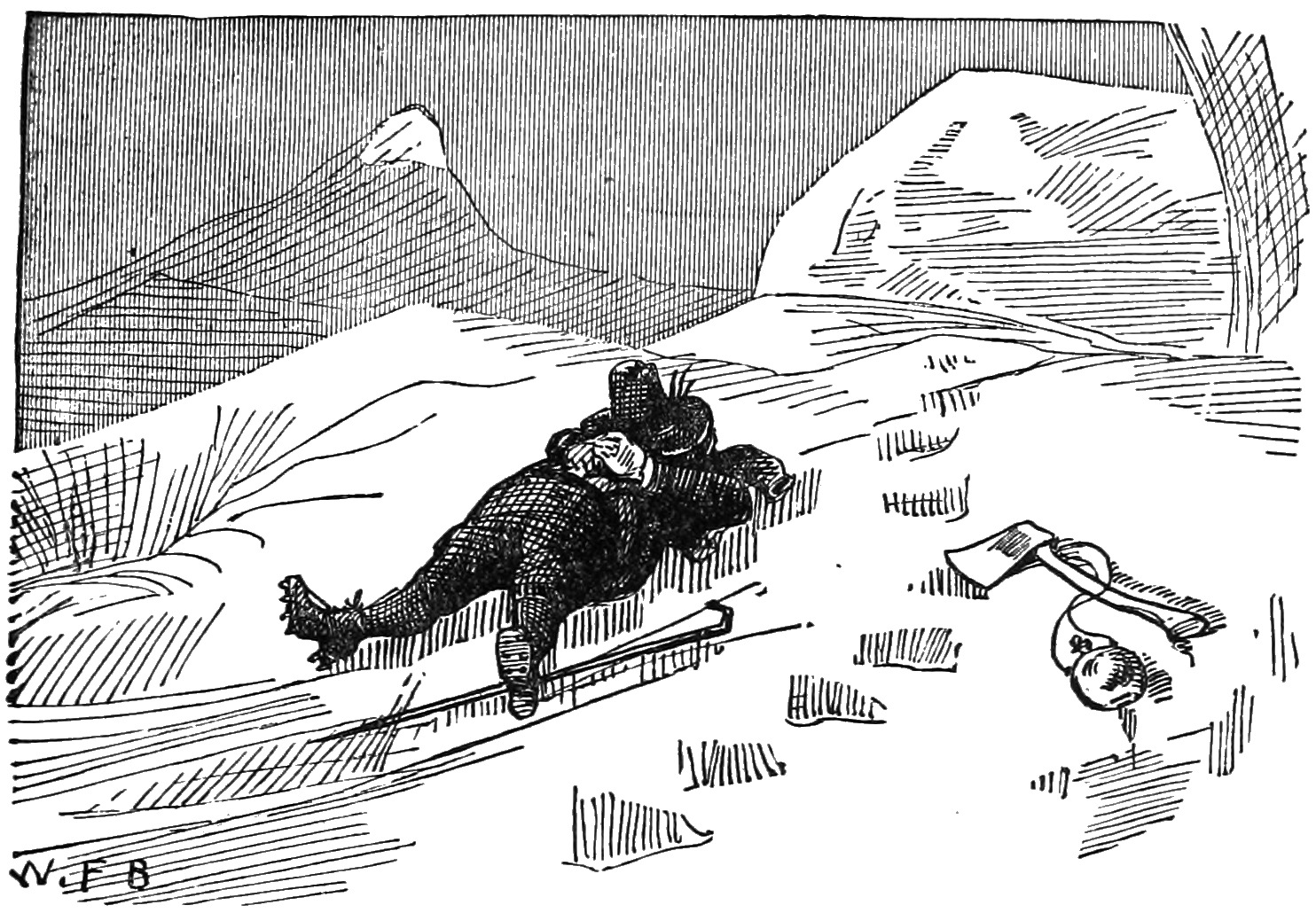

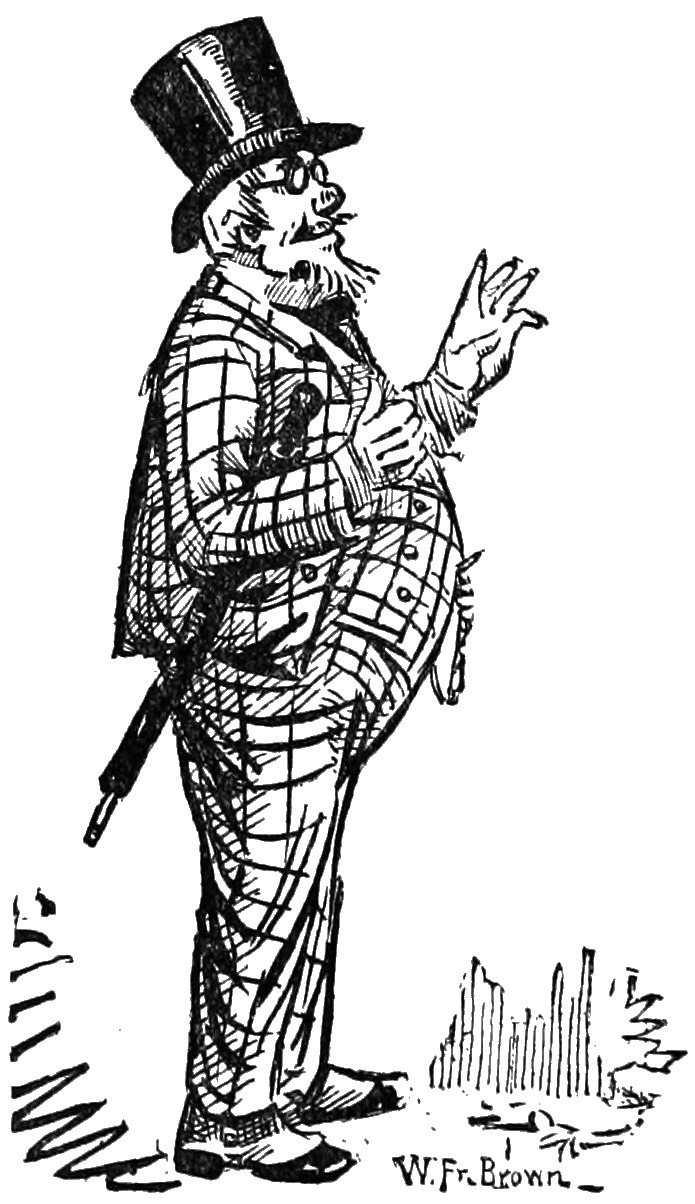

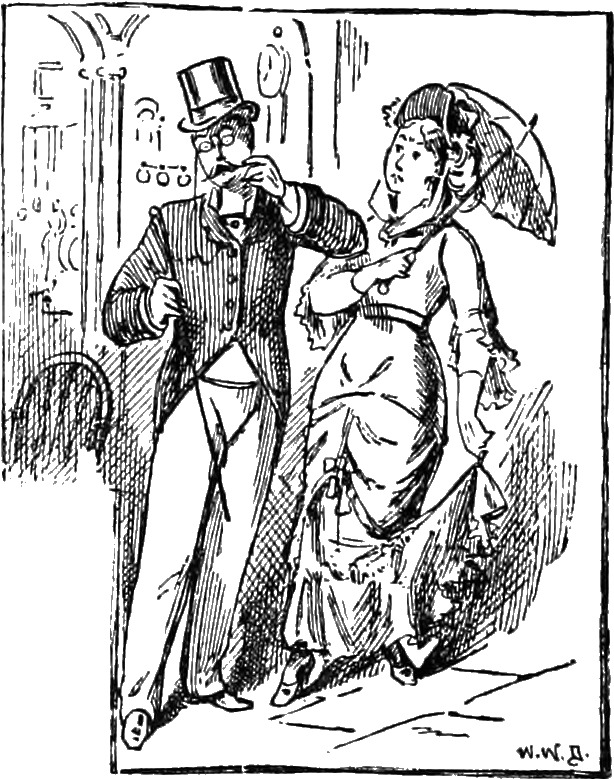

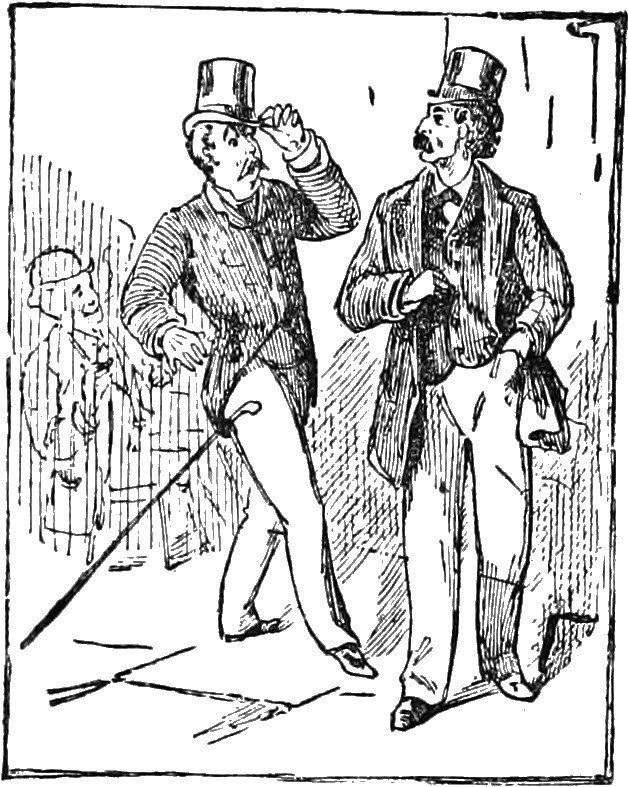

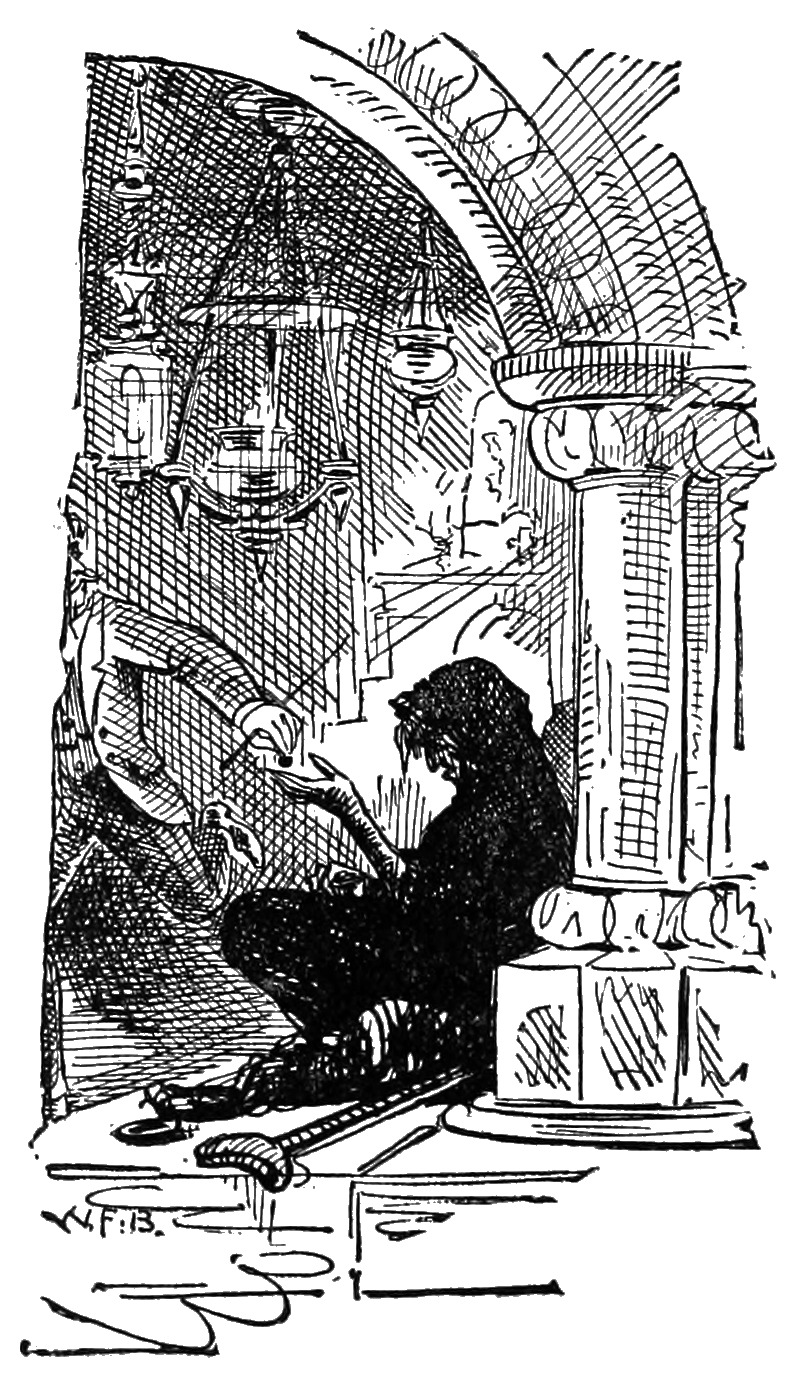

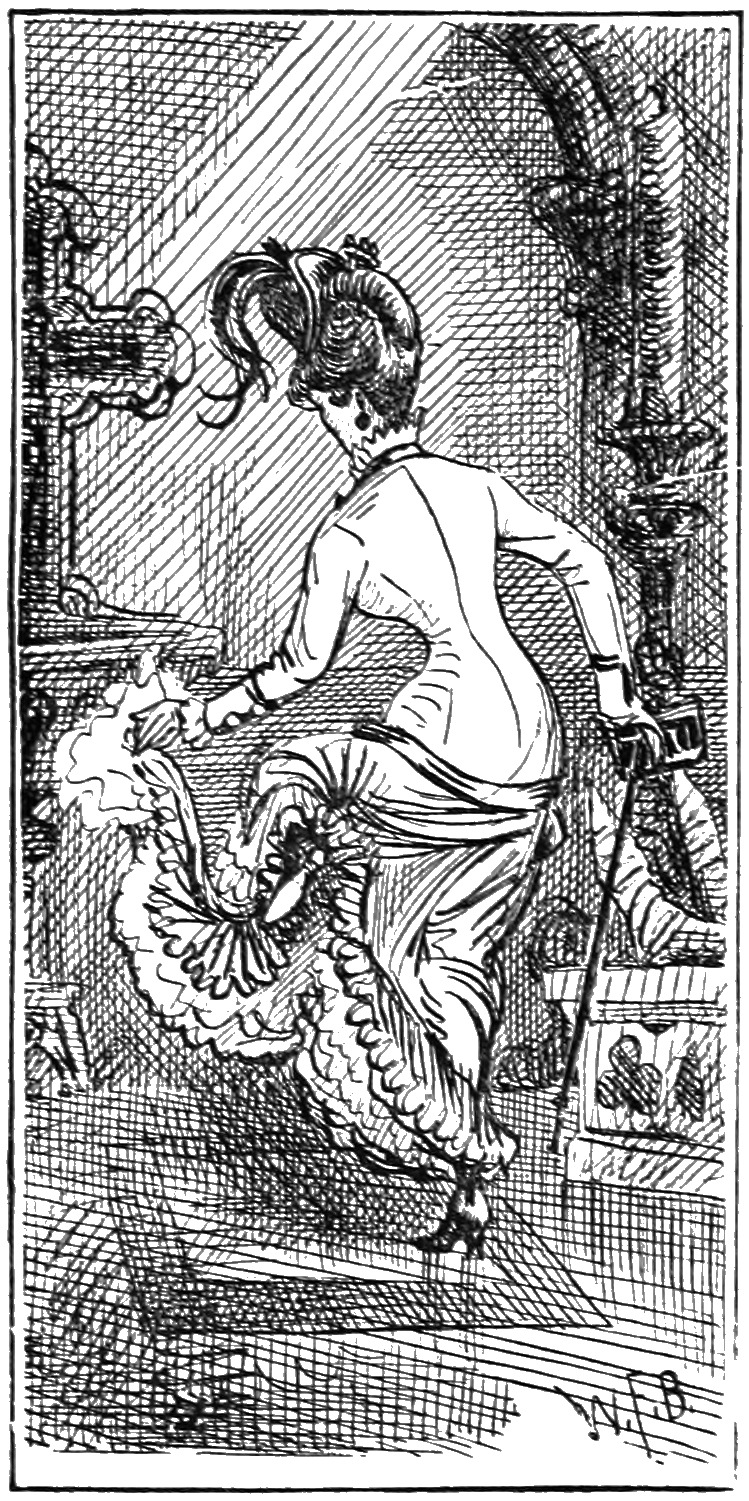

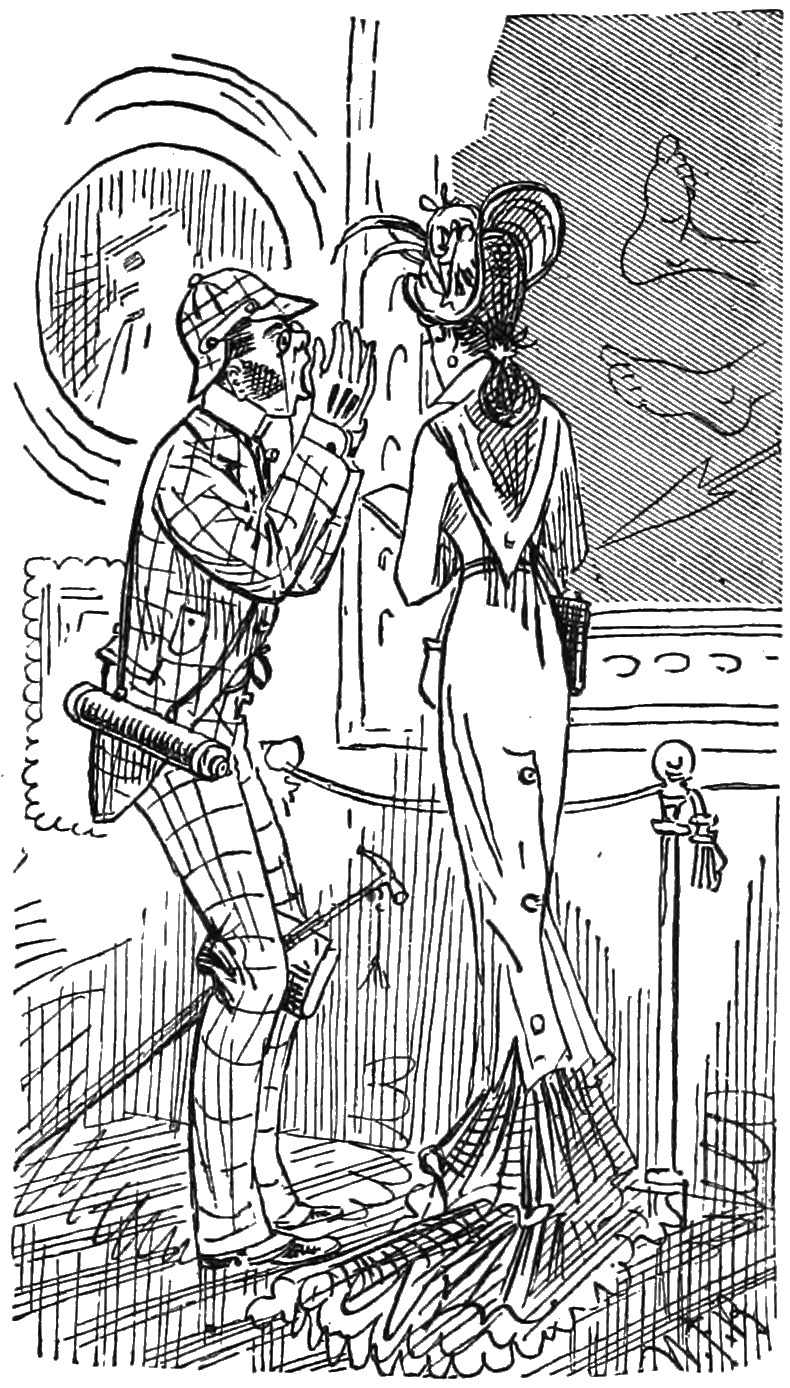

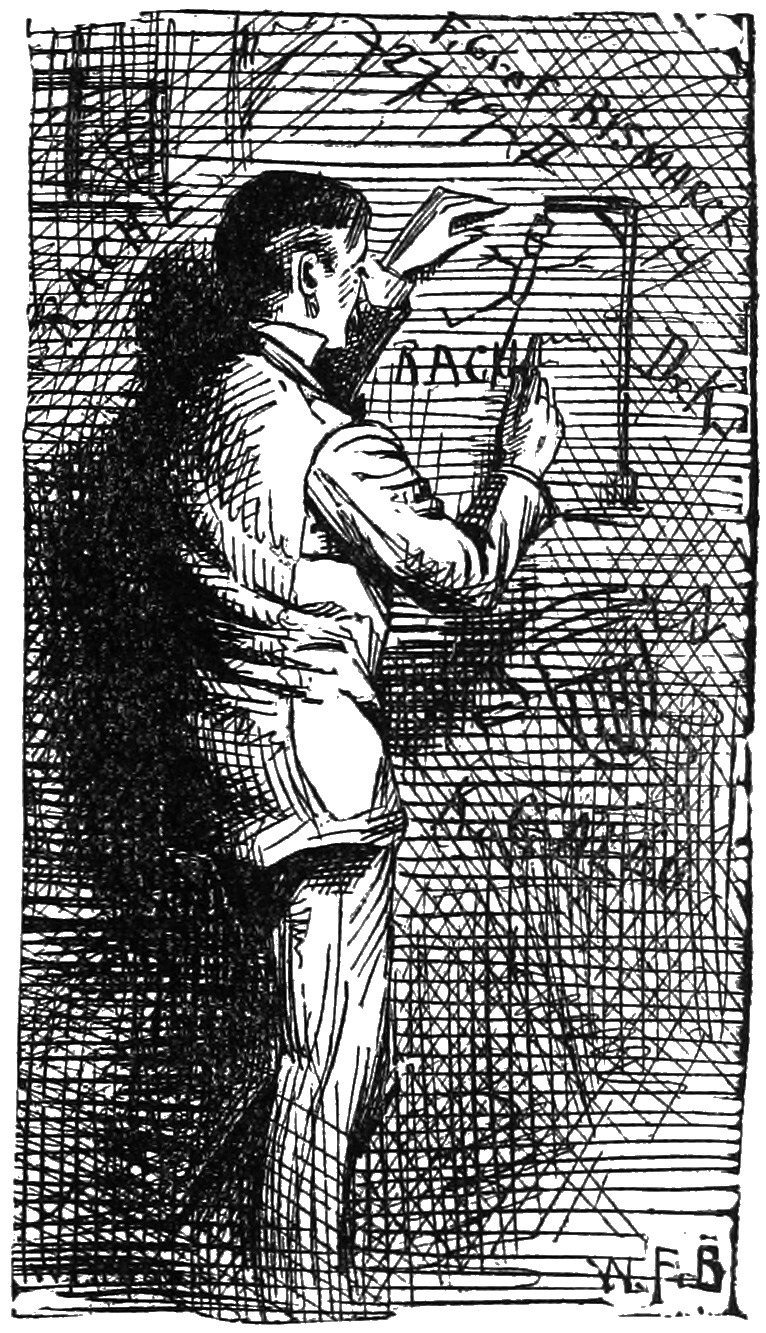

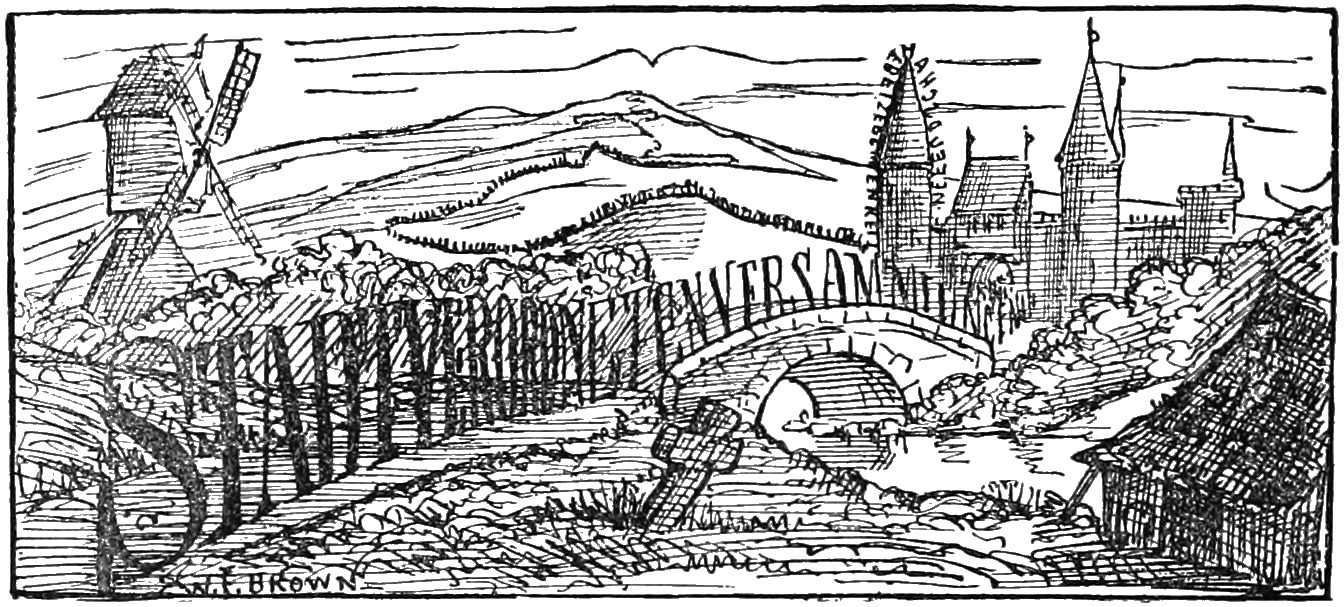
Other works

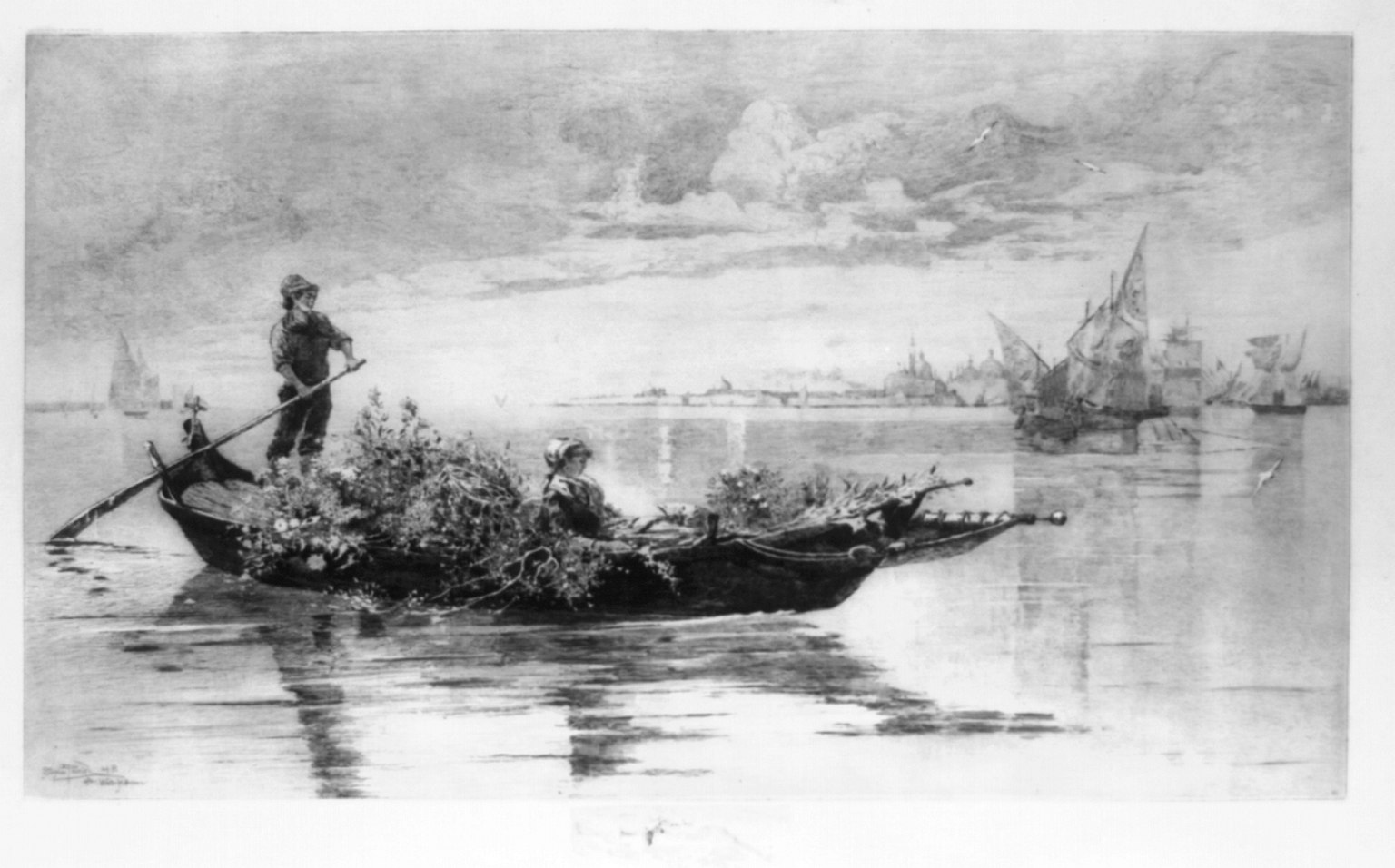
"Venice"
Stephen Parrish (1846–1938), etcher
Brown, artist
©1880, Christian Klackner (1850–1919), New York
LCCN 96-512385

== Family ==
Brown, in 1885, married Louise Tifft Beckwith (maiden; 1854–1932). His younger brother, Arthur Lewis Brown (1854–1928), was, from 1896 to 1927, United States district judge of the United States District Court for the District of Rhode Island. They both are nephews of naturalist and writer George Thurber (1821–1890).

=== Extended family and distant ancestors ===
Walter Francis Brown was a 5th great-grandson of Rev. Chad Brown, the progenitor of the Brown family of Rhode Island.

Chad Brown (c. 1600–1650) & Elizabeth Sharparowe (1604–1672)
John Brown I (1627–1677) & Married Holmes (1635–1690) son, et ux.
James Brown Elder (1662–1719) & Mary Tew Harris (1671–1736) grandson, et ux.
Deputy Governor Elisha Brown (1717–1802) & Martha Smith (1719–1760) great-grandson, et ux.
Captain Jeremiah Brown (1746–1817) & Susannah Welch (1756–1821); 2nd great-grandson, et ux.
Ebenezer Perkins Brown (1797–1839) & Sylvania (Sally) Jillson (1800–1851); 3rd great-grandson, et ux.
Samuel Welch Brown (1824–1907) & Mary Elizabeth Thurber (1827–1912); 4th great-grandson, et ux.
Walter Francis Brown (1853–1929) & Louise Tifft Beckwith (1854–1932); 5th great-grandson, et ux.

Brown was a first cousin – 3 times removed – of the four brothers who were instrumental in relocating Brown University to Providence and securing its endowment: (i) Nicholas Brown (1729–1791), (ii) Joseph Brown (1733–1785), (iii) John Brown (1736–1803), and (iv) Moses Brown (1738–1836). One of Nicholas's sons, Nicholas Brown, Jr. (1769–1841) is the university's namesake.

== Bibliography ==
=== References ===
- Boston Daily Globe (The) (June 26, 1873). "Educational: College Commencements – Brown University – One Hundred and Fifth Commencement – Degrees, Etc". Vol. 3, no. 151. pp. 1–5 – via Newspapers.com.
- "Brown, Walter Francis". Historical Catalogue of Brown University, 1764–1914. Vol. 1. Providence: Brown University. 1914. p. 239 – via Google Books.
- Cutter, William Richard (1913). "Chad Brown". New England Families – Genealogical and Memorial – A Record of the Achievements of Her People in the Making of Commonwealths and the Founding of a Nation. Vol. 1. New York: Lewis Historical Publishing Company.
  - pdf via Library of Congress); LCCN 14-15054; OCLC 144570203 (all editions).
- Effgen, Alex Brink (2015). "'Young' Walter F. Brown: Before, During, and After A Tramp Abroad". The Mark Twain Annual. 13 (1). Penn State University Press: 63–77. doi:10.5325/marktwaij.13.1.0063. ISSN 1553-0981. JSTOR 10.5325/marktwaij.13.1.0063. OCLC 6441728207. S2CID 145383648.
- Hosking, Arthur Nicholas, ed. (1905). "Brown, Walter Francis". The Artists Year Book. Chicago: The Art League Publishing Association. p. 25. OCLC 2066495.
- Jacobsen, Anita, ed. (2002). Jacobsen's Biographical Index of American Artists: Artists Native to the United States or Working in the United States, From 1606 to 2002. Vol. 1. Carrollton, Texas: A. J. Publications. OCLC 836305641.
- Miller, Charles Thurber; Brown, Walter Francis (1874). The Settlement of Rhode Island. New York: The Graphic Co. LCCN 08020210. OCLC 3055330. (see bound cover at Museum of Fine Arts, Boston)
- "Literary Notes". The Philadelphia Inquirer. April 9, 1878. p. 7 – via Newspapers.com.
- Schmidt, Barbara (Fall 2001). "The Life and Art of True W. Williams". Mark Twain Journal. 39 (2): 1–60. ISSN 0025-3499. JSTOR 41641516. OCLC 5543455579.
