= World Beach Ultimate Championships =

Frisbee championship

- Frequency: Every two years
- Country: Worldwide
- Founded: 2004
- Organizer: WFDF
- 2025 World Beach Ultimate Championships

The World Beach Ultimate Championships is an international beach ultimate competition organized by World Flying Disc Federation. It has been held every two years since 2015. Beach ultimate features smaller teams (5 vs 5) playing on smaller fields. Teams from across the world compete in six regular divisions: open, women's, mixed, open masters, mixed masters, and open grand masters. The women's masters division was added for the first time in 2015, and the open great grand masters was added in 2017. In the 2025 edition, two new divisions—women's grand masters and mixed grand masters—will added.

== Edition ==
Year	Date	Host	Top nation
2004	August 25–29	Figueira da Foz, Portugal	United States
2007	December 11–16	Maceió, Brazil	United States
2011	August 22–28	Lignano Sabbiadoro, Italy	United States
2015	March 8–13	Dubai, United Arab Emirates	United States
2017	June 18–24	Royan, France	United States
2021	Cancelled due to COVID-19		
2023	November 1–5	Huntington Beach, CA, United States	United States
2025	November 16–22	Algarve, Portugal	United States

== Medal table ==
Rank	Nation	Gold	Silver	Bronze	Total
1	United States	33	6	3	42
2	Germany	3	4	5	12
3	Canada	2	13	6	21
4	Great Britain	2	5	7	14
5	France	1	2	6	9
6	Australia	1	2	4	7
7	Austria	1	2	3	6
8	Russia	1	1	0	2
9	Spain	0	3	3	6
10	Philippines	0	3	2	5
11	Sweden	0	1	1	2
12	Belgium	0	1	0	1
12	Netherlands	0	1	0	1
14	Czech Republic	0	0	1	1
14	Denmark	0	0	1	1
14	Finland	0	0	1	1
14	Switzerland	0	0	1	1
Totals (17 entries)		44	44	44	132
