= World Under-24 Ultimate Championships =

- Frequency: Every two years
- Country: Worldwide
- Founded: 2013
- Organizer: WFDF
- 2025 World Under-24 Ultimate Championships

The World Under-24 Ultimate Championships is an international ultimate competition organized by World Flying Disc Federation. It is held every two years, with athletes competing in the under-24 age category. Teams from across the world compete in three divisions: open, women’s, and mixed.

== Edition ==
Year	Date	Host	Top nation
2013	July 22–28	Toronto, Canada	United States
2015	July 12–18	London, United Kingdom	United States
2018	January 7–13	Perth, Australia	United States
2019	July 13–20	Heidelberg, Germany	United States
2021	Cancelled due to COVID-19		
2023	July 2–8	Nottingham, United Kingdom	United States
2025	June 21–28	Logroño, Spain	United States
2027	June 19–26	Logroño, Spain	

== Medal table ==
As of the 2025 World Under-24 Ultimate Championships.

Rank	Nation	Gold	Silver	Bronze	Total
1	United States	17	1	0	18
2	Japan	1	6	3	10
3	Canada	0	6	6	12
4	Belgium	0	2	0	2
5	Australia	0	1	3	4
6	Italy	0	1	1	2
6	Singapore	0	1	1	2
8	Germany	0	0	2	2
9	France	0	0	1	1
9	Great Britain	0	0	1	1
Totals (10 entries)		18	18	18	54
