= USA Ultimate =

Not-for-profit organization

- Formerly: Ultimate Players Association
- Sport: Ultimate
- Founded: 1979
- CEO: Kevin Erlenbach
- Country: United States
- Website: http://www.usaultimate.org

USA Ultimate is a non-profit organization that serves as the governing body of the sport of ultimate (also known as ultimate Frisbee) in the United States.

It was founded in 1979 as the Ultimate Players Association, but rebranded itself as USA Ultimate on May 25, 2010. The United States Olympic Committee, empowered to govern amateur sport in the USA per the Ted Stevens Olympic and Amateur Sports Act of 1978, officially recognized USA Ultimate as a Recognized Sport Organization on June 10, 2014.

== Overview ==
Its mission is "to advance the sport of Ultimate in the United States by enhancing and promoting Character, Community, and Competition." Its vision is that "Ultimate is widely known, played, and respected in the United States as a sport that inspires athletic excellence and integrity among participants and fans."

In addition to organizing and supporting national teams to represent the nation in international and world championship competitions, a major focus of USA Ultimate is the Championship Series; it sanctions certain tournaments throughout the year in five divisions (Club, college, Youth, Masters, Beach) and runs the local, regional and/or national championship tournaments at the end of the respective seasons. These events are governed by the 11th Edition Rules. While the national champion is crowned in various divisions of the USA Ultimate Championships, four Canadian teams have won championships over the years in different divisions- Vancouver's Furious George (Club Open), University of British Columbia (College Women's), Stick Dog (Masters Women's), and Winnipeg's MOFO (Youth Club Mixed).

In 2008, the 40th Anniversary of the birth of ultimate, USA Ultimate adopted a Five Year Strategic Plan with input from ultimate players throughout the United States, in hopes of facilitating the growth and evolution of the sport for the next forty years.

=== Club Competition ===
The Club division is currently the only competition division that is not restricted by age (like Youth and Masters) nor school enrollment (like High School and College), but is rather subdivided only by gender into Men's (open to any gender and previously called "Open"), Women's, and Mixed (with prescribed gender ratios) gender divisions, which have their regular seasons in the summer and their post-season championship series in the fall. The first national championship took place in 1979 in State College, Pennsylvania. The Women's division was added in 1981. The age-based Masters Open (now Men's) and Women's divisions were added to the Club division in 1991; the Masters Women's division was discontinued in 1997, and the Masters Men's division joined Grandmasters in a separate summer Masters Division in 2012. The Mixed Division was added in 1998. Club national championship tournaments were held in Sarasota, FL from 2000 through 2012, and in 2013 USA Ultimate began moving around the location, starting with Frisco, TX for 3 years and then Rockford, IL in 2016. The event returned to Sarasota, FL in 2017, followed by San Diego, CA in 2018 and 2019.

The Triple Crown Tour was established in 2013. The three achievements are: winning the US Open tournament, winning the Pro Flight Finale and winning the national championship. Previously, finishing the regular season with a #1 season ranking replaced the Pro Flight Finale component. San Francisco's Revolver in the men's division and Seattle's Mixtape in the mixed division won all three achievements in 2013 and 2017, respectively.

=== College Competition ===
The college division is subdivided into Women's and Men's (open to any gender and previously called "Open" despite the vast majority of participants identifying as men) gender divisions, which have their regular season in the winter and spring. Over 300 Open teams and 200 Women's teams took part in the College Championship Series in 2005. The College Open division was first held in 1984 in Somerville, MA and was won by Stanford University. The College Women's Division was added in 1987. In fall 2017, USAU added mixed regional tournaments with 5 regions. In 2018, another region was added for a total of 6 regional championship events.

=== Youth Competition ===
Originally, the National Youth championship was loosely a high school-based competition, with guidelines determining how many players must be from one high school. In the early 21st century, USA Ultimate moved more towards a complete high school nationals, which launched in 1998 in Maplewood, NJ.

In 2005, two significant changes were made: High School Nationals was split into Easterns and Westerns, split by the Mississippi River, held in May each year, and a Youth Club Championships was created, for club teams assembled from various cities/regions across North America, held in August each year at the National Sports Center. Over 24 states currently hold high school ultimate state championship tournaments that are operated by local USA Ultimate Competition State Youth Coordinator volunteer staff.

=== Masters Competition ===
The Masters division currently consists of Masters Men, Masters Women and Grandmasters Men's divisions. In 2017, USA Ultimate added Masters Mixed, Grandmasters Women, and Great Grandmasters Men's divisions. To compete in the single gender or the mixed division Masters division, men must be 33 years old and women must be 30 years old. To compete in the Grandmasters division, men must be 40 years old and women must be 37 years old. To compete in the Great Grandmasters division, men must be 50 years old and women must be 45 years or older. Regional championships are played in the early to mid summer with the national championship occurring in the mid to late summer.

=== Beach Competition ===
The Beach division, played on a smaller sand-covered surface with fewer players per side than the grass format, was officially added by USA Ultimate in May 2015 with the introduction of a national championship tournament in Virginia Beach, VA. The event returned in 2016, and the division added the US Beach Open event in Santa Monica, CA, in November 2016. In 2017, the division will return both of those events as well as a third new Beach Western Championship event in April in Santa Monica, CA. Four geographic regions have been established for the East Coast, Great Lakes, Gulf Coast, and West, each with an assigned resident Regional Director volunteer staff position. However, regional championships have not yet been presented as viable, until the division grows further in size and popularity. Outreach efforts were established to promote the sand format and point out to organizers that existing sand volleyball courts can be used for modified formats in places that are not coastal or accessible to large public areas of natural flat sand, such as coasts and beaches.

=== Other programs ===
Aside from the championship series, several community development programs exist to advance the sport at local and grassroots levels. Event Sanctioning provides insurance, marketing, exposure, connections to rankings for some competition divisions and discounts on materials for tournaments, leagues and training events (like practices, scrimmages, camps, clinics, etc.). The Affiliate program connects the national office to existing organizations that are dedicated to advancing the sport in a specific metro area. The State-Based Organization initiative funds and supports the establishment of new state-focused governing bodies to assume the role of the national office with a dedicated focus on a single state or perhaps a few contiguous states, where geography and population dynamics warrant the combination. New Start Program Grants are given out quarterly to local ultimate organizers who apply for materials to start brand new ultimate programs.

USA Ultimate is run by a thirteen-person Board of Directors, seven of which are elected by the membership, including three by the elite athlete player segment, five of which are appointed by existing board members, including three which must be independent in connections to the organization, and an ex-officio position for the chief executive officer who is hired by the board and is also head of the staff. Officers are elected by board members on an annual basis. Each appointed and elected director's term is three years, rotated such that four seats come up for election each calendar year. The Board is responsible for overseeing the chief executive officer, budgeting, strategic planning, setting organizational policies and serving on various working groups that include Equity & Diversity, Audit & Ethics, Nominating, Investment, Marketing, Strategic Planning, et al.

Nearly 62,000 people joined as members of USA Ultimate in 2019, the largest membership year so far. In 2024, memberships for a single calendar year cost $69 per calendar year for adult and college players, $40 per year for Youth players under 20 years old who have not yet graduated from high school, $25 for non-players (coaches, chaperones, etc.), and $18 for local Affiliate recreational participants. Multiyear discounts are available for most levels. A lifetime membership is also available for $999. Membership covers participation at sanctioned and championship events; accident and liability insurance in those events; attendance at USA Ultimate education clinics; certification options at various levels of coaching, tournament directing and officiating (called "observing"); voting in board elections; seeking election to the board of directors; discounts with several partner sponsors; scholarship opportunities; access to the USA Ultimate mobile app to follow events, access the rules, event guides for national championships, and report scores for sanctioned events; access to USA Ultimate electronic newsletters and updates; and discounted USA Ultimate merchandise.

USA Ultimate is a member of the World Flying Disc Federation, the international governing body for flying disc sports. WFDF is a member of the General Association for International Sport Federations (GAISF), The International World Games Association (IWGA), and the International Council of Sport Science and Physical Education (ICSSPE), as well as an officially recognized International Federation by the International Olympic Committee (IOC).

== Championship series history ==
=== Club and Masters National Championships ===
Year	Open	Women	Mixed	Masters Open	Masters Women	Masters Mixed	Grandmasters Open	Grandmasters Women	Grandmasters Mixed	Great Grandmasters Open	Great Grandmasters Women
2026	Ring of Fire (2)	Brute Squad (6)	Hybrid (3)	Surly (8)	Ripe	regret. (2)	Kalakala	Henceforth	Dial-up	Surly GGM (5)	Well Done
2025	Revolver (6)	Brute Squad (5)	Hybrid (2)	Boneyard (3)	Old News	Atlanta Fawkes	Black Cans	Wisconsin Bitter (2)	Embers	Surly GGM (4)	Trophy Wives
2024	Rhino Slam!	Fury (13)	Hybrid	Voltron 2020 (4)	StellO	regret.	Johnny Walker (5)	Wisconsin Bitter	Surly GMX	Surly GGM (3)	PerSisters
2023	Truck Stop	Brute Squad (4)	shame.	Boneyard (2)	Reboot Squad (2)	SaLT	Johnny Walker (4)	Molly Blue (2)	Molasses Disaster	Immortals	Silver Sisters
2022	Johnny Bravo (2)	Molly Brown	Mixtape (2)	Voltron 2020 (3)	Surly COUGARS (3)	Cool Biz (2)	Junkyard	Elderflowers	—N/a	Surly (2)	—N/a
2021	Ring of Fire	Fury (12)	BFG	Voltron 2020 (2)	Reboot Squad	Slower	Johnny Walker (3)	Molly Blue	—N/a	Relics (3)	—N/a
2020	Cancelled due to COVID-19										—N/a
2019	Sockeye (4)	Brute Squad (3)	AMP (2)	Voltron 2020	Golden Poppies	Cool Biz	Surly GM (3)	Solstice	—N/a	Relics (2)	—N/a
2018	PoNY	Fury (11)	AMP	Surly (7)	Surly COUGARS (2)	Hey Babe	Eldors	Furari	—N/a	Surly	—N/a
2017	Revolver (5)	Fury (10)	Mixtape	Johnny Encore	Surly COUGARS	UPAARP	Surly (2)	Boston	—N/a	Relics	—N/a
2016	Ironside	Brute Squad (2)	Slow White	Surly (6)	Molly Grey	—N/a	Johnny Walker (2)	—N/a	—N/a	—N/a	
2015	Revolver (4)	Brute Squad	Drag'n Thrust (3)	Boneyard	Baylands Kite Flying Team	—N/a	Johnny Walker	—N/a	—N/a	—N/a	
2014	Johnny Bravo	Scandal (2)	Drag'n Thrust (2)	Tejas	Loose Cannon	—N/a	Surly	—N/a	—N/a	—N/a	
2013	Revolver (3)	Scandal	Drag'n Thrust	Surly (5)	Godiva	—N/a	No Country (2)	—N/a	—N/a	—N/a	
2012	Doublewide	Fury (9)	Blackbird (2)	Surly (4)	—N/a	—N/a	No Country	—N/a	—N/a	—N/a	
2011	Revolver (2)	Fury (8)	Blackbird	Surly (3)	Stick Dog	—N/a	Scrapple	—N/a	—N/a	—N/a	
2010	Revolver	Fury (7)	Polar Bears	Surly (2)	Well Done (2)	—N/a	Old And In The Way	—N/a	—N/a	—N/a	
2009	Chain Lightning	Fury (6)	Axis of C'Ville	Troubled Past	Well Done	—N/a	Death or Glory	—N/a	—N/a	—N/a	
2008	Jam	Fury (5)	Mental Toss Flycoons	Surly	—N/a	—N/a	—N/a	—N/a	—N/a	—N/a	
2007	Sockeye (3)	Fury (4)	Shazam Returns	Death or Glory	—N/a	—N/a	—N/a	—N/a	—N/a	—N/a	
2006	Sockeye (2)	Fury (3)	Mischief	Throwback	—N/a	—N/a	—N/a	—N/a	—N/a	—N/a	
2005	Furious George (3)	Riot (2)	Brass Monkey	Old and in the Way (2)	—N/a	—N/a	—N/a	—N/a	—N/a	—N/a	
2004	Sockeye	Riot	Shazam	Kavu	—N/a	—N/a	—N/a	—N/a	—N/a	—N/a	
2003	Furious George (2)	Fury (2)	Donner Party (2)	Refugees	—N/a	—N/a	—N/a	—N/a	—N/a	—N/a	
2002	Furious George	Lady Godiva (9)	Donner Party	Old Sag	—N/a	—N/a	—N/a	—N/a	—N/a	—N/a	
2001	Condors (3)	Lady Godiva (8)	Trigger Hippy	Keg Workers (2)	—N/a	—N/a	—N/a	—N/a	—N/a	—N/a	
2000	Condors (2)	Lady Godiva (7)	Spear	Keg Workers	—N/a	—N/a	—N/a	—N/a	—N/a	—N/a	
1999	Death or Glory (6)	Fury	Raleigh Llama	Old and In The Way	—N/a	—N/a	—N/a	—N/a	—N/a	—N/a	
1998	Death or Glory (5)	Lady Godiva (6)	Red Fish Blue Fish	Cigar	—N/a	—N/a	—N/a	—N/a	—N/a	—N/a	
1997	Death or Glory (4)	Lady Godiva (5)	—N/a	YESSSS!	S-Prime	—N/a	—N/a	—N/a	—N/a	—N/a	
1996	Death or Glory (3)	Lady Godiva (4)	—N/a	Windy City	Great Dames	—N/a	—N/a	—N/a	—N/a	—N/a	
1995	Death or Glory (2)	Lady Godiva (3)	—N/a	Squash	What?	—N/a	—N/a	—N/a	—N/a	—N/a	
1994	Death or Glory	Felix	—N/a	US Tampico	Pickled Peppers	—N/a	—N/a	—N/a	—N/a	—N/a	
1993	New York (6)	Maine-iacs (3)	—N/a	Beyondors	Texas Woo Dolls	—N/a	—N/a	—N/a	—N/a	—N/a	
1992	New York (5)	Maine-iacs (2)	—N/a	Rude Boys	Over the Swill	—N/a	—N/a	—N/a	—N/a	—N/a	
1991	New York (4)	Lady Godiva (2)	—N/a	Red Menace	Hot Flashes	—N/a	—N/a	—N/a	—N/a	—N/a	
1990	New York (3)	Maine-iacs	—N/a	—N/a	—N/a	—N/a	—N/a	—N/a	—N/a	—N/a	
1989	New York (2)	Crush Club	—N/a	—N/a	—N/a	—N/a	—N/a	—N/a	—N/a	—N/a	
1988	Tsunami	Lady Godiva	—N/a	—N/a	—N/a	—N/a	—N/a	—N/a	—N/a	—N/a	
1987	New York	Condors (4)	—N/a	—N/a	—N/a	—N/a	—N/a	—N/a	—N/a	—N/a	
1986	Windy City (2)	Condors (3)	—N/a	—N/a	—N/a	—N/a	—N/a	—N/a	—N/a	—N/a	
1985	Flying Circus	Condors (2)	—N/a	—N/a	—N/a	—N/a	—N/a	—N/a	—N/a	—N/a	
1984	Tunas	Condors	—N/a	—N/a	—N/a	—N/a	—N/a	—N/a	—N/a	—N/a	
1983	Windy City	Fisheads	—N/a	—N/a	—N/a	—N/a	—N/a	—N/a	—N/a	—N/a	
1982	Rude Boys	Zulu	—N/a	—N/a	—N/a	—N/a	—N/a	—N/a	—N/a	—N/a	
1981	Condors	B.L.U.	—N/a	—N/a	—N/a	—N/a	—N/a	—N/a	—N/a	—N/a	
1980	Glassboro (2)	—N/a	—N/a	—N/a	—N/a	—N/a	—N/a	—N/a	—N/a	—N/a	
1979	Glassboro	—N/a	—N/a	—N/a	—N/a	—N/a	—N/a	—N/a	—N/a	—N/a	

=== US Open Ultimate Championships ===
Year	Open	Women	Mixed
2026	Revolver (5)	Scandal (2)	Hybrid (3)
2025	Revolver (4)	Fury (4)	Hybrid (2)
2024	Truck Stop (2)	Fury (3)	Hybrid
2023	PoNY (2)	Scandal	AMP (3)
2022	Truck Stop	—N/a	AMP (2)
2021	Sockeye (3)	—N/a	—N/a
2020	Cancelled due to COVID-19		
2019	Sockeye (2)	Brute Squad (3)	Drag'n Thrust
2018	PoNY	Brute Squad (2)	AMP
2017	Sockeye	Club Deportivo Revolution	Mixtape
2016	Machine	Brute Squad	Slow White
2015	Revolver (3)	Fury (2)	Ellipsis
2014	Revolver (2)	Riot (2)	Polar Bears (2)
2013	Revolver	Fury	Odyssée
2012	Johnny Bravo	Riot	Polar Bears

=== College Championships ===
Year	Division I Open	Division I Women's	Division III Open	Division III Women's
2026	University of Massachusetts Amherst	Carleton College - Syzygy	Middlebury College	Middlebury College
2025	Carleton College - CUT	University of British Columbia	Lewis & Clark College	Wesleyan University
2024	Brown University	University of North Carolina	St. Olaf College	University of Portland
2023	University of North Carolina	University of North Carolina	Colorado College	Middlebury College
2022	University of North Carolina	University of North Carolina	Oklahoma Christian University	Middlebury College
2021	University of North Carolina	University of North Carolina	Oklahoma Christian University	Middlebury College
2020	Cancelled due to COVID-19			
2019	Brown University	UC San Diego	Middlebury College	Oberlin College
2018	University of North Carolina	Dartmouth College	Bryant University	St. Olaf College
2017	Carleton College - CUT	Dartmouth College	University of Richmond	Carleton College - Eclipse
2016	University of Minnesota	Stanford University	Georgia College	Carleton College - Eclipse
2015	University of North Carolina	University of Oregon	Franciscan University	Rice University
2014	University of Colorado	Ohio State University	Bentley University	Rice University
2013	University of Pittsburgh	University of Oregon	Middlebury College	Bowdoin College
2012	University of Pittsburgh	University of Washington	Carleton College - Gods of Plastic	Claremont Colleges
2011	Carleton College - CUT	UC Santa Barbara	Claremont Colleges	Carleton College - Eclipse
2010	University of Florida	University of Oregon	Carleton College - Gods of Plastic	Pacific Lutheran University
2009	Carleton College - CUT	UC Santa Barbara	—N/a	—N/a
2008	University of Wisconsin-Madison Hodags	University of British Columbia	—N/a	—N/a
2007	University of Wisconsin-Madison Hodags	Stanford University	—N/a	—N/a
2006	University of Florida	Stanford University	—N/a	—N/a
2005	Brown University	Stanford University	—N/a	—N/a
2004	University of Colorado	UC Davis	—N/a	—N/a
2003	University of Wisconsin-Madison Hodags	University of Oregon	—N/a	—N/a
2002	Stanford University	UC San Diego	—N/a	—N/a
2001	Carleton College - CUT	University of Georgia	—N/a	—N/a
2000	Brown University	Carleton College - Syzygy	—N/a	—N/a
1999	North Carolina State University	Stanford University	—N/a	—N/a
1998	UC Santa Barbara	Stanford University	—N/a	—N/a
1997	UC Santa Barbara	Stanford University	—N/a	—N/a
1996	UC Santa Barbara	UNC Wilmington	—N/a	—N/a
1995	East Carolina University	UC Santa Cruz	—N/a	—N/a
1994	East Carolina University	UC Santa Cruz	—N/a	—N/a
1993	UNC Wilmington	UC Berkeley	—N/a	—N/a
1992	University of Oregon	UNC Wilmington	—N/a	—N/a
1991	UC Santa Cruz	UC Santa Barbara	—N/a	—N/a
1990	UC Santa Barbara	UC Santa Barbara	—N/a	—N/a
1989	UC Santa Barbara	UC Davis	—N/a	—N/a
1988	UC Santa Barbara	UC Santa Barbara	—N/a	—N/a
1987	Chabot College	University of Kansas	—N/a	—N/a
1986	University of Massachusetts Amherst	—N/a	—N/a	—N/a
1985	University of Pennsylvania	—N/a	—N/a	—N/a
1984	Stanford University	—N/a	—N/a	—N/a

=== Youth Club Championships ===
Year	U-20 Boys	U-20 Girls	U-20 Mixed	U-17 Boys	U-17 Girls
2026	SmOAK (Oakland)	Seven Hills (Seattle)	Seven Hills (Seattle)	Eclipse (Monmouth, Oregon)	Orcas (Seattle)
2025	SmOAK (Oakland)	Seven Hills (Seattle)	Minnesota Superior (Minneapolis)	OAK Sparks (Oakland)	Minnesota Superior (Minneapolis)
2024	Philadelphia SEPDA (Philadelphia)	Downpour (Eugene, Oregon)	Nightfall (Dallas)	Seven Hills (Seattle)	Belly of the Beast! (Bay Area)
2023	Utah Storm (Salt Lake City)	Seven Hills (Seattle)	Seven Hills (Seattle)	Seven Hills (Seattle)	rATLers (Atlanta)
2022	Utah Storm (Salt Lake City)	Downpour (Eugene, Oregon)	Seven Hills (Seattle)	Minnesota Superior (Minneapolis)	Seven Hills (Seattle)
2021	Trainwreck (Independence, Oregon)	Downpour (Eugene, Oregon)	Pi+ (Lexington, Kentucky)	Utah Storm (Salt Lake City)	—N/a
2019	AFDC ATLiens (Atlanta)	TYUL Warhawks (Raleigh)	DiscNW Bankroll (Seattle)	Oregon Youth Ultimate Oregon Eruption! (Portland)	DiscNW Blossom (Seattle)
2019	BUDA (Boston)	Maine Ultimate Riptide (Portland)	Indiana Ultimate Foundation INcognito (Indianapolis)	DiscNW Horizon (Seattle)	AFDC rATLers (Atlanta)
2018	WAFC Foggy Bottom Boys (Washington, DC)	TYUL Warhawks (Raleigh)	POWERLINE (San Diego)	DiscNW Space Jam (Seattle)	Belle (Cincinnati)
2017	TYUL Triforce (Raleigh)	TYUL Warhawks (Raleigh)	Bay Area Disc Happy Cows (Bay Area)	DiscNW Oblivion (Seattle)	DiscNW Eclipse (Seattle)
2016	TYUL Triforce (Raleigh)	DiscNW Nimbus (Seattle)	WAFC Swing Vote (Washington, DC)	DiscNW Bonzai (Seattle)	DiscNW Hydra (Seattle)
2015	BUDA Open (Boston)	DiscNW Seattlesaurus (Seattle)	WAFC Swing Vote (Washington, DC)	DiscNW Olympus (Seattle)	DiscNW Echo (Seattle)
2014	TYUL Triforce (Raleigh)	DiscNW Cyclone (Seattle)	Oregon Flood (Corvallis)	DiscNW Doomsday (Seattle)	—N/a
2013	ATLiens (Atlanta)	DiscNW Rampage (Seattle)	BUDA YCC Mixed (Boston)	Seattle Dynasty (Seattle)	—N/a
2012	Minnesota Superior (Minneapolis)	DiscNW Rapture (Seattle)	BUDA YCC Mixed (Boston)	Seattle Rebellion (Seattle)	—N/a
2011	DiscNW Monstars (Seattle)	DiscNW Tune Squad (Seattle)	Bay Area Disc Happy Cows (Bay Area)	TYUL One Huck Wonders (Raleigh-Durham-Chapel Hill)	—N/a
2010	DeVYL (Philadelphia)	DiscNW (Seattle)	Bay Area Disc (Bay Area)	—N/a	—N/a
2009	DiscNW "L-Pod" (Seattle)	DiscNW (Seattle)	Skyline (Minnesota)	—N/a	—N/a
2008	DiscNW "Overcast" (Seattle)	DiscNW (Seattle)	Eugene	—N/a	—N/a
2007	DiscNW "Juggernaut" (Seattle)	DiscNW "Blackout" (Seattle)	I-20 (Atlanta)	—N/a	—N/a
2006	SEPDA (Philadelphia)	DiscNW "Blackout" (Seattle)	MOFO (Winnipeg)	—N/a	—N/a
2005	DiscNW (Seattle)	DiscNW (Seattle)	Nashville	—N/a	—N/a

=== High school regional championships ===
Year	(North)Eastern		Western		Central		Southern	
Year	Open	Girls	Open	Girls	Open	Girls	Open	Girls
2016	Amherst Regional High School	Amherst Regional High School	Roosevelt High School	Nathan Hale High School	Neuqua Valley High School	Holy Family Catholic High School	Carolina Friends School	HB Woodlawn High School
2015	Pennsbury High School	Amherst Regional High School	Roosevelt High School	Lakeside School	Hopkins High School	Neuqua Valley High School	Carolina Friends School	Paideia High School
2014	Masconomet Regional High School	Amherst Regional High School	Northwest School	Northwest School	Hopkins High School	Holy Family Catholic High School	Carolina Friends School	North Carolina Saga
2013	Lexington High School	Amherst Regional High School	South Eugene High School	Monarch High School	Holy Family Catholic High School	Holy Family Catholic High School	University School of Nashville	North Carolina Saga
2012	Amherst Regional High School	Amherst Regional High School	East High School	No Championship Held	Hopkins High School	Holy Family Catholic High School	University School of Nashville	YHB Girls
2011	Amherst Regional High School	Amherst Regional High School	Northwest School	Northwest School	—N/a	—N/a	—N/a	—N/a
2010	Amherst Regional High School	Amherst Regional High School	South Eugene High School	Northwest School	—N/a	—N/a	—N/a	—N/a
2009	Pennsbury High School	Paideia School	Hopkins High School	Nathan Hale	—N/a	—N/a	—N/a	—N/a
2008	Columbia High School	Paideia School	Lakeside School	Northwest School	—N/a	—N/a	—N/a	—N/a
2007	Pennsbury High School	Amherst Regional High School	Northwest School	Churchill High School	—N/a	—N/a	—N/a	—N/a
2006	Amherst HS Hurricanes	Amherst Regional High School	Northwest School	Nathan Hale	—N/a	—N/a	—N/a	—N/a
2005	Amherst HS Hurricanes	Amherst Regional High School	Northwest School	Nathan Hale	—N/a	—N/a	—N/a	—N/a

=== Youth championships ===
Year	Open	Girls
2004	Amherst HS Hurricanes	Yale Secondary Ultimate
2003	Amherst HS Hurricanes	Amherst HS Varsity
2002	Paideia HS Gruel	Amherst HS Varsity
2001	Paideia HS Gruel	Amherst HS Varsity
2000	Seattle MoHo	Amherst HS Varsity
1999	University School of Nashville Brutal Grassburn	Amherst HS Varsity
1998	Amherst HS	Stuyvesant HS

== The Callahan Award ==
The Callahan Award is an annual award given by The Callahan Award committee, with assistance from USA Ultimate, to the best male and female college ultimate players. In addition to honoring extraordinary physical talent and skills, the Callahan Award also honors sportsmanship and leadership. Each Open and Women's team can nominate a single player for the award. Beginning in 2000, players could also be nominated for the Callahan by USA Ultimate college regional coordinators.

The winners are selected through online balloting by other college ultimate players. The award is named after Henry Callahan, one of the early pioneers and ambassadors of ultimate. The Callahan Award was initially created by Charles Kerr and was first awarded in 1996.

=== Past Callahan winners ===
Year	Open	Women
2026	Zeke Thoreson (University of Colorado)	Mika Kurahashi (University of British Columbia)
2025	Dexter Clyburn (University of California-Berkeley)	Laura Blume (University of California-Santa Barbara)
2024	Aidan Downey (University of Georgia)	Jolie Krebs (SUNY-Binghamton)
2023	Justin Burnett (Emory University)	Abby Hecko (University of Washington)
2022	John Randolph (Brown University)	Dawn Culton (University of North Carolina)
2021	Azeez Adeyemi (Brown University)	Jasmine Childress (University of California-Santa Barbara)
2020	Michael Ing (University of Pittsburgh)	Anne Worth (University of North Carolina)
2019	Matt Gouchoe-Hanas (University of North Carolina)	Jack Verzuh (Dartmouth College)
2018	Gabe Hernandez (Stanford University)	Jackelyne Nguyen (University of California-Berkeley)
2017	John Stubbs (Harvard University)	Angela Zhu (Dartmouth College)
2016	Trent Dillon (University of Pittsburgh)	Marisa Rafter (University of California-Berkeley)
2015	Jonathan Nethercutt (University of North Carolina)	Alika Johnston (University of Virginia)
2014	Jimmy Mickle (University of Colorado)	Cassie Swafford (Ohio State University)
2013	Dylan Freechild (University of Oregon)	Claire Chastain (University of North Carolina-Wilmington)
2012	Nick Lance (Georgia Institute of Technology)	Paula Seville (University of Michigan)
2011	George Stubbs (Harvard University)	Leila Tunnell (University of North Carolina)
2010	Eli Friedman (University of Oregon)	Shannon O'Malley (University of Washington)
2009	Will Neff (University of Michigan)	Georgia Bosscher (University of Wisconsin–Madison)
2008	Joe Kershner (University of Arizona)	Courtney Kiesow (University of Wisconsin–Madison)
2007	Dan Heijmen (University of Wisconsin-Madison Hodags)	Anna 'Maddog' Nazarov (UCLA)
2006	Tim Gehret (University of Florida)	Alex Snyder (University of Colorado)
2005	Joshua "Zip" Ziperstein (Brown University)	Cara Crouch (University of Texas)
2004	Joshua "Richter" Ackley (University of Colorado)	Miranda Roth (Carleton College)
2003	Ben Wiggins (University of Oregon)	Chelsea Dengler (University of Oregon)
2002	Michael Zalisk (Tufts University)	Pauline Lauterbach (Brown University)
2001	Alex Nord (Carleton College)	Lindsay Goldsmith (Swarthmore College)
2000	Justin Safdie (Brown University)	Johanna Neumann (Tufts University)
1999	Fortunat Mueller (Brown University)	Jody Dozono (University of Oregon)
1998	Brian Harriford (Louisiana State University)	"AJ" Johnson (Stanford University)
1997	Jim Schoettler (Stanford University)	Dominique Fontenette (Stanford University)
1996	Keith Monohan (Oregon State University)	Val Kelly (University of Pennsylvania)

== The Donovan Award ==
The Donovan Award is named after the late Kelly Donovan and was made as a tribute to Kelly.

The Donovan Award will be awarded to one Women's and one Men's player in Division III who are selected by their peers. The ideal candidate for the award meets the following criteria:

1. Demonstrates an exceptional level of skill and athleticism on the field.
2. Upholds the principles of Spirit of the Game, equity, and fairness in their own actions, as well as holding teammates accountable to do the same.
3. Is a leader off the field, both on their team and in the greater ultimate community.

=== Past Donovan winners ===
Year	Men's	Women's
2026	Peter Mans (Middlebury College)	Maggie Brown (Wesleyan University)
2025	Daniel Snider (Bates College)	Zoe Costanza (Haverford/Bryn Mawr College)
2024	Will Brandt (St. Olaf College)	Keziah Wilde (Middlebury College)
2023	Oliver Kraft (Colorado College)	Tess Dolan (Wellesley College)
2022	Leo Sovell-Fernandez (Middlebury College)	Josie Ku (Wellesley College)
2021	Hunter Lang (University of Richmond)	Camille Goo (University of Puget Sound)
2020	Harris Cannon (University of Richmond)	Abby Cheng (Oberlin College)
2019	Alan Villanueva (Air Force Academy)	Josie Gillett (Bates College)
2018	Zachary Norrbom (University of Mary Washington)	Tamar Austin (Rensselaer Polytechnic Institute)
2017	Henry Babcock (University of Richmond)	Tessa Jones (Swarthmore College)

== Ultimate Hall of Fame ==
Source: Source:

=== Men ===
Class of	Inductee	Category
2004	Irv Kalb	Inaugural Class
2004	Tom "TK" Kennedy	Inaugural Class
2004	Dan "Stork" Roddick	Inaugural Class
2004	Larry Schindel	Inaugural Class
2005	Jon "JC" Cohn	Player
2005	Jim Herrick	Player
2005	Sholom "Eric" Simon	Contributor
2006	Tom "Timba" D'Urso	Player
2006	Steve Mooney	Player
2006	Robert "Nob" Rauch	Contributor
2007	Harvey Edwards	Player
2007	Dan Weiss	Player
2007	Brian Murphy	Contributor
2008	Frank Bono	Player
2008	John Schmechel	Player
2008	Carney Foy	Contributor
2009	Evan Roberts	Player
2009	Pat King	Player
2009	Andy Borinstein	Contributor
2010	David Barkan	Player
2010	Michael Glass	Player
2010	Jeremy Seeger	Player
2011	Kenneth Dobyns	Player
2011	Tom Heimann	Player
2011	Cliff Marhoefer	Player
2011	Mike O'Dowd	Player
2012	Keay Nakae	Player
2012	Dennis Warsen	Player
2013	Joey Giampino	Player
2013	Jim Ingebritsen	Player
2013	Christopher Van Holmes	Player
2014	Jim Parinella	Player
2015	Rich "Gags" Gallagher	Player
2015	Skip Kuhn	Player
2015	Billy Rodriguez	Player
2015	Bob "Bert" Sick	Player
2016	Stu Downs	Player
2016	Paul Greff	Player
2016	Pat "Bagger" Lee	Player
2016	Andrew Lugsdin	Player
2016	Randy Ricks	Player
2017	Dave Blau	Player
2017	Jeff Cruickshank	Player
2017	Steve Dugan	Player
2017	David "Buzz" Ellsworth	Player
2017	Mark Licata	Contributor
2018	Paul Brenner	Player
2018	Bob DeMan	Player
2018	Ian Hue	Player
2018	Greg Husak	Player
2018	Brian "Biscuit" Morris	Player
2018	Allan "Al Bob" Nichols	Player
2018	Michael Baccarini	Contributor
2019	Walter VanderSchraaf	Player
2019	Brian Dobyns	Contributor
2020	Andy Crews	Player
2020	Bob Lobel	Player
2020	Damien Scott	Player
2020	Mike Grant	Player
2021	Augie Kreivenas	Player
2021	David Boardman	Player
2021	Fortunat Mueller	Player
2021	Frank Revi	Contributor
2022	Mike Caldwell	Player
2022	Sam Chatterton-Kirchmeier	Player
2022	Mike Namkung	Player
2022	Alex Nord	Player
2022	Bart Watson	Player
2022	Scotty Conway	Mixed Division
2022	Joe Seidler	Contributor
2023	Beau Kittredge	Player
2023	Josh Markette	Player
2023	Jon Remucal	Player
2023	Chase Sparling-Beckley	Player
2023	Tyler Grant	Mixed Division
2023	Kevin Seiler	Mixed Division
2024	Robbie Cahill	Player
2024	Rick Geyer	Player
2024	Toby Hankins	Player
2024	Mauricio Matiz	Player
2024	Mark Orders	Player
2024	Dylan Tunnell	Player
2024	Josh Ziperstein	Player
2024	Steve Finn	Mixed Division
2024	Will Sutton	Mixed Division
2024	Will Deaver	Contributor
2024	Charles Kerr	Contributor
2024	Bob Pallares	Contributor
2024	Henry Thorne	Contributor
2025	John Hassell	Player
2025	Kurt Gibson	Player
2025	Michael Faris	Mixed Division
2025	Alex "Dutchy" Ghesquiere	Contributor
2025	Matty Tsang	Contributor
2026	Ashlin Joye	Player
2026	Jeff Graham	Player
2026	Mac Taylor	Player
2026	Josh ‘Shwa’ Hemmesch	Mixed Division
2026	James Hron	Mixed Division
2026	Sean Murray	Mixed Division
2026	Rob Baril	Contributors
2026	Rodney Jacobson	Contributors
2026	Kevin Leclaire	Contributors
2026	Titcomb siblings (Zahlen, Xtehn, Vehro)	Contributors

=== Women ===
Class of	Inductee	Category
2004	Suzanne Fields	Inaugural Class
2005	Kelly Green	Player
2005	Kathy Pufahl	Contributor
2006	Ann (Cohan) Orders	Player
2006	Heather Morris Raker	Player
2007	Christine Dunlap	Player
2008	Gloria Lust-Phillips	Player
2010	Peggy Hollinger	Player
2011	Wende (Coates) Pinz	Player
2012	Nancy Glass	Player
2012	Molly Goodwin	Player
2013	Christine O'Cleary	Player
2014	Liz Marino	Player
2015	Lori Van Holmes	Player
2016	Nicole "Sprout" Beck	Player
2016	Tiina Booth	Contributor
2016	Cindy Fisher	Contributor
2016	Jackie Watson Pierce	Player
2016	Cat Pittack	Player
2016	Christine "Wags" Wagner	Player
2016	Amy Wilbur	Player
2017	Leslie Calder	Player
2017	Pam Kraus	Player
2017	Caryn Lucido	Player
2017	Mary Lowry	Contributor
2018	Dominique Fontenette	Player
2018	Angela Lin	Player
2018	Tina McDowell	Player
2018	Joanie Merrill	Player
2018	Michele Pezzolli	Player
2019	Allison Boyd	Player
2019	Lori Parham Ewald	Player
2019	Deb (Cussen) Scheibe	Player
2020	Jody Dozono	Player
2020	Vivian Zayas	Player
2020	VY Chow	Player
2021	Gwen Ambler	Player
2021	Katherine Forth	Player
2021	Jennifer "JD" Donnelly	Contributor
2021	Mary Louise Mahoney Cohn	Contributor
2022	Cara Crouch	Player
2022	Anja Haman	Player
2022	Miranda Roth Knowles	Player
2022	Alex Snyder	Player
2022	Alicia White	Player
2022	Emily Smith-Wilson	Mixed Division
2022	Joey Gray	Contributor Mix Division
2023	Enessa Janes	Player
2023	Chelsea Putnam	Player
2023	Nancy Sun	Player
2023	Alyson Walker	Player
2023	Kirsten Unfried Zalisk	Player
2023	Mary Burke	Mixed Division
2023	Kendra Frederick	Mixed Division
2024	Liz Duffy	Player
2024	Jenny Fey	Player
2024	Leslie Grayson	Player
2024	Sarah Griffith	Player
2024	Susan Hawkins	Player
2024	Anna Nazarov	Player
2024	Liz Phillips	Player
2024	DeDe Kobylarz Singer	Player
2024	Raha Mozaffari	Mixed Division
2024	Skyla Sisco	Mixed Division
2024	Michelle Ng	Contributors
2024	Lynne Nolan	Contributors
2025	Carolyn Finney	Player
2025	Cree Howard	Player
2025	Georgia (Bosscher) Shriwise	Player
2025	Kaela Helton	Player
2025	Sandy Jorgensen	Player
2025	Robin Davis	Contributor
2026	Amber Sinicrope	Player
2026	Anne (Mercier) Boulanger	Player
2026	Octavia ‘Opi’ Payne	Player
2026	Rohre Titcomb	Player
2026	Leila Tunnell	Player
2026	Alicia Carr	Mixed Division
2026	Titcomb siblings (Rohre and Qxhna)	Contributors
2026	Adriana Withers	Contributors

=== Special Merit ===
Class of	Inductee	Notes
2004	The "80 Mold" Disc	Wham-O's 165 gram World Class flying disc introduced in January 1977 and marked a new era of competitive play
2005	The "Founders"	Joel Silver, Bernard "Buzzy" Hellring, Jonathan "Jonny" Hines
2011	The "Discraft Ultra-Star" Disc	With Jim Kenner
2014	The "Johnny Appleseeds"	Critical core of 29 individuals who were responsible for ultimate's germination during the critical years up through 1974
2021	Early Photographers and Videographers	Eight individuals that provided media coverage of early regional, national, and international events.

== See also ==
- List of Ultimate teams
- Disc Northwest
- Ultimate Canada
- Ken Westerfield
- Flying disc games
- Ultimate (sport)
