= 2025 World Beach Ultimate Championships =

- Host city: Portimão
- Organizer: WFDF
- Dates: 16–22 November

The 2025 World Beach Ultimate Championships was the 7th edition of the international beach ultimate competition organized by World Flying Disc Federation. They were held in Portimão, Portugal, from 16 to 22 November 2025. There were ten division events, included women's and mixed grand masters debut in the first time.

== Medal summary ==
Event	Gold	Silver	Bronze
Open	United States	Belgium	France
Women's	United States	Netherlands	France
Mixed	Germany	Australia	Czech Republic
Open masters	United States	Canada	Spain
Women's masters	Canada	United States	Spain
Mixed masters	United States	Spain	Canada
Open grand masters	United States	Germany	United Kingdom
Women's grand masters	United States	Canada	Denmark
Mixed grand masters	United States	Australia	Canada
Open great grand masters	Canada	United States	United Kingdom

== Medal table ==
* Host nation (Portugal)

Rank	Nation	Gold	Silver	Bronze	Total
1	United States	7	2	0	9
2	Canada	2	2	2	6
3	Germany	1	1	0	2
4	Australia	0	2	0	2
5	Spain	0	1	2	3
6	Belgium	0	1	0	1
6	Netherlands	0	1	0	1
8	France	0	0	2	2
8	Great Britain	0	0	2	2
10	Czech Republic	0	0	1	1
10	Denmark	0	0	1	1
Totals (11 entries)		10	10	10	30
