= Harry Callahan =

Harry Callahan may refer to:

- Harry Callahan (photographer) (1912–1999), American photographer
- Harry Callahan (character) or Dirty Harry, as fictional police detective portrayed by Clint Eastwood

== See also ==
- Henry Callahan (1957–1982), American sportsman
