= List of ultimate frisbee organizations =

This is a list of organizations related to the sport of Ultimate.

== Ultimate ==
Ultimate is a type of sports competition using a Frisbee type of flying disc, which is flown between different players.

There are several different associations that organise such competitions, with different aims and in different regions.

== Players associations ==
Players associations are the governing bodies of the sport, tied to a specific region (global, national, or state/regional). These are typically independent of professional players leagues like the AUDL or PUL.

=== Global ===
==== World Flying Disc Federation ====
Founded in 1985, the World Flying Disc Federation (WFDF) oversees the sport globally. In May 2013, under the leadership of Robert L. "Nob" Rauch, the WFDF was granted provisional recognition by the International Olympic Committee and is a member of the Association of IOC Recognised International Sports Federations.

=== United States ===
==== National governing bodies ====
- USA Ultimate (USAU)

==== Regional organizational bodies ====
- Diego Ultimate Disc Experience (DUDE) - San Diego, California

== Camps and training ==
=== American Ultimate Academy ===
The American Ultimate Academy (AUA) was founded in 2017 and launched its inaugural overnight summer camp in 2018. Based in Washington, DC AUA hosts camps and leagues with a focus on growing the sport through youth development.

=== NUTC ===
The National Ultimate Training Camp (NUTC) was launched in 2001 by Amherst Leisure Services and Tiina Booth. NUTC is the oldest overnight summer camp for youth ultimate players and now has camp sessions for teams and coaches as well as individual players. NUTC also presents the weekly college power rankings through Ultiworld.

== Equity organizations ==
=== The Upwind Institute ===
The Upwind Institute is the next generation of Upwind Ultimate LLC. The Institute, commonly known as Upwind, has a mission to research, create, and disseminate policies in sports that promote equity. They acknowledge that some identities have received less access to opportunity, resources, and power in sports in the past, and believe that to move towards equity in sports, we need to take on the challenging work of reflection, recognition, and commitment to putting actions behind our theories. One of their projects was the popular #HuckYes campaign aimed at promoting awareness of the need for consent in the sporting community.

== Tournament organizers ==
=== Without Limits ===
Without Limits is a non-profit organization founded by Sara Jacobi and Michelle Ng in the Summer of 2010. The organization was created to foster relationships within the women’s ultimate community at the youth, college, and club levels, as well as promote and further the growth and development of the women’s division. In 2010 Without Limits produced the College Women's Ultimate Resource Manual. In 2018 Without Limits produced the 2nd Edition of the College Women's Ultimate Resource Manual.
