= Anna Nazarov =

American Frisbee Player

Anna "Maddog" Nazarov
Personal information
- National team: United States of America
- Born: November 20, 1984 (age 41) Arkhangelsk, Russia
- Education: University of California at Los Angeles (UCLA)

Sport
- University team: University of California at Los Angeles (UCLA) Bruin Ladies Ultimate (BLU)
- Club: San Francisco Bay Area Fury (current); San Francisco Blackbird; San Francisco Zeitgeist; San Francisco Skyline

Anna Nazarov is an American ultimate player, best known for playing with UCLA Bruin Ladies Ultimate, San Francisco Fury, and multiple USA National Teams. Nazarov has many on-field strengths, but particularly notable are her throwing prowess and ability to generate blocks.

She has also co-authored an academic paper on the epidemiology of injuries to college ultimate players.

== Ultimate career ==
Nazarov played ultimate at the University of California at Los Angeles, joining the inaugural women's team in the fall of 2003, and going on to win the Callahan Award in 2007. She helped lead Bruins Ladies Ultimate (BLU) to a finals appearance in the 2006 College Championships, where they fell to Stanford Superfly after defeating University of British Columbia in the quarterfinals and University of Colorado Boulder in the semifinals.

Nazarov played with San Francisco Blackbird in 2011, winning her first club title that season. In 2012, she joined San Francisco Fury, with whom she would win titles in 2012, 2017, 2018, and 2021. She captained Fury during the 2016 and 2017 seasons. In the 2014 and 2016 seasons, she was named to Ultiworld's all-club women's first team.

Nazarov has played for multiple USA National Teams. She won gold on the 2013 World Games Team (as an alternate) in Cali, Colombia, gold on the 2015 WCBU Women's Team in Dubai, UAE, gold on the 2016 WUGC Women's Team in London, England, gold on the 2017 World Games team in Wroclaw, Poland, and gold on the 2022 World Games Team (as an alternate) in Birmingham, Alabama. She was also named to the 2020 USA women's national team, which was set to compete in the 2020 World Ultimate and Guts Championships in the Netherlands, but was ultimately cancelled due to Covid-19.

She was the winner of the Kathy Pufahl Spirit Award in 2016. This award is given annually to a player "who has exhibited personal responsibility, integrity and selfless contribution to ultimate, combined with a high standard of playing ability." Nominees for this award are nominated by their club teams, and the winner is determined by a vote of teams playing at the National Championships.

She has been coaching in the women's ultimate program at the University of California, Berkeley since 2015.

== Honors ==
- Callahan Award Winner 2007
- USAU National Champion 2011, 2012, 2017, 2018, 2021
- World Games 1st Place 2013, 2017, 2021
- WUGC 1st Place 2016, selected to 2020 team (cancelled due to Covid)
- WCBU 1st Place 2015
- Ultiworld All-Club Women's Team: 1st Team 2014, 2016, 2nd Team 2015
