= List of Ultimate frisbee teams =

This is a list of ultimate frisbee teams.

== Ultimate Frisbee Association teams ==
=== East ===
- Boston Glory – Boston, Massachusetts
- Washington Breeze – Washington, D.C.
- Montreal Royal – Montreal, Quebec
- New York City Empire – New York City, New York
- Philadelphia Phoenix – Philadelphia, Pennsylvania
- Toronto Rush – Toronto, Ontario

=== South ===
- Atlanta Hustle – Atlanta, Georgia
- Austin Sol – Austin, Texas
- Charlotte Flyers – Charlotte, North Carolina
- Houston Havoc – Houston, Texas
- Los Angeles Aviators – Los Angeles, California
- San Diego Growlers – San Diego, California

=== Central ===
- Chicago Union – Chicago, Illinois
- Detroit Mechanix – Detroit, Michigan
- Indianapolis AlleyCats – Indianapolis, Indiana
- Madison Radicals – Madison, Wisconsin
- Minneapolis Wind Chill – Minneapolis, Minnesota
- Pittsburgh Thunderbirds – Pittsburgh, Pennsylvania

=== West ===
- Denver Summit – Denver, Colorado
- Oakland Spiders – Oakland, California
- Portland Steel – Portland, Oregon
- Salt Lake City Shred – Salt Lake City, Utah
- Seattle Cascades – Seattle, Washington
- Las Vegas Bighorns – Las Vegas, Nevada

== Premier Ultimate League teams ==
=== North ===
- Indianapolis Red – Indianapolis
- Milwaukee Monarchs – Milwaukee, Wisconsin
- Minneapolis Strike – Minneapolis, Minnesota
- New Jersey Gridlock – New Jersey
- Philadelphia Surge – Philadelphia
- New York Stars – New York

=== South ===
- Atlanta Soul – Atlanta
- Austin Torch – Austin, Texas
- Washington Shadow – Washington, D.C.
- Los Angeles Astra – Los Angeles
- Nashville Nightshade – Nashville, TN
- Charlotte Radiance – Charlotte, North Carolina

== Western Ultimate League teams ==
- Phoenix Sidewinders – Phoenix, Arizona
- San Francisco Falcons – San Francisco
- Denver Alpenglow – Denver
- Portland Soar – Portland, Oregon
- San Diego Super Bloom – San Diego
- Seattle Tempest – Seattle
- Salt Lake City Wild – Salt Lake City, Utah

== North American men's teams ==
=== Northeast ===
- Bruises – Andover, Massachusetts
- Chuck Wagon – Burlington, Vermont
- Colt – Newington, Connecticut
- GOAT – Toronto
- New Jersey Cyclones – New Jersey
- Clockers – Ashland, Massachusetts
- Deathsquad – Needham, Massachusetts
- Ironside – Boston
- Jerk Factory – New Brunswick and Nova Scotia
- Mad House – Halifax, Nova Scotia
- Man Up – Massapequa, New York
- Maverick – Ontario
- Mephisto – Montreal, Quebec
- Overcast – Syracuse, New York
- Phoenix – Ottawa, Ontario
- PoNY – New York City
- Projet P – Québec
- Red Circus – Halifax, Nova Scotia
- Ring Spinners – New York City
- Red Tide – Portland, Maine
- Run Silent Run Deep – Boston
- Smell My Mule – Ottawa, Ontario
- Juggalos Against Illuminati Leadership – Somerville, Massachusetts
- Big Wrench – Medford, Massachusetts
- Ubuntu – Boston
- Fully Torqued – Upstate New York

=== Mid-Atlantic ===
- JAWN – Philadelphia
- Southpaw – Philadelphia and New Jersey
- Patrol – Philadelphia
- Citywide Special – Philadelphia
- Ring of Fire – Raleigh, North Carolina
- Truck Stop – Washington, D.C.
- John Doe – Washington, D.C.
- Temper – Pittsburgh
- Capitol Punishment – Washington, D.C.
- Brickhouse – Raleigh, North Carolina
- Olympus Moans – Edinboro, Pennsylvania
- Bear Proof – Harrisburg, Pennsylvania
- F&Moose – Millersville, Pennsylvania
- Ultimatum – Richmond, Virginia
- Medicine Men – Baltimore
- Garden State Ultimate – Princeton, New Jersey
- Colorblind – New Brunswick, New Jersey
- Warriors – North Carolina
- Burgh – Pittsburgh
- Pittsburgh Iron Man Ultimate – Pittsburgh
- Roots of Rythmn – Yardley, Pennsylvania
- Cannibal – Raleigh, North Carolina
- Squires – Richmond, Virginia
- Wendigo – Washington, D.C.
- Town Hall Stars – Washington, D.C.
- Oakland Ultimate – Pittsburgh
- Rebels – Haddonfield, New Jersey

=== Southeast ===
- Tanasi – Knoxville, Tennessee
- BaNC – Charlotte, North Carolina
- Lost Boys – Columbia, South Carolina
- Southern Hospitality Tuscaloosa, Alabama
- Bullet- Macon, Georgia
- Hammer Bros. – Slidell, Louisiana
- Abita (Affiliates) – Baton Rouge, Louisiana
- Shotgun – New Orleans
- Vicious Cycle – Gainesville, Florida
- UpRoar – Tampa, Florida
- Tampa Tyranny – Tampa, Florida
- Florida United – Orlampahasseeville, Florida
- Chain Lightning – Atlanta
- El Diablo – Charleston, South Carolina and Savannah, Georgia
- Omen – Orlando, Florida
- Shrimp Boat Tallahassee, Florida
- Deep Fried – Jackson, Mississippi
- Freaks Uv Nature – Huntsville, Alabama
- Cartel – Miami
- SMOKESHACK – Georgia and South Carolina
- Dune Cats – Athens, Georgia
- Voodoo – Knoxville, Tennessee

=== North Central ===
- Auxiliary – Quad Cities
- Big River – St. Louis
- Bonehorn – Nebraska
- Butter – Twin Cities, Minnesota
- Climax – Minneapolis
- Dingwop – Duluth, Minnesota
- DIRT – Minneapolis
- General Strike – Winnipeg, Manitoba
- Gnarwhal – Des Moines, Iowa
- Hippie Mafia – Milwaukee
- H1N1 – Milwaukee, Wisconsin
- Mad Men – Madison, Wisconsin
- Rebel Madness – Bloomington, Minnesota
- Rubicon Rapids – Rubicon, Wisconsin
- Prairie Fire – Kansas City, Kansas
- Shinigami – Minneapolis
- Illusion – Iowa City, Iowa
- Sub-Zero – Minneapolis
- UFO – Oshkosh, Wisconsin
- Twin Cities Imperial – Twin Cities, Minnesota
- NorthStar HOUSE United – Southeastern Wisconsin
- Zoboomafoo – Madison, Wisconsin
- Conspiracy Theory – Madison, Wisconsin

=== Great Lakes ===
- Beachfront Property – Chicago
- Black Market Ultimate – Chicago
- Black Lung – Lexington, Kentucky
- Enigma – Dayton, Ohio
- FC Champaign – Champaign, Illinois
- Haymaker – Chicago
- Lake Effect – Cleveland
- Joyce – Columbus, Ohio
- Jurassic Shark – Toledo, Ohio
- Kentucky Flying Circus – Lexington, Kentucky
- Machine – Chicago
- Madcow – Columbus, Ohio
- Natives – Chicago
- Ruckus – Indianapolis
- Salvage – Chicago
- Skeetpocalypse – Bloomington, Indiana
- Spin-Itch – Rockford, Illinois
- Black Penguins – Bourbonnais, Illinois

=== South Central ===
- Johnny Bravo – Denver
- Inception – Denver
- ISO Atmo – Boulder, Colorado
- Choice City Hops – Fort Collins, Colorado
- Doublewide – Austin, Texas
- H.I.P. – Austin and Houston
- Riverside – Austin, Texas
- Crude – Dallas
- Plex – Dallas
- Space City – Houston
- Rage – San Antonio
- Abduction – Conway, Arkansas
- Utah Sooners – Utah
- Texas Thunder – San Antonio
- Flying Squirrels – Conway, Arkansas
- Dreadnought – Fayetteville, Arkansas
- Rawhide – Tulsa, Oklahoma
- Supercell – Norman, Oklahoma

=== Northwest ===
- Blackfish – Vancouver, British Columbia
- Furious George – Vancouver, British Columbia
- Warchild – Boise, Idaho
- Hippos – Oregon
- The Ghosts – Calgary, Alberta
- Rhino – Portland, Oregon
- Sockeye – Seattle
- Emerald City Ultimate – Seattle
- Voodoo – Seattle
- Ghost Train – Seattle
- SeaKing – Seattle
- Evergreen – Seattle
- Phantoms- Calgary, Alberta
- The Killjoys – Orem, Utah
- PowderHogs – Salt Lake City, Utah
- Refinery – Vancouver, British Columbia

=== Southwest ===
- Air Show – San Diego
- Anchor – Oakland, California
- Battery – San Francisco
- Brawl – Phoenix, Arizona
- Condors – Santa Barbara, California
- DOGGPOUND – Los Angeles
- Green River Swordfish – Davis, California
- Journeymen – Sunnyvale, California
- OAT – Livermore, California
- Renegade – Los Angeles
- Revolver – San Francisco
- San Diego Streetgang – San Diego
- Drought – Phoenix, Arizona
- Sundowners – Santa Barbara, California

== North American women's teams ==
=== Northeast ===
- Baywatch – Connecticut
- Brooklyn Book Club – New York City
- Brute Squad – Cambridge, Massachusetts
- Capitals – Toronto and Ottawa, Ontario
- Dino – New York City
- Frolic – Portland, Maine
- HOPE – Providence, Rhode Island
- IncogniTO – Toronto, Ontario
- Vice – Boston
- QUB – Quebec City, Quebec
- Roc Paper Scissors – Rochester, New York
- Salty – Halifax, Nova Scotia
- Siege – Boston
- Stella – Ottawa, Ontario
- Storm – Montreal, Quebec
- Sugar Shack – Burlington, Vermont
- Bent – New York City
- PPF – Waterloo, Ontario
- Starling — Northampton, Massachusetts

=== Mid-Atlantic ===
- Agency – Washington, D.C.
- Broad City – Philadelphia
- Grit – Washington, D.C.
- Incline- Pittsburgh
- Parcha- Pittsburgh
- Pickup Lines – Washington, D.C.
- Pine Baroness – Princeton, New Jersey
- Scandal – Washington, D.C.
- Suffrage – Washington, D.C.
- Virginia Rebellion – Richmond, Virginia

=== Southeast ===
- Fiasco – Miami
- Laika – Huntsville, Alabama
- Outbreak – Atlanta
- Ozone – Atlanta
- Phoenix – Raleigh, North Carolina
- Steel – Birmingham, Alabama
- Tabby Rosa – Florida
- Shiver (formerly Taco Truck) – Raleigh, North Carolina
- Queen Cake – New Orleans

=== South Central ===
- Showdown – Texas
- Inferno – Houston
- Maeve – Dallas and Fort Worth, Texas
- Temptress – Dallas and Fort Worth, Texas
- Flying Squirrels – Conway, Arkansas
- Savage Skies – Siloam Springs, Arkansas
- Box – Denver
- Molly Brown – Denver
- Jackwagon – Denver

=== North Central ===
- Pop – Minneapolis, Minnesota
- Crackle – Minneapolis, Minnesota
- Cold Cuts – Minneapolis, Minnesota
- Fusion – Winnipeg, Manitoba
- Heist – Madison, Wisconsin
- MystiKuE – Milwaukee, Wisconsin
- Wicked – Kansas City, Kansas

=== Great Lakes ===
- Autonomous – Ann Arbor, Michigan
- Dish – Chicago
- Helix – Chicago
- Nemesis – Chicago
- Notorious C.L.E. – Cleveland
- Rival – Columbus, Ohio and Ann Arbor, Michigan
- Rogue – Indianapolis
- Sureshot – Cincinnati

=== Northwest ===
- Riot – Seattle
- Underground – Seattle
- Seattle Soul – Seattle
- Prime – Vancouver, British Columbia
- Traffic – Vancouver, British Columbia
- Zephyr – Vancouver, British Columbia
- Koi – Vancouver, British Columbia (formerly Wendigo)
- Schwa – Portland, Oregon
- Viva – Seattle

=== Southwest ===
- 2nd Wave -Bay Area, California
- Deadly Viper Assassination Squad – Oakland, California
- FAB- Oakland, California
- Fury – San Francisco
- LOL – Oakland California
- Nightlock – San Francisco
- Rampage – Los Angeles
- Reign – Los Angeles
- Tempo – Palo Alto, California
- Ultraviolet – Bay Area, California
- Venom- Tucson, Arizona
- Viva – Los Angeles
- Wildfire – San Diego

== North American mixed teams ==
=== Northeast ===
- Funk – Hudson Valley, New York
- 7th Wheel – Boston, Massachusetts
- Ballometrics – Boston, Massachusetts
- Bashing Pinatas – Albany, New York
- BLU – Westport, Connecticut
- Darkwing – Mansfield, Massachusetts
- Destructors – Albany, New York
- District 5 – New Haven, Connecticut
- Weymouth XC – Boston, Massachusetts
- Flowchart – Somerville, Massachusetts
- The Ghosts – Boston, Massachusetts
- Gratuitous – Dover, New Hampshire
- Haos – Boston, Massachusetts
- Hellgate Ultimate – Queens, New York
- Jiggle the Handle – Northampton, Massachusetts
- Kung Fu Grip – Rochester, New York
- Lake Effect – Buffalo, New York
- Last Call – New York, New York
- Levitation Holmes – New York, New York
- Lions Ultimate – Boston, Massachusetts
- Mako – New Haven, Connecticut
- Manhattan Project – New York, New York
- Mars Meets Venus – Toronto, Ontario
- Mixed Nuts – Boston, Massachusetts
- Mogwai – Portland, Maine
- MUTT – Moncton, New Brunswick
- MuD – Guelph, Ontario
- Surge – Kingston, Ontario
- Muff 'N Men – Pittsburgh, Pennsylvania
- No Grass For You – New York, New York
- ONYX – Quebec, Quebec
- Odyssee – Montreal, Quebec
- Pleasure Town – Boston, Massachusetts
- Puppet Regime – New York, New York
- Revolution – New York, New York
- RUT – Burlington, VT
- Slow White – Boston, Massachusetts
- Spawn – Fredericton, New Brunswick
- S.S. ARG – Portland, Maine
- Townies – Ithaca, New York
- Union – Toronto, Ontario
- Unlimited Swipes – New York, New York
- Wild Card – Lexington, Massachusetts
- Whalers – Norwalk, Connecticut
- Zazzle – Moncton, New Brunswick
- Zazzleicious – Moncton, New Brunswick
- Zen – Toronto, Ontario

=== Mid-Atlantic ===
- AMP – Philadelphia
- American Hyperbole – Baltimore
- Ant Madness – Arlington County, Virginia
- Backfire – Raleigh, North Carolina
- Bitmap- Philadelphi
- Blueprint – New Jersey
- Boone Shakalaka – Boone, North Carolina
- Death by Jubilee – Washington, D.C.
- Dirty People – Newark, Delaware
- GSP – North New Jersey
- Hooray for Coed! – State College, Pennsylvania
- Hustlers – Baltimore
- Jughandle – Princeton, New Jersey
- Key Party – Lancaster, Pennsylvania
- Legion – Lynchburg, Virginia
- Loco – West Chester, Pennsylvania
- Mother Huckers – Fredericksburg, Virginia
- Alloy – Pittsburgh
- Rail Yard – Roanoke, Virginia
- Renegade – Washington, D.C.
- Seven Minutes in Heaven – Richmond, Virginia
- Sidecar – Baltimore
- Sparkle Ponies – Washington, D.C.
- Virginia Slims – Charlottesville, Virginia

=== Southeast ===
- Bucket – Atlanta
- Burn Cycle – Tallahassee, Florida
- Carolina Reign – Piedmont Triad, NC
- Cahoots – Asheville, North Carolina
- Chewbacca Defense – Austin, Texas
- Cosa Nostra – Austin, Texas
- Death Throw – Denton, Texas
- Deliverance – Knoxville, Tennessee
- En Fuego – San Antonio, Texas
- Flash Flood – Houston
- Guillermo y Compania – Nashville, Tennessee
- Hinoki – Durham, North Carolina
- Hucking Dead – Jacksonville, Florida
- KoD – Pembroke Pines, Florida
- Naughty Pine – Carrboro, North Carolina
- Public Enemy – Fort Worth, Texas
- Risky Business – Dallas
- Rival – Atlanta, Georgia
- Swing State – Orlando, Florida
- TAU – Winston-Salem, North Carolina
- wHagonweel – Raleigh, North Carolina

=== Great Lakes ===
- Goose Lee – Cincinnati
- Steamboat – Cincinnati
- Santa Maria – Columbus, Ohio
- Prion – Champaign-Urbana, Illinois
- Handlebar – Ann Arbor, Michigan
- Omerta – Chicago
- Interrobang – Indianapolis
- The Abusement Park – South Bend, Indiana
- Jabba – Chicago
- ELevate – Chicago
- Stack Cats – Chicago
- Liquid Hustle – Indianapolis, Indiana
- Pizza Party! – Chicago, Illinois
- Carlos Danger – Indianapolis, Indiana
- Snow Day – Grand Rapids, Michigan
- Fighting Kirbys – Dayton, Ohio
- Moonshine – Lexington, Kentucky
- Fifth Element – Louisville, KY
- North Coast Disc Co. – Cleveland, Ohio
- Bro Kittens – Athens, Ohio
- Mishigami – East Lansing, Michigan

=== North Central ===
- Drag'n Thrust – Minneapolis/St. Paul, Minnesota
- Chad Larson Experience – Ames, Iowa
- Thoroughbred – St. Louis, Missouri
- SWARM – Winnipeg, Manitoba
- MOFO – Winnipeg, Manitoba
- Minnesota Star Power – Minneapolis, Minnesota
- Mojo Jojo – Minneapolis, Minnesota
- Bird – Minneapolis, Minnesota
- No Touching! – Minneapolis, Minnesota
- Pushovers – Minneapolis, Minnesota
- Troy's Bucket – Springfield, Missouri
- Cream City Crooks – Milwaukee, Wisconsin
- Northern Comfort – Milwaukee, Wisconsin
- Boomtown Pandas – Madison, Wisconsin
- Mad Udderburn – Madison, Wisconsin
- Mastodon – Madison, Wisconsin
- Mousetrap – Madison, Wisconsin
- Madison United Mixed Ultimate – Madison, Wisconsin

=== Northwest ===
- Birdfruit – Seattle, Washington
- Lochsa – Boise, Idaho
- Bulleit Train – Seattle, Washington
- Mental Toss Flycoons – Missoula, Montana
- D'oh! – Seattle, Washington
- Shazam – Seattle, Washington
- Moonshine – Seattle, Washington
- Rainmakers – Tacoma, Washington
- Guard, Seize Them! – Seattle, Washington
- O'School – Olympia, Washington
- Eats, Throws, Leaves – Seattle, Washington
- Seattle Mixtape – Seattle, Washington
- BFG – Seattle, Washington
- Lights Out – Seattle, Washington

=== South Central ===
- shame. – Fort Collins, Colorado
- The Strangers – Westminster, Colorado
- Love Tractor – Denver, Colorado
- Mesteno – Denver, Colorado
- Impact – Wichita, Kansas

=== Southwest ===
- ABBQ – San Francisco, California
- Birds of Paradise – San Diego, California
- Blackbird – San Francisco, California
- Buckwild – Sacramento, California
- BW Ultimate – Sunnyvale, California
- California Burrito – San Diego, California
- Classy – San Francisco, California
- Cutthroat – Reno, Nevada
- Donuts – Bay Area, California
- Family Style – Los Angeles, California
- Fear and Loathing – Las Vegas, Nevada
- Firefly – San Francisco, California
- Instant Karma – Tucson, Arizona
- Long Beach Legacy – Long Beach, California
- Lotus – Los Angeles, California
- Mischief – San Francisco, California
- Pivot – Phoenix, Arizona
- Platypi – Chico, California
- Polar Bears – San Francisco, California
- Robot – Santa Barbara, California
- Rogue – Tucson, Arizona
- Rubix – Phoenix, Arizona
- Spoiler Alert – Los Angeles, California
- Superstition – Phoenix, Arizona

== USA Masters ==
USA Ultimate defines Masters-eligible players as men 33 and over as well as women 30 and over as of December 31 of the current year.

=== Northeast ===
- GLUM – Ottawa, Ontario, Canada

=== Mid-Atlantic ===
- Boneyard – Raleigh-Durham, North Carolina
- Black Cans & Highlands – Washington, D.C.
- Trainwreck – Raleigh-Durham, North Carolina

=== South ===
- Reckon – Atlanta/Tennessee
- Woolly Mammoth – Florida
- Tejas – Texas
- Rust – Birmingham, Alabama

=== Central ===
- Surly – Twin Cities, Minnesota
- Wasted Talent – Chicago, Illinois
- Old Style – Madison, Wisconsin

=== Northwest ===
- Burnside – Portland, Oregon
- FIGJAM – Calgary, Alberta, Canada

=== Southwest ===
- Crawl – Arizona
- Johnny Encore – Boulder/Denver, Colorado
- Masters of Disc-guise – Bay Area, CA
- Old Stones – San Diego, CA

== Europe ==
=== Austria ===
- Stack Overflow – Hagenberg

=== Belgium ===
- Adrenaline – Charleroi
- KUFC – Kortrijk
- FreezzzBeezzz – Brugge
- JetSet – Leuven
- Gentle – Ghent
- De Karolingers – Knokke-Heist
- Flywin – Namur
- XLR8RS – Brussels
- Mooncatchers – Brussels
- Ouftimate – Liège
- BlackBirds – Limal - La Hulpe
- Diabolic Heaven – Hasselt
- Stoemps – Brussels
- PUF – Nazareth-De Pinte

=== Bosnia and Herzegovina ===
- Ultimate Frisbee ZMAJ – Zvornik
- Ultimate Frisbee Club Lukavac – Lukavac
- Nezgodne nektarine – Banja Luka

=== Denmark ===
- KFK – Copenhagen
- Copenhagen Hucks – Copenhagen
- Dinosaurs – Aalborg
- AUC Mojn – Aabenraa
- Ragnarok – Copenhagen
- Disc Control – Tørring

=== England ===
- Alphabet Soup – London
- ABH – London
- Airwolf – Wolverhampton, UK
- Aye-Aye Ultimate – Norwich
- Bath Ultimate – Bath
- Birmingham Ultimate – Birmingham
- Black Sheep – Manchester
- Blue Arse Flies – Evesham
- The Bournemouth Ultimatum – Bournemouth
- Brighton Panthers – Brighton
- Brighton Ultimate – Brighton
- Camden Ultimate – London
- Chevron Action Flash – Manchester
- Clapham – London
- Cloud City Ultimate – London
- Curve – London
- Devon – Devon
- DUF – Durham University
- Didsbury Ultimate Frisbee For Amateurs – Manchester
- East Midlands Open – East Midlands
- Falmouth Community Ultimate – Cornwall
- Fire of London – London
- Fish – Lancaster
- Flyght Club – East Midlands
- Flying Aces – Stafford
- Fully-Charged – Portsmouth / London
- Halcyon – Manchester
- High Fliers – Southampton
- HS Beavers – London School of Economics
- Iceni – London
- Jusdisc League – London
- Kapow! – London, UK
- Keele Koogaz – Keele, UK
- Kent Touch This – Canterbury, UK
- Kernow Ultimate – Cornwall, UK
- Leeds Ultimate – Leeds, UK
- Leeds University Ultimate – Leeds, UK
- Hawks Ultimate – Brighton, UK
- Mythago – University of Bristol, UK
- OW! – University of Oxford, UK
- Reading Ultimate – Reading, UK
- Red – Leicester, UK
- Release – Southampton, UK
- The Saints – Teesside, UK
- KCL Thrown – King's College London, UK
- Thundering Herd – London, UK
- Salford Chucks – Salford, UK
- Shake & Bake – Exeter, UK
- Shakedown – Exeter, UK
- St Austell Ultimate – Cornwall, UK
- Steal – Sheffield, UK
- Strange Blue – Cambridge, UK
- STUFT – Stoke, UK
- Team Shark – Oxford, UK
- Tooting Tigers – South London, UK
- uBu – University of Birmingham, UK
- University of Nottingham Ultimate – University of Nottingham, UK
- Vision – Merseyside, UK
- Warwick Bears – University of Warwick, UK
- YOpen Ultimate – York, UK
- York Ultimate – York, UK
- Zoo – London, UK

=== Finland ===
- Disquitos – Oulu, Finland
- Polli – Espoo, Finland
- Karhukopla – Espoo, Finland
- LeKi – Lempäälä, Finland
- Sipoo Odd Stars SOS – Sipoo, Finland
- Saints – Vaasa, Finland
- Team – Helsinki, Finland
- Terror – Turku, Finland
- UFO – Tampere, Finland

=== France ===
- Ah Ouh Puc – Paris, France
- Contact Disc Club – Les Brouzils, France
- Euskadisk – Biarritz, France
- Friselis – Versailles, France
- Krampouz – Lannion, France
- Mr Friz – Rennes, France
- Frisbeurs Nantais – Nantes, France
- Moustix – Lyon, France
- Nantchester United – Nantes, France
- Revolution'air – Paris, France
- Ultimate Club Vesontio – Friz'Bisontins (Besançon, France)
- ZIGGLES – Antibes, France

=== Greece ===
- Flying Moussakats – Athens, Greece
  - Ultimate Frisbee Club Athens – Athens, Greece (Became Flying Moussakats)
    - ATHENS OWLS Ultimate Frisbee – Athens, Greece (Became UFCA, see above)
- Ultimate Frisbee Club Heraklion – Heraklion, Crete, Greece (Inactive since 2020)

=== Ireland ===
IFDA

- Ballydehob Frisbee – Ballydehob
- Bee Ultimate – Dublin
- Belfast Ultimate – Belfast
- Clonakilty Ultimate Frisbee Club – Clonakilty
- Cú Callahan – Fairview Park, Dublin
- Dublin Frisbee 7s – Dublin
- Dublin Gravity – Dublin
- DYUnicorns – Dublin
- Flame – Dublin
- Jabba The Huck – Dublin
- Masterclass Ultimate Ranelagh
- PELT Ultimate – Limerick
- Ranelagh – Dublin
- Rebel Ultimate – Cork
- Sundrive Social Ultimate – Dublin
- Tribe – Galway
- Uproar – Maynooth
- XVI Ultimate – Walkinstown, Dublin

=== Lithuania ===
- Drop That Smile – Vilnius, Lithuania
- KosssMix – Vilnius, Lithuania
- Marių Meškos – Klaipėda, Lithuania
- Skraidantys Drambliai – Kaunas, Lithuania
- Taškas – Zarasai, Lithuania
- Velniai – Jurbarkas, Lithuania
- Vorai – Vilnius, Lithuania
- Zepps – Vilnius, Lithuania
- ZERO – Vilnius, Lithuania

=== Malta ===
- Mela – Malta

=== Netherlands ===
- Amsterdam Ultimate Club (AUC) – Amsterdam, Netherlands
- BFrisBee2's – Nijmegen, Netherlands
- Bluefingers – Zwolle, Netherlands
- Cambo Cakes – Amsterdam, Netherlands
- Disc Devils Twente – Enschede, Netherlands
- Discover – Wageningen, Netherlands
- FC Airborn – Arnhem, Netherlands
- Frisbee Woerden – Woerden
- Gronical Dizziness – Groningen, Netherlands
- MUG – Haarlem, Netherlands
- NUTS – Amsterdam, Netherlands
- Panic – Leiden, Netherlands
- Quick Ultimate – Nijmegen, Netherlands
- Swamp Dragon – 's-Hertogenbosch, Netherlands
- UFO – Utrecht, Netherlands
- Ultimus Prime – The Hague, Netherlands
- UTKA – Utrecht, Netherlands
- Veenendaal Tijgers – Veenendaal, Netherlands
- [Vertigo] – Eindhoven, Netherlands
- WAF – Wageningen, Netherlands

=== Northern Ireland ===
- Belfast Ultimate Giants
- CHASE – Comber, County Down
- Deep Heat

=== Poland ===
- 042 Łódź – Łódź, Poland
- Grandmaster Flash – Warsaw, Poland
- BC Kosmodysk – Warsaw, Poland
- Mashtalesh Team – Kraśnik, Poland
- Zawierucha – Warsaw, Poland

=== Portugal ===
- Disc'Over Lisboa – Lisbon, Portugal
- Disco À MessiNense – São Bartolomeu de Messines, Portugal
- Gambozinos – Aveiro, Portugal
- Leiria Flying Discs – Leiria, Portugal
- Lisbon Ultimate Clube – Lisbon, Portugal
- Vira'o'Disco – Palmela, Portugal
- Ultimate Frisbee Algarve – Portimão, Portugal
- Burning Ribbons Ultimate de Coimbra – Coimbra, Portugal

=== Scotland ===
- Sneeekys
- Black Eagles ("Beagles") – Edinburgh, Scotland
- Blaze – University of Stirling, Stirling, Scotland
- Heriot-Watt – Heriot-Watt University, Edinburgh, Scotland
- Dark Horses – University of Strathclyde, Glasgow, Scotland
- Far Flung – University of Glasgow, Glasgow, Scotland
- Glasgow Ultimate – Glasgow, Scotland
- GUXYZ – Glasgow, Scotland
- Flatball – University of St Andrews, St Andrews, Scotland
- Positive Mojo – Aberdeen, Scotland
- Ro Sham Bo – University of Edinburgh, Edinburgh, Scotland
- Dundee Ultimate – University of Dundee, Dundee, Scotland

=== Serbia ===
- Air Djewrek Ultimate – Novi Sad, Serbia
- Disko klipani – Šabac, Serbia
- Ultimate Frisbee Club WASPS – Subotica, Serbia
- Neradnički – Beograd, Serbia
- Klub letećeg diska SOKO – Pančevo, Serbia
- ČIČE – Jagodina, Serbia
- Cevap Ultimate Frisbee Club – Beograd, Serbia

=== Slovakia ===
- Mental Discorders – Bratislava, Slovakia
- Scorpions – Bratislava, Slovakia
- Discredit – Bratislava, Slovakia
- Outsiterz – Bratislava, Slovakia
- KEfear – Košice, Slovakia

=== Spain ===
- Atis Tirma – Las Palmas de Gran Canaria, Spain
- Diskolaris – Bilbao, Spain
- Huesca – Huesca, Spain
- Cachapililla – Valladolid, Spain
- Cidbee – Burgos, Spain
- Corocotta Ultimate Cantabria – Santander, Spain
- Disctèrics – Girona, Spain
- Fendisc – Santander, Spain
- Frisbillanas – Sevilla, Spain
- Guayota – Tenerife, Spain
- Los Quijotes – Madrid, Spain
- Granayd – Granada, Spain
- Krakens – Barcelona, Spain
- Patatas Bravas – Barcelona, Spain
- Peixets – Barcelona, Spain
- Quimera – Salamanca, Spain
- Tookadisc – Celrà, Girona, Spain
- Winds N'Roses – Roses, Girona, Spain
- Zierzo – Zaragoza, Spain

=== Sweden ===
- KFUM Örebro Frisbee – Örebro, Sweden
- Stenungsunds FC – Stenungsund, Sweden
- Malmö Ultimate – Malmö, Sweden

=== Switzerland ===
- Freespeed Basel – Basel, Switzerland
- Disc Club Panthers – Bern, Switzerland
- Ratrac – Bern, Switzerland
- Crazy Dogs – Stans, Switzerland
- Budwig Ultimate – Neuchâtel, Switzerland
- Fly High – Lausanne, Switzerland
- Flying Angels – Bern, Switzerland
- Flying Colors – Oberkirch, Switzerland
- Flying Saucers – Luzern, Switzerland
- Scorillaz – Bern, Switzerland
- Solebang – Cham, Switzerland
- Zürich Ultimate – Zurich, Switzerland
- Hijack – Kerns, Switzerland
- Mange-Disques – Nyon, Switzerland
- Red I's – Sarnen, Switzerland
- Skyhawks – Winterthur, Switzerland
- Wizards – Geneva, Switzerland
- Wombats – Willisau, Switzerland

=== Turkey ===
- Bilkent Goats – Ankara, Turkey
- 06UC Ultimate – Ankara, Turkey
- Bogazici Ultimate – Istanbul, Turkey
- Caddebostan Olympics – Istanbul, Turkey
- ITU Ultimate – Istanbul, Turkey
- Turk Kasi – Istanbul, Turkey
- Baltimate – İzmir, Turkey

=== Romania ===
- Soimii Cluj – Cluj-Napoca, Romania
- Transilvania Ultimate Frisbee(TUF) – Brasov, Romania
- Bucharest Revolution – Bucharest, Romania
- NUF – Negresti, Romania
- Iasi Jets – Iasi, Romania
- Azvarlirea – Timisoara, Romania

=== Wales ===
- Aberystwyth University (Mwnci See) – Aberystwyth, Wales
- Abertawe Ultimate - Swansea, Wales
- Bangor University – Bangor, Wales
- Cardiff University (No Frills) – Cardiff, Wales
- Frizee Rascals – Bridgend, Wales
- South Wales Storm - Cardiff, Wales
- Swansea Univerity - Swansea, Wales

== Oceanic ==
=== Australia ===
==== Australian Capital Territory ====
- Burley Griffins Ultimate (Canberra, Australia) – Mixed
- Exploding Kittens (Canberra, Australia) – Mixed
- F-Troop (Canberra, Australia) – Mixed
- Factory (Canberra, Australia) – Women's
- Fyshwick Ultimate (Canberra, Australia) – Open
- H.I.V.E. (Canberra, Australia) – Mixed

==== New South Wales ====
- Bench (Sydney, Australia) – Open
- Banana Republic Ultimate (Sydney, Australia) – Mixed
- Bin Chicken Ultimate (Sydney, Australia) – Mixed
- DUFF (Sydney, Australia) – Mixed, Open, Women's
- GWS Blaze (Sydney, Australia) – Women's
- Hills Ultimate (Sydney, Australia) – Mixed, Women's
- I-Beam (Newcastle, Australia) – Open
- Inner West Ultimate (Sydney, Australia) – Mixed, Open, Women's
- Kaf (Sydney, Australia) – Mixed
- Krank (Wollongong, Australia) – Mixed, Open
- Manly Ultimate (Sydney, Australia) – Mixed, Open, Women's
- Pie Wagon (Newcastle, Australia) – Mixed
- Pompey Magnus (Sydney, Australia) – Mixed
- Rogue (Sydney, Australia) – Women's
- Sugar Magnolias (Newcastle, Australia) – Women's
- Sunder (Sydney, Australia) – Open
- Surge (Wollongong, Australia) – Women's
- VLS (Sydney, Australia) – Mixed

==== Queensland ====
- Extinction (Brisbane, Australia) – Mixed, Open, Women's
- Fuse (Brisbane, Australia) – Women's
- Gentlemen's Club (Brisbane, Australia) – Open
- Ladies Lounge (Brisbane, Australia) – Women's
- Mammoth (Brisbane, Australia) – Open
- Monstars (Brisbane, Australia) – Mixed
- League of Ivy (Townsville, Australia) – Women's
- Townsvillians (Townsville, Australia) – Mixed, Open

==== South Australia ====
- Outbreak (Adelaide, Australia) – Open
- Valkyrie (Adelaide, Australia) – Women's
- Vanguard (Adelaide, Australia) – Mixed
- Zig Theory (Adelaide, Australia) – Women's

==== Victoria ====
- Ballarat Ultimate (Ballarat, Australia) – Mixed, Open, Women's
- Bauhaus (Melbourne, Australia) – Women's
- Brunswick Ultimate Disc Society (Melbourne, Australia) – Mixed
- Chilly Ultimate Club (Melbourne, Australia) – Open, Women's
- Dirty Squirrels (Melbourne, Australia) – Mixed
- Ellipsis (Melbourne, Australia) – Open, Women's, Mixed
- Funny Duck Ultimate (Melbourne, Australia) – Mixed, Open
- Heads of State (Melbourne, Australia) – Mixed, Open, Women's
- Geelong Mudlarks (Geelong, Australia) – Mixed, Open
- Kahlipsquid (Melbourne, Australia) – Mixed
- Klippas Flippas (Melbourne, Australia) – Mixed Grandmasters
- Meraki (Melbourne, Australia) – Mixed
- Paradigm (Melbourne, Australia) – Mixed
- Pirates Heart Ninjas (Melbourne, Australia) – Mixed
- Project Lad Mixed Ultimate (Melbourne, Australia) – Mixed
- Social Ultimatum (Melbourne, Australia) – Mixed
- Wild M&M&Ms (Melbourne, Australia) – Mixed
- Wyndham Ultimate (Melbourne, Australia) – Mixed, Open, Women's

==== Western Australia ====
- Marlow Street (Perth, Australia) – Mixed
- Bronze Bullseye (Perth, Australia) – Open
- Disc Graceful (Perth, Australia) – Mixed
- Kaos Ultimate (Perth, Australia) – Women's
- Sisko (Perth, Australia) – Women's
- Sublime (Perth, Australia) – Mixed, Open, Women's
- Curtin Ultimate Club (Perth, Australia) – Mixed

=== New Zealand ===
- Credo (Christchurch, New Zealand)
- Endeavour (Auckland, New Zealand)
- Groot (Auckland, New Zealand)
- Hammertron (Hamilton, New Zealand)
- Wildcats (Wellington, New Zealand)
- Blueberries (Auckland, New Zealand)
- Capital Punishment (Wellington, New Zealand)
- Chch Chicks (Christchurch, New Zealand)
- Naaasty Women (Christchurch, New Zealand)
- Vixenz (Auckland, New Zealand)
- Zodiac (Auckland, New Zealand)

== Asia ==
- (China) Big Brother
- (China) Beijing Bang
- (China) Hangtime
- (China) Air Kazak
- (China) Tianjin Speed
- (China) Guangzhou Storm
- (China) Dalian Smurfs
- (China) Ningbo UFO
- (China) Shanghai Wings
- (China) Shanghai HUWA
- (China) Shenzhen Peng
- (China) Shenzhen ZEN
- (China) Qingdao FUQ
- (China) Air Woo
- (China) Hurricane Zhuhai
- (China) Artemis Moonshot Academy,Beijing
- Air Traffic Control (Bangalore, India)
- Airbenders (Bangalore, India)
- Airborne (Chennai, India)
- Alphas (Auroville, India)
- Ashoka Hammerheads (Sonepat, India)
- BITS UFC (Goa, India)
- Blitzkrieg (Chennai, India)
- Callahans (Chennai, India)
- Chakraa (Chennai, India)
- Deaf and Dumb (Surat, India)
- Disc-o-Deewane (Bangalore, India)
- Discotech (Hyderabad, India)
- Discreed (Coimbatore, India)
- Dream Catchers (Ahmedabad, India)
- Falcons (Bangalore, India)
- FlyWild (Chennai, India)
- Jumbish (Surat, India)
- Learning To Fly (Bangalore, India)
- Minions (Surat, India)
- Night Crawlers (Mumbai, India)
- Spinergy (Auroville, India)
- Stall 7 (Chennai, India)
- Storm Chasers (Mumbai, India)
- Strikers (Surat, India)
- Thatte Idli Kaal Soup (Bangalore, India)
- Trailblazers (Surat, India)
- West Coast Rascals (Mumbai, India)
- Zer0 Gravity (Surat, India)
- Discindo (Jakarta, Indonesia)
- (Japan) Buzz Bullets
- (Japan) Iku!
- (Japan) Tajima Gyu
- (Malaysia) Carebears
- (Malaysia) AUR
- (Malaysia) Sohai JJ
- (Malaysia) SWAT 7d
- (Malaysia) Wildcats
- (Malaysia) Oops
- (Malaysia) Badgers
- (Malaysia) The Islanders
- (Malaysia) Panthers
- (Malaysia) Blitzers
- (Malaysia) MonSoon
- (Malaysia) ULTRAS
- (Malaysia) Headhunters
- (Malaysia) X-Cross
- (Malaysia) Flying Naan
- (Malaysia) Satu Lagi
- (Malaysia) Rojaks
- (Malaysia) Los Ninos
- (Malaysia) UiTM Lions
- (Malaysia) SaTe-Shah Alam Ultimate
- (Malaysia) Black Unicorn
- (Philippines) Dragons
- (Philippines) Pirates
- (Philippines) Sunken Pleasure
- (Philippines) Rogers
- (Philippines) Sid Vicious
- (Philippines) Stags Ultimate
- (Philippines) Friday Frisbee – AUP
- (Philippines) Circuit Breakers
- (Philippines) Ateneo Ultimate
- (Philippines) Weekend Karma
- (Philippines) Admirals Ultimate
- (Philippines) Woodrose Ultimate
- (Philippines) South Luzon Ultimate
- (Philippines) Monsters
- (Philippines) Cavite Kids
- (Philippines) Pusakalz
- (Philippines) Animo Ultimate
- (Philippines) Super Bueno
- (Philippines) UP DUO
- (Philippines) Barangay Don Jose Spiders
- (Philippines) Blackfleet Ultimate
- (Philippines) Xavier Ultimate
- (Singapore) Shiok – Mixed, Opens, Women's
- (Singapore) Chuckies – Mixed
- (Singapore) Disc Knights – Mixed
- (Singapore) Disctractors
- (Singapore) Freakshow
- (Singapore) Thirsty Camels Ultimate
- (Singapore) Zero Discplacement
- (Singapore) Helix
- (Singapore) Rascals
- (Singapore) Havoc – Women's
- (Singapore) Crimson Clovers – Women's
- (Singapore) Crackerjacks – Opens
- (Singapore) Appendix – Beach
- (Singapore) Fu Fighters – Beach
- Subliminal (Seoul, South Korea)
- 붐얼티밋 (Daegu & Pohang, South Korea)
- Hanoi Ultimate Club (Hanoi, Vietnam)
- Saigon Ultimate Club (Ho Chi Minh City, Vietnam)

Both Vietnamese teams may appear as team Vudoo (Vietnam Ultimate Defense Offense Organization) in international tournaments across Asia.

- Saigon Monsoon Ultimate (Ho Chi Minh City, Vietnam)
- Entixie Ultimate Club (Ho Chi Minh City, Vietnam)
- Spirit Ultimate Club (Da Nang, Vietnam)
- Frisbee NTC Đà Nẵng (Da Nang, Vietnam)
- Frisbee Huế (Hue City, Vietnam)
- Frisbee NTSea (Nha Trang, Vietnam)
- RMIT Vietnam Ultimate Frisbee (Ho Chi Minh City, Vietnam)
- Saigon Entixie Ultimate (Ho Chi Minh City, Vietnam)
- Fulbright Ultimate Club (Ho Chi Minh City, Vietnam)
- Baymax Ultimate Club (Ho Chi Minh City, Vietnam)
- Black Panthers (Ho Chi Minh City, Vietnam)
- Daknong Ultimate Frisbee club (Dak Nong, Vietnam)
- CanTho Entixie Ultimate (Can Tho City, Vietnam)
- Thủ Đức Entixie Ultimate (Ho Chi Minh City, Vietnam)
- Flamme Ultimate Team (Ho Chi Minh City, Vietnam)

== Africa ==
- (Egypt) Alexandria Ultimate
- (Egypt) AUC Mayhem
- (Egypt) GUC Airbenders
- (Egypt) MUDD
- (Egypt) Supernova
- (Egypt) Flicking Pharaohs
- (Egypt) Thunder
- (Egypt) Zayed Nar
- MOROCCAN FLYING DISC ASSOCIATION (MFDA) – Morocco
- (Morocco) MYUA (Moroccan Youth Ultimate Association) – Marrakesh
- (Morocco) Ultikech – Marrakesh
- (Morocco) ALU (Agadir Lions Ultimate) – Agadir
- (Morocco) AUI Ultimate Comets – (Ifrane)
- (Mozambique) Da Bique (Maputo)
- (South Africa) Catch 22 (Cape Town)
- (South Africa) Chilli (Cape Town)
- (South Africa) Gale Force (Port Elizabeth)
- (South Africa) Ghost Ultimate Club (Cape Town)
- (South Africa) Hammerheads (East London)
- (South Africa) Labradors (Pretoria)
- (South Africa) Long Donkeys (Pietermaritzburg)
- (South Africa) Maties Ultimate (Stellenbosch)
- (South Africa) Orange Farm (Johannesburg)
- (South Africa) Bunnies (Durban)
- (South Africa) Rebels (East London)
- (South Africa) Zone Rangers (Johannesburg)
- (South Africa) Salusa 45 (Cape Town)
- (South Africa) Skyveld (Johannesburg)
- (South Africa) Soweto Ultimate (Johannesburg)
- (South Africa) UCT Flying Tigers (Cape Town)
- (South Africa) UCT Roaring Tigers (Cape Town)
- (South Africa) Ult Ctrl Del (Johannesburg)
- (South Africa) Ultimates (Polokwane)
- (South Africa) Ultitude (Gauteng)
- (South Africa) WITS Voodoo Kudus (Johannesburg)

== Latin America ==
=== Argentina ===
- Jauría (La Plata, Argentina)

=== Mexico ===
- Malafama (Mexico City, Mexico)

=== Bolivia ===
- Ara Jüu (Santa Cruz, Bolivia)

=== Colombia ===
- Revolution (Medellín, Colombia)

== High school teams ==
=== Men's teams ===
- Revolution (Cincinnati, Ohio)
- Mason Comets (Cincinnati, Ohio)
- South Eugene Flatball (Eugene, Oregon)
- Lebanon Warriors (Cincinnati, Ohio)
- Lexington Hucking Fooligans (Lexington, Massachusetts)
