= Disc Northwest =

The DiscNW Logo, created by renowned Musqueam artist Susan Point

Disc Northwest (also DiscNW or Northwest Ultimate Association) is a Seattle based ultimate frisbee organization with the aim of increasing participation in the sport of Ultimate at all levels. DiscNW claims to be the largest and most active Ultimate organization in the United States, supporting many teams at the club, local, high school, middle school and elementary school levels. Their mission statement is "Serve as a regional resource, promoting growth in the sport of Ultimate and instilling the spirit of sportsmanship at all levels of play."

DiscNW is a registered 501(c)(3) nonprofit, educational organization in the state of Washington. DiscNW has a full-time staff of six, an active board of directors, and more than 250 volunteers.

DiscNW was founded by Joey Gray, Tom George, Mary Lowry, Jordan Dey, Maria Langlais, Mark Friedland, Bill Penrose and Lisa Thomas in 1995 as a nonprofit repository for funds generated by the growing Potlatch tournament. Soon, DiscNW became an umbrella for the spring ultimate league founded by Mark Friedland and others in 1984 and the fall league founded by Mike King. The first independent Juniors ultimate league was started in 1993 by Mary Lowry, Joe Bisignano, Jeff Jorgenson and others. The growth of youth ultimate in the region was rapid: in 2014, the DiscNW Middle School Spring League had over 1000 players on 79 mixed teams. In spring of 2007 DiscNW inaugurated what is believed to be the world's first elementary school League, with eight teams, and in 2016, the first stand-alone elementary school youth tournament.

Today, DiscNW runs recreational programming for youth and adults, serving more than 12000 players in the greater Puget Sound region annually, Programs offered include Adult Rec Leagues, Summer Youth Day Camps, Youth school-based and club leagues, youth and adult tournaments, and learn to play and coach development clinics. DiscNW is committed to reducing traditional barriers to access for underserved populations and uses a sliding scale fee program for all fo it's events. The 2019 Aspen Institute State of Play report highlighted the popularity of youth ultimate in our region, and indicated the sport "has high participation rates across racial, ethnic and socioeconomic groups." The 2019 State of Play report for Seattle-King County found that "Nontraditional programs and non mainstream sports, like Ultimate frisbee, offer models for positive youth development."

== DiscNW tournaments ==
- Resolutions - mixed team, early January
- Slog In The Bog - mixed team, March
- Spring Reign - high school and middle school teams, April
- Spring Jam - elementary school teams, May
- Sunbreak - mixed team, July 4 weekend
- Seattle Seasoned - Masters club, July
- Sea Plastic - beach (5v5), mixed team, late July
- Turkey Bowl - mixed hat, November (Thanksgiving weekend)
- SnowBreak - hat, December

== DiscNW leagues ==
- Winter Wonder League - 10 teams, December–March, for Defenders of Women (DOWs) and Defenders of Choice (DOX) players who are 18 and older to play in a fun, relaxed atmosphere.
- Winter Team League - 35 mixed teams, December–March, no scorekeeping
- Youth Winter High School League - 34+ mixed teams, December–March
- Youth Winter Tacoma High School and Middle School League - free beginner-friendly learning league
- Spring League - 60 mixed teams, March–June, highly competitive
- Spring Verns League - 8 teams, mixed hat, March–June, beginner friendly
- Spring Mixed Hat League - 6 teams
- Spring Shoreline Wonder Hat League - 4 teams
- Spring Tacoma Indoor and Outdoor Hat Leagues - 8 teams
- Youth Spring High School Gx League - 30 teams
- Youth Spring High School Bx League - 10+ teams
- Youth Spring Middle School League - 65 mixed teams
- Youth Spring Elementary School League - 80+ mixed teams, fastest growing league
- Summer League - 55 mixed teams, June–August
- Summer Corporate League - 26 mixed 'corporate teams', June–August
- Summer Hat League - 12 mixed hat teams, June–August, beginner friendly
- Summer Mens Hat League - 4 teams, July–August
- Summer Masters Hat League - 8 teams, July–August
- Summer Wonder Hat League - 4 teams, June–August
- Fall Team League - 60 mixed teams
- Fall Hat League - 16 teams, mildly competitive
- Fall Tacoma Womens Hat League - 4 teams
- Fall Redmond Mens Hat League - 4 teams
- Fall Olympia Hat League - 4 teams
- Youth Fall High School BX League - 50 Teams
- Youth Fall Seattle Public School Middle School League - DiscNW supports this SPS program - 75 teams
- Youth Fall High School Gx League - 11 teams

== See also ==
- Seattle Riot (Ultimate)
- Seattle Sockeye
