= 2007 World Championships of Beach Ultimate =

- Host city: Maceió, Brazil
- Organizer: WFDF
- Dates: December 11–16

The 2007 World Championships of Beach Ultimate was the 2nd edition of the international Beach Ultimate competition organized by World Flying Disc Federation. They were held in Maceió, Brazil from 11 to 16 December 2007.

== Medal summary ==
Event	Gold	Silver	Bronze
Open	Australia	Philippines	United States
Women's	United Kingdom	United States	Australia
Mixed	United States	Germany	Austria
Open masters	United States	United Kingdom	Canada

== Medal table ==
* Host nation (Brazil)

Rank	Nation	Gold	Silver	Bronze	Total
1	United States	2	1	1	4
2	Great Britain	1	1	0	2
3	Australia	1	0	1	2
4	Germany	0	1	0	1
4	Philippines	0	1	0	1
6	Austria	0	0	1	1
6	Canada	0	0	1	1
Totals (7 entries)		4	4	4	12
