= 2011 World Championships of Beach Ultimate =

- Host city: Lignano Sabbiadoro, Italy
- Organizer: WFDF
- Dates: August 22–28

The 2011 World Championships of Beach Ultimate was the 3rd edition of the international Beach Ultimate competition organized by World Flying Disc Federation. They were held in Lignano Sabbiadoro, Italy, from 22 to 28 August 2011.

== Medal summary ==
| Event | Gold | Silver | Bronze |
|---|---|---|---|
| Open | United States | Philippines | Switzerland |
| Women's | United States | Canada | United Kingdom |
| Mixed | United States | Germany | Australia |
| Open masters | United States | Austria | France |
| Mixed masters | United Kingdom | United States | Germany |
| Open grand masters | United States | Austria | Germany |

== Medal table ==
* Host nation (Italy)

| Rank | Nation | Gold | Silver | Bronze | Total |
|---|---|---|---|---|---|
| 1 | United States | 5 | 1 | 0 | 6 |
| 2 | Great Britain | 1 | 0 | 1 | 2 |
| 3 | Austria | 0 | 2 | 0 | 2 |
| 4 | Germany | 0 | 1 | 2 | 3 |
| 5 | Canada | 0 | 1 | 0 | 1 |
| 5 | Philippines | 0 | 1 | 0 | 1 |
| 7 | Australia | 0 | 0 | 1 | 1 |
| 7 | France | 0 | 0 | 1 | 1 |
| 7 | Switzerland | 0 | 0 | 1 | 1 |
| Totals (9 entries) | | 6 | 6 | 6 | 18 |
