= 2015 World Championships of Beach Ultimate =

- Host city: Dubai, United Arab Emirates
- Organizer: WFDF
- Dates: March 8–13

The 2015 World Championships of Beach Ultimate was the 4th edition of the international Beach Ultimate competition organized by World Flying Disc Federation. They were held in Dubai, United Arab Emirates, from 8 to 13 March 2015.

== Medal summary ==
Event	Gold	Silver	Bronze
Open	United States	United Kingdom	Philippines
Women's	United States	Russia	United Kingdom
Mixed	Germany	Canada	United States
Open masters	United States	Canada	Philippines
Women's masters	United States	Canada	United Kingdom
Mixed masters	United States	Canada	Australia
Open grand masters	United States	Sweden	Finland

== Medal table ==
* Host nation (United Arab Emirates)

Rank	Nation	Gold	Silver	Bronze	Total
1	United States	6	0	1	7
2	Germany	1	0	0	1
3	Canada	0	4	0	4
4	Great Britain	0	1	2	3
5	Russia	0	1	0	1
5	Sweden	0	1	0	1
7	Philippines	0	0	2	2
8	Australia	0	0	1	1
8	Finland	0	0	1	1
Totals (9 entries)		7	7	7	21
