= Henry Callahan =

American ultimate player

Henry Callahan (1957–1982) was a player and ambassador of Ultimate and helped bring the sport to the University of Oregon, formally establishing a team in 1978. In 1982, he was murdered during a robbery while working in Boulder, Colorado. His killer, Robert Wieghard, was found guilty of first degree murder and sentenced to life in prison. Under more lenient laws at the time, he became eligible for parole after serving 20 years. However, Wieghard has been continuously denied parole. Both the Callahan Award, given each year to the best male and female college Ultimate players and the Callahan Rules of Ultimate are named after him. The idea and the award were founded by Charles Kerr, a long-time coach.

There is also a move in Ultimate named after Callahan called a Callahan. A Callahan is when a defensive player intercepts the disc in the opponent's end zone for a point. It is a rare occurrence, because it requires a defender to intercept, rather than simply block, a pass in the offense's own end zone. Under normal circumstances, the offense does not start a possession within their own end zone, so opportunities for a Callahan are limited to situations where the offense has been forced into their own end zone (either by a good pull or defensive pressure) or backward passes near the end zone. The move is so called because it was first legalized as a goal (rather than needing to be put into play from the goal line) in the Callahan version of the rules, which differed from the Ultimate Player Association's current rules at the time. The rules were subsequently changed in both the UPA (now USA Ultimate) and the World Flying Disc Federation to make a Callahan a legal goal under all rule sets used for Ultimate.

Henry Callahan was also a disc golf player and his family donated money to install a memorial disc golf course at Bevier Park in Waukegan, Illinois. Completed in 1992 and expanded in 2008, this course is located in Henry Callahan Memorial Park.
