= 2015 World Under-23 Ultimate Championships =

- Host city: London, United Kingdom
- Organizer: WFDF
- Dates: July 12–18

The 2015 World Under-23 Ultimate Championships was the 2nd edition international ultimate competition organized by World Flying Disc Federation. They were held in London, United Kingdom, from 12 to 18 July 2015.

== Medal summary ==
Event	Gold	Silver	Bronze
Open	United States	Canada	Japan
Women's	Japan	United States	Canada
Mixed	United States	Australia	Canada

== Medal table ==
* Host nation (Great Britain)

Rank	Nation	Gold	Silver	Bronze	Total
1	United States	2	1	0	3
2	Japan	1	0	1	2
3	Canada	0	1	2	3
4	Australia	0	1	0	1
Totals (4 entries)		3	3	3	9
