= 2013 World Under-23 Ultimate Championships =

- Host city: Toronto, Canada
- Organizer: WFDF
- Dates: July 22–28

The 2013 World Under-23 Ultimate Championships was the 1st edition of the international ultimate competition organized by World Flying Disc Federation. They were held in Toronto, Canada, from 22 to 28 July 2013.

== Medal summary ==
Event	Gold	Silver	Bronze
Open	United States	Canada	Australia
Women's	United States	Japan	Canada
Mixed	United States	Canada	Japan

== Medal table ==
* Host nation (Canada)

Rank	Nation	Gold	Silver	Bronze	Total
1	United States	3	0	0	3
2	Canada*	0	2	1	3
3	Japan	0	1	1	2
4	Australia	0	0	1	1
Totals (4 entries)		3	3	3	9
