= 2023 World Beach Ultimate Championships =

- Host city: Huntington Beach, CA
- Organizer: WFDF
- Dates: 1–5 November

The 2023 World Beach Ultimate Championships was the 6th edition of the international beach ultimate competition organized by World Flying Disc Federation. They were held in Huntington Beach, CA, United States, from 1 to 5 November 2023.

== Medal summary ==
Event	Gold	Silver	Bronze
Open	United States	Spain	United Kingdom
Women's	United States	Canada	Spain
Mixed	France	Spain	United States
Mixed masters	United States	Canada	Germany
Open grand masters	United States	Philippines	Canada

== Medal table ==
* Host nation (United States)

Rank	Nation	Gold	Silver	Bronze	Total
1	United States*	4	0	1	5
2	France	1	0	0	1
3	Canada	0	2	1	3
3	Spain	0	2	1	3
5	Philippines	0	1	0	1
6	Germany	0	0	1	1
6	Great Britain	0	0	1	1
Totals (7 entries)		5	5	5	15
