= 2017 World Championships of Beach Ultimate =

- Host city: Royan, France
- Organizer: WFDF
- Dates: June 18–24

The 2017 World Championships of Beach Ultimate was the 5th edition of the international beach ultimate competition organized by World Flying Disc Federation. They were held in Royan, France, from 18 to 24 June 2017.

== Medal summary ==
Event	Gold	Silver	Bronze
Open	United States	United Kingdom	France
Women's	Russia	United States	United Kingdom
Mixed	United States	Canada	Germany
Open masters	United States	France	Canada
Women's masters	United States	Canada	Australia
Mixed masters	United States	Canada	France
Open grand masters	United States	United Kingdom	Canada

== Medal table ==
* Host nation (France)

Rank	Nation	Gold	Silver	Bronze	Total
1	United States	6	1	0	7
2	Russia	1	0	0	1
3	Canada	0	3	2	5
4	Great Britain	0	2	1	3
5	France*	0	1	2	3
6	Australia	0	0	1	1
6	Germany	0	0	1	1
Totals (7 entries)		7	7	7	21
