= Seattle Sockeye =

Is a men's ultimate team based in Seattle, Washington

- Founded: 1993
- League: USAU Open Club Division
- Based in: Seattle, Washington
- Championships: World: 1997; Club: 2004, 2006, 2007, 2019
- Mascot: Sockeye Salmon
- Website: www.instagram.com/seattlesockeye

Seattle Sockeye is a men's club ultimate frisbee team based in Seattle, Washington. They won the open (men's) division at the 2004, 2006, and 2007 UPA and 2019 USA Ultimate Club Championships, and the 1997 WFDF World Ultimate Club Championships. They have qualified for the Club Championships every year but once since 2000 and are the 2nd highest ranking club men's program of all time.

Sockeye represented America as the U.S. National Team at the World Ultimate and Guts Championships in Vancouver, Canada in 2008, earning silver. Sockeye also traveled to the World Ultimate Club Championships twice, winning silver in both Prague (2010) and Lecco (2014).

Sockeye is known for a playing style that emphasizes quick disc movement, creative breaks, use of the breakside, and the use of small spaces.

== Championships ==
- 1997 1st Place World Ultimate Club Championship (Defeated Double Happiness)
- 2004 1st Place UPA Nationals (Defeated Jam)
- 2006 1st Place UPA Nationals (Defeated Furious George)
- 2007 1st Place UPA Nationals (Defeated Johnny Bravo)
- 2019 1st Place USAU Nationals (Defeated Chicago Machine)
