= 2018 World Under-24 Ultimate Championships =

- Host city: Perth, Australia
- Organizer: WFDF
- Dates: January 7–13

The 2018 World Under-24 Ultimate Championships was the 3rd edition of the international ultimate competition organized by World Flying Disc Federation. They were held in Perth, Australia, from 7 to 13 January 2018.

== Medal summary ==
Event	Gold	Silver	Bronze
Open	United States	Italy	Australia
Women's	United States	Canada	Australia
Mixed	United States	Japan	Canada

== Medal table ==
* Host nation (Australia)

Rank	Nation	Gold	Silver	Bronze	Total
1	United States	3	0	0	3
2	Canada	0	1	1	2
3	Italy	0	1	0	1
3	Japan	0	1	0	1
5	Australia*	0	0	2	2
Totals (5 entries)		3	3	3	9
