= 2023 World Under-24 Ultimate Championships =

- Host city: Nottingham, United Kingdom
- Organizer: WFDF
- Dates: 2–8 July

The 2023 World Under-24 Ultimate Championships was the 5th edition of the international ultimate competition organized by World Flying Disc Federation. They were held in Nottingham, United Kingdom, from 2 to 8 July 2023.

== Medal summary ==
Event	Gold	Silver	Bronze
Open	United States	Belgium	Germany
Women's	United States	Japan	Germany
Mixed	United States	Singapore	Japan

== Medal table ==
* Host nation (Great Britain)

Rank	Nation	Gold	Silver	Bronze	Total
1	United States	3	0	0	3
2	Japan	0	1	1	2
3	Belgium	0	1	0	1
3	Singapore	0	1	0	1
5	Germany	0	0	2	2
Totals (5 entries)		3	3	3	9
