= 2025 World Under-24 Ultimate Championships =

- Host city: Logroño, Spain
- Organizer: WFDF
- Dates: 21–28 June

The 2025 World Under-24 Ultimate Championships was the 6th edition of the international ultimate competition organized by World Flying Disc Federation. They were held in Logroño, Spain, from 21 to 28 June 2025.

== Medal summary ==
Event	Gold	Silver	Bronze
Open	United States	Belgium	Canada
Women's	United States	Japan	United Kingdom
Mixed	United States	Canada	France

== Medal table ==
* Host nation (Spain)

Rank	Nation	Gold	Silver	Bronze	Total
1	United States	3	0	0	3
2	Canada	0	1	1	2
3	Belgium	0	1	0	1
3	Japan	0	1	0	1
5	France	0	0	1	1
5	Great Britain	0	0	1	1
Totals (6 entries)		3	3	3	9
