= 2019 World Under-24 Ultimate Championships =

- Host city: Heidelberg, Germany
- Organizer: WFDF
- Dates: July 13–20

The 2019 World Under-24 Ultimate Championships was the 4th edition international ultimate competition organized by World Flying Disc Federation. They were held in Heidelberg, Germany, from 13 to 20 July 2019.

== Medal summary ==
Event	Gold	Silver	Bronze
Open	United States	Canada	Italy
Women's	United States	Japan	Canada
Mixed	United States	Japan	Singapore

== Medal table ==
* Host nation (Germany)

Rank	Nation	Gold	Silver	Bronze	Total
1	United States	3	0	0	3
2	Japan	0	2	0	2
3	Canada	0	1	1	2
4	Italy	0	0	1	1
4	Singapore	0	0	1	1
Totals (5 entries)		3	3	3	9
