= 2004 World Championships of Beach Ultimate =

- Host city: Figueira da Foz, Portugal
- Organizer: WFDF
- Dates: August 25–29

The 2004 World Championships of Beach Ultimate was the 1st international edition of the Beach Ultimate competition organized by World Flying Disc Federation. They were held in Figueira da Foz, Portugal from 25 to 29 August 2004.

== Medal summary ==
Event	Gold	Silver	Bronze
Open	United States	France	Sweden
Women's	United States	Germany	France
Mixed	Germany	United Kingdom	Austria
Open masters	Austria	United States	Germany

== Medal table ==
* Host nation (Portugal)

Rank	Nation	Gold	Silver	Bronze	Total
1	United States	2	1	0	3
2	Germany	1	1	1	3
3	Austria	1	0	1	2
4	France	0	1	1	2
5	Great Britain	0	1	0	1
6	Sweden	0	0	1	1
Totals (6 entries)		4	4	4	12
