= Carolina Friends School =

American private school in North Carolina

Location
- 4809 Friends School Road; Durham, North Carolina 27705; United States; 36°0′22″N 79°1′27″W

Information
- Type: Private
- Religious affiliation: Quaker
- Founded: 1962 (64 years ago)
- CEEB code: 341047
- Head of school: Karen Cumberbatch
- Staff: 105
- Grades: Age 3 to Grade 12
- Enrollment: 514
- Campus: 126 acres
- Campus type: Suburban
- Colors: Green and white
- Athletics: North Carolina Independent Schools Athletic Association (NCISAA)
- Accreditation: SAIS, FCE
- Tuition: $1,320 - $26,460 (Upper School) $1,230-$24,590 (Middle School) $1,110–$22,240 (Lower School) $710–$24,480 (Early School)
- Affiliations: NCAIS, NAIS
- Website: cfsnc.org

Carolina Friends School is an independent, co-educational Quaker school located in Durham, North Carolina. It enrolls students from age 3 and pre-kindergarten through grade 12. The school was founded in 1962 by members of the Durham Friends Meeting and Chapel Hill Meeting of the Religious Society of Friends as one of the first racially integrated schools in the South and the first in the state. While CFS is guided by Quaker values, it is a secular and inclusive independent school. Most students, parents, and teachers at CFS are not Quaker. They follow other religious traditions or none.

== Accreditation ==
Carolina Friends School is accredited by the Southern Association of Independent Schools and the Friends Council on Education. The school is also a member the North Carolina Association of Independent Schools and the National Association of Independent Schools. The Early Schools are licensed by the State of North Carolina Division of Child Development. Carolina Friends School is also a member of the Independent Curriculum Group and of the Greater Durham Chamber of Commerce.

== Facilities ==
Carolina Friends School consists of three distinct campuses. The main campus is located ten to fifteen minutes from Durham, Chapel Hill and Hillsborough. The 126 acre wooded campus has fourteen classroom buildings, including libraries, science and computer laboratories, art and music studios, a performing arts center, meeting hall and gymnasium. The main campus is home to the Upper, Middle and Lower Schools as well as the Campus Early School. Satellite campuses include the Chapel Hill Early School at 531 Raleigh Road in Chapel Hill and the Durham Early School located at 404 Alexander Avenue in Durham.

== Academics ==
Upper School students must earn a minimum of 90 credits to graduate. One credit is awarded per trimester of coursework. These must be distributed: 4 years Language Arts, 3 years Math, 3 years Social Studies (including 1 year US History), 3 years Science (including 1 year biological, 1 year physical), 2 years Foreign Language (must be same language), 2 years Community Service, 2 years Physical Education, and 8 credits in Cultural Arts.

Advanced Placement courses are not offered at Carolina Friends School, although students regularly take AP exams. In 2014, 13 AP exams were taken, and the mean score was 4.15 (median score was 4); that class also had two National Merit Scholars.

== Athletics ==
Carolina Friends School competes as a member of the Triad Athletic Conference and North Carolina Independent Schools Association. Sports include: baseball, basketball, cross-country, soccer, swimming, tennis, track & field, ultimate Frisbee, and volleyball. In 2011 the Upper School Girls Varsity Basketball team and the Upper School Boys Varsity Soccer team were runners-up for the state championship in the 2A division. Both teams repeated this achievement in 2012. In 2013, Carolina Friends Ultimate Frisbee team won the North Carolina state tournament. In 2014 the team both held their state title, and won the USAU High School Southern Regional Championship tournament.

== Notable alumni ==
- Robbie Fulks, alternative country singer-songwriter (1980)
- Jim Lauderdale, singer and songwriter
- Miles Bonsignore of The Try Guys, youtuber and podcast host

== See also ==
- List of Friends Schools
