= Seattle Riot (ultimate) =

Women's ultimate team in Seattle, Washington

- Sport: Ultimate
- Founded: 2000
- League: USA Ultimate
- Based in: Seattle, WA
- Head coach: Andy Lovseth
- Website: https://seattleriot.org/

Riot is an elite-level women's ultimate team based in Seattle, Washington. Riot was founded in 2000, after the previous top-level women's team in Seattle, Women on the Verge, disbanded. They were the women's champions at the 2004 and 2005 UPA Club Championships (now USA Ultimate). They have also won the WFDF World Ultimate Club Championships in 2002 and 2014.

Seattle Riot is coached by Andy Lovseth, Gwen Ambler, and Rohre Titcomb, and is captained by Alyssa Weatherford, Bailey Zanhiser, and Julia Snyder.

There have been three individual winners of the Kathy Pufahl Spirit Award from Seattle Riot: Gwen Ambler (2011), Kati Halmos (2005), and Vida Towne (2004). Additionally, Riot has won the team spirit award three times in 2015, 2013, and 2006.

== Community involvement ==
Seattle Riot participates in numerous community efforts. Riot player Hana Kawai founded the All Girl Everything Ultimate Program (AGE UP) to "build power among young people of color, particularly girls, in Seattle’s South End". Former player Shannon O'Malley is the director of DiscNW Summer Eastside Youth Ultimate Camp, and many current players coach at that camp. Former player and current coach Gwen Ambler founded the Seattle Women's winter league.

== Team history ==
Riot USAU Club National Championship Finishes
Year	Finish	Notes
2000	DNQ	
2001	2nd	
2002	3rd (tie)	
2003	2nd	
2004	1st	Beat Prime
2005	1st	Beat Backhoe
2006	2nd	Fell to San Francisco Fury
2007	2nd	Fell to San Francisco Fury
2008	2nd	Fell to San Francisco Fury
2009	3rd (tie)	
2010	3rd (tie)	
2011	2nd	Fell to San Francisco Fury
2012	2nd	Fell to San Francisco Fury
2013	3rd	
2014	3rd (tie)	
2015	2nd	Fell to Boston Brute Squad
2016	2nd	Fell to Boston Brute Squad
2017	5th	
2018	3rd (tie)	
2019	5th	
