= Vancouver Furious George =

- Founded: 1995
- League: USA Ultimate Club Division Ultimate Canada Club Division
- Based in: Vancouver
- Head coach: Al Nichols, Matt Berezan, Jacky Hau
- Championships: UPA: 2002, 2003, 2005; Canadian: 1995, 1996, 1997, 1999, 2000, 2003, 2007, 2011, 2012, 2013, 2019, 2021, 2026

Furious George is an elite men's ultimate club team based in Vancouver, British Columbia, Canada.

Founded in 1995, they were the open champions at the 2002, 2003 and 2005 UPA (now USA Ultimate) Club Championships. They have also won 13 Canadian Ultimate Championships: in 1995, 1996, 1997, 1999, 2000, 2003, 2007, 2011, 2012, 2013 and 2019, 2021 & 2026. Furious George won gold as Team Canada (with several non-regular additions from other club teams around the country) in 1998, 2004 and 2008 at the WFDF World Ultimate Championships. In 2011, Furious George was inducted into the Canadian Ultimate Hall of Fame.

== Current roster ==
(As of 2026).

Player name	Jersey number	Hometown
Andrew van den Driesen	55	Burnaby, BC
Bryn McColl	25	Vancouver, BC
David Colic	9	Ottawa ON
Devon Bringeland-Powell	88	Vancouver, BC
Jack Ponton	5	Vancouver, BC
Jonah Lee-Ash	50	Vancouver, BC
Jordan McGregor	21	Ottawa ON
Joshua Fok	00	Vancouver, BC
Kai O'Donnell	10	Vancouver, BC
Kevin Underhill	89	Vancouver, BC
Landon Lavoie	7	Calgary, AB
Lochlan Margison	2	Victoria Bc
Malcolm Bryson	45	Sechelt, BC
Malik Auger-Semmar	71	Montreal,QC
Mikael Zappetti	69	Toronto, ON
Miles Wong	32	Toronto, ON
Morgan Hibbert	8	Vancouver, BC
Neo Debroux	87	Vancouver, BC
Nyle Lebbell	1	Roberts Creek, BC
Peter Yu	22	Vancouver, BC
Quinn Snider	98	Winnipeg, MB
Rex Yuen	11	Burnaby, BC
Ricky McLeod	3	Port Coquitlam
Ricky Tran	12	Vancouver, BC
Sam But	26	Richmond, BC
Simón Ramírez Ortiz	14	Medellín, Colombia
Thomas Deller	42	Bairnsdale, Aus
Tim Tsang	16	Vancouver, BC
Toly Vasilyev	18	Leningrad, USSR
Vince Bulloch	99	Toronto, ON
