= World Flying Disc Federation =

International governing body of flying disc sports

- Sport: Flying disc sports
- Category: Ultimate, Beach Ultimate, Disc Golf, Guts, Double Disc Court, Freestyle
- Jurisdiction: International
- Abbreviation: WFDF
- Founded: 1985
- Headquarters: Colorado Springs, Colorado, US

Official website
- wfdf.sport

The World Flying Disc Federation (WFDF) is the international governing body for flying disc sports, with responsibility for sanctioning world championship events, establishing uniform rules, setting of standards for and recording of world records. WFDF is a federation of member associations which represent flying disc sports and their athletes in 114 countries. The organization holds recognition from the International Olympic Committee (IOC) and International Paralympic Committee, and is a member of the Association of IOC Recognised International Sports Federations (ARISF), GAISF, and the International World Games Association (IWGA). WFDF operates as a registered not-for-profit 501(c)(3) corporation in the state of Colorado, U.S.

== Membership ==
WFDF was formed in 1985 as a not-for-profit corporation and has member associations representing flying disc sports in countries across Africa, Asia, Australia, Europe, North America, the Caribbean, and South America. The federation has distinguishes three categories of membership: national members, provisional members and associate members.

National members are defined as: flying disc associations that is the governing body for Disc Games solely within a single national boundary.

To be approved as a national member by WFDF, an organization must:

1. Be organized with bylaws acceptable to WFDF;
2. Operate under the rules, policies, and programs which are in compliance with all agreements to which WFDF is a party;
3. Be open to participation without regard to race, color, religion, national origin, politics, sex, or sexual orientation;
4. Represent a minimum of 50 individual disc players who are members of its organization (“Constituents”) in one or more Disc Sports;
5. Hold an annual meeting and/or have another representative mechanism for its Constituents to elect a board of directors;
6. Fairly represent the interests of Constituents for all Disc Games within the country; and
7. Pay dues to WFDF as established by the Congress, and report annually regarding the number of its Constituents per the requirements as established by the Board of Directors (the “Census”).

Provisional members are those flying disc associations that function as the governing body for all disc games within a national boundary but are yet to meet the criteria outlined by WFDF to be a National Member.

Associate members are those with ties to disc sports but are not national governing bodies. They may include not-for-profit organizations that provide services to disc sports or which represent particular disc sports organizations.

=== Members by regions ===
As of 12 July, 2025

There are currently 122 members (96 national members and 26 provisional members) and two associate members, each belonging to their respective continental associations.

Continental associations are the central organizing bodies recognized by WFDF for disc sport events and promotion within a region continental region. These associations are responsible for coordinating matters of common interest of the members of their continent with WFDF.

Number	Region	Countries (regular and provisional members)
1	Africa	15+4=19
2	Asia-Pacific	24+8=32
3	Europe	40+6=46
4	Americas	18+7=25
Total	World	122

==== African Flying Disc Federation (AAFDF) ====
There are 15 WFDF regular members and 4 provisional members in Africa:

Regular members:

- Botswana – Gaborone Ultimate Community
- Ivory Coast – Fédération Ivoirienne De Frisbee
- Democratic Republic of the Congo – Federation Congolaise de Disque Volant
- Egypt – Egyptian Ultimate Players Association
- Ethiopia – Ethiopia Ultimate
- Madagascar – Malagasy Ultimate Disc League
- Mali – Association Malienne de Flying Disc
- Mauritius – Mauritius Ultimate Frisbee
- Morocco – The Moroccan Flying Disc Association
- Mozambique – Mozambique Ultimate
- Nigeria – Abuja Ultimate Frisbee Group
- Senegal – Senegal Ultimate
- South Africa – South African Flying Disc Association
- Uganda – Uganda Ultimate Frisbee Association
- Zimbabwe – HIS group

Provisional members:

- Kenya – Kenya Flying Disc Association
- Malawi – Malawi Flying Disc Federation
- Rwanda – Rwanda Ultimate Frisbee Association
- Tanzania – Tanzanian Flying Disc Association

==== Asia Oceania Flying Disc Federation (AOFDF) ====
There are 26 WFDF national members and 9 provisional members in Asia and Oceania:

National members:

- Australia – Australian Flying Disc Association
- China – Chinese Flying Disc Administrative Committee
- Guam – Guam Ultimate For All
- Hong Kong – Flying Disc Federation of Hong Kong, China
- India – Flying Disc Sports Federation India
- Indonesia – Indonesian Ultimate Players Association
- Iran – Flying Disc Association of the Islamic Republic of Iran
- Japan – Japan Flying Disc Association
- Kuwait – Kuwait Flying Disc Federation
- Kyrgyzstan – Frisbee Federation of the Kyrgyz Republic
- Lebanon – Lebanese Flying Disc Association
- Malaysia – Malaysia Flying Disc Association
- Maldives – Maldives Flying Disc Federation
- Mongolia – Mongolian Flying Disc Federation
- New Zealand – New Zealand Ultimate
- Palestine – Palestine Flying Disc Association
- Philippines – Philippine Flying Disc Association
- Saudi Arabia – The Saudi Flying Disc Committee
- Singapore – Singapore Flying Disc Association
- South Korea – Korea Ultimate Players Association
- Chinese Taipei – Chinese Taipei Flying Disc Association
- Thailand] – Flying Disc Association of Thailand
- Turkmenistan – Turkmenistan Flying Disc Public Union
- United Arab Emirates – United Arab Ultimate Association
- Vietnam – Hanoi Ultimate Club

Provisional members:

- Afghanistan – Afghanistan Frisbee Federation
- Bahrain – Bahrain Flying Disc Association
- Brunei – Brunei Flying Disc Association
- Cambodia – Cambodia Flying Disc Association
- Pakistan – Pakistan Flying Disc Federation
- Jordan – Jordan Flying Disc Federation
- Kazakhstan – Kazakhstan Flying Disc Federation
- Qatar – Qatar Ultimate Frisbee
- Sri Lanka – Sri Lankan Flying Disc Association

==== European Flying Disc Federation (EFDF) and European Ultimate Federation (EUF) ====
There are 40 WFDF national members, 4 provisional members, and 2 suspended members in Europe:

National members:

- Albania – Albania Flying Disc Federation
- Austria – Österreichischer Frisbee-Sport Verband
- Azerbaijan – Ultimate Azerbaijan Players Union
- Belgium – Belgian Flying Disc Federation
- Czech Republic – Czech Association for Flying Disc
- Denmark – Dansk Frisbee Sport Union
- Estonia – Estonian Flying Disc Federation
- Finland – Finnish Flying Disc Association
- France – Fédération Flying Disc France
- Georgia – Georgian Flying Disc Federation
- Germany – Deutscher Frisbeesport-Verband
- Great Britain – UK Ultimate
- Greece – Greece Hellas Sport for All
- Hungary – Hungarian Flying Disc Federation
- Iceland – Frisbee Sport Federation of Iceland
- Ireland – Irish Flying Disc Association
- Israel – Israeli Flying Discs Association
- Italy – Federazione Italiana Giochi e Sport Tradizionali
- Latvia – Latvian Flying Disc Federation
- Lithuania – Lithuanian Flying Disc Federation
- Luxembourg – Luxembourg Flying Disc Federation
- Malta – Malta Sport for All
- Netherlands – Nederlandse Frisbee Bond
- Norway – Norwegian Federations for the American Sports
- Poland – Polskie Stowarzyszenie Graczy Ultimate
- Portugal – Associação Portuguesa de Ultimate e Desportos de Disco
- Serbia – Serbian Ultimate Frisbee
- Slovakia – Slovak Association of Frisbee
- Slovenia – Frizbi zveza Slovenije
- Spain – Federación Española de Disco Volador
- Sweden – Swedish Flying Disc Federation
- Switzerland – Swiss Disc Sports
- Turkey – Turkish Flying Disc Association
- Ukraine – Ukrainian Flying Disk Federation

Provisional members:

- Armenia – Armenian National Frisbee Federation
- Bulgaria – Bulgarian Flying Disc Federation
- Croatia – Croatian Flying Disc Federation
- Moldova – Moldovan Flying Disc Federation
- Romania – Romanian Flying Disc Association

Suspended members:

- Belarus – Belarusian Flying Disc Federation
- Russia – Russian Flying Disc Federation

==== Pan American Flying Disc Federation (PAFDF) ====
There are 17 WFDF national members and 7 provisional members in the Americas:

National members:

- Argentina – Asociación de Deportes del Disco Volador de la Republica Argentina
- Barbados – Barbados Hat
- Bermuda – Bermuda Ultimate Frisbee Federation
- Canada – Ultimate Canada
- Colombia – Federación Colombiana de Disco Volador
- Cuba – Cuba Ultimate Frisbee
- Dominican Republic – Asociacion Dominicana de Jugadores de Ultimate
- Ecuador – Ecuador Ultimate
- El Salvador – San Salvador Ultimate Frisbee
- Guatemala – Guatemala City Ultimate Frisbee
- Haiti – Haiti Flying Disc
- Jamaica – Jamaica Ultimate
- Mexico – Ultimate México
- Panama – Asociacion de Ultimate – Frisbee de Panamá
- Peru – Peru Ultimate
- Puerto Rico – Extreme Flydisk Ultimate Association
- United States – USA Ultimate
- Venezuela – Venezuelan Ultimate Association

Provisional members:

- Bolivia – Bolivian Flying Disc Association
- Cayman Islands – Cayman Islands Ultimate Association
- Chile – Asociación Chilena de Ultimate
- Costa Rica – Costa Rican Ultimate Frisbee Team
- Nicaragua – Federación de Disco Volador de Nicaragua
- Uruguay – Ultimate Frisbee Uruguay
- United States Virgin Islands – US Virgin Islands Ultimate

== History ==
Flying disc sport rose with the invention of the plastic Frisbee, it celebrated its 60th anniversary in 2017. The first frisbee organization was the International Frisbee Tournament (IFT), established in the Midwestern U.S. town of Eagle Harbor in 1958. It featured Guts Frisbee along with distance and accuracy competition. The early years of international flying disc play were dominated by the influence of the International Frisbee Association (IFA) which was founded by Ed Headrick in 1967 as the promotional arm of the Wham-O Manufacturing Company. Many of the international affiliates began as Wham-O distributorships that sponsored tours of well-known Frisbee athletes. Several groups of individual disc event stars like Ken Westerfield and Jim Kenner touring Canada in 1972. The brothers Jens and Erwin Velasquez and the team of Peter Bloeme and Dan "Stork" Roddick made several tours of Scandinavia and the rest of Europe in the mid-1970s; Jo Cahow and Stork went to Australia and Japan in 1976 and Victor Malafronte and Monica Lou toured Japan around the same time. Stork—starting as head of the sports marketing arm of the U.S.-based Wham-O in 1975—played a crucial role in encouraging the establishment of national flying disc associations (FDAs) in Sweden, Japan, Australia, and in many of the countries of Western Europe. The FDAs began with freestyle and accuracy competitions but as Ultimate and disc golf caught on, the associations began to broaden their focus.

The concept of an independent world organization for the development and coordination of all of the disc disciplines began in 1980 at an Atlanta, Georgia, meeting of 40 international disc organizers. A loose federation led by Jim Powers was formed from that meeting but never took off. The following year, the relatively well-established national flying disc associations of Europe formed the European Flying Disc Federation (EFDF). In 1983 Wham-O was sold to Kransco and the IFA was disbanded. Spurred on by the demise of the IFA, Stork called a meeting at the US Open Overall Championships in La Mirada, California. A plan was presented by Charlie Mead of England and a formal decision was made to establish a worldwide disc association in Örebro, Sweden during the 1984 European Overall Championships. This decision was confirmed later that year by other flying disc countries in Lucerne, Switzerland, during the World Ultimate and Guts Championships, and thus the World Flying Disc Federation (WFDF) was born.

The first WFDF Congress was held in Helsingborg, Sweden in July 1985, where the first set of statutes was adopted and the first board was elected. The first president was Charlie Mead (England), the first secretary Johan Lindgren (Sweden) and the first treasurer Brendan Nolan (Ireland). Membership was composed of the national flying disc associations and US-oriented organizations such as the Ultimate Players Association, Freestyle Players Associations, and Guts Players Association. Committees were established to oversee international play and rules for each of the disc disciplines. Over the remainder of the 1980s, WFDF took on an increasing role in overseeing and promoting international disc tournaments with Stork as president and Lindgren as secretary-treasurer.

In 1992, Robert L. "Nob" Rauch was elected President of WFDF and Juha Jalovaara become chair of the Ultimate Committee. Over the next two years, WFDF was reorganized to better reflect the increasing growth of Ultimate and the diversity of WFDF's membership. The disc committee structure was simplified into a broad category of team sports (Ultimate and Guts) and individual events (golf and the overall disciplines). The role of the Rules Committee was expanded, headed by Stork, to ensure consistency and an annual rules book was printed. With a variety of representation, the categories of membership were further defined, with national associations able to join as regular, associate, or provisional (non-paying) members depending on level of participation and resources. WFDF's corporate standing was reorganized and incorporated in Colorado, obtaining US tax-exempt status. WFDF, with a fairly nominal budget, found help with the increasing use of e-mail that permitted reasonable communication and coordination. In 1994, the application to join the International World Games Association (IWGA)—championed by Fumio "Moro" Morooka of Japan—was prepared and eventually accepted by the IWGA leading to Ultimate's participation in the 2001 World Games in Akita, Japan, and in each of the subsequent competitions.

In May 2013, under the leadership WFDF President Robert L. "Nob" Rauch, WFDF was granted provisional recognition by the International Olympic Committee and it is now one of 42 sports that are members of the Association of IOC Recognised International Sports Federations.

Due to the impact of the global COVID-19 pandemic, WFDF canceled all its world championship events in both 2020 and 2021. It is planning to recommence world championship events in Ultimate, Beach ultimate, Disc Golf, and Overall in 2022, and to participate in The World Games championships in Birmingham, Alabama, U.S. in July 2022 that had been postponed from 2021.

== Disciplines ==
=== Team Sports ===
==== Ultimate ====
Ultimate is WFDF's largest and most widely played discipline, contested by mixed-gender, open, and women’s teams of seven players on a rectangular field. The sport includes several variants:

- Outdoor Ultimate - The traditional 7-on-7 format played on grass fields
- Indoor Ultimate - Modified rules for gymnasium play
- Beach Ultimate - Played on sand with reduced team sizes and modified field dimensions

Ultimate governance has been part of WFDF since its founding in 1985. The discipline is featured in The World Games and is considered WFDF's flagship sport for potential Olympic inclusion.

==== Guts ====
Guts is a fast-paced team sport where opposing teams attempt to throw a disc past their opponents at high velocity. Players must catch or deflect throws to prevent scoring.

=== Individual Disciplines ===
==== Disc Golf ====
Disc golf involves throwing specialized discs toward elevated metal baskets in the fewest throws possible, similar to traditional golf. It is one of the fastest-growing flying disc sports and features in The World Games.

==== Freestyle ====
Freestyle is an artistic discipline where individuals or pairs perform choreographed routines involving creative catches, throws, and manipulations of the disc judged on technical skill, artistic impression, and difficulty.

==== Field Events ====
Field events comprise several individual accuracy and distance disciplines:

- Distance - Maximum throwing distance competition
- Accuracy - Throwing precision at designated targets
- Self Caught Flight (SCF) - Combination of distance and catching ability
- Discathon - Distance running event while throwing and catching a disc These events are contested in the Overall competition format.

==== Overall ====
The Overall competition combines multiple individual disciplines to crown the most complete flying disc athlete. Competitors participate in distance, accuracy, freestyle, and other events with rankings determined by cumulative performance.

==== Double Disc Court ====
Double Disc Court is a discipline where two teams simultaneously throw two discs at each other across parallel courts, attempting to cause the opposing team to drop or fail to throw a disc.

== International events ==
- World Ultimate Championships
- World Under-24 Ultimate Championships
- World Junior Ultimate Championships
- World Beach Ultimate Championships

== Presidents ==
Name	Nationality	From	To
Charlie Mead	Great Britain	1985	1986
Daniel "Stork" Roddick	United States	1987	1991
Robert L. "Nob" Rauch	United States	1992	1994
Bill Wright	United States	1995	2004
Juha Jalovaara	Finland	2005	2008
Jonathan Potts	Australia	2009	2010
Robert L. "Nob" Rauch	United States	2011	Present

== Events and Event results ==
WFDF organizes and sanctions world championship events across multiple flying disc disciplines, serving as the premier international competitions for each sport. The federation's championship structure includes both national team and club team competitions, with events held on rotating cycles to accommodate the global flying disc community.

=== Ultimate Championships ===
WFDF conducts several categories of Ultimate world championships:

==== World Ultimate and Guts Championships (WUGC) ====
The World Ultimate and Guts Championships feature national teams competing in Ultimate and Guts disciplines. Held every four years, WUGC represents the highest level of international competition, with teams qualifying through continental championships. The event includes Open (Men's), Women's, Mixed, Masters, and Junior divisions for Ultimate, alongside Open and Women's Guts competitions.

Cincinnati, Ohio, U.S., 23–31 July 2022

Year 2022	(gold) Gold	(silver) Silver	(bronze) Bronze	Spirit
Open	New York PoNY (United States)	Raleigh Ring of Fire (United States)	Clapham (United Kingdom)	Tokyo Buzz Bullets (Japan)
Women's	Medellín Revolution (Colombia)	SF Fury (United States)	Raleigh Phoenix (United States)	Tokyo MUD (Japan)
Mixed	Seattle Mixtape (United States)	Vancouver Red Flag (Canada)	Brisbane Lunchbox (Australia)	Colorado (Germany)

Cincinnati, Ohio, U.S., 14–21 July 2018

Year 2018	(gold) Gold	(silver) Silver	(bronze) Bronze	(bronze) Bronze
Open	SF Revolver (United States)	Sydney Colony (Australia)	Toronto GOAT (Canada)	Austin Doublewide (United States)
Women's	Seattle Riot (United States)	Medellín Revolution (Colombia)	Boston Brute Squad (United States)	Denver Molly Brown (United States)
Mixed	Seattle BFG (United States)	Boston Slow White (United States)	Philadelphia AMP (United States)	Boston Wild Card (United States)

Winnipeg, Manitoba, Canada, 29 July - 4 August 2018

Year 2018	(gold) Gold	(silver) Silver	(bronze) Bronze
Masters Men	Boneyard (United States)	All Bashed Out (United States)	Johnny Encore (United States)
Masters Women	iRot (United States)	Mu-Syozoku (Japan)	Ripe (United States)
Masters Mixed	Molasses Disaster (United States)	512 (United States)	SF Bridge Club (United States)
Grandmasters Men	Johnny Walker (United States)	Surly (United States)	Tombstone (Canada)

Lecco, Italy, 2–9 August 2014

Year 2014	(gold) Gold	(silver) Silver	(bronze) Bronze
Open	Revolver (United States)	Sockeye (United States)	Johnny Bravo (United States)
Women's	Seattle Riot (United States)	Fury (United States)	Scandal (United States)
Mixed	Drag'n Thrust (United States)	Polar Bears (United States)	The Ghosts (United States)
Masters	Boneyard (United States)	FIGJAM (Canada)	Johnny Encore (United States)
Women's Masters	Vintage (Canada)	Godiva (United States)	Golden Girls (Germany)

Prague, Czech Republic, 3–10 July 2010

Year 2010	(gold) Gold	(silver) Silver	(bronze) Bronze
Open	Revolver (United States)	Sockeye (United States)	Buzz Bullets (Japan)
Women's	Fury (United States)	UNO (Japan)	Seattle Riot (United States)
Mixed	Chad Larson Experience (United States)	ONYX (Canada)	Mental Toss Flycoons (United States)
Masters	Troubled Past (United States)	Surly (United States)	Eastern Greys (Australia)

Perth, Australia, 11–18 November 2006

Year 2006	(gold) Gold	(silver) Silver	(bronze) Bronze
Open	Buzz Bullets (Japan)	Thong (Australia)	Chilly (Australia)
Women's	MUD (Japan)	UNO (Japan)	Huck (Japan)
Mixed	Team Fisher Price (Canada)	Brass Monkey (United States)	Slow White and the Seven Dwarfs (United States)
Masters	Vigi (Japan)	One Last Ditch Shot at Glory (United States)	Eastern Greys (Australia)

Honolulu, US, 4–10 August 2002

Year 2002	(gold) Gold	(silver) Silver	(bronze) Bronze
Open	Condors (United States)	Death Or Glory (United States)	Sockeye (United States)
Women's	Seattle Riot (United States)	Ozone (United States)	Lady Godiva (United States)
Mixed	Donner Party (United States)	Hang Time	Trigger Hippy
Masters	KWA	Skeleton Crew	Old And in the Way

St. Andrews, Scotland, 12–20 August 1999

Year 1999	(gold) Gold	(silver) Silver	(bronze) Bronze
Open	DoG (United States)	Liquidisc (Finland)	Condors (United States)
Women's	Women on the Verge (United States)	Schwa (United States)	Spirals (Japan)
Mixed	Red Fish Blue Fish (United States)	Osaka Nato (Japan)	RippIT (United States)
Masters	Cigar (United States)	Return of the Red Eye (Australia)	Tempus Fugit (United States)

Vancouver Canada, 27 July – 2 August 1997

Year 1997	(gold) Gold	(silver) Silver	(bronze) Bronze
Open	Sockeye (United States)	Double Happiness (United States)	Furious George (Canada)
Women's	Women on the Verge (United States)	Schwa (United States)	Lady Godiva (United States)
Masters	Beyonders (United States)	Tempus Fugit (United States)	Gamecock (Canada)

Millfield United Kingdom, 22–29 July 1995

Year 1995	(gold) Gold	(silver) Silver	(bronze) Bronze
Open	Double Happiness (United States)	DoG (United States)	NYC (United States)
Women's	Women on the Verge (United States)	Ozone (United States)	Red Lights (Netherlands)
Masters	Seven Sages (United States)	Gummibears (Germany)	Princeton Alumni (United States)

Madison, Wisconsin US, 24–31 July 1993

Year 1993	(gold) Gold	(silver) Silver	(bronze) Bronze
Open	New York Ultimate (United States)	Double Happiness (United States)	Rhino Slam! (United States)
Women's	Maine-iacs (United States)	Lady Godiva (United States)	Women on the Verge (United States)
Masters	Seven Sages (United States)	Hapa Haolies (United States)	Rude Boys (United States)

Toronto Canada, 22–28 July 1991

Year 1991	(gold) Gold	(silver) Silver	(bronze) Bronze
Open	New York (United States)	First Time Gary (United States)	Windy City (United States)
Women's	Maine-iacs (United States)	Lady Godiva (United States)	Lady Condors (United States)
Masters	Three Stages (United States)	Third Coast Ultimate (United States)	Mo' Better Masters (United States)

Cologne Germany, 26–30 July 1989

Year 1989	(gold) Gold	(silver) Silver	(bronze) Bronze
Open	Philmore (United States)	Elvis (United States)	Looney Tunes (United States)
Women's	Lady Condors (United States)	Smithereens (United States)	Stenungsunds FC (Sweden)

=== International World Games Ultimate Championship ===
Kaohsiung Taiwan, 19–21 July 2009

(gold) United States

(silver) Japan

(bronze) Australia

=== WFDF 2009 World Overall Flying Disc championships ===
Jacksonville, Florida, 9–12 July 2009

Open Division

(gold) Conrad Damon – United States

(silver) Jack Cooksey – United States

(bronze) Harvey Brandt – United States

Women's Division

(gold) Mary Lowry – United States

(silver) Stina Persson – SWE

(bronze) Marygrace Sorrentino – United States

=== WFDF World Ultimate and Guts Championship (WUGC) ===
Gold Coast, Australia, 31 August – 7 September 2024

2024	(gold) Gold	(silver) Silver	(bronze) Bronze
Open	United States	Japan	Australia
Women's	United States	Colombia	Australia
Mixed	United States	Canada	France
Guts Open	United States #1	Japan #1	United States #2
Guts Women's	Japan	Chinese Taipei	Thailand #1

London, Great Britain, 18–25 June 2016

2016	Spirit	(gold) Gold	(silver) Silver	(bronze) Bronze
Men's	New Zealand	United States	Japan	Australia
Women's	India	United States	Colombia	Canada
Mixed	Finland	United States	Australia	Canada
Masters Men	New Zealand	United States	Canada	Great Britain
Masters Women's	New Zealand	United States	Canada	Australia
Guts	United States	United States	Japan	Great Britain

Sakai, Japan, 7–14 July 2012

2012	(gold) Gold	(silver) Silver	(bronze) Bronze
Open	United States	Great Britain	Canada
Women's	Japan	United States	Canada
Mixed	Canada	Australia	Japan
Open Masters	Canada	Australia	Japan
Women's Masters	United States	Canada	Japan
Guts	Japan (Red)	United States	Japan (White)

Vancouver, Canada, 2–9 August 2008

2008	(gold) Gold	(silver) Silver	(bronze) Bronze
Open	Canada	United States	Japan
Women's	United States	Japan	Canada
Mixed	Canada	Japan	United States
Masters	United States	Canada	New Zealand
Junior Open	United States	Canada	Germany
Junior Girls	Japan	Australia	United States
Guts	United States (Red)	Japan (White)	Japan (Red)

Turku, Finland, 1–7 August 2004

2004	(gold) Gold	(silver) Silver	(bronze) Bronze
Open	Canada	United States	Australia
Women's	Canada	Finland	United States
Mixed	United States	Canada	New Zealand
Masters	United States	Canada	Great Britain
Junior Open	United States	Canada	Germany
Junior Girls	Canada	United States	Sweden

Heilbronn, Germany, 12–20 August 2000

2000	(gold) Gold	(silver) Silver	(bronze) Bronze
Open	United States	Sweden	Canada
Women's	Canada	Japan	Finland
Mixed	United States	Canada	Finland
Masters	United States	Germany	Canada
Junior Open	Sweden	Canada	United States
Junior Girls	United States	Canada	Finland

Blaine, Minnesota, US, 15–22 August 1998

1998	(gold) Gold	(silver) Silver	(bronze) Bronze
Open	Canada	Japan	United States
Women's	United States	Japan	Canada
Mixed	Canada	United States	Germany
Masters	Canada	United States	Netherlands
Junior	United States	Sweden	Canada

Jönköping, Sweden, 10–17 August 1996

1996	(gold) Gold	(silver) Silver	(bronze) Bronze
Open	United States	Sweden	Finland
Women's	Sweden	United States	Japan
Masters	Sweden	Canada	United States
Junior	Sweden	Germany	United States

Colchester, United Kingdom, 21–28 August 1994

1994	(gold) Gold	(silver) Silver	(bronze) Bronze
Open	United States	Sweden	Canada
Women's	United States	Netherlands	Canada
Masters	United States	Canada	Germany
Junior	Sweden	United States	Germany

Utsunomiya, Japan, 17–23 August 1992

1992	(gold) Gold	(silver) Silver	(bronze) Bronze
Open	Sweden	Canada	Japan
Women's	Japan	Sweden	United States
Masters	United States	Germany	Japan
Junior	Chinese Taipei	Japan	

Oslo, Norway, 8–14 July 1990

1990	(gold) Gold	(silver) Silver	(bronze) Bronze
Open	United States	Sweden	Finland
Women's	United States	Sweden	Finland
Masters	United States	Canada	Germany
Junior	Sweden	Finland	United States

Leuven, Belgium, 29 August – 3 September 1988

1988	(gold) Gold	(silver) Silver	(bronze) Bronze
Open	United States	Finland	Sweden
Women's	United States	Netherlands	Sweden
Junior	Sweden	Finland	United States

Colchester, United Kingdom, 25–31 August 1986

1986	(gold) Gold	(silver) Silver	(bronze) Bronze
Open	United States	Sweden	West Germany
Women's	United States	Great Britain	Finland
Junior	Sweden	Finland	Great Britain

Lucerne, Switzerland, 2–9 September 1984

1984	(gold) Gold	(silver) Silver	(bronze) Bronze
Open	United States	Sweden	Finland
Women's	Finland	Sweden	Austria
Junior	Sweden	Austria	

Gothenburg, Sweden, 29 August – 3 September 1983

1983	(gold) Gold	(silver) Silver	(bronze) Bronze
Open	United States	Finland	Sweden
Women's	United States	Finland	Sweden
Junior	Finland	United States	Austria

== See also ==
- Flying disc at the World Games
- Disc golf

== Sources ==
- WFDF Rankings Page
- WFDF Disc Ultimate World Rankings
- WUCC 2010
- World Championship Results
- World Club Championship Results
