= Cutter (surname) =

Cutter is a surname. The name comes from the occupation of cloth cutter, and was Latinised as Cissor.

Notable people with the surname include:

- Ammi Ruhamah Cutter (minister) (1705–1746), American minister
- Benjamin Cutter (1857–1910), American composer
- Bowman Cutter, American economist, political thinker and businessman
- Carrie Cutter, DC Comics character known as Cupid
- Charles Ammi Cutter (1837–1903), American librarian
- Daniel Bateman Cutter (1808–1889), American politician and physician from New Hampshire
- Elizabeth Cutter (1929–2010), Scottish professor
- Ephraim Cutter (1832–1917), American physician
- George W. Cutter (born 1849, date of death unknown), American sailor
- George Washington Cutter (died 1865), American poet
- Irving Samuel Cutter, American doctor, teacher of medicine and medical journalist
- Kiki Cutter (born 1949), American alpine ski racer
- Kirtland Cutter (1860–1939), American architect
- Leonard R. Cutter (1825–1894), American politician
- Lise Cutter (born 1959), American actress
- Murray Cutter (1902–1983) American orchestrator
- R. Ammi Cutter (1902–1993), justice of the Massachusetts Supreme Judicial Court
- Slade Cutter (1911–2005), American naval officer
- Stephanie Cutter (born 1968), American political consultant
- William Richard Cutter (1847–1918), American historian and genealogist
- Shawn Cutter (born 1980), American Navy, Enlisted
