= Cutting (surname) =

Cutting is a surname. Notable people with the surname include:

- Alastair Cutting (born 1960), Church of England Archdeacon
- Andy Cutting (born 1969), English folk musician and composer
- Austin Cutting (born 1996), American football player
- Ben Cutting (born 1987), Australian cricketer
- Bronson M. Cutting (1888–1935), U.S. Senator from New Mexico, publisher and military attaché
- Charles Suydam Cutting (1889–1972), American explorer, naturalist, society figure, philanthropist, and author
- Doug Cutting, open-source search advocate
- Elise Justine Bayard Cutting (1823–1853), American poet
- Francis B. Cutting (1804–1870), U.S. Representative from New York
- Francis Cutting (c. 1550–1595/6), English lutenist and composer
- Fred Cutting (1921–1997), English footballer
- Harmon S. Cutting (1830–1884), American mayor of Buffalo, New York
- Henry C. Cutting (1870–?), California entrepreneur
- Iris Margaret Cutting (1902–1988), English born biographer and writer
- Jack Cutting (disambiguation)
- James Cutting (disambiguation)
- Joe Cutting (1885–?), American college football player and coach
- John Cutting (disambiguation)
- Jonas Cutting (1800–1876), American judge
- Justine Bayard Cutting (1879–1975), American educator
- Laurie Cutting, American psychologist
- Mary Stewart Cutting (1851–1928), American author and suffragist
- Olivia Peyton Murray Cutting (1855–1949), American socialite
- Robert Cutting (disambiguation)
- Robbie Cutting (born 2001), English Philosopher
- Skip Cutting (born 1946), American cyclist
- Stan Cutting (1914–2004), English footballer who played for Southampton and Exeter City
- Ted Cutting (1926–2012), British automotive engineer
- William Cutting (1832–1897), American lawyer
- William Bayard Cutting (1850–1912), American sugar beet refiner and financier
- William Bayard Cutting Jr. (1878–1910), American diplomat
- Windsor C. Cutting (1907–1972), American physician
