= Kuter =

Kuter is a surname. Notable people with the surname include:

- Kay E. Kuter (1925–2003), American actor
- Laurence S. Kuter (1905–1979), United States Air Force general
- Leo K. Kuter (1897–1970), American film art director
- Patrycja Kuter (born 1993), Polish para-cyclist

== See also ==
- Kuter Trophy
- Kutter
- Kotter
- Cutter
- Cuter
