= Woodcutting =

Woodcutting may refer to:

- Logging - cutting and loading of trees or logs onto trucks or skeleton cars
- Woodcut, a relief printing technique in printmaking
- Coppicing, a traditional method of woodland management

A woodcutter may refer to:

- A gatherer of firewood
- A lumberjack
- An artist producing woodcuts

== See also ==
- Cutting (disambiguation)
- Cutter (disambiguation)
- Wood (disambiguation)
