= University of Wisconsin–Madison Hodags =

College ultimate frisbee team

- Sport: Ultimate
- Founded: 1977
- Division: USAU D1 College Men
- Region: North Central
- Championships: 2003, 2007, 2008
- Website: https://www.hodaglove.org

The University of Wisconsin–Madison Ultimate Frisbee team was founded in the 1976–1977 school year. The Hodags participate in the USA Ultimate D1 Men's College Division with notable successes including Championships in 2003, 2007, and 2008 and Dan Heijmen winning the Callahan award in 2007 along with a record-setting 23 consecutive appearances at the USAU D1 Men's College Championship Tournament between 2000 and 2022.

Despite ultimate frisbee being a club sport and fighting for legitimacy as a university recognized and funded NCAA sport, the Hodags train and practice regularly at UW–Madison and external facilities and travel and compete nationally at tournaments throughout the school year with the primary season being in the Spring. Hodag games and highlights have been televised by the CBS Sports Network between 2003 and 2012 and ESPN from 2013 through today.

== History ==
=== Team name origin ===
At the recommendation of Robert Crowley and Sean Hart in the 1994 season, the men's ultimate team adopted the name the Hodags, inspired by the fearsome critter in American folklore from Rhinelander, WI. The phrase "Hodag Love" was coined by Sam Thomas in that same year. Prior to 1994, the team went by various names such as the Madison Frisbee Club (MFC) and Disconsin.

=== Early years (1976–1980) ===
As a student at UW–Madison, Gary Stroick read a book about ultimate frisbee and decided to start a team at the university with his roommate Kent Archie. Gary and Kent posted flyers around campus and had the inaugural team meeting on September 29, 1976, at the Memorial Union, which is considered the first instance of organized ultimate frisbee in Madison, Wisconsin. The team formed and received funding from the Intramural Office within University Sports Club department at UW-Madison.

The sport of ultimate frisbee originated in 1968 in a summer program at Northfield Mount Hermon School, MA with influence from Amherst College student Jared Kass; as a student, Joel Silver brought the game from the Mount Hermon summer program to Columbia High School, NJ and formed the first school team in the same year with Bernard "Buzz" Hellring and Johnny Hines. In the early 1970s, high school graduates from Columbia High School started ultimate teams at colleges they attended (such as Jim Powers at Penn State University in 1974), and these individuals are referred to as the "Johnny Appleseeds" of ultimate and have since been inducted into the USA Ultimate Hall of Fame. Future president of the American Nuclear Society Andrew Klein learned and played ultimate at Penn State during his undergraduate studies in the mid-1970s before attending UW–Madison as a graduate student, where he and his wife Tracy Klein attended the aforementioned inaugural team meeting. Klein and Art Vawter (who also played ultimate before attending UW-Madison) were instrumental in teaching the new team disc skills and strategy. Klein went on to vouch for Midwest ultimate as the Ultimate Player Association's first Central Division Coordinator working closely with Tom "TK" Kennedy to draft the first UPA bylaws in August 1980 with wife Tracy being the first typist.

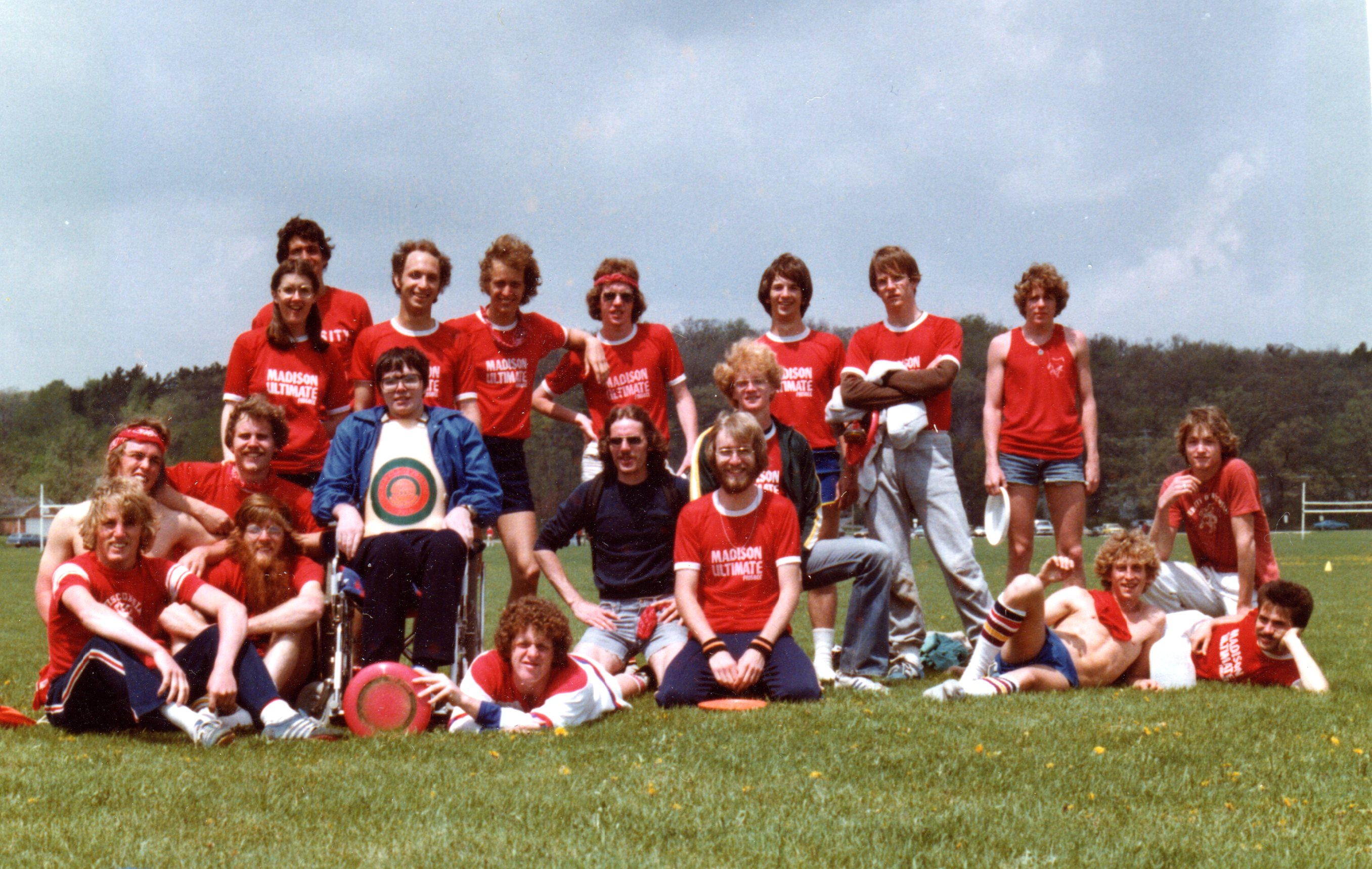
Team picture from the early years of the Madison Frisbee Club at UW-Madison

UW–Madison won its first game by one score against UW–Milwaukee in the Fall of 1977. The team is practicing multiple times per week centrally on campus and getting visibility in the news which provides an open, inviting recruiting pipeline in an era where tryouts did not occur to optimize team growth, though the intensity of practices and conditioning work causes self-vetting of new recruits. Early defensive strategy incorporated by Gary Stroick included playing person defense and a 2-3-2 zone which led to success for the team in the Wisconsin-Minnesota area.

John Ballsrud became a coach and statistician of the Madison Frisbee Club after a car accident paralyzed him from the waist down. Ballsrud went on to set the record for the wheelchair Maximum Distance Throw in 1979 and wheelchair Maximum Time Aloft in September 1983.

Mike Wohl was one of the standout players on MFC and considered one of the best players in the world in the late 1970s; Wohl went on to compete in the frisbee finals in the Rose Bowl in 1979

Starting in 1978, the UW–Madison team hosts an annual Wisconsin State Tournament on campus in late September over the next few years with college ultimate teams attending from all over Wisconsin; the Madison Frisbee Club takes first place in this tournament in the first three years. The team also hosts UPA Central Regionals at UW-Madison in 1978 and 1980.

MFC continues to compete at Central Regionals in November but never is able to qualify for Nationals.

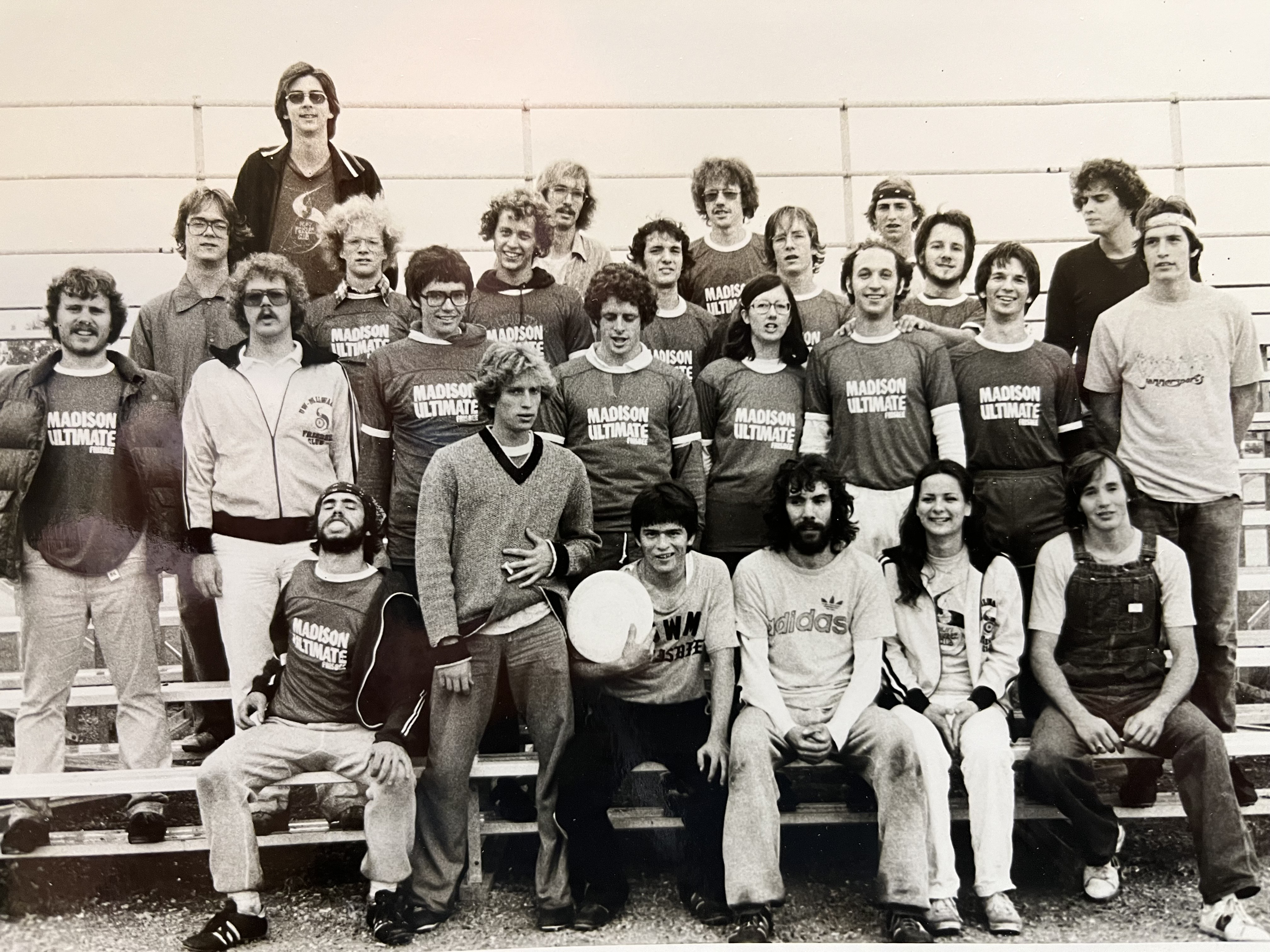
UW–Madison and UW–Milwaukee ultimate teams set a record for 17.5 hours of continuous play in 1978

Madison Frisbee Club briefly held a record for the longest continuous ultimate frisbee game in conjunction with the Milwaukee Frisbee Club in 1978 at Demetral Fields in Madison, WI as recorded by the (now defunct) International Frisbee Association where donations from the game benefited the Methodist Hospital Retirement Health Center.

=== 1980–1989 ===
With the departure of Andrew Klein from UW–Madison and the UPA as Central Region Coordinator at the beginnings of the 1980s, there is a significant lack of information on UW–Madison ultimate during this period without Klein's voice.

In 1981, MFC continues to play compete regionally at tournaments in the Midwest like the University of Wisconsin-Stout Ultimate Invitational Tournament in April. In this era, college teams would also compete against ultimate clubs not affiliated with colleges such as Chicago Windy City. There are also instances of individuals rostered for MFC who are not students at UW–Madison (which was not uncommon for other college ultimate teams as well) because an independent Madison ultimate club team not affiliated with UW–Madison was not established until the early 1990s.

After playing for MFC and earning Most Valuable Player every season from 1978-1982, Dave Jewell would coach the team from 1983-1987; Jewell was also one of the top professional freestylers in the world and played a big part in growing disc sports by organizing tournaments, school assemblies, and performances in front of the public eye.

Originally, the Madison Frisbee Club was open to all genders to play, but in 1984, Pam Hageny came from Cornell University's women's ultimate team The Wild Roses and started the UW–Madison women's ultimate team called the Mudeaters (after a player took a mouthful of Spring mud laying out), now known as Bella Donna, making MFC a men's team.

In the late 1980s, the team changed the name from Madison Frisbee Club to Disconsin.

In 1987, future Wisconsin Hodag Hall of Fame (WHHoF) inductee Brad "Zeus" Wendt, a rostered player for UW–Madison despite not being a student at the time, made a Cheesehead from a junked mattress that became a rivalry trophy with the University of Kansas Horror Zontals through 1993.

The UW–Madison Dave McClain Athletic Facility opens in 1988 which then serves as an essential indoor turf practice field for the team during the winter.

At the end of the 1989 season, Disconsin ranks 31st of 90 teams in the UPA College Open Division with a 15-8 season record while the Mudeaters ranks 4th of 20 teams in the UPA College Women's Division with a 5-2 season record. Brad Wendt's tireless effort promoting and organizing ultimate events through the mid-1990s and disc golf events over the next few decades along with playing for and coaching Disconsin would be critical for the rise and future successes of the Madison ultimate frisbee and disc golf scene, particularly the UW–Madison Men's Ultimate team.

=== 1990–1999 ===
In the Spring of 1990, Disconsin goes undefeated over Carleton College CUT, the Minneapolis Flying Terrapins, Macalester College, Winona State University Kling Onz, and others in the fourth annual Play Your Hearts Out Tournament hosted by Winona State University; Disconsin continues to compete within the Central Region against both college and non-college affiliated ultimate teams. Annually in April 1990 through 1997, UW–Madison Ultimate hosts the prominent Big Ten Open Tournament in Madison with Samson Sackett helping organize the initial tournaments. In April 1999, a new tournament called Midwesterns organized by Hodag Alumni Andy Pohl at UW-Madison overtakes the Big Ten tournament. UW-Madison qualifies for the UPA Men's College Nationals tournament for the first time in 1990 and takes 7th at the tournament in Phoenix, AZ with future Wisconsin Hodag Hall of Fame (WHHoF) inductees coach Brad "Zeus" Wendt and captain Samson "Sam" Sackett; this is the first recorded tournament that Disconsin traveled outside of the Central Region to play. In 1990, Disconsin finishes 11th in UPA Open collegiate rankings with a season record of 26-5 along with winning a Spirit of the Game Aware at Nationals. In 1992, the team finished 21st in the UPA Open collegiate rankings with a season record of 21-10. The team's best Nationals finishes of this decade are semifinals in 1996 and quarterfinals in 1997 along with appearances at Nationals in 1991, 1992, 1993, and 1994. At the 1994 UPA College Nationals, the Hodags were making themselves known as a defensive powerhouse being at the top of many defensive statistics. In the 1996 UPA College Nationals, the Hodags came into the tournament seeded in the bottom half of the 12 total teams; the implementation of a double-dump offense and superior athleticism on defense forced many confident upsets at Nationals, leading to the team being ranked 5th in the UPA College Open Rankings at the end of the season with a 32-6 record. In 1997, the Hodags finished 5th in the UPA College Open Rankings with a season record of 36-5. In 1998, the Hodags finished 19th in the UPA College Open Rankings with a season record of 20-9. In 1994, 1996, and 1997, alumni and future WHHoF inductee Jeff "Jethro" Yu wins UPA Men's Club Championships with Boston Death or Glory (DoG) in Lexington, Kentucky, Dallas, Texas, and at the Sarasota Polo Club in Sarasota, Florida, respectively.

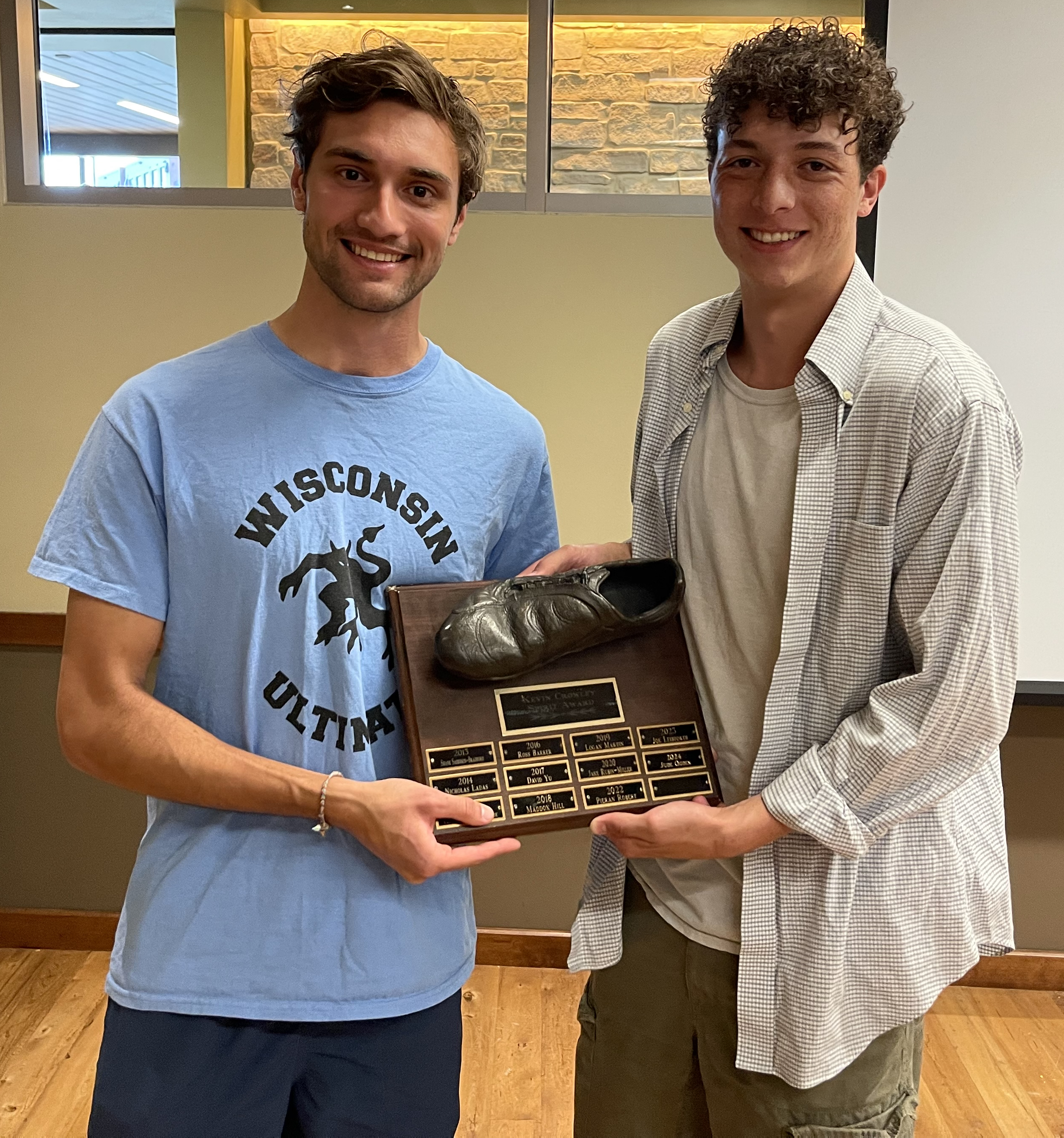
Previous award winners Joe Leibforth (left) and Pieran Robert (right) displaying the Kevin Crowley Spirit award plaque at the 2024 Hodag Alumni Weekend

Future WHHoF inductee Kevin Crowley captains the team in 1992 and 1993; unfortunately, cancer cut Crowley's ultimate career short with his passing at age 25 in 1995. His impact on the team inspired the annual Kevin Crowley Ultimate Invitational Tournament, first hosted in Madison in May 1996, run by Kevin's brother, alumni, and future WHHoF inductee Robert "Rhubis" Crowley as well as the Kevin Crowley Spirit award started in 2013. Graduating players nominate a returning player for the Kevin Crowley Spirit award who they believe embodies the best effort, dedication, and attitude just as Kevin Crowley did during his time on the team.

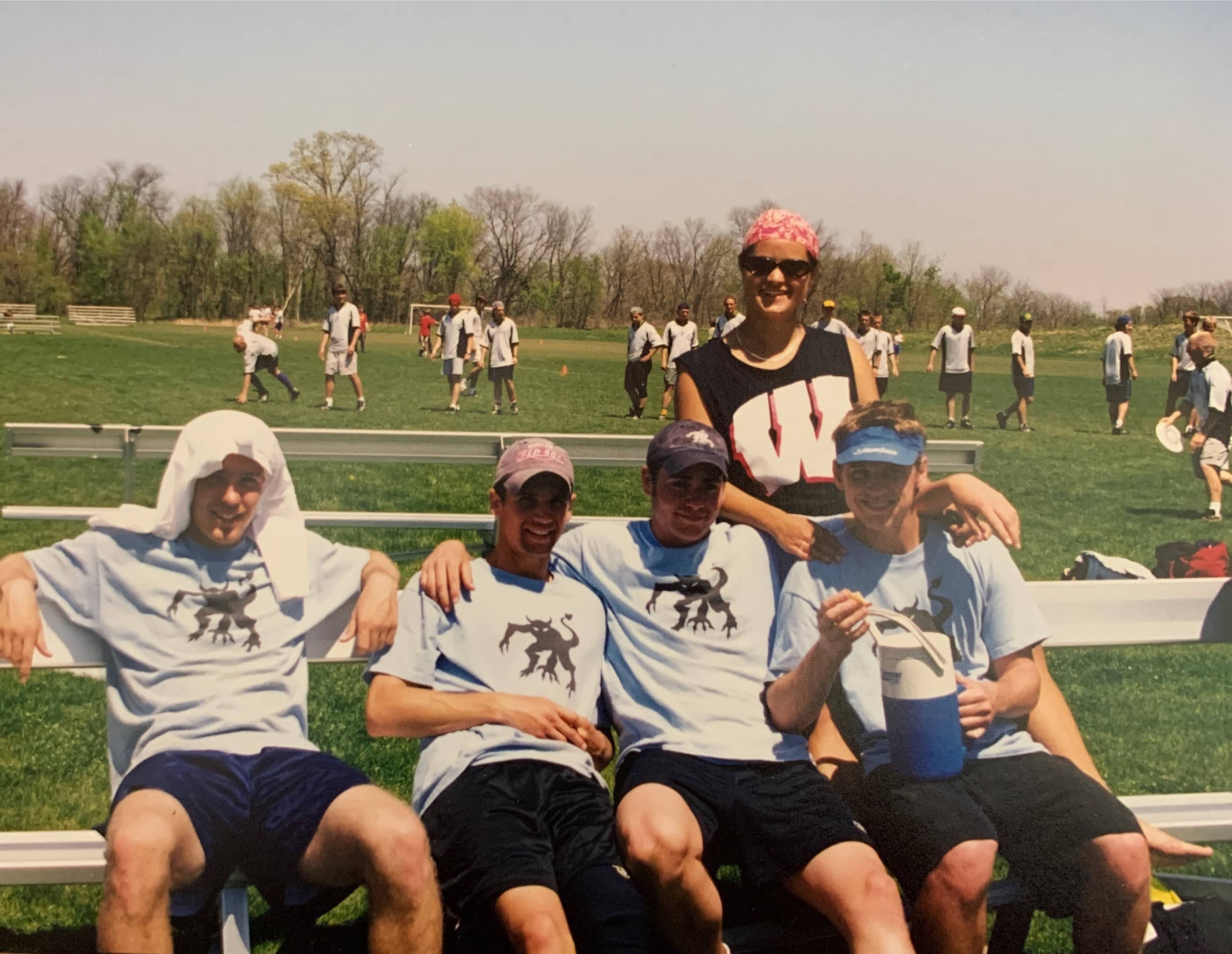
Hodags in the first baby blue jerseys resting at a tournament in 1999. Front row left to right: Dustin Lowery, Matt Bruss, Nate Franz, Eric Moore. Back row: Robin Kutil (UW-Madison Women's Ultimate Team Player)

The team takes on the name the Hodags in 1994 as suggested by captain and future WHHoF inductee Robert "Rhubis" Crowley and Sean Hart. In 1997, Will Henry designs the Hodag logo that is used today. In 1999, baby blue is adopted as the signature color for the Hodags. Hodag alumni Charlie Reznikoff becomes the first coach of the UW-Madison Men's Ultimate B-team in 1999 which becomes an important avenue to grow the population of ultimate athletes at UW-Madison to create a pipeline for the Hodags. At the turn of the century, the Hodags develop an infamous and longstanding regional rivalry with Carleton College's CUT (Carleton Ultimate Team); in 2022, the Grey Duck trophy was created by CUT alumni Tim Schoch to commemorate the historic rivalry and is kept by the winner of the most recent match between the Hodags and CUT.

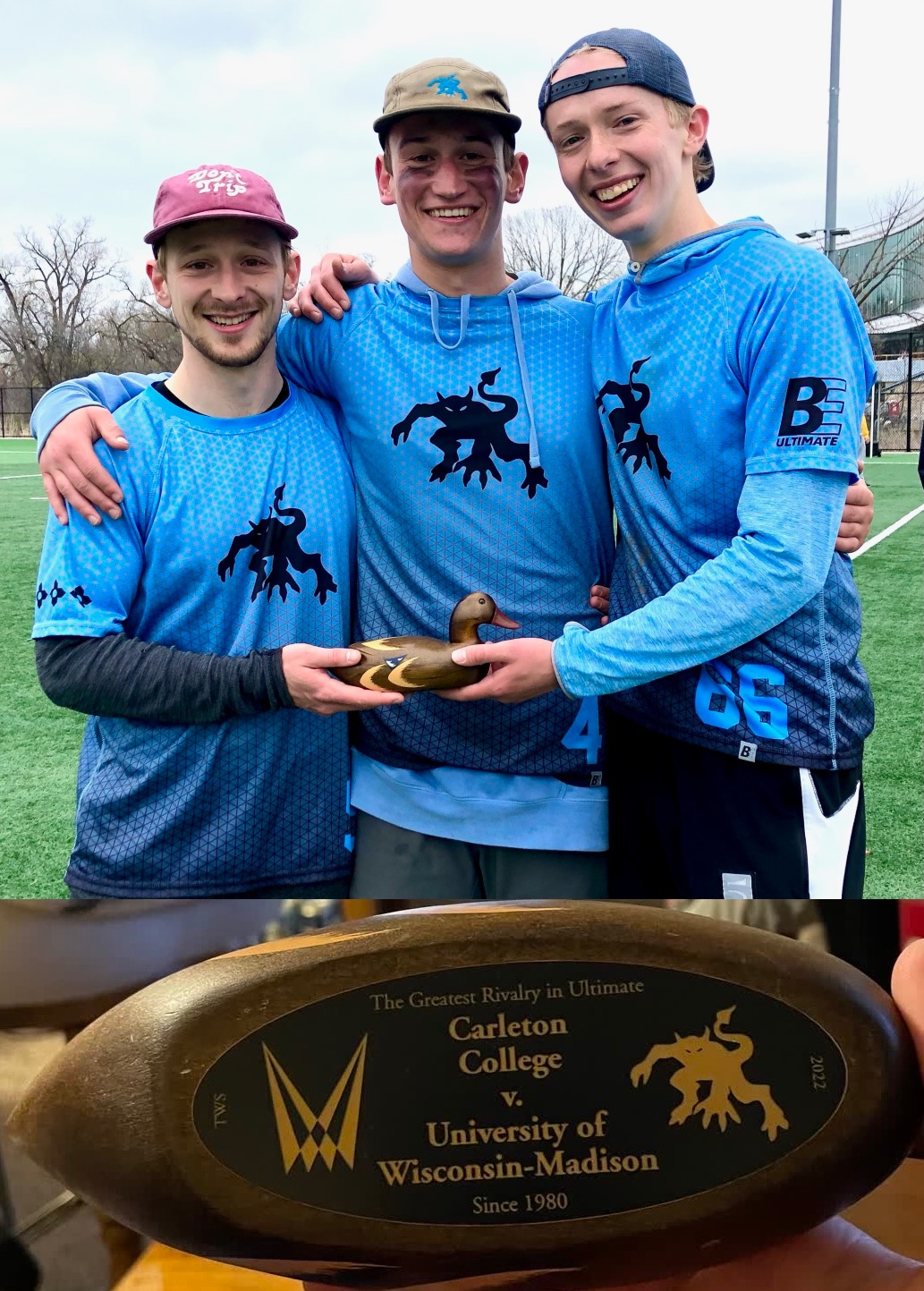
Hodags displaying the Grey Duck rivalry trophy after a win over Carleton CUT at North Central Regionals to qualify for USAU College Nationals in 2022. Left to right: Matt Grinde, Henry Goldenberg, Ted Schewe

In 1991, the UPA College Championship was held in Madison at the University Bay Fields on campus with tournament organizer Brad Wendt which was the first national ultimate tournament held locally (though many UPA club and college Regionals had been hosted prior); this Nationals served as inspiration to the Madison community to grow ultimate frisbee. Brad Wendt tried to host 1992 UPA College Nationals in Madison, but the bid request was denied. Recent Disconsin alumni Jim Stearns, future WHHoF inductee Samson Sackett, and future WHHoF inductee Brad "Zeus" Wendt are part of the group that starts the local disc organization (LDO) MUFA (Madison Ultimate Frisbee Association) which hosts the 1993 WFDF WUCCs (World Ultimate Club Championships) with a Masters Division at the end of July, hosting 83 teams from 17 countries included over 1,500 players and 100 staff with games at 20 full-sized fields for over 500 games at the University Bay Fields and finals at Warner Park with a 2,500-seat stadium in Madison. This was the first Worlds ultimate tournament to be hosted on US soil. The organizers fronted the money to finance the tournament. The organizers were vested in hosting WUCCs because this gave them an auto bid into the tournament and an opportunity to compete at an elite international level for the first time; Madison was represented by Anything Cheesy in the Open Division and Mud in the Women's Division. The tournament was complete with concessions, medical tents, and an "Ultimate Village" (modeled after the Olympic Village) utilizing the Lakeshore Dorms along with a comprehensive recap in the October 1993 UPA Newsletter. This event harkens to Andrew Klein's call in a 1982 UPA Newsletter for an "Ultimate World Cup." MUFA also starts a local ultimate frisbee recreation league in the same year with organization by John Huggett (who also played a role in hosting WUCCs); today, MUFA hosts over 3,500 local ultimate players in multiple divisions across all seasons and has one of the largest ultimate frisbee summer leagues in the world. WUCCs and MUFA league motivate the beginnings of local high school ultimate frisbee teams that act as pipelines to the UW-Madison Ultimate Frisbee programs, particularly Madison West High School with longtime coach John Huggett and Vel Phillips Memorial High School with longtime coach and future USA Ultimate Youth Director Dan Raabe over the next two decades; for example, the first major Junior Division tournament in the Central Division was hosted in 1993 and won by West High School. Samson Sackett was one of the main promoters of high school ultimate in Madison and greater Wisconsin in these early years which helped develop the local pipeline of ultimate players for UW-Madison.

In the rise of the internet and information age in 1994, Gary Lewandowski sets up an FTP site for rec.sport.disc through a UW server (ftp.cs.wisc.edu) to upload and download information about ultimate tournaments, strategy, rules, etc.

In 1999, the Madison men's club team first qualifies for UPA Club Open Nationals held in San Diego, CA; this club team provides an opportunity for UW-Madison players to compete at an elite level in the offseason over the summer in years to come as Madison Club continues to qualify for Club Nationals.

=== 2000–2009 ===
The Hodags attended the USAU D1 Men's College Nationals tournament every year from 2000-2009. The team finished in first place in Nationals three times during this period: in 2003 in Austin, TX with WHHoF inductee Hector "Hh" Valdivia playing, 2007 in Columbus, Ohio, captained by WHHoF inductee Dan Heijmen, and 2008 in Boulder, CO captained by WHHoF inductee Matthew "Reb" Rebholz. They also had runner-up finishes in 2002 and 2006 and quarterfinal finishes in 2001, 2004, 2005, and 2009.

In 2000, the Hodags begin a record-setting 23 consecutive appearances at College Nationals starting under captain and future Wisconsin Hodag Hall of Fame (WHHoF) inductee Jonathan "Opie" O'Connell. In 2001, the Hodags finish 7th in the UPA College Open Rankings and 1st in the Big Ten rankings with a season record of 23-8; the recently formed UW–Madison Men's B Team finishes 87th in the UPA College Open Rankings and 9th in the Big Ten rankings with a season record of 16-9. In 2002, the Hodags lose in the Finals of the UPA College Open Championship, utilizing a variety of defensive schemes including person defense, 3-2-2, and a 4-person cup, and finish the season ranked 3rd in the UPA Open Division College Rankings with a season record of 31-7; the team ranks fourth in team Spirit Score rankings at Nationals with Matt Bruss being nominated as the Spirit Award winner from the team. In 2004, the Hodags finish 2nd in spirit scores at college Nationals with future WHHoF inductee Matt Rebholz as the team's Spirit winner. Dan Heijmen wins the prestigious Callahan award in 2007. The Flying Disc magazine names the Hodags the 4th best college men's ultimate team between 1984 and 2007 behind University of California Santa Barbara Black Tide, Stanford Universy Bloodthirsty, and Carleton College CUT.

Rostered Hodags Kevin Riley, Brandon "Muffin" Malecek, and Andrew Mahowald along with Thomas Shomaker produce the low-budget documentary film of the 2008 Hodag season titled "The Blue Print: Road to Repeat."

Future WHHoF inductee Hector "Hh" Valdivia returns to Madison from Colorado after playing with the USAU club team Denver Johnny Bravo and begins his 12 year tenure as head coach of the Hodags in the 2009 season.

First held in 2009, No Wisconsequences is an October college ultimate tournament at the Milwaukee Polo Grounds established by Hodag Ben Feldman. It was created to provide Midwest college teams with an early-season competition and to raise funds for the Hodags. The tournament currently hosts more than 60 men’s and women’s teams.

In 2009, Hodag alumni Dean Bolton establishes the 501(c)3 Men's Ultimate Frisbee Team Support Endowment Fund, also known as the Hodag Endowment, through the University of Wisconsin Foundation to help offset player cost through donations; since the team is a club sport, players are responsible for covering their own costs for travel, jerseys, tournament fees, etc., as much as $2,000 per player per season, that are not offset by fundraising.

Driven by rostered Hodag Ben Feldman in 2009, the Hodags establish a pro deal sponsorship with Patagonia, Inc. who provides jerseys and apparel to the team; Patagonia first showed interest in marketing to the ultimate frisbee crowd in the early 1990s via the UPA Newsletter.

Hodag alumni Will Henry wins UPA Men's Club Championships with Seattle Sockeye in 2004, 2006, and 2007 with Ron Kubalanza joining the roster in 2007 which all occur at the Sarasota Polo Club in Sarasota, FL; Henry is team captain of Sockeye in 2006 and 2007. In 2008, Hodag alumni Matt Bruss wins a UPA Men's Club Championship with San Francisco JAM at the Sarasota Polo Club in Sarasota, FL.

Hodag alumni and future Wisconsin Hodag Hall of Fame inductee Ron Kubalanza wins the gold medal with Team USA at the 2005 World Games in Duisburg, Germany.

=== 2010-2019 ===
The Hodags continue to be a strong presence, attending Nationals every year in this era, with runner-up finishes at the USAU D1 Men's College Nationals tournament in 2011 and 2012 along with quarterfinal finishes in 2014, 2016, 2017, 2018, and 2019.

In Fall 2011, rostered Hodag Jake Smart establishes the Hodag Alumni Board to support the current team and alumni, such as growing the Hodag Endowment, running alumni weekends, and improving outreach, with Hodag alumni as board members: Dean Bolton, Tom Burkly, Ben Feldman, Jim Foster, Jon Gaynor, Chris Scotto Divetta, and Bert Kang; this first iteration of the Hodag Alumni Board only lasts until 2012. In 2017, rostered Hodag Jeff Maskalunas creates a second iteration of the Hodag Alumni Board with a similar mission to support the current Hodags and alumni through opportunities such as Hodag Endowment and alumni weekends.

Hodag Colin Camp gained notoriety as a dominant offensive cutter on the NexGen Tour in the summers of 2011 and 2012 in addition to winning a gold medal with Team USA Men at the 2013 World Flying Disc Federation (WFDF) World Under-24 (U24) Ultimate Championship in Toronto, Canada alongside Hodag teammates Brian Hart and Kelsen Alexander and coach and alumni Hector "Hh" Valdivia.

In 2013, Hodag alumni Brandon "Muffin" Malecek and Alex Simmons win a Major League Ultimate Championship with the Boston Whitecaps in Philadelphia, PA.

In 2015, Hodag alumni Matthew Scallet assistant coaches University of North Carolina at Chapel Hill's Darkside to the team's first USAU D1 Men's College Championship in Milwaukee, WI.

In 2016, Hodag alumni Ron Kubalanza coaches Team USA for Women's Masters to a World Masters Championship in London, Great Britain.

Hodag alumni Alex Simmons, Tom "Animal" Annen, and future Wisconsin Hodag Hall of Fame inductee Matthew "Reb" Rebholz win the 2016 USAU Men's Club Championship with Boston Ironside in Rockford, IL with Simmons and Annen playing and Rebholz coaching.

Hodag alumni Brandon "Muffin" Malecek wins the 2016 Ultimate Frisbee Association (UFA) Championship with the Dallas Roughnecks at Breese Stevens Field in Madison, WI.

In December 2016, rostered Hodag Avery Johnson worked with Madison Radicals owner and head coach Tim DeByl to organize a showcase game between the Radicals and a group of Wisconsin College All-Stars including players from the UW-Madison Hodags, UW-Whitewater Sub Par, UW-Eau Claire EauZone, and UW-Milwaukee Black Cat at the halftime of an NFL game between the Green Bay Packers and Houston Texans game at Lambeau Field; this event catalyzed a widespread conversation on gender equity and visibility of women's ultimate from UW-Madison Women's ultimate team Bella Donna.

Hodag Ross Barker wins a gold medal with Team USA Men at the 2018 WFDF U24 Ultimate Championship in Perth, Australia.

In 2018, Hodag alumni Andrew Meshnick, Seth Meyer, Avery Johnson, Tom "Animal" Annen, Andrew Brown, Chris Wilen, Sterling Knoche, Dave Wiseman, Colin Camp, and Thomas Coolidge and rostered Hodag Jeff Maskalunas win a UFA Championship with the Madison Radicals with Hodag alumni Jacob Spiro as defensive coach at Breese Stevens Field in Madison, WI.

Hodag alumni Jack Marsh wins a 2018 USAU Men's Club Championship with New York PoNY in San Diego, CA.

Hodag Nick Vogt wins a gold medal with Team USA Men at the 2019 WFDF U24 Ultimate Championship in Heidelberg, Germany; Hodag Tynan Eurwongpravit is rostered for the Team Hong Kong Mixed at this tournament as well.

Hodag alumni James "Jake" Smart head coaches Brown University's Brownian Motion to a 2019 USAU D1 Men's College Championship in Round Rock, TX and receives the honor of Men's D1 College Coach of the Year from Ultiworld.

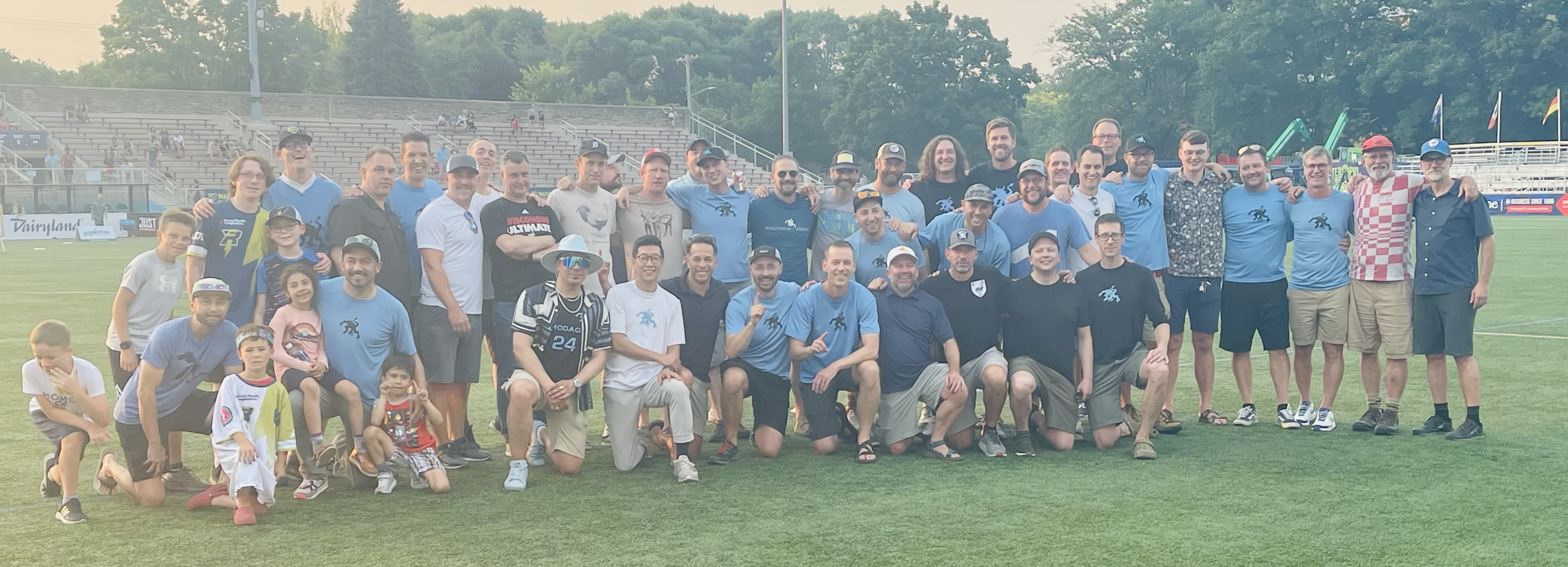
2023 Hodag Alumni Weekend after a Madison Radicals game at Breese Stevens Field

=== 2020-present ===
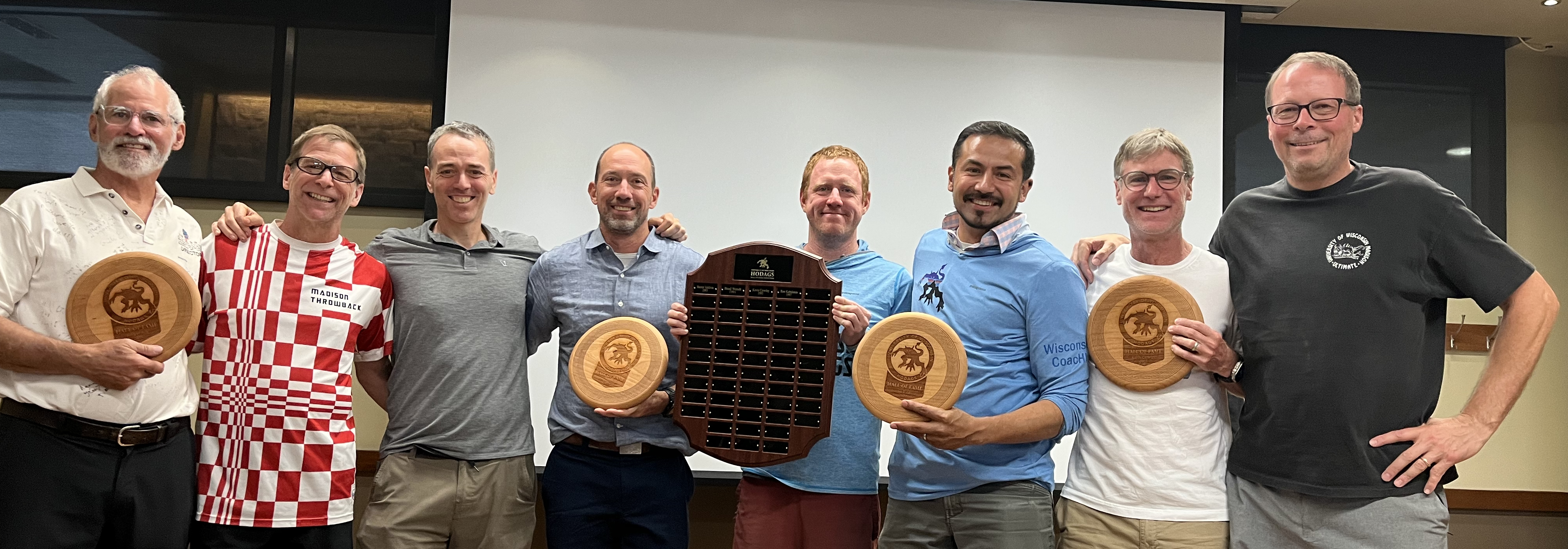
2023 Wisconsin Hodag Hall of Fame Induction Ceremony. Left to Right: Brad "Zeus" Wendt, Samson Sackett, Charlie Reznikoff, Ron Kubalanza, Jonathan "Opie" O'Connell, Hector "Hh" Valdivia, Robert "Rhubis" Crowley, Chuck King

The Hodags qualify for the USAU D1 Men's College Nationals tournament in 2020, 2021, and 2022, but fail to qualify in 2023, ending the record-setting 23 consecutive Nationals appearances in the college Men's division. Through 2022, the Hodags also held the record for the most Nationals qualifications in the USAU College Men's Division with 30 appearances, only missing out on 9 Nationals since the first UPA Men's College Nationals in 1984.

At the end of 2020, the Milwaukee Polo Grounds, where the Fall tournament hosted by the Hodags called No Wisconsequences is held, is bought by the local disc organization Milwaukee Ultimate and prioritized for ultimate frisbee events.

In 2022, the Hodag Alumni Board establishes the Wisconsin Hodag Hall of Fame (WHHoF).

The UW-Madison Dave McClain Athletic Facility indoor turf field and the Camp Randall Sports Center (also known as "the Shell") that had both served as essential training facilities for the Hodags during winter seasons are torn down in 2024.

For his second time, Hodag alumni James "Jake" Smart head coaches Brown University's Brownian Motion to a 2024 USAU D1 Men's College Championship at Breese Stevens Field in Madison, WI and wins Ultiworld's D1 Men's Coach of the Year.

In 2024, Hodag alumni Ben Feldman wins a UFA Championship with the Minnesota Windchill at Zion Bank Stadium in Salt Lake City, UT as Head Coach, General Manager, and Co-Owner of the team.
