= Benjamin Cutter =

American violinist and composer

Benjamin Cutter (Woburn, Massachusetts September 6, 1857 – Boston May 10, 1910) was an American violinist and composer. He studied at the Stuttgart Conservatory in the German Empire, was later a member of the Boston Symphony Orchestra, then taught at the New England Conservatory of Music. His compositional output was mainly chamber music, but he wrote some cantatas and church music as well. He published several pedagogical books on violin playing and music theory.

== Life and career ==
Cutter was the eldest child of Ephraim Cutter, a physician and musical amateur, and his wife Rebecca Smith. Ephraim was an elder brother of William Richard Cutter, the prominent genealogist, who was therefore Benjamin's uncle, despite being just ten years older. After violin study with Julius Eichberg, founder of the Boston Conservatory of Music, Cutter went to Germany, where he studied at the Stuttgart Conservatory under Edmund Singer and Percy Goetschius. He was a member of the Boston Symphony Orchestra from 1881 to 1885, and from 1888 was on the faculty of the New England Conservatory, where he taught violin, viola, harmony, composition, and theory. According to his contemporary Louis Elson, Cutter's work "as a teacher . . . averages very high, and he has graduated hundreds of pupils." Among those students were Florence Price and Oscar Anderson Fuller. Cutter published several practical pedagogical works for violin and in music theory. From 1890 to 1893, Cutter was also on the editorial staff of The Musical Herald.

== Selected compositions ==
=== Chamber music ===
- Eine Liebes-Novelle (A Love Story), 5 Bagatelles for viola and piano, Op. 20 (1894). Score.
- Trio in A minor for violin, cello and piano, Op. 24 (1894)

=== Vocal ===
- What Means That Star?, Christmas Song for mezzo-soprano or contralto and piano (1893), words by James Russell Lowell
- The Douglas Tragedy, a ballad from the traditional Scotch, Op. 19
- Hymn to the North-East Wind for male chorus, Op. 35 (1896), words by Charles Kingsley
- Sir Patrick Spens, ballad for chorus and orchestra, Op. 36 (1896)
- Mass in D for soli, unison chorus and organ (1898)

== Publications ==
- The First Steps in Violin Playing. New England Conservatory Music Store, Boston, 1882.
- How to Study Kreutzer: A Handbook for the Daily Use of Violin Teachers and Violin Students. Boston: Oliver Ditson, 1903.
- Exercises in Harmony ["Supplementary to the Treatise on Harmony by G. W. Chadwick"]. Boston: New England Conservatory of Music, 1899. 11th edition, 1911.
- Harmonic Analysis. Boston: Oliver Ditson, 1902.

=== Harmonic analysis ===
Cutter's concise textbook in harmonic analysis was intended "for those who have studied Harmony and would apply it in their every-day musical life—in other words, in their playing and in their teaching" (v). In particular, he promotes the value of harmonic reduction, as it can make "Playing by Memory and Playing at Sight easier to learn." Since "a piece of figurated music is always built on a plain harmonic structure, [the student will learn] that this harmonic structure is a concrete thing; that it may be taken hold of, as it were; may be played by itself, giving a good idea of the whole." Thus, "in playing from memory there is given to the player a greater assurance, if he knows that at a certain point he is to use such and such a chord, or go to such a key" (80-81). The basic method of harmonic reduction is that "the extreme notes of the florid phrase must be brought into proper vocal compass, after which the inner parts may be added, . . . although occasional breaks in the leading may be unavoidable in the compression of a very florid structure" (8, 83).
