= Cut =

Cut or CUT may refer to:

== Common uses ==
- The act of cutting, the separation of an object into two through acutely directed force
  - A type of wound
  - Cut (archaeology), a hole dug in the past
  - Cut (clothing), the style or shape of a garment
  - Cut (earthworks), an excavation to make way for a transport route
  - Cut (gems)
  - Cut of meat
- Cut (etiquette), a snub or slight such as failure to greet an acquaintance

== Geography ==
=== Romania ===
- Cut, Alba, a commune
- Cut, a village in Dumbrava Roșie

=== United States ===
- Cut, Texas, an unincorporated community
- Cut River (Mackinac County, Michigan)
- Cut River (Roscommon County, Michigan)
- Custer County Airport, South Dakota, US (FAA identifier CUT)

== Computing and mathematics ==
- Cut (logic programming)
- cut (Unix), a command line utility
- Cut, copy, and paste, a set of editing procedures
- Control Unit Terminal, a kind of IBM display terminal for mainframe computers
- Cut (graph theory)

== Books ==
- Cut (manga), a 2008 Japanese manga
- Cut (novel), by Patricia McCormick

== Businesses ==
- Cut (restaurant), a high-end steakhouse chain founded by Wolfgang Puck

== Films and television ==
- Cut (censorship), removal of a scene to meet censors' requirements
- Cut (transition), a transition from one sequence to another
- Cut (2000 film), a horror comedy film
- Cut (2011 film), a Japanese drama film
- Cut (advertisement), a 2009 British advertising campaign on domestic violence

== Games and sport ==
- Cut (cards), a method of mixing a deck of cards
- Cut (golf), a means of reducing the number of competitors in a golf tournament; also, a type of stroke intended to induce a particular ball flight

== Music ==
- Cut (music), an African-American music technique
- Cut drum
- Cut_, a one-off solo/band effort by Ray Wilson, which released Millionairhead in 2000

=== Albums ===
- Cut (C-Tec album), 2000
- Cut (Crack the Sky album), 1998
- Cut (EP), a 2014 EP by Aaron Yan
- Cut (Golden Earring album), 1982
- Cut (Hunters and Collectors album), 1992
- Cut (The Slits album), 1979
- Cut, an album by Flare Acoustic Arts League
- Cut, 1982 album by Adrian Snell

=== Songs ===
- "Cut" (Plumb song), a 2006 song by the singer Plumb
- "Cut", a song by The Cure on the album Wish
- "Cut", a song by iamnot on the album Whoami
- "Cut", a song by No One from No One
- "Cut", a song by Panchiko from D>E>A>T>H>M>E>T>A>L
- "Cut!", a song by Maren Morris and Julia Michaels from Morris's album Dreamsicle

== Acronym ==
=== Schools ===
- Curtin University of Technology, Australia
- Cyprus University of Technology, Cyprus
- Central University of Technology, South Africa
- Chalmers University of Technology, Sweden
- Chinhoyi University of Technology, Zimbabwe

=== Trade unions ===
- Central Única dos Trabalhadores, Brazil
- Central Unitaria de Traballadores Galicia, Spain
- Confederación Unitaria de Traballadores (Central Union of Workers), Colombia
- Central Unitaria de Trabajadores de Chile (Workers' United Center of Chile)
- Confederación Unitaria de Trabajadores (Costa Rica)
- Confederación Unitaria de Trabajadores del Perú

=== Other ===
- Campaign for Unmetered Telecommunications, a UK political pressure group
- Candidatura Unitaria de Trabajadores (Unitarian Candidacy of Workers)
- Carleton Ultimate Team
- Church Universal and Triumphant, a religious movement
- Cincinnati Union Terminal
- Cleveland Union Terminal
- Compact Utility Tractor
- Coordinated Universal Time, a time standard; the official abbreviation is "UTC".
- Cryptic unstable transcript, a type of RNA molecule

== Codes ==
- CUT, IATA code for Cutral Có Airport, Argentina
- CUT, English MTR station code for Chung Uk Tsuen stop, Hong Kong

== See also ==
- Cuts (disambiguation)
- Cutting (disambiguation)
- The Cut (disambiguation)
