= Campaign for Unmetered Telecommunications =

The Campaign for Unmetered Telecommunications (CUT) was a United Kingdom political pressure group that operated between 1998 and 2001. CUT campaigned for a fairer choice of telecommunications tariffs for consumers—in particular, unmetered local telephone calls that the organisation said would allow the "full potential" of the Internet to be realised. CUT pressured telecommunications operators, regulatory bodies and Government. The campaign was cited as "a major driving force" behind the introduction of unmetered Internet access in the United Kingdom.

== Background ==
Before the introduction of broadband Internet to the telecommunications market, access to the Internet was most commonly achieved through a dial-up connection that limited speeds to a bitrate of less than 56 kilobits per second. In the 1990s, telecommunications companies in Europe and the United States offered "local call" telephone numbers for this purpose. In Europe, these calls were usually billed based on the length of time a user was connected, whereas US companies offered free local calls for a flat rate fee. As a result, Internet use in the UK was at a much lower rate than in the US; the differing billing strategies meant that US consumers could afford to stay connected for longer periods than their UK counterparts, who had to ration their use of the Internet to avoid large phone bills. This in turn held back the growth of e-commerce and Internet gaming in the UK. In January 1998, the European Union had opened to telecommunications competition, but by the end of the year costs still remained high, and little movement had been made on the provision of unmetered Internet access. In Spain, former state operator Telefónica de España was forced to reduce costs after protests from users, and Germany's former state operator, Deutsche Telekom, was reported to the European Commission by AOL for perceived anti-competitive pricing. Marketing analysts supported the view that metered access stifled economic growth; Jupiter Communications reported that European e-commerce generated only 3% of the revenue of that generated in the US in 1998. The International Data Corporation reported that approximately 10% of the population of Europe was active on the web in 1998–1999, and that approximately 11% of these bought products or services via the web in the last three months of 1998. AOL was one of the few companies that supported a similar business model in Europe as it did in the US, whereas companies such as British Telecom (BT) claimed that offering unmetered local calls was not cost-effective.

== Aims ==
"We campaign for the availability of unmetered narrowband and broadband telecommunications at reasonable cost to everyone in the United Kingdom."

— Opening sentence of CUT mission statement

Founded in April 1998, the not-for-profit Campaign for Unmetered Telecommunications was set up with the primary aim of seeing the introduction of unmetered Internet access in the UK. In its mission statement, CUT argued the case for unmetered telecommunications: (Note: CUT did not use the term "free" because it felt the term was used by the media and telecommunications companies, and that "unmetered" provided a more precise representation of the organisation's aims. CUT said, "'Free' is not free. Although there may be no subscription fee you pay indirectly for such access, usually by telephone calls charged by the minute." It also argued that using the term "encourages trivial responses such as 'you can't get something for nothing' or 'there's no such thing as a free lunch'. Using 'unmetered' emphasises that you pay a single subscription fee for access, say every month, and there is no per-minute call cost." Finally, CUT said that "free" was an abused term, and gave Freeserve as an example: "Freeserve has nothing to do with 'free': although it levies no subscription fee, you're still paying by the minute to access its services." Using the term "unmetered" instead, CUT said, "implies you pay a single subscription fee for the service and that's all you pay. There's no question of 'something for nothing': we demand fair, not free, charges.")

"Why:

- The full potential of the Internet can only be realised through it
- It will enrich local community life
- Traditional and electronic commerce will be enhanced by its availability
- It is done elsewhere, profitably
- The majority of costs of telecommunications provision are fixed

How:

- Educating ourselves
- Putting pressure on telecommunications operators, regulatory bodies and Government
- Countering misinformation
- Encouraging others"

CUT said that people on lower-incomes especially would benefit from unmetered access, as they were unable to exploit the Internet's potential—its social, educational, and commercial benefits—when faced with the high call charges of the existing system. CUT was financed through paid yearly membership; by April 2000 it claimed to have over three hundred members, several thousand "pledge signers", and "over one hundred and eighty explicit corporate supporters" that included AOL UK, Intel, and Legal & General. CUT claimed to have other corporate supporters that requested not to be named.

== European web boycott ==
CUT organised the United Kingdom's involvement in a pan-European boycott of the World Wide Web that took place on 6 June 1999. Users in 14 countries participated in the 24-hour boycott. The united European campaign aimed for:

- "Costs of all telephone calls to more closely mirror the independently audited cost to telecommunications operators of providing these calls, as already mandated by EU law."
- "Introduction of flat-rate charges for—in the first instance—local calls, so that anyone can talk to friends and relatives, and Internet users can dial up to Internet Service Providers using a telephone modem, without worrying about the clock ticking and charges ratcheting up."
- "For any remaining metered calls, abolition of the minimum call charge so that calls are paid for solely by the time spent connected."
- "For Internet users, quicker introduction of modern access methods such as xDSL, cable modems and satellite access, which do not use the telephone modem and are a great improvement on it for users."

The boycott was supported by AOL. In the days leading up to the boycott, AOL UK contacted its subscribers and gave them background information about CUT's campaign, including an open letter that was written jointly by CUT and AOL UK's then-president and managing director, David Wendell Phillips. AOL UK users were given details on how to contact their Member of Parliament and Member of the European Parliament, and were asked to write to them about Internet costs in the UK. AOL UK also surveyed its users on the issue of unmetered Internet access. Almost all of the respondents said local call costs were the largest barrier to Internet use. AOL Europe had previously backed calls for unmetered access; in early 1999, the company asked the European Commission to end perceived anti-competitive pricing by Germany's former state telecommunications operator, Deutsche Telekom. AOL Europe's then-president and chief executive officer, Andreas Schmidt, said that unmetered access would "fuel job creation and provide consumers and businesses with an unprecedented array of new choices". The German Institute for Economic Research backed the view that Internet use in Germany was too costly, and that this was mainly due to the high price of local calls.

On 5 June 1999—one day before the boycott—BT began to provide unmetered Internet access at weekends to users of its "Plan Unlimited" tariff. BT—at the time not known for being receptive to new technologies or changes in its business model—had previously dismissed the idea, and its change in policy represented a significant progression for the company and the telecommunications industry as a whole. The timing of the announcement also ensured that BT's customers would be more likely to take advantage of the unmetered access instead of participating in the boycott.

== Impact and dissolution ==
In November 1998, Tim Berners-Lee endorsed the campaign in a piece written for CUT; the piece was quoted by the Member of Parliament for Northavon, Steve Webb, in a House of Commons debate in June 1999. Webb backed the view that the UK's telecommunications companies were stifling the Internet as a tool for "business, education and leisure" through metered Internet access. He said CUT had been "energetic and effective in publicising the issue" and praised CUT's website for its promotion of unmetered telecommunications. In March 1999, the Parliamentary Select Committee on Trade and Industry invited CUT to participate in the Committee's "Inquiry into Electronic Commerce"; the invitation was to respond to the then-telecommunications regulator Oftel's submission to the committee, in which Oftel argued against unmetered local calls. CUT's submission was quoted at length in the Committee's report, which CUT said endorsed the eventual adoption of unmetered telecommunications. In October 1999, a delegation from CUT met with then-Department of Trade and Industry Minister of State for Small Business and e-Commerce, Patricia Hewitt, and in November 1999, CUT was the only body from outside the telecommunications and Internet service provision industry to be invited to membership of Oftel's "Third Internet Forum on Internet tariffs".

In December 1999, BT presented five tariffs—subsequently reduced to three—for approval by Oftel. These packages offered unmetered Internet access to consumers. In February 2000, cable operator Telewest did likewise for a maximum fee of £20 per month, and by the end of March, the operator had offered a broadband service for £50 per month. In April 2000, NTL offered free Internet access to its cable television subscribers and unmetered access at £10 per month to non-subscribers. The cable operators' business model was subsequently emulated by many other ISPs, including BT Internet, LineOne, Freeserve, Tiny Online, virgin.net and ic24. In April 2000, MCI Worldcom announced its own wholesale product after its complaint against BT for anti-competitive practises was upheld. Though BT offered an unmetered product, it wasn't until 2001 that BT had written FRIACO (Flat Rate Internet Access Call Origination) into its licence.

On 10 June 2001, at CUT's third annual general meeting, the committee members voted to dissolve the group, as they believed that CUT's objective—"unmetered telecommunications at reasonable cost in the United Kingdom"—had been met. The Register cited CUT as "a major driving force behind the adoption of unmetered access in Britain", though it had said that CUT "would end up being a casualty of its own success" after helping to "turn [the telecommunications industry] on its head". Oftel staff also claimed that CUT's operations influenced policy-making at the body. Tim Richardson of The Register said, "Every single person who uses unmetered Net access in the UK is indebted to CUT. Make no mistake, CUT took on BT and won."

== See also ==
- Network neutrality
