= The Storyteller (Star Trek: Deep Space Nine) =

- Star Trek: Deep Space Nine episode
- Episode no.: Season 1 Episode 14
- Directed by: David Livingston
- Story by: Kurt Michael Bensmiller
- Teleplay by: Kurt Michael Bensmiller; Ira Steven Behr
- Cinematography by: Marvin Rush
- Production code: 414
- Original air date: May 3, 1993

Guest appearances
- Aron Eisenberg as Nog; Kay E. Kuter as Sirah; Lawrence Monoson as Hovath; Gina Philips as Varis Sul; Jim Jansen as Faren; Jordan Lund as Woban

Episode chronology
| ← Previous "Battle Lines" | Next → "Progress" |
- Star Trek: Deep Space Nine season 1

"The Storyteller" is the 14th episode of the first season of the American syndicated science fiction television series Star Trek: Deep Space Nine.

Set in the 24th century, the series follows the adventures on Deep Space Nine, a space station located near the planet Bajor. In this episode, two simultaneous plotlines unfold. Chief of Operations Miles O'Brien is recruited to save a Bajoran village from destruction. Back on the station, Commander Sisko arbitrates a land dispute between two factions of Bajorans, the Paqu and the Navot, while the adolescent leader of the Paqu (for whom Sisko's son's friend Nog develops a crush) learns the art of compromise.

This episode aired in broadcast syndication the week of May 3, 1993.

== Plot ==
O'Brien and Chief Medical Officer Dr. Bashir are sent on a relief mission to Bajor in response to a medical emergency. Meanwhile, on the station, Sisko plays mediator in a conflict between two rival Bajoran factions negotiating a border dispute. The leader of one of the factions, Tetrarch Varis Sul, is a fifteen-year-old girl. She proves unwilling to negotiate, and Sisko is frustrated with her intransigence.

Nog is captivated by the girl. He and Sisko's son, Jake, introduce themselves to her, and she agrees to spend time with them. She is stressed by the negotiations, but Nog suggests that problems can become opportunities. To cheer her up, the three embark on a prank to steal the bucket in which Security Chief Odo, a shapeshifter, regenerated in a liquid state. Nog fills the bucket with oatmeal and pretends to trip, covering Jake with the contents. Varis apologises to Sisko for her involvement in the escapade. They discuss the challenges of leadership, and she eventually agrees to propose a compromise resolution to the border dispute.

Responding to the distress call, Bashir and O'Brien find that a man called the Sirah is dying, and the village leader, Faren, claims that a force called the "Dal'Rok" will destroy the village if the Sirah is not able to fend it off. That night, the Sirah speaks to the entire village as a threatening cloudlike apparition appears in the sky. The Sirah tells a narrative about the village defeating the Dal'Rok. He collapses during his speech, but he whispers the rest of the story to O'Brien, who repeats it; and as the villagers cheer, a beam of light seems to make the apparition disappear. By the time the Dal'Rok is gone the Sirah has died, and Faren declares O'Brien to be his successor.

The next day, the villagers treat O'Brien like a king. The old Sirah's apprentice, Hovath, attempts to kill O'Brien, declaring himself to be the true Sirah. He reveals that the Dal'Rok was created by the first Sirah, using a fragment of a mystical Orb of the Prophets, to solve the internal strife tearing apart the village. When the villagers unite in their thoughts to stop it, the Sirah secretly uses the fragment to channel their thoughts. Hovath had had his chance to lead the village against the Dal'Rok earlier that week, and failed.

That night, O'Brien stands before the village and attempts to tell the story, but the villagers are unmoved by his clumsy narrative, and the Dal'Rok returns in full force. Hovath takes the stage and eloquently tells of a new voice challenging the Dal'Rok, realizing the Sirah deliberately created this opportunity for him to redeem his failure. The villagers follow Hovath's lead and defeat the Dal'Rok, embracing him as their new Sirah and relieving O'Brien of the post.

== Production ==
The story idea came from Kurt Michael Bensmiller who first pitched it as an episode for season one of Star Trek: The Next Generation. They did not go ahead with the script but asked him to pitch other ideas which eventually led to the episode "Time Squared". The script for "The Storyteller" came to the attention of Michael Piller who liked it and, years later, asked Bensmiller to rewrite it for Deep Space Nine.

Guest star Kay E. Kuter previously appeared in Star Trek: The Next Generation episode "The Nth Degree".

The matte painting of the Bajoran village is the same matte painting from the Star Trek: The Next Generation "Birthright" episodes (Season 6, Episode 16 and 17) in which it depicted the colony of Romulan and Klingon survivors from the Khitomer massacre.

== Reception ==
Keith DeCandido of Tor.com rated it three out of ten and wrote: "two good pairings do not a watchable story make, and the episode is ultimately completely forgettable."

In 2019, Screen Rant reported that IMDb users had rated this episode as one of the ten worst episodes of Star Trek: Deep Space Nine.

== Home media releases ==
"The Storyteller" was released on LaserDisc on March 18, 1997. Published by Paramount Home Video and made by Pioneer USA, the double sided disc had runtime of 92 minutes and also included the previous episode "Battle Lines".

== See also ==
- Egregor – Occult concept, illustrated through this episode's story.
