= Vortex (Star Trek: Deep Space Nine) =

- Star Trek: Deep Space Nine episode
- Episode no.: Season 1 Episode 12
- Directed by: Winrich Kolbe
- Written by: Sam Rolfe
- Production code: 412
- Original air date: April 19, 1993

Guest appearances
- Max Grodénchik as Rom; Cliff DeYoung as Croden; Randy Oglesby as Ah-Kel / Ro-Kel; Gordon Clapp as Hadran; Kathleen Garrett as Vulcan Captain; Leslie Engelberg as Yareth

Episode chronology
← Previous "The Nagus"	Next → "Battle Lines"
- Star Trek: Deep Space Nine season 1

"Vortex" is the 12th episode of the first season of the American science fiction television series Star Trek: Deep Space Nine.

Set in the 24th century, the series follows the adventures on Deep Space Nine, a space station located near a stable wormhole between the Alpha and Gamma quadrants of the galaxy. This episode focuses on Deep Space Nine's security chief Odo, a shapeshifter of unknown origin. In this episode, a criminal from the Gamma Quadrant claims he has encountered other "Changelings" like Odo.

The episode aired on television in syndication the week of April 19, 1993.

== Plot ==
During a business transaction between unscrupulous bar operator Quark and a pair of Miradorn twins, a visitor from the Gamma Quadrant, Croden, attempts to steal a valuable item. Odo intercedes, but not before one of the twins is killed. Odo takes Croden into custody, while the remaining twin, Ah-kel, vows vengeance.

Croden makes several comments to Odo regarding "Changelings". This piques Odo's interest, as he has never encountered another shapeshifter. Croden claims there were once shapeshifters on his homeworld, who were persecuted and driven off the planet. Croden claims to know of a place where they still exist, and tries to tempt Odo by offering to bring him to this colony. Odo is dubious of Croden's stories until Croden shows him a necklace containing a stone that changes shape. Dr. Bashir examines it and tells Odo that, given its composition, it could be distantly related to Odo.

Croden's homeworld demands his return, and Commander Sisko sends Odo to return him. Ah-Kel intimidates Quark into revealing that Odo has taken Croden to the Gamma Quadrant, and he pursues them to exact vengeance on Croden.

In the runabout vessel, Croden tells Odo that he was a political prisoner on his home planet, and most of his family was killed by the government. When Ah-Kel appears in pursuit, Odo is forced to release Croden to assist in evading Ah-Kel's ship. Croden navigates the Chamra Vortex, an asteroid field filled with unstable pockets called toh-maire, and lands on an asteroid he claims contains the Changeling colony. On the surface, Croden's eagerness reignites Odo's doubt. Odo demands the truth of Croden's stories. Croden reveals that he has never actually met a Changeling; the shapeshifting stone he showed Odo was bought at a marketplace. Croden uses the stone to open a chamber he had left on the asteroid's surface, containing his daughter, whom he had put into stasis.

Ah-Kel fires on the asteroid, prompting the three to return to their runabout. A falling rock incapacitates Odo and Croden carries him back to the runabout. In the Vortex, Odo tricks Ah-Kel into firing on a pocket of toh-maire, destroying the pursuing ship.

Ultimately, Croden decides to answer for his crime on his homeworld and asks Odo to care for his daughter; but Odo, indebted to Croden, finds a Vulcan ship that agrees to take Croden and his daughter back to Vulcan. Croden gives Odo his necklace containing the Changeling stone as a sign of thanks.

== Production ==
The Miradorn spacecraft in this episode was designed by Richard Delgado. The model was used to film visual effects shots and was sold at auction in 2006 for about $4500.

Rene Auberjonois worked to smile in this episode through his rubber mask costume.

== Reception ==
In 2015, Geek.com recommended this episode as "essential watching" for their abbreviated Star Trek: Deep Space Nine binge-watching guide.

Zach Handlen of The A.V. Club called the episode "mediocre" but with some "good moments that elevate it". One point of interest is that the episode "hints" at deeper backstory for the character Odo.
