= Cutting (disambiguation) =

Cutting is the division or separation of a physical object with an edged instrument.

Cutting or cuttings may also refer to:

== Entertainment ==
- Film editing
- Cut (music), a musical and deejaying technique
- The act of competing in or winning a cutting contest, a type of musical battle

== Human behaviour ==
- Cutting in line, the act of entering a queue at any position other than the end
- A form of suicide and self-harm

== Sport and leisure ==
- Cutting (sport), an equestrian event
- Cutting (cards), a common practice in card games to prevent cheating
- Weight cutting, the practice of rapid weight loss prior to a sporting competition
- Cutting in, the act of taking a dance partner from another
- A bodybuilding strategy

== Transport ==
- Cutting (automobile)
- Cutting (transportation), an excavation to make way for a transport route
- A form of naval boarding, popular during the age of sail

== Other uses ==
- Cutting (surname), a surname
- Cutting, Moselle, France
- Cutting (plant), a technique for plant propagation
- Cutting horse, horse trained to cut cattle
- The act of using a cutting agent to dilute drugs

== See also ==
- Cut (disambiguation)
- Cutter (disambiguation)
- Tribology
