= Cuts =

Cuts or CUTS may refer to

- The plural of any cut, see Cut (disambiguation)
- Cuts, Oise, a commune in France
- Cuts (TV series), a 2005 TV series
- Cuts (album), an album by Merzbow, Balázs Pándi and Mats Gustafsson
- Cuts (EP), a 1992 EP by L.A. Guns
- Central University for Tibetan Studies, in Sarnath, Varanasi, Uttar Pradesh, India
- Compact utility tractors, tractors designed primarily for landscaping and estate management tasks
- Computer Users' Tape Standard, a standard for storage of digital microcomputer data on consumer quality cassettes

== See also ==
- Cut (disambiguation)
