= The Cut =

The Cut may refer to:

== Media ==
- The Cut, a 2011 novel by American author George Pelecanos
- The Cut (publication), a website by New York magazine
- The Cut (magazine), a bi-monthly New Zealand golf magazine
- The Cut (play), a 2006 theatre play by Mark Ravenhill

=== Television ===
- The Cut (1998 TV series), a 1998 MTV talent series hosted by TLC member Lisa "Left Eye" Lopes
- The Cut (2005 TV series), a television reality show for world class fashion designers
- The Cut (Australian TV series), an Australian drama television series
- The Cut (British TV series), a BBC television teen drama

=== Film ===
- The Cut (2007 film), a South Korean horror film
- The Cut (2014 drama film), an internationally co-produced drama film directed by Fatih Akın
- The Cut (2014 short film), a short film
- The Cut (2017 film), a Kenyan film directed by Peter Wangugi Gitau
- The Cut (2024 film), a British film directed by Sean Ellis

=== Other ===
- The Cut, a professional wrestling stable

== Places ==
- The Cut (Michigan), a river in Roscommon County, Michigan
- The Cut, Berkshire, a river in England that rises in North Ascot, Berkshire
- The Cut, London, a street in London which runs between Waterloo Road in Lambeth and Blackfriars Road in Southwark
- The Cut (theatre), a theatre in the Suffolk town of Halesworth
- The Cut, an 1834 bridge built in the Northern Irish town of Banbridge
- Maryland House of Correction (also "The Cut"), a Maryland Department of Corrections state maximum security prison
- Montlake Cut (also "The Cut"), the easternmost section of the Lake Washington Ship Canal

== See also ==
- Cut (disambiguation)
