= Cutter =

Cutter may refer to:

== Tools ==
- Bolt cutter
- Box cutter
- Cigar cutter
- Cookie cutter
- Cutter (hydraulic rescue tool)
- Glass cutter
- Meat cutter
- Milling cutter
- Paper cutter
- Pizza cutter
- Side cutter

== People ==
- Cutter (surname)
- Cutter Boley (born 2005), American football player
- Cutter Gauthier (born 2004), American hockey player
- A high-grade tailor, who cuts pattens

=== Fictional characters ===
- Cutter, a character from the 1998 animated film Antz
- Cutter, a character from the comic book property Elfquest
- Cutter (G.I. Joe), a character from the G.I. Joe toyline, comic books, and animated series
- Cutter John, a character from the comic strip Bloom County
- Cutter Wentworth, a character from the television soap opera One Life to Live
- John Cutter, a character from the 1992 film Passenger 57
- Nick Cutter, a character from the television series Primeval
- Sol Cutter, a character from the video game Burn Cycle
- Captain Spaulding (Rob Zombie character) (nicknamed "Cutter"), a character appearing in films by Rob Zombie

== Companies ==
- Cutter Consortium, an information technology research firm
- Cutter Laboratories, a pharmaceutical company

== Entertainment ==
- The Cutter (film), a 2005 American action film directed by William Tannen
- Cutters (TV series), an American television series
- Cutter (professional wrestling), a move in professional wrestling involving a facelock and a bulldog, also known as an RKO
- The Cutter (album), a compilation album of Echo & the Bunnymen
- "The Cutter" (song), a 1983 single by Echo & the Bunnymen

== Sport and games ==
- Cutter or cut fastball, a type of pitch in baseball
- Cutter (card player), the player who cuts the pack in a card game
- Cutter, a participant in the equestrian sport of cutting, where the horse and rider demonstrate their ability to handle cattle
- Cutters, a Little 500 cycling team

== Transportation ==
- Cutter (boat), a term applied to several different sorts of watercraft
- Cutter, a type of small horse-drawn sleigh

== Other uses ==
- Coors Cutter, a beverage
- Cutter Expansive Classification, a library classification system
- Someone who engages in self-harm

== See also ==
- Cut (disambiguation)
- Cutting (disambiguation)
- Qatar
- Kutter (disambiguation)
