= Kutter =

Kutter may refer to:

== People ==
Notable people with this surname include:

- Anton Kutter (1903–1985), German film director and inventor
- Édouard Kutter Jr. (born 1934), photographer from Luxembourg
- Édouard Kutter Sr. (1887–1978), photographer from Luxembourg
- Eneli Kutter (born 1991), Estonian footballer
- Friedrich Kutter (1834–1891), German physician and ornithologist
- Hermann Kutter (1863–1931), Swiss Lutheran theologian
- Joseph Kutter (1894–1941), painter from Luxembourg
- Paul Kutter (1863–1937), Swiss-Luxembourgish photographer

Notable people with this given name include:

- Kutter Crawford (born 1996), American baseball player

== Other uses ==
- Keen Kutter, a trade name first used by Simmons Hardware Company of St. Louis, Missouri in 1866
  - Keen Kutter Building, in Wichita, Kansas
- Krud Kutter, a trade name now owned by Rust-Oleum

== See also ==
- Cutter (disambiguation)
- Kotter (disambiguation)
- Kuter
