= Sarasota Polo Club =

- Interactive map of Sarasota Polo Club
- Address: 8201 Polo Trail
- Location: Sarasota, Florida
- Coordinates: 27°22′51″N 82°23′48″W
- Type: Polo club
- Event: Sporting events
- Acreage: 130

Construction
- Opened: 1991

Website
- sarasotapolo.com

Sarasota Polo Club is a polo club located in Sarasota, Florida in Sarasota County. The club was founded in 1991 by Robert Uihlein Jr. of Schroeder-Manatee Ranch (SMR). The property is described as the first development within the master planned community of Lakewood Ranch.

== Features ==
The property contains nine world-class polo fields, thirty-five private ranches, 1/2 mile (0.80 km) track, boarding facilities for 72 horses, and a clubhouse.
