= James Cutting =

James Cutting may refer to:

- James Ambrose Cutting (1814–1867), American photographer and inventor
- James E. Cutting, American cognitive scientist, researcher, and professor
