= FRIACO =

FRIACO stands for Flat Rate Internet Access Call Origination. It refers to the unmetered access to dial-up Internet services. Telephone numbers used for such dial-up services are free-phone (or toll-free) numbers, so that the user of the service is not paying for the duration of the call in a metered way. Instead, an ISP (Internet service provider) would make other arrangements to cover costs through fixed subscriptions and/or advertising. The UK Government's regulatory body for communications, Ofcom, dealt with the introduction of FRIACO in the UK.
