= Irving Samuel Cutter =

- Born: December 5, 1875; New Hampshire, U.S.
- Died: February 5, 1945 (aged 69)
- Education: University of Nebraska
- Medical career
- Profession: Doctor
- Institutions: Northwestern University

Irving Samuel Cutter (December 5, 1875 – February 2, 1945) was a medical doctor, teacher of medicine, and a medical journalist from Keene, New Hampshire.

== Career ==
He was born in New Hampshire, and educated in the Midwest, graduating from the University of Nebraska in 1898. He received his medical degree from the same institution in 1910 and his D.Sc degree in 1925. Cutter became a high school instructor in Humboldt, Nebraska in 1896 and was the principal of Beatrice High School 1898–1900. He instructed physiological chemistry at the University of Nebraska 1910–1913 and went on to teach biochemistry, 1913–1915 working as Professor of Biochemistry and director of laboratories. From 1915–1925, he served as Dean of the College of Medicine at the University of Nebraska and was editor of the Nebraska State Medical journal. In the same period he was a member of the editorial board of Annals of Medical History.

After a decade in Nebraska, Cutter was appointed the dean of Northwestern University’s medical school in 1925 and in 1941 was named dean emeritus. During his time in Evanston, Cutter contributed to several Chicago newspapers. In 1934, he was named the health editor of the Chicago Tribune, and he wrote the column “How to Keep Well.” As well as being a published author, he was also an ardent collector of very rare books such as Harvey's De generatione published in Amsterdam in 1645.

== Published works ==
- A Laboratory Manual of High School Botany
- Historical sketch of the development of midwifery and gynaecology
- Principles and practice of physical therapy
- A short history of midwifery
- Landmarks in surgical progress
- Surgery of the Century 1830 - 1930
