= Robert Cutting =

Robert Cutting may refer to:

- Robert L. Cutting Jr. (1836–1894), American banker and clubman
- Robert L. Cutting (1812–1887), American businessman
- Robert Fulton Cutting (1852–1934), American financier and philanthropist
- Robert Bayard Cutting (1875–1918), American soldier
