= Kay E. Kuter =

American actor (1925–2003)

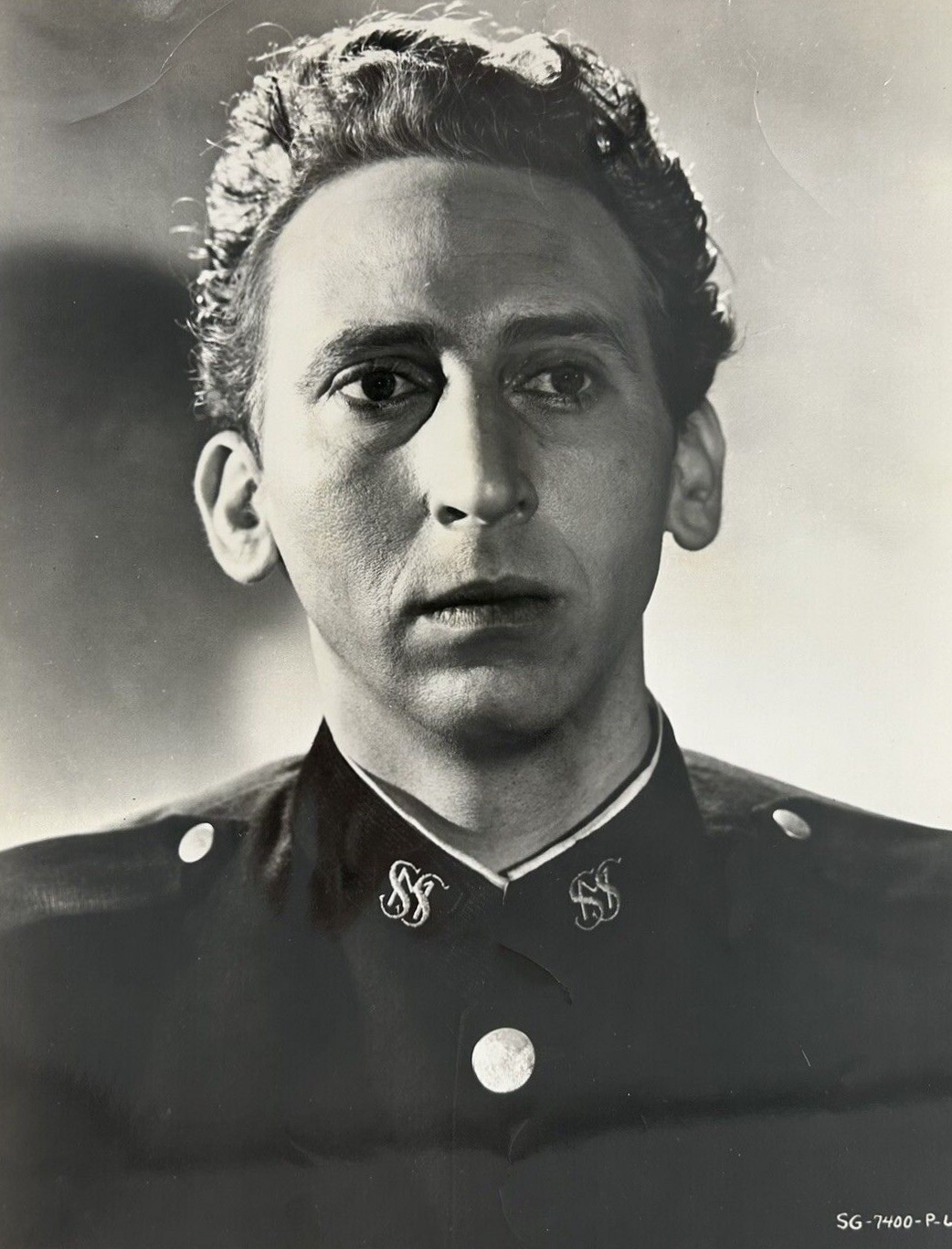
- Kuter in Guys and Dolls, 1955
- Born: Kay Edwin Emmert Kuter; April 25, 1925; Los Angeles, California, U.S.
- Died: November 12, 2003 (aged 78); Burbank, California, U.S.
- Resting place: Forest Lawn Memorial Park, Hollywood Hills
- Occupation: Actor
- Years active: 1954–2003

Kay Edwin Emmert Kuter (April 25, 1925 – November 12, 2003) was an American actor who appeared on television and in films. He is mostly recognized for his role as farmer Newt Kiley on the CBS sitcoms Green Acres and Petticoat Junction, which shared several characters.

The son of art director Leo K. Kuter and silent screen actress Evelyn Edler, Kuter was born in Los Angeles, California. He performed mostly as a serious actor or "heavy" in many 1960s series, often in a beard, before taking the recurring role on the two comedy series.

He appeared in many films, including The Last Starfighter as Enduran, Warlock and Gross Anatomy. His last film role was in the 2004 film Forbidden Warrior. He also provided voice work for animated films, including providing the voice of Santa Claus in Annabelle's Wish and the voice of Grimsby in The Little Mermaid II: Return to the Sea, replacing Ben Wright, who died in 1989. In his later years, he did extensive voice acting in video games, including playing the bartender Griswold Goodsoup in The Curse of Monkey Island and Dockmaster Velasco / the casino croupier in Grim Fandango, both well-known LucasArts Adventure games of the 1990s. He was probably best known to video game fans as Werner Huber in The Beast Within: A Gabriel Knight Mystery. He was the voice of "Hershey's Kisses" commercials for 14 years.

He made guest appearances on many television series, including The Rifleman, Bonanza, Perry Mason, Gunsmoke, Beyond Belief: Fact or Fiction as Anatole Guttenoff in the twelfth episode of the third season, Star Trek: The Next Generation as a Cytherian in the season four episode "The Nth Degree", and in Star Trek: Deep Space Nine as the Bajoran Sirah in the first-season episode "The Storyteller". He also appeared on ER, the Charmed episode "Happily Ever After", the Outer Limits episode "The Premonition" as a "Limbo Being" caught in time, Seinfeld as a Latvian Orthodox priest, The X-Files episode "The Calusari" as the head Calusari, the Boy Meets World episode "Turkey Day" as an outspoken trailer park resident, and Frasier as a vagrant who requests a kiss from Martin Crane.

== Death ==
Kuter died on November 12, 2003, from pulmonary complications at St. Joseph's Hospital in Burbank, California, aged 78. He never married and had no children and was survived by his sister Jean Kuter Harvey of Las Vegas and nieces and nephews and great nieces and nephews. He is buried in Forest Lawn Memorial Park – Hollywood Hills.

== Filmography ==
=== Television ===
Year	Title	Role	Notes	Ref.
1959	Frontier Doctor	Slim Perkins	Episode: "Superstition Mountain"	
1964–1970	Petticoat Junction	Newt Kiley		
1965–1970	Green Acres	Newt Kiley		
1969–1970	The Virginian	Jonah Sills, Will	2 episodes	
1991	Star Trek: The Next Generation	Cytherian	Episode: "The Nth Degree"	
1993	Star Trek: Deep Space Nine	Sirah	Episode: "The Storyteller"	
1993	Seinfeld	Priest	Episode: "The Conversion"	
1994	In Search of Dr. Seuss	Dr. Seuss (voice)	Television film	
1995	The X-Files	Head Calusari	Episode: "The Calusari"	
1995	Fantastic Four	Ego the Living Planet (voice)	Episode: "To Battle the Living Planet"	
1995	Izzy's Quest for Olympic Gold	Citius (voice)	Television film	
1999	Beyond Belief: Fact or Fiction	Anatole Guttenoff	Episode: "Anatole"	

=== Film ===
Year	Title	Role	Notes	Ref.
1954	Sabrina	Ernest	Uncredited	
1954	Drum Beat	Veteran Soldier	Uncredited	
1954	Désirée	Lackey	Uncredited	
1955	City of Shadows	Bartender Kink		
1955	The Cobweb	Patient	Uncredited	
1955	Guys and Dolls	Calvin		
1956	The Steel Jungle	Stringbean		
1956	The Mole People	Priest	Uncredited	
1957	The True Story of Jesse James	Fleming	Uncredited	
1957	Designing Woman	Hotel Clerk	Uncredited	
1957	Under Fire	Arnold Swanson	Uncredited	
1958	The Light in the Forest	Fiddler	Uncredited	
1959	The FBI Story	Barber	Uncredited	
1960	The Big Night	Mailman		
1964	Mary Poppins	Man in Bank	Uncredited	
1967	A Time for Killing	Owelson		
1970	Watermelon Man	Dr. Wainright		
1984	The Last Starfighter	Ambassador Enduran		
1987	Zombie High	Dean Eisner		
1989	Warlock	Proctor		
1989	Gross Anatomy	Professor		
1992	Love Field	Announcer (voice)		
1993	The Seventh Coin	Professor Walker		
1995	Babe	Man at Sheep Trial	Uncredited	
1997	Annabelle's Wish	Santa Claus (voice)	Direct-to-video	
1998	The Jungle Book: Mowgli's Story	Biranyi (voice)	Direct-to-video	
2000	The Little Mermaid II: Return to the Sea	Grimsby (voice)	Direct-to-video	
2001	The Hollywood Sign	Robbie Kant		
2003	Grand Theft Parsons	Undertaker		
2005	Forbidden Warrior	Yawn	Posthumous release	

=== Video games ===
Year	Title	Role	Notes	Ref.
1995	The Beast Within: A Gabriel Knight Mystery	Werner Huber	Live-action	
1997	The Curse of Monkey Island	Griswold Goodsoup		
1998	Grim Fandango	Dockmaster Velasco, Croupier		
1998	Heretic II	Siernan		
2001	Emperor: Battle for Dune	Unit Response Voices		
2001	Arcanum: Of Steamworks and Magick Obscura	Kan Hua, Narrator		
