= Leo K. Kuter =

American art director

Leo K. Kuter (born Leo Edwin Kuter; February 21, 1897 – August 10, 1970) was an American film art director. Active in Hollywood for over forty years, he was most known for his work at Warner Brothers from 1933 to 1965 and for designing the RKO "radio tower astride the globe" logo.

Kuter was born in Shannon, Illinois and moved with his family to Los Angeles in 1911, where he graduated from Manual Arts High School. His film career began in 1920, as a draftsman for Famous Players–Lasky. During the subsequent decade, he worked in various (often uncredited) capacities, including as set designer and art director, for multiple studios, including Metro, Universal, RKO, William Fox, and Warner Brothers. He settled at Warner Brothers in 1933 and stayed there for thirty-two years, moving from set designer to assistant art director to art director.

During his thirty-two years at Warners, Kuter was the art director of such notable films as Destination Tokyo, Hollywood Canteen, Key Largo, and Rio Bravo. In addition to his credited work, Kuter was active in professional, labor, and educational organizations. He was one of the founders of the Society of Motion Picture Art Directors and served as its president for two terms. Kuter lectured on art direction at the University of Southern California from 1948 to 1956. He also wrote numerous articles for books and journals about his craft.

== Personal life ==
Kuter was married to the former Evelyn Edler (sometimes identified as a silent screen actress) from 1925 until his death. They had two children, one son, television and film actor Kay E. Kuter, and one daughter. Leo Kuter died of cancer in Laguna Beach, California, on August 10, 1970. In 1992, his children donated his papers to the Academy of Motion Picture Arts and Sciences' Margaret Herrick Library.

== Credited filmography ==
- Trifling Women (1922)
- Dangerous Innocence (1925)
- The Hurricane Kid (1925)
- Smouldering Fires (1925)
- Sporting Life (1925)
- The Teaser (1925)
- Skinner's Dress Suit (1926)
- What Happened to Jones (1926)
- Captain Salvation (1927)
- Hangman's House (1928)
- Northern Pursuit (1943)
- Thank Your Lucky Stars (1943)
- Destination Tokyo (1944)
- Hollywood Canteen (1944)
- The Last Ride (1944)
- The Very Thought of You (1944)
- Confidential Agent (1945)
- Pillow to Post (1945)
- Pride of the Marines (1945)
- Two Guys from Milwaukee (1946)
- That Way with Women (1947)
- The Unfaithful (1947)
- Always Together (1948)
- Key Largo (1948)
- To the Victor (1948)
- Flamingo Road (1949)
- South of St. Louis (1949)
- Task Force (1949)
- Chain Lightning (1950)
- Highway 301 (1950)
- Close to My Heart (1951)
- Come Fill the Cup (1951)
- I Was a Communist for the F.B.I. (1951)
- Operation Pacific (1951)
- The Tanks Are Coming (1951)
- Storm Warning (1951)
- Operation Secret (1952)
- This Woman Is Dangerous (1952)
- April in Paris (1953)
- By the Light of the Silvery Moon (1953)
- Three Sailors and a Girl (1953)
- Trouble Along the Way (1953)
- The Jazz Singer (1953)
- The Boy from Oklahoma (1954)
- Drum Beat (1954)
- Target Zero (1955)
- Miracle in the Rain (1956)
- Our Miss Brooks (1956)
- The Steel Jungle (1956)
- Bombers B-52 (1957)
- The Deep Six (1958)
- Onionhead (1958)
- Rio Bravo (1959)
- A Summer Place (1959)
- The Dark at the Top of the Stairs (1960)
- Susan Slade (1961)
- Parrish (1961)
- The Sins of Rachel Cade (1961)
- House of Women (1962)
- Rome Adventure (1962)
- PT 109 (1963)
- Youngblood Hawke (1964)
- Ensign Pulver (1964)
- Three on a Couch (1966)
