= Laurie Cutting =

Special education researcher

Academic background
- Education: American University (BA); Northwestern University (MA, PhD)

Academic work
- Discipline: Psychologist
- Sub-discipline: Cognitive science; Learning sciences

Laurie Cutting is an American scholar of psychology and pediatrics. She is the Patricia and Rodes Hart Professor of Special Education, Psychology and Human Development, Radiology, and Pediatrics at Vanderbilt University. In addition, she is associate director of the Vanderbilt Kennedy Center and a member of the Vanderbilt Brain Institute, training faculty for Vanderbilt's Neuroscience Ph.D. program.

Cutting is also a Senior Scientist at Haskins Laboratories and a member of the Haskins Global Literacy Hub. She was selected to be the 2017–2018 Joe B. Wyatt Distinguished University Professor at Vanderbilt University and received an NIH MERIT Award in 2018. Cutting serves on many boards and scientific advisory committees, including the National Center for Learning Disabilities and The Dyslexia Foundation. In 2002–2003, she completed an AAAS NIH science policy fellowship, and from 2007 to 2009, she was appointed to the Federal Reading First Advisory Panel.

Prior to joining the faculty at Vanderbilt, she was a research scientist at the Kennedy Krieger Institute and an associate professor of neurology at the Johns Hopkins School of Medicine and an associate professor of education at Johns Hopkins University. While working on her doctorate at Northwestern University, she interned at Yale University School of Medicine's Center for Learning and Attention and the National Institute of Child Health and Human Development.
