= Carleton Ultimate Team =

Men's ultimate team at Carleton College

The Carleton Ultimate Team (CUT) is the men's Division I club ultimate team at Carleton College in Northfield, Minnesota. A perennial national contender, the team won national championships in 2001, 2009, 2011, 2017 & 2025.

== History ==
The Carleton Ultimate Team was founded in 1977 as Carleton Ultimate and was renamed two years later to the Frisbee Union of Carleton Knights. It adopted it's official current title, CUT, in 1984. In the late 1980s there was a concerted campaign to make the team more competitive through winter conditioning, specializing players in defense, and recruiting athletes from varsity sports teams on campus. CUT made nationals for the first time in 1990, which was the beginning of a 16-year qualifying streak. At the 2001 nationals in Boston, MA, CUT won its first championship over Colorado 15–11. 2006 marked the end of CUT's 16 year nationals streak when the team lost to Wisconsin 12–15 in the Central Regional Final (the region only had one bid that year). The team made semifinals every year from 2008 to 2013, including a finals berth in 2010 and national championships in 2009 and 2011. The 2014 team overcame the death of three of its players to finish tied for 9th. The rebuilding effort resulted in a third-place regional finish in 2015 (only the second year since 1990 that the team did not qualify for nationals), a T-13th finish in their return to nationals in 2016, and a fourth national championship in 2017. After the Covid-19 pandemic, Carleton participated in the 2021 winter College Championships but withdrew after a positive Covid-19 test was reported during its first game. In 2025, CUT captured its 5th national title in program history, defeating Colorado 15-12 in the final. The team returned to the national final in 2026, finishing runner-up to Massachusetts.

=== 2010-2011 ===
The 2010-2011 season saw CUT win two major regular season tournaments on its way to the second national championship in three years. In mid February the team traveled to Tampa, FL and won the Florida Warmup over a field where 8 of the 9 teams had competed at Nationals the previous year. A few weeks later in early March, CUT competed in the Stanford Invite, a high-level tourney where 13 of the 18 teams qualified for 2011 Nationals. CUT went undefeated on the weekend, winning the tournament with a +46 goal differential. Over Carleton's spring break, the team drove from Minnesota to Wilmington, North Carolina to play in Easterns which also featured a strong field, 10 of the 16 teams in attendance earning a spot at Nationals later in the year. This was CUT's first tourney loss of the season, losing in a close battle with 2010 champs Florida in the semifinals.

CUT entered the USA Ultimate Championship series as the first ranked team in the country. CUT won the Northwoods Conference Championships, held on Carleton's campus. North Central regionals were moved at the last minute from Appleton to Madison, WI due to storms in the area. CUT was looking to defend its regional title, but after qualifying for nationals on Saturday with a 15-8 win over Iowa, could not pull out a late game comeback versus Wisconsin in the finals, falling 11–14 in a windy game. Immediately after the finals, the team packed up and drove across town to the other field site to face Iowa in the 2/3 game. Iowa, fresh off of earning their spot in the national's field, came out fired up and got revenge for their loss to CUT 24-hours earlier. CUT took third in the region, which set them up to be the 9th seed at Nationals.

Despite being the 9th seed out of a field of 20 teams, CUT took first place in their pool, beating Harvard, British Columbia, Cornell, and Whitman. CUT then moved on to the quarterfinals, where they beat Stanford. They moved on to the semifinals, where they played Iowa. Despite losing to Iowa at Regionals, CUT won 15–10 and advanced to the finals for the third year in a row. CUT would face Wisconsin in the finals, their perennial rival in the Central Region. As the finals were about to begin, the wind started to pick up, eventually gusting to 40+ mph. However, CUT managed to score upwind 3 times, something that Wisconsin would not do the entire game. CUT went on to win 11–5 and captured their 3rd national title.

=== 2016-2017 ===
With a promising 2016 postseason, a strong nucleus of returning talent, and the top recruiting class in the country, CUT entered 2017 as Ultiworld's #2 power-ranked team. The team came away from Florida Warm Up with some questions, having finished 4-3 but missing the bracket. The team's Sunday woes continued at Stanford Invite and Easterns, at which CUT performed well in pool play, but lost in quarters to Oregon and UMass, respectively. However, the consistent ability to beat and often blow out nationals contenders kept Carleton high in the computerized rankings as they entered the postseason. At Northwoods Conferences, CUT and Minnesota both advanced to meet in the final, where CUT won 12–10 to take the conference title and the top seed at regionals. At the three-bid North Central Regionals in Blaine, Minnesota, Carleton again defeated Wisconsin but lost the final to Minnesota on universe point.

CUT entered Nationals as the 6th overall seed and the second in their pool. CUT defeated Auburn to open the tournament, then lost 15–10 to third-seeded North Carolina. The following day, CUT defeated 19th-seeded Oregon State 15–8 and then Colorado 15–8. A 15-10 prequarters win against Michigan set up a quarterfinal against Minnesota, in which Carleton came back from an 8-5 halftime deficit to avenge their regionals loss 12-10, sending the team back to semifinals for the first time since 2013. The matchup against top-seeded UMass lived up to its billing, going to universe point, where Carleton's offense had two goals called back before punching in the third attempt for a 15-14 win. In the final, broadcast on ESPNU, CUT defeated UNC Wilmington 15–11 to win its fourth national championship.

=== 2019 ===
CUT failed to reach Nationals after getting upset by Iowa State ISUC in the regionals semis and then losing to Wisconsin in the 3rd place Game to Go.

=== 2021 ===
After the rise of the Covid-19 Pandemic canceled two years of nationals in a row, the governing body for collegiate ultimate, USAU, extended eligibility for all graduates who had lost a season to the pandemic. With 6 years worth of players on the team, CUT was looking very strong for nationals in the winter of 2021, boasting an impressively large 42-player roster. The roster was also dotted with various club ultimate stars, including two players from Ring of Fire, the then-defending club champions. Having swept regionals, CUT came to nationals in California ready to take on a strong pool. After going up against UNC Wilmington 4-1, however, the game was called to a halt by observers, who reported that a player on CUT had announced a positive Covid-19 test. Several other players tested positive, leading to the withdrawal of CUT from the tournament.

=== 2022–2026 ===
Carleton missed the College Championships in 2022 but returned in 2023 after winning the North Central Regional Championship with a 12–11 victory over Minnesota. In 2024, CUT qualified for Nationals again but went winless in pool play.

In 2025, Carleton won its fifth national championship, defeating Massachusetts 15–10 in the semifinal and Colorado 15–12 in the final in Burlington, Washington. The title tied Carleton with North Carolina for the second-most D-I men's championships, behind UC Santa Barbara's six. Junior Declan Miller was named the division's Player of the Year by Ultiworld. The team was coached by five CUT alumni: Dillon Lanier, Tim Schoch, Noah Hanson, Joe White, and Sol Yanuck. The staff, which succeeded longtime coach Phil Bowen, was named the division's Coaches of the Year by Ultiworld.

Carleton returned to the championship game in 2026, defeating Pittsburgh 15–10 in the quarterfinal and Colorado 15–14 in the semifinal before losing to Massachusetts 15–11 in the final in Rockford, Illinois.

== 2014 team tragedy ==
On 28 February 2014, three CUT players were killed in a car accident while en route to the Stanford Invite tournament at Stanford University. A fourth member of the team and a fifth occupant, a friend of the team, were injured in the crash, which happened near the Carleton campus. The players were transporting themselves in a sport-utility vehicle which lost control on a snow-covered road and was turned sideways into the path of a semitrailer truck.

== See also ==
- List of accidents involving sports teams
