= Jack Cutting =

Jack Cutting may refer to:

- Jack Cutting (animator) (1908–1988), American animator
- Jack Cutting (footballer) (1924–1985), English footballer

== See also ==
- John Cutting (disambiguation)
