= Bowman Cutter =

American economist, political thinker and businessman

- Born: W. Bowman Cutter
- Education: Harvard University; Princeton University; Balliol College, Oxford
- Occupations: Economist, academic, and businessman

W. Bowman Cutter is an American economist, academic, and businessman.

== Education ==
Cutter holds degrees from Harvard University, the Woodrow Wilson School of Public and International Affairs at Princeton University, and Balliol College, Oxford as a Rhodes Scholar (elected in 1964).

== Career ==
Bowman Cutter was an Office of Management and Budget Review Team Leader for the Obama-Biden Transition Committee Agency Review Groups. He served on the National Economic Council as Robert Rubin's Deputy, from 1993 to 1996 and at the Office of Management and Budget from 1976 to 1981.

Cutter was managing director of Warburg Pincus from 1996 to 2009. He currently serves as chairman of CARE and chairman of MicroVest, and is a member of the board for the Committee for Economic Development, The Atlantic Council, SeaChange Capital Partners, and Resources for the Future. From 1981 to 1993, he was vice chairman and managing partner at Coopers & Lybrand.
