= John Cutting =

John Cutting may refer to:

- John Cutting (psychiatrist), British psychiatrist and writer
- John T. Cutting (1844–1911), U.S. Representative
- John Cutting (MP) for Orford (UK Parliament constituency)

== See also ==
- Jack Cutting (disambiguation)
