= LineOne =

British internet provider

Lineone
- Type: Defunct
- Industry: Internet & Communications
- Founded: 1997
- Headquarters: United Kingdom
- Products: Internet service

LineOne was an Internet service provider in the United Kingdom in the 1990s. LineOne was a joint venture of News International, United News & Media and British Telecom. It then became the UK branch of Tiscali, which is now TalkTalk.

As of October 2017, the "lineone.net" domain is still active for email (username@lineone.net) and website hosting (website.lineone.net/~username). More recently (October 2019), TalkTalk has notified LineOne customers that from 10 December 2019, unless they pay £5 per month or £50 per year or sign up to the TalkTalk broadband service, they will lose most Talk Talk features, will only have access to their mails through webmail and will start closing down free e-mail accounts.

== History ==
Before LineOne was launched in 1997 as a joint venture between News International and British Telecom, it was known as Springboard Internet Services and previously to that Delphi. This is not to be confused with, although it's related to, the company known as Delphi in the United States which had been purchased by News Corporation shortly before, and then sold on, and whose embryonic UK offerings were overseen by News International. Andrew Burke was the founding CEO and had previously run News International's Internet Publishing division responsible for putting The Times, Sunday Times, The Sun, News of the World and Today onto the web as well as Delphi in the UK.

The official LineOne launch coincided with the publication of the 1997 Sunday Times 'Rich List'. The set up software was given away free with each copy of that weekend's Sunday Times. At this time the Helpdesk was run by BT from their office in Colindale, North London.

In 1998, United News & Media bought a 33% stake in the company for an undisclosed sum.

LineOne offered customers 0845 (Local Rate) access to the Internet (which required a monthly subscription) as well as offering e-mail and web hosting services, which were included in the subscription fee.

Freeserve launched in 1998, and was the first major ISP to offer a subscription free dialup service that only charged the standard per minute local call rate for access. LineOne was forced to follow suit with the same service to stem the flow of dialup customers and pressured BT into providing the infrastructure, which it did so and at considerable expense to LineOne.

== From LineOne to Tiscali ==
In March 1999, News International sold its shares in LineOne as it was concentrating on its own internet services, making British Telecom and United News & Media each 50% owners of LineOne. LineOne moved its offices to Blackfriar's Bridge from the offices they once occupied next to News International's printworks in Wapping. Ajay Chowdhury from United News & Media took over as CEO of LineOne and together with a new team including Mary Turner from AOL and Andy Harwood built LineOne into one of the largest ISP's and most trafficked portals in the UK. Chowdhury left in 2000 to set up NBC Internet Europe and Mary Turner was appointed the General Manager of LineOne.

LineOne was then put up for sale after it became obvious that everyone involved was not going to make the hundreds of millions of pounds that LineOne was originally valued at in the middle of the dot-com bubble and it was bought by Italian telecommunications giant Tiscali on 26 April 2001 for GBP £62,000,000 (EUR €100,000,000).

It was rumoured that before this sale, another large telecommunications giant had offered three to four times as much a year earlier and that by holding out for more money, the LineOne management missed the boat.

At the time of acquisition, LineOne had 1.85 million subscribers, though the number of active users was probably around the 800,000 mark at the time.

In June 2009, The UK operations of Tiscali were sold to TalkTalk Group, part of The Carphone Warehouse plc. The LineOne point of presence continues to be served by this company. The acquisition was completed on 6 July 2009.
