= Ephraim Cutter =

American physician

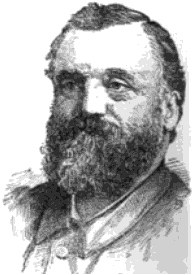
- Born: September 1, 1832; Woburn, Massachusetts
- Died: April 25, 1917 (aged 84); West Falmouth, Massachusetts
- Education: Yale University; Harvard University Medical School; University of Pennsylvania
- Occupations: Physician, inventor
- Spouses: Rebecca Smith (m. 1856; died 1899) Anna L. Davidson (m. 1901)
- Children: 9

Ephraim Cutter (September 1, 1832 – April 25, 1917) was a United States physician and inventor. He was a pioneer of laryngology in the United States and discovered the tuberculosis cattle test in 1894.

== Early life ==
Ephraim Cutter was born in Woburn, Massachusetts on September 1, 1832. After preparing for college at Warren Academy in Woburn, he graduated from Yale University in 1852 (A.B.).

After teaching for a year at Warren Academy, he began his medical studies, eventually getting M.D. degrees from Harvard (1856), and the University of Pennsylvania (1857).

== Career ==
He practiced medicine in Woburn until 1875, in Cambridge and Boston until 1881, when he moved to New York and practiced there (1881–1901).

He invented a large number of surgical instruments; contributed over 400 articles to literature on scientific subjects, including microscopic medicine, laryngology, chronic diseases, and general medicine; and became a member of the Massachusetts Medical Society in 1856, and of the American Medical Association in 1871.

He was a pioneer of laryngology in the United States. He studied the morphology of raw beef from 1854 and discovered the tuberculosis cattle test in 1894. He made investigations into electrotherapeutics, in 1871 demonstrating that galvanic currents could reach deep into the body. In his later career, he took an interest in nutrition as well as cancer.

In 1901, he retired and moved to West Falmouth, Massachusetts.

== Personal life ==
He married twice: in 1856, he married Rebecca Smith, with whom he had nine children; she died in 1899, and in 1901 he married Anna L. Davidson, who survived him.

He was deacon and clerk of the First Congregational Church in Woburn from 1864 to 1874. With his first wife, he was instrumental in organizing the Church of the Comforter in the Bronx, and was a lay member of the General Synod of the Reformed Church in the United States in 1898. He wrote much on church music.

Ephraim Cutter died at his home in West Falmouth on April 25, 1917.
