= William Richard Cutter =

American historian, genealogist, and writer

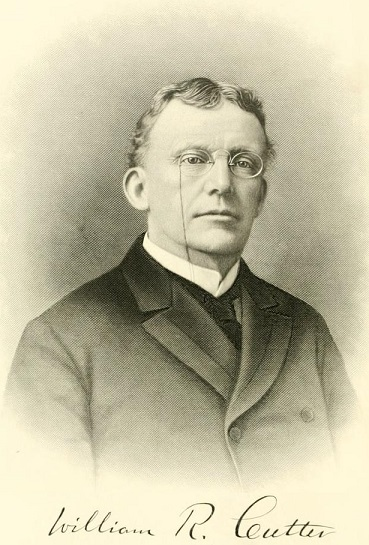
- Born: August 17, 1847; Woburn, Massachusetts, United States
- Died: June 6, 1918 (aged 70); Woburn, Massachusetts
- Education: Norwich University
- Occupations: Historian, genealogist, writer

William Richard Cutter (August 17, 1847 – June 6, 1918) was an American historian, librarian, genealogist, and writer.

== Life ==
Born in Woburn, Massachusetts, on August 17, 1847, he was the son of Dr. Benjamin Cutter and Mary Whittemore Cutter. He attended the Woburn Public School and the Warren Academy. He developed an interest in genealogy and history from his father, and was able to conduct further research while at Yale University, building upon the genealogy of the Cutter family and historical documents begun by his father. He received his Master of Arts degree from Norwich University.

He was married to Mary Elizabeth Kimball and lived in Lexington, Massachusetts. They had a daughter, Sarah, who was born in 1873 and died in 1890. Cutter died on June 6, 1918, in Woburn.

== Career ==
He was a secretary of the Trustees of Warren Academy. He was a member of the Massachusetts Society of Colonial Wars. He also served as President of the Rumford Historical Association. He served as the second librarian of the Winn Memorial Library, where he continued development of the historical manuscript repository during his tenure as librarian (1882-1909) and librarian emeritus (1909-1918). He was a member of the New England Historic Genealogical Society until 1911.

== Bibliography ==
His notable books are:

- A History of the Cutter Family of New England
- Historic homes and places and genealogical and personal memoirs relating to the families of Middlesex County, Massachusetts
- Genealogical and personal memoirs relating to the families of the state of Massachusetts
- Encyclopedia of Massachusetts: Biographical-Genealogical
- New England Families, Genealogical and Memorial
