= World Junior Ultimate Championships =

International frisbee competition

- Frequency: Every two years
- Country: Worldwide
- Founded: 2002
- Organizer: WFDF
- 2026 World Junior Ultimate Championships

The World Junior Ultimate Championships is an international ultimate frisbee competition organized by the World Flying Disc Federation for players under the age of 20. It is held every two years. Teams from across the world compete in two divisions: open and women's. A mixed division has been included since 2022.

== Edition ==
Year	Date	Host	Top nation
1983	August 29 – September 3	Gothenburg, Sweden	—N/a
1984	September 2–9	Lucerne, Switzerland	—N/a
1986	August 25–31	Colchester, United Kingdom	—N/a
1988	August 29 – September 3	Leuven, Belgium	—N/a
1990	July 8–14	Oslo, Norway	—N/a
1992	August 17–23	Utsunomiya, Japan	—N/a
1994	August 21–28	Colchester, United Kingdom	—N/a
1996	August 10–17	Jönköping, Sweden	—N/a
1998	August 15–22	Blaine, MN, United States	—N/a
2000	August 12–20	Heilbronn, Germany	—N/a
2002	July 10–13	Riga, Latvia	Canada
2004	August 1–7	Turku, Finland	—N/a
2006	August 13–18	Devens, MA, United States	United States
2008	August 2–9	Vancouver, Canada	United States
2010	August 2–7	Heilbronn, Germany	United States
2012	August 12–18	Dublin, Ireland	Colombia; United States
2014	July 20–26	Lecco, Italy	Canada; United States
2016	July 31 – August 6	Wrocław, Poland	Canada; United States
2018	August 18–25	Waterloo, Canada	United States
2020	Cancelled due to COVID-19		
2022	August 6–13	Wroclaw, Poland	United States
2024	July 21–27	Birmingham, United Kingdom	United States
2026	July 11-18, 2026	Logroño, Spain	Canada

== Medal table ==
Rank	Nation	Gold	Silver	Bronze	Total
1	United States	17	7	6	30
2	Sweden	7	4	2	13
3	Canada	6	14	6	26
4	France	2	3	1	6
5	Colombia	2	2	3	7
6	Finland	1	3	2	6
7	Japan	1	1	2	4
8	Hungary	1	0	1	2
9	Chinese Taipei	1	0	0	1
10	Germany	0	1	4	5
11	Australia	0	1	1	2
11	Austria	0	1	1	2
11	Switzerland	0	1	1	2
14	Great Britain	0	0	3	3
15	Italy	0	0	2	2
16	Latvia	0	0	1	1
Totals (16 entries)		38	38	36	112
