= 2024 World Junior Ultimate Championships =

International frisbee competition

- Host city: Birmingham, England
- Organizer: WFDF
- Dates: 21–27 July 2024

The 2024 World Junior Ultimate Championships was the 21st edition of the international ultimate frisbee competition organized by World Flying Disc Federation. It was held in Birmingham, England from 21 to 27 July 2024.

== Medal summary ==
Event	Gold	Silver	Bronze
Open	United States	France	Canada
Women's	France	United States	Italy
Mixed	United States	Canada	Hungary

== Medal table ==
* Host nation (Great Britain)

Rank	Nation	Gold	Silver	Bronze	Total
1	United States	2	1	0	3
2	France	1	1	0	2
3	Canada	0	1	1	2
4	Hungary	0	0	1	1
4	Italy	0	0	1	1
Totals (5 entries)		3	3	3	9
