= 2000 World Ultimate & Guts Championships =

International frisbee competition

- Host city: Heilbronn, Germany
- Organizer: WFDF
- Dates: 12–20 August 2000

The 2000 World Ultimate & Guts Championships was the 10th edition of the international ultimate frisbee competition organized by World Flying Disc Federation. They were held in Heilbronn, Germany, from 12 to 20 August 2000.

== Medal summary ==
=== Senior ===
Event	Gold	Silver	Bronze
Open	United States	Sweden	Canada
Women's	Canada	Japan	Finland
Mixed	United States	Canada	Finland
Open masters	United States	Germany	Canada

=== Junior ===
Event	Gold	Silver	Bronze
Open	Sweden	Canada	United States
Women's	United States	Canada	Finland

== Medal table ==
* Host nation (Germany)

Rank	Nation	Gold	Silver	Bronze	Total
1	United States	4	0	1	5
2	Canada	1	3	2	6
3	Sweden	1	1	0	2
4	Germany*	0	1	0	1
4	Japan	0	1	0	1
6	Finland	0	0	3	3
Totals (6 entries)		6	6	6	18
