= World Ultimate Championships =

International frisbee competition

- Frequency: Every four years
- Country: Worldwide
- Founded: 1983
- Organizer: WFDF
- 2024 World Ultimate Championships

The World Ultimate Championships is an international ultimate frisbee competition organized by World Flying Disc Federation. It has been held every four years since 2000. Teams from across the world compete in three divisions: open, women's and mixed.

== Edition ==
Year	Date	Host	Top nation
1983	August 29–September 3	Goteborg, Sweden	United States
1984	September 2–9	Luzerne, Switzerland	Sweden
1986	August 25–31	Colchester, United Kingdom	United States
1988	August 29–September 3	Leuven, Belgium	United States
1990	July 8–14	Oslo, Norway	United States
1992	August 17–23	Utsunomiya, Japan	Japan
1994	August 21–28	Colchester, United Kingdom	United States
1996	August 10–17	Jonkoping, Sweden	Sweden
1998	August 15–22	Blaine, MN, United States	Canada
2000	August 12–20	Heilbronn, Germany	United States
2004	August 1–7	Turku, Finland	Canada
2008	August 2–9	Vancouver, Canada	United States
2012	July 7–14	Sakai, Japan	United States
2016	June 18–25	London, United Kingdom	United States
2021	Cancelled due to COVID-19		
2024	August 31–September 7	Gold Coast, Australia	United States
2028			

== Medal table ==
Rank	Nation	Gold	Silver	Bronze	Total
1	United States	34	7	5	46
2	Canada	10	12	10	32
3	Sweden	3	9	4	16
4	Japan	3	8	8	19
5	Finland	1	4	7	12
6	Australia	0	3	5	8
7	Germany	0	2	3	5
7	Great Britain	0	2	3	5
9	Netherlands	0	2	1	3
10	Colombia	0	2	0	2
11	New Zealand	0	0	2	2
12	Austria	0	0	1	1
12	France	0	0	1	1
12	West Germany	0	0	1	1
Totals (14 entries)		51	51	51	153
