= 2012 World Ultimate & Guts Championships =

International frisbee competition

- Host city: Sakai, Japan
- Organizer: WFDF
- Dates: 7–14 July 2012

The 2012 World Ultimate & Guts Championships was the 13th edition of the international ultimate frisbee competition organized by World Flying Disc Federation. They were held in Sakai, Japan, from 7 to 14 July 2012.

== Medal summary ==
Event	Gold	Silver	Bronze
Open	United States	United Kingdom	Canada
Women's	Japan	United States	Canada
Mixed	Canada	Australia	Japan
Open masters	Canada	Australia	Japan
Women's masters	United States	Canada	Japan
Guts	Japan red	United States	Japan white

== Medal table ==
* Host nation (Japan)

Rank	Nation	Gold	Silver	Bronze	Total
1	United States	2	2	0	4
2	Canada	2	1	2	5
3	Japan*	2	0	4	6
4	Australia	0	2	0	2
5	Great Britain	0	1	0	1
Totals (5 entries)		6	6	6	18
