= 2022 World Junior Ultimate Championships =

International frisbee competition

- Host city: Wroclaw, Poland
- Organizer: WFDF
- Dates: 6–13 August 2022

The 2022 World Junior Ultimate Championships was the 20th edition of the international ultimate frisbee competition organized by World Flying Disc Federation. They were held in Wrocław, Poland, from 6 to 13 August 2022.

== Medal summary ==
Event	Gold	Silver	Bronze
Open	United States	France	Italy
Women's	United States	France	Canada
Mixed	Hungary	Switzerland	Sweden

== Medal table ==
* Host nation (Poland)

Rank	Nation	Gold	Silver	Bronze	Total
1	United States	2	0	0	2
2	Hungary	1	0	0	1
3	France	0	2	0	2
4	Switzerland	0	1	0	1
5	Canada	0	0	1	1
5	Italy	0	0	1	1
5	Sweden	0	0	1	1
Totals (7 entries)		3	3	3	9
