= 2014 World Junior Ultimate Championships =

International frisbee competition

- Host city: Lecco, Italy
- Organizer: WFDF
- Dates: 20–26 July 2014

The 2014 World Junior Ultimate Championships was the 17th edition of the international ultimate frisbee competition organized by World Flying Disc Federation. They were held in Lecco, Italy, from 20 to 26 July 2014.

== Medal summary ==
Event	Gold	Silver	Bronze
Open	Canada	United States	Germany
Women's	United States	Canada	Colombia

== Medal table ==
* Host nation (Italy)

Rank	Nation	Gold	Silver	Bronze	Total
1	Canada	1	1	0	2
1	United States	1	1	0	2
3	Colombia	0	0	1	1
3	Germany	0	0	1	1
Totals (4 entries)		2	2	2	6
