= 2026 World Junior Ultimate Championships =

International frisbee competition

- Host city: Logroño, Spain
- Organizer: WFDF
- Dates: 11–18 July 2026

The 2026 World Junior Ultimate Championships was the 22nd edition of the international ultimate frisbee competition organized by World Flying Disc Federation. It will take place in Logroño, Spain from 11 to 18 July 2026.

== Medal summary ==
Event	Gold	Silver	Bronze
Open	Canada	United States	Japan
Women's	France	Canada	Japan
Mixed	United States	Canada	Switzerland

== Medal table ==
* Host nation (Spain)

Rank	Nation	Gold	Silver	Bronze	Total
1	Canada	1	2	0	3
2	United States	1	1	0	2
3	France	1	0	0	1
4	Japan	0	0	2	2
5	Switzerland	0	0	1	1
Totals (5 entries)		3	3	3	9
