= 2006 World Junior Ultimate Championships =

International frisbee competition

- Host city: Devens, MA, United States
- Organizer: WFDF
- Dates: 13–18 August 2006

The 2006 World Junior Ultimate Championships was the 13th edition of the international ultimate frisbee competition organized by World Flying Disc Federation. They were held in Devens, MA, United States from 13 to 18 August 2006.

== Medal summary ==
| Event | Gold | Silver | Bronze |
|---|---|---|---|
| Open | United States | Canada | Colombia |
| Women's | United States | Canada | Australia |

== Medal table ==
* Host nation (United States)

| Rank | Nation | Gold | Silver | Bronze | Total |
|---|---|---|---|---|---|
| 1 | United States* | 2 | 0 | 0 | 2 |
| 2 | Canada | 0 | 2 | 0 | 2 |
| 3 | Australia | 0 | 0 | 1 | 1 |
| 3 | Colombia | 0 | 0 | 1 | 1 |
| Totals (4 entries) | | 2 | 2 | 2 | 6 |
