= 2024 World Ultimate Championships =

International frisbee competition

- Host city: Gold Coast, Australia
- Organizer: WFDF
- Dates: 31 August – 7 September 2024

The 2024 World Ultimate Championships was the 15th edition of the international ultimate frisbee competition organized by World Flying Disc Federation. They were held in Gold Coast, Australia from 31 August to 7 September 2024.

== Medal summary ==
Event	Gold	Silver	Bronze
Open	United States	Japan	Australia
Women's	United States	Colombia	Australia
Mixed	United States	Canada	France

== Medal table ==
* Host nation (Australia)

Rank	Nation	Gold	Silver	Bronze	Total
1	United States	3	0	0	3
2	Canada	0	1	0	1
2	Colombia	0	1	0	1
2	Japan	0	1	0	1
5	Australia*	0	0	2	2
6	France	0	0	1	1
Totals (6 entries)		3	3	3	9
