= 2018 World Junior Ultimate Championships =

International frisbee competition

- Host city: Waterloo, Ontario, Canada
- Organizer: WFDF
- Dates: 18–25 August 2018

The 2018 World Junior Ultimate Championships was the 19th edition of the international ultimate frisbee competition organized by World Flying Disc Federation. It was held in Waterloo, Ontario, Canada from 18 to 25 August 2018.

== Medal summary ==
Event	Gold	Silver	Bronze
Open	United States	Canada	France
Women's	United States	Colombia	Canada

== Medal table ==
* Host nation (Canada)

Rank	Nation	Gold	Silver	Bronze	Total
1	United States	2	0	0	2
2	Canada*	0	1	1	2
3	Colombia	0	1	0	1
4	France	0	0	1	1
Totals (4 entries)		2	2	2	6
