= 2016 World Junior Ultimate Championships =

International frisbee competition

- Host city: Wrocław, Poland
- Organizer: WFDF
- Dates: 31 July – 6 August 2016

The 2016 World Junior Ultimate Championships was the 18th edition of the international ultimate frisbee competition organized by World Flying Disc Federation. The tournament was held in Wrocław, Poland, from 31 July to 6 August 2016.

== Medal summary ==
Event	Gold	Silver	Bronze
Open	United States	Canada	United Kingdom
Women's	Canada	United States	Colombia

== Medal table ==
* Host nation (Poland)

Rank	Nation	Gold	Silver	Bronze	Total
1	Canada	1	1	0	2
1	United States	1	1	0	2
3	Colombia	0	0	1	1
3	Great Britain	0	0	1	1
Totals (4 entries)		2	2	2	6
