= 2010 World Junior Ultimate Championships =

International frisbee competition

- Host city: Heilbronn, Germany
- Organizer: WFDF
- Dates: 2–7 August 2010

The 2010 World Junior Ultimate Championships was the 15th edition of the international ultimate frisbee competition organized by World Flying Disc Federation. They were held in Heilbronn, Germany, from 2 to 7 August 2010.

== Medal summary ==
Event	Gold	Silver	Bronze
Open	United States	Canada	United Kingdom
Women's	Colombia	Canada	United States

== Medal table ==
* Host nation (Germany)

Rank	Nation	Gold	Silver	Bronze	Total
1	United States	1	0	1	2
2	Colombia	1	0	0	1
3	Canada	0	2	0	2
4	Great Britain	0	0	1	1
Totals (4 entries)		2	2	2	6
