= 2016 World Ultimate & Guts Championships =

International frisbee competition

- Host city: London, United Kingdom
- Organizer: WFDF
- Dates: 18–25 June 2016

The 2016 World Ultimate & Guts Championships was the 14th edition of the international ultimate frisbee competition organized by World Flying Disc Federation. They were held in London, United Kingdom, from 18 to 25 June 2016.

== Medal summary ==
Event	Gold	Silver	Bronze
Open	United States	Japan	Australia
Women's	United States	Colombia	Canada
Mixed	United States	Australia	Canada
Open masters	United States	Canada	United Kingdom
Women's masters	United States	Canada	Australia
Guts	United States 1	Japan	United Kingdom

== Medal table ==
* Host nation (Great Britain)

Rank	Nation	Gold	Silver	Bronze	Total
1	United States	6	0	0	6
2	Canada	0	2	2	4
3	Japan	0	2	0	2
4	Australia	0	1	2	3
5	Colombia	0	1	0	1
6	Great Britain*	0	0	2	2
Totals (6 entries)		6	6	6	18
