= 2012 World Junior Ultimate Championships =

International frisbee competition

- Host city: Dublin, Ireland
- Organizer: WFDF
- Dates: 12–18 August 2012

The 2012 World Junior Ultimate Championships was the 16th edition of the international ultimate frisbee competition organized by World Flying Disc Federation. They were held in Dublin, Ireland from 12 to 18 August 2012.

== Medal summary ==
Event	Gold	Silver	Bronze
Open	United States	Colombia	Canada
Women's	Colombia	United States	Canada

== Medal table ==
* Host nation (Ireland)

Rank	Nation	Gold	Silver	Bronze	Total
1	Colombia	1	1	0	2
1	United States	1	1	0	2
3	Canada	0	0	2	2
Totals (3 entries)		2	2	2	6
