= 2008 World Ultimate & Guts Championships =

International frisbee competition

- Host city: Vancouver, Canada
- Organizer: WFDF
- Dates: 2–9 August 2008

The 2008 World Ultimate & Guts Championships was the 12th edition of the international ultimate frisbee competition organized by World Flying Disc Federation. They were held in Vancouver, Canada from 2 to 9 August 2008.

== Medal summary ==
=== Senior ===
Event	Gold	Silver	Bronze
Open	Canada	United States	Japan
Women's	United States	Japan	Canada
Mixed	Canada	Japan	United States
Open masters	United States	Canada	New Zealand

=== Junior ===
Event	Gold	Silver	Bronze
Open	United States	Canada	Germany
Women's	Japan	Australia	United States

== Medal table ==
* Host nation (Canada)

Rank	Nation	Gold	Silver	Bronze	Total
1	United States	3	1	2	6
2	Canada*	2	2	1	5
3	Japan	1	2	1	4
4	Australia	0	1	0	1
5	Germany	0	0	1	1
5	New Zealand	0	0	1	1
Totals (6 entries)		6	6	6	18
