= 1986 World Ultimate Championships =

International frisbee competition

- Host city: Colchester, United Kingdom
- Organizer: WFDF
- Dates: 25–31 August 1986

The 1986 World Ultimate Championships was the 3rd edition of the international ultimate frisbee competition organized by World Flying Disc Federation. The competition was held in Colchester, United Kingdom from 25 to 31 August 1986.

In the women's final, the United States defeated the hosts by a score of 18–3.

== Medal summary ==
Event	Gold	Silver	Bronze
Open	United States	Sweden	West Germany
Women's	United States	United Kingdom	Finland
Junior	Sweden	Finland	United Kingdom

== Medal table ==
* Host nation (Great Britain)

Rank	Nation	Gold	Silver	Bronze	Total
1	United States	2	0	0	2
2	Sweden	1	1	0	2
3	Finland	0	1	1	2
3	Great Britain*	0	1	1	2
5	West Germany	0	0	1	1
Totals (5 entries)		3	3	3	9
