= 1988 World Ultimate Championships =

International frisbee competition

- Host city: Leuven, Belgium
- Organizer: WFDF
- Dates: 29 August – 3 September 1988

The 1988 World Ultimate Championships was the 4th edition of the international ultimate frisbee competition organized by World Flying Disc Federation. They were held in Leuven, Belgium from 29 August to 3 September 1988.

== Medal summary ==
Event	Gold	Silver	Bronze
Open	United States	Finland	Sweden
Women's	United States	Netherlands	Sweden
Junior	Sweden	Finland	United States

== Medal table ==
* Host nation (Belgium)

Rank	Nation	Gold	Silver	Bronze	Total
1	United States	2	0	1	3
2	Sweden	1	0	2	3
3	Finland	0	2	0	2
4	Netherlands	0	1	0	1
Totals (4 entries)		3	3	3	9
