= 1994 World Ultimate Championships =

International frisbee competition

- Host city: Colchester, United Kingdom
- Organizer: WFDF
- Dates: 21–28 August 1994

The 1994 World Ultimate Championships was the 7th edition of the international ultimate frisbee competition organized by World Flying Disc Federation. They were held in Colchester, United Kingdom from 21 to 28 August 1994.

== Medal summary ==
Event	Gold	Silver	Bronze
Open	United States	Sweden	Canada
Women's	United States	Netherlands	Canada
Open masters	United States	Canada	Germany
Junior	Sweden	United States	Germany

== Medal table ==
* Host nation (Great Britain)

Rank	Nation	Gold	Silver	Bronze	Total
1	United States	3	1	0	4
2	Sweden	1	1	0	2
3	Canada	0	1	2	3
4	Netherlands	0	1	0	1
5	Germany	0	0	2	2
Totals (5 entries)		4	4	4	12
