= 1990 World Ultimate Championships =

International frisbee competition

- Host city: Oslo, Norway
- Organizer: WFDF
- Dates: 8–14 July 1990

The 1990 World Ultimate Championships was the 5th edition of the international ultimate frisbee competition organized by World Flying Disc Federation. They were held in Oslo, Norway from 8 to 14 July 1990.

== Medal summary ==
Event	Gold	Silver	Bronze
Open	United States	Sweden	Finland
Women's	United States	Sweden	Finland
Open masters	United States	Canada	Germany
Junior	Sweden	Finland	United States

== Medal table ==
* Host nation (Norway)

Rank	Nation	Gold	Silver	Bronze	Total
1	United States	3	0	1	4
2	Sweden	1	2	0	3
3	Finland	0	1	2	3
4	Canada	0	1	0	1
5	Germany	0	0	1	1
Totals (5 entries)		4	4	4	12
