= 2024 Ultimate Frisbee Association season =

- League: Ultimate Frisbee Association
- Sport: Ultimate
- Duration: April 26 – August 24, 2024
- Teams: 24

Regular season
- Season MVP: Jeff Babbitt (BOS) (2)

Postseason
- East Division champions: DC Breeze
- Central Division champions: Minnesota Wind Chill
- West Division champions: Seattle Cascades
- South Division champions: Carolina Flyers
- Postseason MVP: Will Brandt (MIN)

Finals
- Champions: Minnesota Wind Chill
- Runners-up: Carolina Flyers

UFA seasons
- ← 2023 2025 →

The 2024 Ultimate Frisbee Association season was the league's twelfth season, but its first with its new name after rebranding from the American Ultimate Disc League (AUDL) following a partnership with Sport Dimension Inc. (SDI), owner of the "Wham-O" brand. The season ran from April 26 through August 24. No teams were added, removed, moved between divisions, or rebranded between the 2023 and 2024 seasons. The Minnesota Wind Chill won the championship, the team's first. Boston's Jeff Babbitt won the league's MVP for the second year in a row, despite moving from the New York Empire to the Glory during the offseason. Will Brandt won the Championship Weekend MVP.

The league began streaming one game a week for free on YouTube as part of its "Super Series" program.

== Regular season ==
=== Week 1 ===
Date	Home	Goals	Goals	Away
4/26	Houston Havoc	26	21	Dallas Legion
4/26	Boston Glory	19	17	Montreal Royal
4/27	Salt Lake Shred	23	20	DC Breeze
4/27	Carolina Flyers	24	16	Atlanta Hustle
4/27	New York Empire	18	16	Montreal Royal
4/27	Oakland Spiders	20	17	Los Angeles Aviators
4/27	Seattle Cascades	28	14	San Diego Growlers
4/27	Pittsburgh Thunderbirds	11	18	Minnesota Wind Chill
4/28	Oregon Steel	16	23	San Diego Growlers

=== Week 2 ===
Date	Home	Goals	Goals	Away
5/3	Austin Sol	25	14	Houston Havoc
5/3	San Diego Growlers	17	19	Salt Lake Shred
5/3	Oakland Spiders	21	22	Seattle Cascades
5/4	Atlanta Hustle	20	15	New York Empire
5/4	Los Angeles Aviators	20	23	Salt Lake Shred
5/4	Boston Glory	21	13	Toronto Rush
5/4	Colorado Apex	23	19	Seattle Cascades
5/4	Detroit Mechanix	9	24	Chicago Union
5/5	Philadelphia Phoenix	10	22	DC Breeze

New York's loss was their first regular-season loss since Week 8 of the 2021 season, which also came against Atlanta, and their first loss of any kind since the 2021 AUDL final against Carolina (then Raleigh).

=== Week 3 ===
Date	Home	Goals	Goals	Away
5/10	Oregon Steel	20	21	Oakland Spiders
5/10	DC Breeze	12	11	Boston Glory
5/11	Chicago Union	14	16	Minnesota Wind Chill
5/11	Toronto Rush	12	15	Montreal Royal
5/11	Indianapolis AlleyCats	25	16	Detroit Mechanix
5/11	Carolina Flyers	22	19	Atlanta Hustle
5/11	Dallas Legion	17	25	Austin Sol
5/11	Philadelphia Phoenix	10	19	Boston Glory
5/11	Pittsburgh Thunderbirds	14	23	Madison Radicals
5/11	Seattle Cascades	21	22	Oakland Spiders

=== Week 4 ===
Date	Home	Goals	Goals	Away
5/17	Boston Glory	15	17	New York Empire
5/17	San Diego Growlers	24	17	Oregon Steel
5/17	Oakland Spiders	19	25	Salt Lake Shred
5/18	Detroit Mechanix	10	27	Madison Radicals
5/18	DC Breeze	24	23	Philadelphia Phoenix
5/18	Colorado Apex	15	20	Salt Lake Shred
5/18	Indianapolis AlleyCats	18	25	Atlanta Hustle
5/18	Dallas Legion	17	18	Houston Havoc
5/18	Montreal Royal	16	18	New York Empire
5/18	Minnesota Wind Chill	15	16	Pittsburgh Thunderbirds
5/18	Los Angeles Aviators	18	13	Oregon Steel

=== Week 5 ===
Date	Home	Goals	Goals	Away
5/24	Houston Havoc	14	20	Chicago Union
5/24	Pittsburgh Thunderbirds	27	18	Detroit Mechanix
5/24	Madison Radicals	17	21	Minnesota Wind Chill
5/24	New York Empire	23	15	Philadelphia Phoenix
5/25	Austin Sol	13	14	Chicago Union
5/25	Toronto Rush	21	13	Pittsburgh Thunderbirds
5/25	Salt Lake Shred	23	20	San Diego Growlers
5/25	Seattle Cascades	24	15	Oregon Steel

=== Week 6 ===
Date	Home	Goals	Goals	Away
5/31	Colorado Apex	16	18	Atlanta Hustle
5/31	New York Empire	14	16	Boston Glory
5/31	Austin Sol	17	20	Carolina Flyers
5/31	Chicago Union	20	19	Madison Radicals
5/31	DC Breeze	26	19	Toronto Rush
6/1	Houston Havoc	15	25	Austin Sol
6/1	Indianapolis AlleyCats	21	20	Chicago Union
6/1	San Diego Growlers	17	18	Seattle Cascades
6/1	Dallas Legion	14	21	Carolina Flyers
6/1	Philadelphia Phoenix	18	16	Toronto Rush
6/2	Madison Radicals	28	20	Detroit Mechanix
6/2	Pittsburgh Thunderbirds	26	18	Indianapolis AlleyCats
6/2	Boston Glory	16	15	DC Breeze
6/2	Los Angeles Aviators	19	20	Seattle Cascades

=== Week 7 ===
Date	Home	Goals	Goals	Away
6/7	Atlanta Hustle	23	16	Austin Sol
6/7	Seattle Cascades	27	16	Los Angeles Aviators
6/7	Oakland Spiders	18	17	Colorado Apex
6/8	Salt Lake Shred	19	20	Colorado Apex
6/8	Detroit Mechanix	12	19	Madison Radicals
6/8	DC Breeze	16	14	New York Empire
6/8	Boston Glory	22	12	Philadelphia Phoenix
6/8	Montreal Royal	22	20	Toronto Rush
6/8	Indianapolis AlleyCats	21	24	Minnesota Wind Chill
6/8	Carolina Flyers	26	19	Austin Sol
6/8	Dallas Legion	20	22	Houston Havoc
6/8	Oregon Steel	22	21	Los Angeles Aviators

=== Week 8 ===
Date	Home	Goals	Goals	Away
6/14	Atlanta Hustle	27	13	Houston Havoc
6/14	Madison Radicals	24	22	Colorado Apex
6/14	Chicago Union	12	17	Pittsburgh Thunderbirds
6/15	Austin Sol	23	20	Dallas Legion
6/15	Toronto Rush	15	23	DC Breeze
6/15	Indianapolis AlleyCats	32	20	Detroit Mechanix
6/15	San Diego Growlers	24	15	Los Angeles Aviators
6/15	Minnesota Wind Chill	20	17	Colorado Apex
6/15	Carolina Flyers	25	16	Houston Havoc
6/15	Philadelphia Phoenix	20	21	New York Empire
6/15	Oregon Steel	13	24	Seattle Cascades
6/16	Montreal Royal	20	21	DC Breeze

=== Week 9 ===
Date	Home	Goals	Goals	Away
6/21	Colorado Apex	26	22	San Diego Growlers
6/21	New York Empire	29	18	Toronto Rush
6/21	Dallas Legion	21	26	Austin Sol
6/21	Salt Lake Shred	23	19	Los Angeles Aviators
6/21	Philadelphia Phoenix	21	10	Montreal Royal
6/22	Atlanta Hustle	25	19	Carolina Flyers
6/22	Houston Havoc	21	18	Dallas Legion
6/22	DC Breeze	24	16	Montreal Royal
6/22	Detroit Mechanix	25	14	Pittsburgh Thunderbirds
6/22	Boston Glory	20	14	Toronto Rush
6/22	Chicago Union	19	14	Indianapolis AlleyCats
6/22	Minnesota Wind Chill	22	17	Madison Radicals
6/22	Oakland Spiders	22	19	San Diego Growlers

=== Week 10 ===
Date	Home	Goals	Goals	Away
6/28	Houston Havoc	12	27	Atlanta Hustle
6/28	DC Breeze	25	13	Carolina Flyers
6/28	Chicago Union	16	17	Minnesota Wind Chill
6/29	Austin Sol	19	23	Atlanta Hustle
6/29	Detroit Mechanix	15	31	Minnesota Wind Chill
6/29	Toronto Rush	16	20	Philadelphia Phoenix
6/29	Indianapolis AlleyCats	23	22	Madison Radicals
6/29	San Diego Growlers	20	16	Oakland Spiders
6/29	Pittsburgh Thunderbirds	14	23	Carolina Flyers
6/29	Seattle Cascades	20	19	Colorado Apex
6/29	New York Empire	25	14	Salt Lake Shred
6/30	Oregon Steel	15	25	Colorado Apex
6/30	Montreal Royal	18	23	Philadelphia Phoenix
6/30	Los Angeles Aviators	19	17	Oakland Spiders

=== Week 11 ===
Date	Home	Goals	Goals	Away
7/5	Houston Havoc	15	14	Dallas Legion
7/5	Salt Lake Shred	28	17	Oregon Steel
7/6	Austin Sol	28	18	Houston Havoc
7/6	Colorado Apex	18	16	Indianapolis AlleyCats
7/6	Minnesota Wind Chill	20	25	Chicago Union
7/6	Carolina Flyers	24	19	Philadelphia Phoenix
7/6	Madison Radicals	21	20	Pittsburgh Thunderbirds
7/6	Oakland Spiders	26	17	Oregon Steel
7/6	Montreal Royal	20	21	Boston Glory
7/7	Los Angeles Aviators	25	24	San Diego Growlers

=== Week 12 ===
Date	Home	Goals	Goals	Away
7/12	Madison Radicals	21	13	Chicago Union
7/12	Carolina Flyers	25	12	Dallas Legion
7/12	Colorado Apex	26	16	Los Angeles Aviators
7/12	Minnesota Wind Chill	16	25	New York Empire
7/13	Atlanta Hustle	19	18	Dallas Legion
7/13	Detroit Mechanix	14	20	Indianapolis AlleyCats
7/13	Oregon Steel	20	24	Salt Lake Shred
7/14	Pittsburgh Thunderbirds	20	21	Indianapolis AlleyCats

=== Week 13 ===
Date	Home	Goals	Goals	Away
7/19	Madison Radicals	25	16	Indianapolis AlleyCats
7/19	Toronto Rush	18	23	Montreal Royal
7/19	Salt Lake Shred	18	16	Seattle Cascades
7/20	Atlanta Hustle	19	16	Carolina Flyers
7/20	Toronto Rush	21	26	Boston Glory
7/20	San Diego Growlers	22	26	Oakland Spiders
7/20	Dallas Legion	18	28	Austin Sol
7/20	New York Empire	20	24	DC Breeze
7/20	Minnesota Wind Chill	30	16	Detroit Mechanix
7/20	Philadelphia Phoenix	18	17	Pittsburgh Thunderbirds
7/21	Seattle Cascades	26	17	Oregon Steel
7/21	Chicago Union	24	14	Detroit Mechanix
7/21	Montreal Royal	18	14	Boston Glory
7/21	Los Angeles Aviators	16	23	Oakland Spiders

== Standings ==
Since the teams did not all play the same number of games, the divisions were ranked based on percentage of games won.

=== East ===
Team	W	L	%	GD	Qualification
DC Breeze	10	2	0.833	+52	First round bye
Boston Glory	10	3	0.769	+38	Playoffs
New York Empire	8	5	0.615	+32	Playoffs
Philadelphia Phoenix	5	7	0.417	-23	
Montreal Royal	4	8	0.333	-18	
Toronto Rush	1	11	0.083	-53	

=== Central ===
Team	W	L	%	GD	Qualification
Minnesota Wind Chill	9	3	0.750	+40	First round bye
Madison Radicals	9	4	0.692	+51	Playoffs
Chicago Union	7	6	0.538	+25	Playoffs
Indianapolis AlleyCats	6	6	0.500	-4	
Pittsburgh Thunderbirds	4	8	0.333	-24	
Detroit Mechanix	1	11	0.083	-112	

=== South ===
Team	W	L	%	GD	Qualification
Atlanta Hustle	10	2	0.833	+53	First round bye
Carolina Flyers	10	3	0.769	+51	Playoffs
Austin Sol	7	6	0.538	+27	Playoffs
Houston Havoc	5	7	0.417	-63	
Dallas Legion	0	12	0.000	-59	

=== West ===
Team	W	L	%	GD	Qualification
Salt Lake Shred	10	2	0.833	+31	First round bye
Seattle Cascades	10	3	0.769	+55	Playoffs
Oakland Spiders	8	5	0.615	+12	Playoffs
Colorado Summit	6	6	0.500	+17	
San Diego Growlers	4	8	0.333	-5	
Los Angeles Aviators	3	9	0.250	-41	
Portland Nitro	1	11	0.083	-82	

== Postseason ==
The first round of the playoffs, with games hosted by the #2 seed in each division, was contested the weekend of 27–28 July. The Division Championship games were hosted by the #1 seed and played on the weekend of 9–10 August. Championship Weekend, where the semi-final and finals were played, was held in Herriman, Utah at Zions Bank Stadium on the weekend of 23–24 August.

First Round; 27–28 July
2	Madison Radicals (2OT)	18
3	Chicago Union	17
2	Boston Glory	19
3	New York Empire	18
2	Carolina Flyers	26
3	Austin Sol	18
2	Seattle Cascades	23
3	Oakland Spiders	19

Division Championships; 9–10 August
1	Minnesota Wind Chill	23
2	Madison Radicals	14
1	DC Breeze	16
2	Boston Glory	14
1	Atlanta Hustle	16
2	Carolina Flyers	17
1	Salt Lake Shred	20
2	Seattle Cascades	21

Semi-Finals; 23 August
Minnesota Wind Chill	16
DC Breeze	13
Carolina Flyers	20
Seattle Cascades	16

Final; 24 August
Minnesota Wind Chill	17
Carolina Flyers	16

== Season Awards ==
- Most Valuable Player: Jeff Babbitt (BOS)
- Defensive Player of the Year: Lukas Ambrose (SEA)
- Rookie of the Year: Tobe Decraene (MTL)
- Most Improved Player: Gordon Larson (MIN)
- Coach of the Year: Ben Feldman (MIN)

=== Individual Leaders ===
- Assists: 60, Jake Felton (DET)
- Goals: 60, Alec Wilson Holliday (DAL)
- Blocks: 34, Lukas Ambrose (SEA)
- Scores (Goals + Assists): 85, Jake Felton (DET)
- Receiving Yards: 4,356, Alec Wilson Holliday (DAL)
- Throwing Yards: 6,214, Evan Magsig (OAK)
- Total Yards: 7,347, Jake Felton (DET)
- Completions: 680, Evan Magsig (OAK)
- Points Played: 326, Elijah Long (CAR)

=== All-UFA Teams ===
First Team

- Lukas Ambrose (SEA)
- Alex Atkins (COL)
- Jeff Babbitt (BOS)
- Brett Hulsmeyer (ATL)
- Anders Juengst (CAR)
- Allan Laviolette (CAR)
- Jack Williams (NY)

Second Team

- Tobe Decraene (MTL)
- Travis Dunn (SD)
- Anthony Gutowsky (MAD)
- Cole Jurek (DC)
- Garrett Martin (SEA)
- Austin Taylor (ATL)
- Bryan Vohnoutka (MIN)

Third Team

- Will Brandt (MIN)
- Jacob Fairfax (CAR)
- Henry Fisher (CAR)
- Ben Jagt (NY)
- Jeremy Langdon (ATL)
- Evan Magsig (OAK)
- Alec Wilson Holliday (DAL)

=== All-Rookie Teams ===
First Team

- Nate Astrom (CHI)
- Christian Belus (CAR)
- Elliot Bonnet (DC)
- Tobe Decraene (MTL)
- Pieran Robert (MAD)
- Leo Sovell-Fernandez (MIN)
- Aaron Wolf (SEA)

Second Team

- Jasper Dean (SEA)
- Jake Felton (DET)
- Nanda Min-Fink (COL)
- Jonah Stang-Osborne (BOS)
- Zeke Thoreson (COL)
- Gabe Vordick (MAD)
- John Wellers (CAR)

=== All-Defense Teams ===
First Team

- Lukas Ambrose (SEA)
- Henry Fisher (CAR)
- Sterling Knoche (MAD)
- Cameron Lacy (MIN)
- Lukas McClamrock (ATL)
- Jake Rubin-Miller (CHI)
- Chad Yorgason (SLC)

Second Team

- Nate Astrom (CHI)
- David Bloodgood (DC)
- Justin Burnett (ATL)
- Antoine Davis (NY)
- Brandon Matis (MIN)
- Mitchell McCarthy (MAD)
- Jasper Tom (DC)
