= 2022 American Ultimate Disc League season =

- League: American Ultimate Disc League
- Sport: Ultimate
- Duration: April 29 – August 27, 2022
- Teams: 25

Regular season
- Season MVP: Ryan Osgar (NY)

Postseason
- Central Division champions: Chicago Union
- East Division champions: New York Empire
- South Division champions: Carolina Flyers
- West Division champions: Colorado Summit
- Postseason MVP: Jack Williams (NY)

Finals
- Champions: New York Empire (2)
- Runners-up: Salt Lake Shred

UFA seasons
- ← 2021 2023 →

The 2022 American Ultimate Disc League season was the league's tenth. The New York Empire won their second championship after an undefeated season, becoming only the second franchise to win multiple championships. New York's Ryan Osgar won the league's MVP award, and Jack Williams won the Championship Weekend MVP.

== Preseason ==
After the divisional realignment caused by COVID-related travel restrictions during the 2021 season, teams were restored to their previous divisions for 2022. The Atlantic division was split into the former East and South divisions, the Canadian teams rejoined the East, Pittsburgh moved back to the Central, and Dallas and Austin returned to the South division. The Dallas franchise rebranded from the Roughnecks to the Legion, the San Jose Spiders moved to Oakland, and the Raleigh Flyers became the Carolina Flyers. Finally, three new West Division teams joined the league in 2022: the Colorado Summit, Portland Steel, and Salt Lake Shred.

== Regular Season ==
=== Week 1 ===
| Date | Home | Goals | Goals | Away |
|---|---|---|---|---|
| 4/29 | Carolina Flyers | 16 | 14 | Atlanta Hustle |
| 4/29 | San Diego Growlers | 22 | 24 | Salt Lake Shred |
| 4/30 | Atlanta Hustle | 24 | 12 | Tampa Bay Cannons |
| 4/30 | Boston Glory | 25 | 24 | Philadelphia Phoenix |
| 4/30 | DC Breeze | 19 | 22 | New York Empire |
| 4/30 | Toronto Rush | 19 | 26 | Montreal Royal |
| 4/30 | Detroit Mechanix | 13 | 17 | Pittsburgh Thunderbirds |
| 4/30 | Dallas Legion | 17 | 20 | Austin Sol |
| 4/30 | Los Angeles Aviators | 22 | 25 | Salt Lake Shred |
| 5/1 | Portland Steel | 29 | 24 | Seattle Cascades |
| 5/1 | Chicago Union | 19 | 8 | Pittsburgh Thunderbirds |

=== Week 2 ===
| Date | Home | Goals | Goals | Away |
|---|---|---|---|---|
| 5/6 | Ottawa Outlaws | 21 | 19 | Boston Glory |
| 5/7 | Indianapolis AlleyCats | 33 | 22 | Detroit Mechanix |
| 5/7 | New York Empire | 17 | 15 | Philadelphia Phoenix |
| 5/7 | Madison Radicals | 18 | 16 | Pittsburgh Thunderbirds |
| 5/7 | Minnesota Wind Chill | 21 | 24 | Chicago Union |
| 5/7 | Tampa Bay Cannons | 13 | 19 | Carolina Flyers |
| 5/7 | Oakland Spiders | 16 | 18 | San Diego Growlers |
| 5/7 | Seattle Cascades | 16 | 19 | Colorado Apex |
| 5/7 | Montreal Royal | 21 | 17 | Boston Glory |
| 5/8 | Portland Steel | 23 | 24 | Colorado Apex |

=== Week 3 ===
| Date | Home | Goals | Goals | Away |
|---|---|---|---|---|
| 5/13 | Philadelphia Phoenix | 17 | 18 | Montreal Royal |
| 5/13 | Austin Sol | 24 | 17 | Dallas Legion |
| 5/13 | Salt Lake Shred | 32 | 21 | Seattle Cascades |
| 5/14 | Indianapolis AlleyCats | 22 | 23 | Madison Radicals |
| 5/14 | Boston Glory | 19 | 23 | New York Empire |
| 5/14 | DC Breeze | 27 | 17 | Montreal Royal |
| 5/14 | Toronto Rush | 29 | 26 | Ottawa Outlaws |
| 5/14 | Dallas Legion | 14 | 20 | Minnesota Wind Chill |
| 5/14 | Carolina Flyers | 24 | 18 | Tampa Bay Cannons |
| 5/14 | San Diego Growlers | 22 | 17 | Los Angeles Aviators |

=== Week 4 ===
| Date | Home | Goals | Goals | Away |
|---|---|---|---|---|
| 5/20 | Montreal Royal | 13 | 19 | Philadelphia Phoenix |
| 5/20 | Boston Glory | 23 | 13 | Toronto Rush |
| 5/20 | Carolina Flyers | 27 | 24 | Austin Sol |
| 5/21 | Atlanta Hustle | 26 | 21 | Austin Sol |
| 5/21 | New York Empire | 31 | 17 | Toronto Rush |
| 5/21 | Ottawa Outlaws | 22 | 23 | Philadelphia Phoenix |
| 5/21 | Detroit Mechanix | 18 | 27 | Madison Radicals |
| 5/21 | Pittsburgh Thunderbirds | 16 | 20 | Indianapolis AlleyCats |
| 5/21 | Oakland Spiders | 22 | 26 | Portland Steel |
| 5/21 | San Diego Growlers | 22 | 20 | Seattle Cascades |
| 5/22 | Los Angeles Aviators | 19 | 18 | Seattle Cascades |

=== Week 5 ===
| Date | Home | Goals | Goals | Away |
|---|---|---|---|---|
| 5/27 | Montreal Royal | 18 | 22 | New York Empire |
| 5/28 | Ottawa Outlaws | 18 | 30 | New York Empire |
| 5/28 | Toronto Rush | 26 | 27 | DC Breeze |
| 5/28 | Detroit Mechanix | 19 | 23 | Indianapolis AlleyCats |
| 5/28 | Madison Radicals | 16 | 19 | Minnesota Wind Chill |
| 5/28 | Tampa Bay Cannons | 19 | 24 | Pittsburgh Thunderbirds |
| 5/28 | Colorado Apex | 21 | 20 | Salt Lake Shred |
| 5/28 | Seattle Cascades | 26 | 18 | Portland Steel |

=== Week 6 ===
| Date | Home | Goals | Goals | Away |
|---|---|---|---|---|
| 6/1 | Ottawa Outlaws | 21 | 24 | Montreal Royal |
| 6/3 | DC Breeze | 25 | 20 | Boston Glory |
| 6/3 | Pittsburgh Thunderbirds | 19 | 20 | Madison Radicals |
| 6/3 | Dallas Legion | 18 | 26 | Carolina Flyers |
| 6/3 | Salt Lake Shred | 30 | 21 | Oakland Spiders |
| 6/4 | Toronto Rush | 8 | 25 | New York Empire |
| 6/4 | Detroit Mechanix | 20 | 28 | Chicago Union |
| 6/4 | Austin Sol | 21 | 20 | Carolina Flyers |
| 6/4 | Colorado Apex | 22 | 16 | Oakland Spiders |
| 6/4 | Philadelphia Phoenix | 24 | 22 | Boston Glory |
| 6/4 | Minnesota Wind Chill | 28 | 13 | Indianapolis AlleyCats |
| 6/4 | Tampa Bay Cannons | 16 | 18 | Atlanta Hustle |
| 6/4 | Portland Steel | 20 | 21 | Los Angeles Aviators |
| 6/5 | Seattle Cascades | 23 | 14 | Los Angeles Aviators |

=== Week 7 ===
| Date | Home | Goals | Goals | Away |
|---|---|---|---|---|
| 6/10 | Los Angeles Aviators | 17 | 16 | Portland Steel |
| 6/10 | New York Empire | 25 | 21 | DC Breeze |
| 6/10 | Salt Lake Shred | 20 | 25 | Colorado Apex |
| 6/10 | Chicago Union | 22 | 21 | Madison Radicals |
| 6/11 | Indianapolis AlleyCats | 32 | 18 | Detroit Mechanix |
| 6/11 | Montreal Royal | 20 | 21 | Toronto Rush |
| 6/11 | Minnesota Wind Chill | 20 | 14 | Pittsburgh Thunderbirds |
| 6/11 | Carolina Flyers | 23 | 15 | Dallas Legion |
| 6/11 | Oakland Spiders | 24 | 29 | Colorado Apex |
| 6/11 | San Diego Growlers | 20 | 18 | Portland Steel |
| 6/11 | Atlanta Hustle | 23 | 18 | Tampa Bay Cannons |

=== Week 8 ===
| Date | Home | Goals | Goals | Away |
|---|---|---|---|---|
| 6/17 | Atlanta Hustle | 18 | 22 | Carolina Flyers |
| 6/17 | Boston Glory | 19 | 18 | Ottawa Outlaws |
| 6/17 | Philadelphia Phoenix | 18 | 14 | Toronto Rush |
| 6/17 | Oakland Spiders | 20 | 19 | Seattle Cascades |
| 6/17 | Chicago Union | 24 | 21 | Austin Sol |
| 6/18 | DC Breeze | 26 | 16 | Toronto Rush |
| 6/18 | New York Empire | 21 | 15 | Ottawa Outlaws |
| 6/18 | Madison Radicals | 18 | 19 | Austin Sol |
| 6/18 | Pittsburgh Thunderbirds | 24 | 21 | Detroit Mechanix |
| 6/18 | Los Angeles Aviators | 19 | 20 | San Diego Growlers |
| 6/18 | Colorado Apex | 22 | 14 | Seattle Cascades |

=== Week 9 ===
| Date | Home | Goals | Goals | Away |
|---|---|---|---|---|
| 6/24 | Salt Lake Shred | 23 | 18 | San Diego Growlers |
| 6/25 | Indianapolis AlleyCats | 23 | 24 | Chicago Union |
| 6/25 | Toronto Rush | 25 | 23 | Boston Glory |
| 6/25 | Austin Sol | 26 | 20 | Dallas Legion |
| 6/25 | Colorado Apex | 27 | 21 | San Diego Growlers |
| 6/25 | Minnesota Wind Chill | 22 | 11 | Madison Radicals |
| 6/25 | Tampa Bay Cannons | 15 | 23 | Carolina Flyers |
| 6/25 | Seattle Cascades | 17 | 22 | Oakland Spiders |
| 6/26 | Portland Steel | 21 | 36 | Oakland Spiders |

=== Week 10 ===
| Date | Home | Goals | Goals | Away |
|---|---|---|---|---|
| 7/1 | New York Empire | 29 | 14 | Montreal Royal |
| 7/1 | Chicago Union | 22 | 25 | Minnesota Wind Chill |
| 7/2 | Indianapolis AlleyCats | 28 | 26 | Pittsburgh Thunderbirds |
| 7/2 | Boston Glory | 23 | 16 | Montreal Royal |
| 7/2 | Ottawa Outlaws | 20 | 21 | Toronto Rush |
| 7/2 | Carolina Flyers | 18 | 16 | Atlanta Hustle |
| 7/2 | Dallas Legion | 16 | 26 | Austin Sol |
| 7/2 | Colorado Apex | 24 | 15 | Los Angeles Aviators |
| 7/2 | Philadelphia Phoenix | 21 | 22 | DC Breeze |
| 7/2 | Detroit Mechanix | 19 | 33 | Minnesota Wind Chill |

=== Week 11 ===
| Date | Home | Goals | Goals | Away |
|---|---|---|---|---|
| 7/7 | Montreal Royal | 20 | 23 | Ottawa Outlaws |
| 7/8 | DC Breeze | 25 | 24 | Philadelphia Phoenix |
| 7/8 | Dallas Legion | 14 | 17 | Atlanta Hustle |
| 7/8 | Seattle Cascades | 24 | 25 | Salt Lake Shred |
| 7/9 | New York Empire | 32 | 18 | Boston Glory |
| 7/9 | Austin Sol | 18 | 17 | Atlanta Hustle |
| 7/9 | Portland Steel | 14 | 28 | Salt Lake Shred |
| 7/9 | Chicago Union | 23 | 15 | Indianapolis AlleyCats |
| 7/9 | Pittsburgh Thunderbirds | 22 | 19 | Detroit Mechanix |
| 7/9 | Carolina Flyers | 20 | 11 | Tampa Bay Cannons |
| 7/10 | Madison Radicals | 21 | 18 | Minnesota Wind Chill |

=== Week 12 ===
| Date | Home | Goals | Goals | Away |
|---|---|---|---|---|
| 7/15 | Montreal Royal | 14 | 24 | DC Breeze |
| 7/15 | Madison Radicals | 17 | 19 | Indianapolis AlleyCats |
| 7/15 | San Diego Growlers | 23 | 20 | Colorado Apex |
| 7/16 | Ottawa Outlaws | 17 | 24 | DC Breeze |
| 7/16 | Toronto Rush | 23 | 25 | Philadelphia Phoenix |
| 7/16 | Detroit Mechanix | 18 | 25 | Madison Radicals |
| 7/16 | Austin Sol | 26 | 22 | Dallas Legion |
| 7/16 | Minnesota Wind Chill | 25 | 27 | Chicago Union |
| 7/16 | Pittsburgh Thunderbirds | 22 | 27 | Carolina Flyers |
| 7/16 | Tampa Bay Cannons | 17 | 26 | Atlanta Hustle |
| 7/16 | Los Angeles Aviators | 21 | 27 | Colorado Apex |
| 7/16 | Oakland Spiders | 19 | 22 | Salt Lake Shred |

=== Week 13 ===
| Date | Home | Goals | Goals | Away |
|---|---|---|---|---|
| 7/22 | Atlanta Hustle | 27 | 20 | Dallas Legion |
| 7/22 | Philadelphia Phoenix | 19 | 24 | New York Empire |
| 7/22 | Salt Lake Shred | 19 | 16 | Los Angeles Aviators |
| 7/23 | Pittsburgh Thunderbirds | 17 | 25 | Chicago Union |
| 7/23 | Tampa Bay Cannons | 17 | 15 | Dallas Legion |
| 7/23 | Oakland Spiders | 22 | 18 | Los Angeles Aviators |
| 7/23 | Seattle Cascades | 18 | 22 | San Diego Growlers |
| 7/23 | Indianapolis AlleyCats | 21 | 24 | Minnesota Wind Chill |
| 7/23 | Boston Glory | 21 | 23 | DC Breeze |
| 7/24 | Portland Steel | 18 | 23 | San Diego Growlers |

=== Week 14 ===
| Date | Home | Goals | Goals | Away |
|---|---|---|---|---|
| 7/29 | Los Angeles Aviators | 25 | 24 | Oakland Spiders |
| 7/29 | DC Breeze | 24 | 17 | Ottawa Outlaws |
| 7/29 | Madison Radicals | 15 | 21 | Chicago Union |
| 7/29 | Austin Sol | 30 | 10 | Tampa Bay Cannons |
| 7/29 | Salt Lake Shred | 32 | 16 | Portland Steel |
| 7/30 | Atlanta Hustle | 23 | 21 | Indianapolis AlleyCats |
| 7/30 | Dallas Legion | 24 | 16 | Tampa Bay Cannons |
| 7/30 | Colorado Apex | 34 | 18 | Portland Steel |
| 7/30 | Philadelphia Phoenix | 25 | 19 | Ottawa Outlaws |
| 7/30 | Chicago Union | 33 | 18 | Detroit Mechanix |
| 7/30 | San Diego Growlers | 24 | 18 | Oakland Spiders |
| 7/31 | Minnesota Wind Chill | 28 | 9 | Detroit Mechanix |

== Standings ==
The South division, having fewer teams, was given two playoff berths; the division championship was contested between the top two teams in the division. In the other three divisions, the top seed received a bye to the second round, while the second and third seeds played each other in the first round.

=== East ===
| Team | W | L | % | GD | Qualification |
|---|---|---|---|---|---|
| New York Empire | 12 | 0 | 1.000 | +100 | First round bye |
| DC Breeze | 10 | 2 | 0.833 | +47 | Playoffs |
| Philadelphia Phoenix | 6 | 6 | 0.500 | +10 | Playoffs |
| Boston Glory | 4 | 8 | 0.333 | -16 | |
| Montreal Royal | 4 | 8 | 0.333 | -41 | |
| Toronto Rush | 4 | 8 | 0.333 | -58 | |
| Ottawa Outlaws | 2 | 10 | 0.167 | -42 | |

=== South ===
| Team | W | L | % | GD | Qualification |
|---|---|---|---|---|---|
| Carolina Flyers | 11 | 1 | 0.917 | +60 | Playoffs |
| Austin Sol | 9 | 3 | 0.750 | +42 | Playoffs |
| Atlanta Hustle | 8 | 4 | 0.667 | +36 | |
| Dallas Legion | 1 | 11 | 0.083 | -56 | |
| Tampa Bay Cannons | 1 | 11 | 0.083 | -88 | |

=== Central ===
| Team | W | L | % | GD | Qualification |
|---|---|---|---|---|---|
| Chicago Union | 11 | 1 | 0.917 | +63 | First round bye |
| Minnesota Wind Chill | 9 | 3 | 0.750 | +72 | Playoffs |
| Indianapolis AlleyCats | 6 | 6 | 0.500 | +7 | Playoffs |
| Madison Radicals | 6 | 6 | 0.500 | -1 | |
| Pittsburgh Thunderbirds | 4 | 8 | 0.333 | -24 | |
| Detroit Mechanix | 0 | 12 | 0.000 | -111 | |

=== West ===
| Team | W | L | % | GD | Qualification |
|---|---|---|---|---|---|
| Colorado Summit | 11 | 1 | 0.917 | +63 | First round bye |
| Salt Lake Shred | 10 | 2 | 0.833 | +61 | Playoffs |
| San Diego Growlers | 9 | 3 | 0.750 | +17 | Playoffs |
| Oakland Spiders | 4 | 8 | 0.333 | -11 | |
| Los Angeles Aviators | 4 | 8 | 0.333 | -36 | |
| Seattle Cascades | 2 | 10 | 0.167 | -24 | |
| Portland Steel | 2 | 10 | 0.167 | -70 | |

== Postseason ==
First Round
2 | DC Breeze | 23
3 | Philadelphia Phoenix | 18
2 | Minnesota Wind Chill | 20
3 | Indianapolis AlleyCats | 18
2 | Salt Lake Shred | 19
3 | San Diego Growlers | 16

Division Championships
1 | New York Empire | 19
2 | DC Breeze | 18
1 | Carolina Flyers | 22
2 | Austin Sol | 20
1 | Chicago Union | 21
2 | Minnesota Wind Chill | 16
1 | Colorado Summit | 26
2 | Salt Lake Shred | 21

Semi-Finals
New York Empire | 22
Carolina Flyers | 16
Chicago Union | 19
Colorado Summit | 14

Final
New York Empire | 22
Chicago Union | 14

== Season Awards ==
- Most Valuable Player: Ryan Osgar (NY)
- Defensive Player of the Year: Cody Spicer (COL)
- Rookie of the Year: Leandro Marx (POR)
- Most Improved Player: James Pollard (PHI)
- Coach of the Year: Steven Naji (ATX)

=== Individual Leaders ===
- Assists: 90, Jordan Kerr (SLC)
- Goals: 59, Cameron Brock (IND)
- Blocks: 24, Phil Turner (TOR)
- Scores: 121, Jordan Kerr (SLC)
- Receiving Yards: 5315, Leandro Marx (POR)
- Throwing Yards: 5980, Jonathan Nethercutt (COL)
- Total Yards: 8218, Pawel Janas (CHI)
- Completions: 741, Pawel Janas (CHI)
- Points Played: 374, Leandro Marx (POR)

=== All-AUDL Teams ===
First Team

- Ben Jagt (NY)
- Pawel Janas (CHI)
- Jordan Kerr (SLC)
- Rowan McDonnell (DC)
- Jonathan Nethercutt (COL)
- Ryan Osgar (NY)
- Jack Williams (NY)

Second Team

- Jeff Babbitt (NY)
- Travis Dunn (SD)
- Quinn Finer (COL)
- Kyle Henke (ATX)
- Leandro Marx (POR)
- Cody Spicer (COL)
- Eric Taylor (CAR)

=== All-Rookie Teams ===
First Team

- Mark Evans (ATX)
- Quinn Finer (COL)
- Leandro Marx (POR)
- Jake Radack (ATX)
- Kyle Rutledge (CHI)
- Cody Spicer (COL)
- Chad Yorgason (SLC)

Second Team

- Mathieu Agee (COL)
- Alex Atkins (COL)
- Asher Lantz (CHI)
- Declan Miller (SEA)
- Oscar Stonehouse (TOR)
- Alex Tatum (COL)
- Luke Yorgason (SLC)

=== All-Defense Team ===
- Marques Brownlee (NY)
- Joel Clutton (SLC)
- Abe Coffin (MIN)
- Paul Owens (PHL)
- Cody Spicer (COL)
- Phil Turner (TOR)
- Chad Yorgason (SLC)
