= 2026 Ultimate Frisbee Association season =

- League: Ultimate Frisbee Association
- Sport: Ultimate
- Duration: April 24 – August 28, 2026
- Teams: 22

Regular season
- Season MVP: Tobe Decraene (BOS) (2)

Postseason
- East Division champions: New York Empire
- Central Division champions: Minnesota Wild Chill
- West Division champions: Oakland Spiders
- South Division champions: Austin Sol

Finals
- Champions: Oakland Spiders (3)
- Runners-up: Minnesota Wild Chill
- Finals MVP: Walker Frankenberg (OAK)

UFA seasons
- ← 2025 2027 →

The 2026 Ultimate Frisbee Association season was the league's fourteenth and third since rebranding as the UFA. It began on April 24, 2026 and culminated in Championship Weekend at Breese Stevens Field in Madison, Wisconsin on August 27–28, 2026. The Oakland Spiders won the championship, defeating the Minnesota Wind Chill. Oakland's win was their third, including two victories as the San Jose Spiders in 2014 and 2015, becoming the second team in league history to win three championships. Minnesota lost their second final in a row after winning the title in 2024. Oakland's Walker Frankenberg took home Championship Weekend MVP honors, while Boston's Tobe Decraene won the league MVP award for the second year in a row.

Games were broadcast on the league's streaming platform, WatchUFA.tv, with one game per week broadcast for free on YouTube as part of the "Friday Night Frisbee" program.

== Preseason ==
Following the 2025 season, the Los Angeles Aviators and the Detroit Mechanix ceased operations and left the league. Detroit's departure left the Indianapolis AlleyCats as the only active franchise that has been with the league since the founding of the AUDL in 2012. The divisions were rebalanced, with the Vegas Bighorns moving from the West to the South division. The Colorado Summit rebranded as the Colorado Apex after giving up their former name to a new NWSL team in Denver.

A larger-than-usual number of coaching positions turned over during the offseason:

- Austin replaced Steven Naji with Casey Hogg, a former player, and Joe Iannacone.
- Chicago's Dave Woods stepped down, leaving his co-coach Charlie Furse alone in charge
- Joe Durst took over in Colorado, with team executive Tim Kefalas stepping back into an assistant position.
- DC's Lauren Boyle left by mutual consent; she was replaced by Xavier Maxstadt, an assistant coach with the Breeze for several years.
- Bex Forth, head coach in Houston since their 2023 debut, announced she would not be returning; Sean McCall was appointed for the 2026 season.
- Indianapolis fired Drew Shepherd and appointed Nathan Bussburg in his place.
- Max Browski left Pittsburgh by mutual consent after four years, replaced by David Berg, Browski's assistant and a former player.
- In Philadelphia, Adam Callaghan replaced David Brandolph, becoming the Phoenix's third head coach in three seasons.
- Oakland's Caleb Merriam stepped down for personal reasons; Liam Kreiss takes his place behind the bench.
- Vegas lost their head coach Matt Bode near the beginning of the 2025 season, leaving assistant coach Dan Silverstein in charge; Ryan Courtney takes over for 2026.

== Rule changes ==
The following rule changes went into effect for the 2026 season:

- If the defense commits a foul in the last five seconds of a quarter, they are no longer allowed to set a double-team on the thrower during the restart.
- If a defensive foul is called in the end zone but a goal is still scored, a 10-yard penalty will be added to the ensuing pull.
- A "team technical" foul (and 20-yard penalty) can be assessed on the head coach if the referees determine that there is a pattern of "behavior detrimental to the game" across an entire team, rather than any individual player.
- Officials have been directed to apply a zero-tolerance policy on jersey tugging; one-game suspensions will be awarded on any incident, including those found through post-game video review.

== Regular season ==
=== Week 1 ===
| Date | Home | Goals | Goals | Away | OT |
|---|---|---|---|---|---|
| 4/24 | Houston Havoc | 13 | 29 | Atlanta Hustle | |
| 4/24 | San Diego Growlers | 20 | 22 | Carolina Flyers | |
| 4/25 | Austin Sol | 27 | 26 | Atlanta Hustle | 2OT |
| 4/25 | Boston Glory | 21 | 16 | DC Breeze | |
| 4/25 | Vegas Bighorns | 12 | 26 | Carolina Flyers | |
| 4/26 | Oakland Spiders | 34 | 11 | Oregon Steel | |

=== Week 2 ===
| Date | Home | Goals | Goals | Away | OT |
|---|---|---|---|---|---|
| 5/1 | New York Empire | 24 | 15 | Toronto Rush | |
| 5/1 | Salt Lake Shred | 23 | 14 | Oregon Steel | |
| 5/2 | Houston Havoc | 20 | 22 | Austin Sol | OT |
| 5/2 | Philadelphia Phoenix | 17 | 24 | Toronto Rush | |
| 5/2 | Minnesota Wind Chill | 22 | 12 | Chicago Union | |
| 5/2 | Oakland Spiders | 25 | 15 | Salt Lake Shred | |
| 5/2 | Boston Glory | 22 | 15 | Montreal Royal | |
| 5/2 | Seattle Cascades | 27 | 14 | Colorado Apex | |
| 5/3 | DC Breeze | 20 | 18 | Montreal Royal | |
| 5/3 | Oregon Steel | 18 | 20 | Colorado Apex | |

=== Week 3 ===
| Date | Home | Goals | Goals | Away | OT |
|---|---|---|---|---|---|
| 5/8 | Vegas Bighorns | 12 | 30 | Atlanta Hustle | |
| 5/9 | Carolina Flyers | 31 | 14 | Philadelphia Phoenix | |
| 5/9 | Austin Sol | 28 | 15 | Houston Havoc | |
| 5/9 | San Diego Growlers | 16 | 15 | Atlanta Hustle | |
| 5/9 | Indianapolis AlleyCats | 18 | 19 | Madison Radicals | |
| 5/9 | Toronto Rush | 18 | 17 | Montreal Royal | |
| 5/9 | Seattle Cascades | 16 | 26 | Oakland Spiders | |
| 5/9 | Colorado Apex | 16 | 26 | Salt Lake Shred | |
| 5/10 | Oregon Steel | 13 | 24 | Oakland Spiders | |
| 5/10 | Pittsburgh Thunderbirds | 24 | 32 | Montreal Royal | |
| 5/10 | New York Empire | 25 | 26 | DC Breeze | OT |

=== Week 4 ===
| Date | Home | Goals | Goals | Away | OT |
|---|---|---|---|---|---|
| 5/15 | Houston Havoc | 15 | 13 | Vegas Bighorns | |
| 5/15 | DC Breeze | 32 | 16 | Colorado Apex | |
| 5/15 | Indianapolis AlleyCats | 13 | 21 | Minnesota Wind Chill | |
| 5/15 | Pittsburgh Thunderbirds | 17 | 21 | Madison Radicals | |
| 5/16 | Atlanta Hustle | 23 | 22 | Carolina Flyers | 2OT |
| 5/16 | Austin Sol | 25 | 8 | Vegas Bighorns | |
| 5/16 | New York Empire | 31 | 14 | Colorado Apex | |
| 5/16 | Chicago Union | 15 | 20 | Minnesota Wind Chill | |
| 5/16 | Montreal Royal | 19 | 21 | Boston Glory | OT |
| 5/16 | Oregon Steel | 12 | 18 | Seattle Cascades | |
| 5/17 | Oakland Spiders | 25 | 15 | San Diego Growlers | |

=== Week 5 ===
| Date | Home | Goals | Goals | Away | OT |
|---|---|---|---|---|---|
| 5/23 | Carolina Flyers | 18 | 12 | Atlanta Hustle | |
| 5/23 | DC Breeze | 14 | 18 | New York Empire | |
| 5/23 | Vegas Bighorns | 17 | 26 | San Diego Growlers | |
| 5/23 | Montreal Royal | 16 | 21 | Toronto Rush | |
| 5/24 | Boston Glory | 28 | 11 | Philadelphia Phoenix | |

=== Week 6 ===
| Date | Home | Goals | Goals | Away | OT |
|---|---|---|---|---|---|
| 5/29 | New York Empire | 34 | 11 | Pittsburgh Thunderbirds | |
| 5/29 | Colorado Apex | 24 | 21 | Oregon Steel | |
| 5/29 | Indianapolis AlleyCats | 23 | 20 | Chicago Union | |
| 5/29 | Toronto Rush | 18 | 23 | DC Breeze | |
| 5/30 | Atlanta Hustle | 21 | 26 | Carolina Flyers | |
| 5/30 | Houston Havoc | 13 | 24 | Seattle Cascades | |
| 5/30 | Salt Lake Shred | 34 | 17 | Oregon Steel | |
| 5/30 | Montreal Royal | 17 | 23 | DC Breeze | |
| 5/30 | Philadelphia Phoenix | 23 | 24 | Pittsburgh Thunderbirds | 2OT |
| 5/30 | Oakland Spiders | 23 | 17 | San Diego Growlers | |
| 5/31 | Madison Radicals | 20 | 23 | Minnesota Wind Chill | |
| 5/31 | Toronto Rush | 16 | 18 | Boston Glory | |
| 5/31 | Austin Sol | 25 | 20 | Seattle Cascades | |

=== Week 7 ===
| Date | Home | Goals | Goals | Away | OT |
|---|---|---|---|---|---|
| 6/5 | Boston Glory | 17 | 21 | New York Empire | |
| 6/5 | Chicago Union | 18 | 16 | Madison Radicals | |
| 6/5 | DC Breeze | 24 | 22 | Carolina Flyers | |
| 6/5 | San Diego Growlers | 19 | 20 | Austin Sol | OT |
| 6/5 | Salt Lake Shred | 22 | 23 | Colorado Apex | |
| 6/6 | Vegas Bighorns | 11 | 27 | Austin Sol | |
| 6/6 | Montreal Royal | 14 | 18 | New York Empire | |
| 6/6 | Philadelphia Phoenix | 14 | 17 | Boston Glory | |
| 6/6 | Pittsburgh Thunderbirds | 17 | 31 | Carolina Flyers | |
| 6/6 | Minnesota Wind Chill | 23 | 19 | Indianapolis AlleyCats | |
| 6/6 | Oakland Spiders | 23 | 15 | Colorado Apex | |

With their first win of the season, Chicago became the seventh franchise in UFA history to reach 100 wins.

=== Week 8 ===
| Date | Home | Goals | Goals | Away | OT |
|---|---|---|---|---|---|
| 6/12 | Atlanta Hustle | 29 | 14 | Houston Havoc | |
| 6/12 | New York Empire | 15 | 17 | Boston Glory | OT |
| 6/12 | Oakland Spiders | 18 | 19 | Minnesota Wind Chill | |
| 6/12 | Oregon Steel | 18 | 25 | Salt Lake Shred | |
| 6/13 | Carolina Flyers | 32 | 11 | Houston Havoc | |
| 6/13 | DC Breeze | 18 | 27 | Boston Glory | |
| 6/13 | Vegas Bighorns | 12 | 34 | Minnesota Wind Chill | |
| 6/13 | Philadelphia Phoenix | 22 | 21 | Montreal Royal | |
| 6/13 | Toronto Rush | 33 | 11 | Pittsburgh Thunderbirds | |
| 6/13 | Colorado Apex | 21 | 22 | San Diego Growlers | |
| 6/13 | Seattle Cascades | 20 | 19 | Salt Lake Shred | |
| 6/14 | Madison Radicals | 18 | 17 | Indianapolis AlleyCats | |
| 6/14 | Pittsburgh Thunderbirds | 22 | 18 | Chicago Union | |

After winning their first seven games by an average of 11 goals, Oakland suffered their first loss of the season to the Wind Chill. However, with Colorado's loss to San Diego, Oakland also became the first team to qualify for the playoffs.

=== Week 9 ===
| Date | Home | Goals | Goals | Away | OT |
|---|---|---|---|---|---|
| 6/18 | Madison Radicals | 19 | 23 | Salt Lake Shred | |
| 6/19 | Atlanta Hustle | 27 | 16 | Vegas Bighorns | |
| 6/19 | Austin Sol | 21 | 20 | San Diego Growlers | 2OT |
| 6/19 | Minnesota Wind Chill | 20 | 16 | Salt Lake Shred | |
| 6/19 | Montreal Royal | 25 | 18 | Philadelphia Phoenix | |
| 6/19 | Oregon Steel | 22 | 21 | Toronto Rush | OT |
| 6/20 | Carolina Flyers | 27 | 15 | Vegas Bighorns | |
| 6/20 | Boston Glory | 30 | 14 | Philadelphia Phoenix | |
| 6/20 | Houston Havoc | 20 | 23 | San Diego Growlers | |
| 6/20 | Indianapolis AlleyCats | 18 | 13 | Chicago Union | |
| 6/20 | Seattle Cascades | 17 | 22 | Toronto Rush | |
| 6/21 | Chicago Union | 11 | 15 | Madison Radicals | |

The following teams qualified for the playoffs this week: Austin (victory over San Diego), Minnesota (victory over Salt Lake), Boston (Toronto's loss to Oregon), Carolina (victory over Vegas). Austin's overtime win, their fourth of the season, set a new record for overtime wins by a single team in a season.

=== Week 10 ===
| Date | Home | Goals | Goals | Away | OT |
|---|---|---|---|---|---|
| 6/26 | Carolina Flyers | 21 | 20 | Atlanta Hustle | OT |
| 6/26 | Colorado Apex | 17 | 26 | Oakland Spiders | |
| 6/26 | Vegas Bighorns | 11 | 13 | Houston Havoc | |
| 6/26 | Seattle Cascades | 20 | 18 | Oregon Steel | |
| 6/27 | Salt Lake Shred | 19 | 20 | Oakland Spiders | |
| 6/27 | San Diego Growlers | 25 | 15 | Houston Havoc | |
| 6/27 | Indianapolis AlleyCats | 17 | 21 | Madison Radicals | |

=== Week 11 ===
| Date | Home | Goals | Goals | Away | OT |
|---|---|---|---|---|---|
| 7/1 | Philadelphia Phoenix | 17 | 28 | New York Empire | |
| 7/3 | Colorado Apex | 11 | 18 | Seattle Cascades | |
| 7/3 | Madison Radicals | 18 | 31 | Indianapolis AlleyCats | |
| 7/3 | Minnesota Wind Chill | 25 | 16 | Chicago Union | |
| 7/3 | Philadelphia Phoenix | 17 | 21 | DC Breeze | |
| 7/4 | Salt Lake Shred | 22 | 23 | Seattle Cascades | OT |
| 7/4 | San Diego Growlers | 28 | 18 | Vegas Bighorns | |
| 7/5 | Chicago Union | 20 | 24 | Indianapolis AlleyCats | |
| 7/5 | Pittsburgh Thunderbirds | 19 | 26 | Minnesota Wind Chill | |
| 7/5 | Montreal Royal | 18 | 17 | Toronto Rush | |

Colorado's loss to Seattle eliminated Colorado from playoff contention, meaning that Seattle and Salt Lake qualified. DC's win plus Toronto's loss means that DC can't finish worse than third, but does not mathematically eliminate Toronto.

=== Week 12 ===
| Date | Home | Goals | Goals | Away | OT |
|---|---|---|---|---|---|
| 7/10 | Carolina Flyers | 21 | 20 | Austin Sol | |
| 7/10 | Chicago Union | 18 | 31 | New York Empire | |
| 7/10 | Madison Radicals | 31 | 19 | Pittsburgh Thunderbirds | |
| 7/10 | Oregon Steel | 18 | 23 | Seattle Cascades | |
| 7/11 | Atlanta Hustle | 20 | 22 | Austin Sol | |
| 7/11 | DC Breeze | 28 | 17 | Philadelphia Phoenix | |
| 7/11 | Indianapolis AlleyCats | 24 | 14 | Pittsburgh Thunderbirds | |
| 7/11 | Minnesota Wind Chill | 20 | 21 | Boston Glory | |
| 7/12 | Toronto Rush | 24 | 30 | New York Empire | |

All remaining playoff spots were settled this week: New York (victory over Chicago), Madison (victory over Pittsburgh), Indianapolis (victory over Pittsburgh), and San Diego (Atlanta's loss to Austin) qualified for the playoffs, although seeding is still to be determined in some cases. Austin and Minnesota, the two remaining undefeated teams, both lost a game.

=== Week 13 ===
| Date | Home | Goals | Goals | Away | OT |
|---|---|---|---|---|---|
| 7/17 | Houston Havoc | 15 | 21 | Austin Sol | |
| 7/17 | Madison Radicals | 21 | 14 | Chicago Union | |
| 7/17 | New York Empire | 37 | 20 | Philadelphia Phoenix | |
| 7/17 | Salt Lake Shred | 19 | 22 | Oakland Spiders | |
| 7/18 | Atlanta Hustle | 22 | 24 | DC Breeze | |
| 7/18 | Colorado Apex | 20 | 29 | Oakland Spiders | |
| 7/18 | Austin Sol | 23 | 15 | Houston Havoc | |
| 7/18 | Boston Glory | 25 | 11 | Montreal Royal | |
| 7/18 | San Diego Growlers | 34 | 12 | Vegas Bighorns | |
| 7/18 | Chicago Union | cancelled | | Pittsburgh Thunderbirds | |
| 7/18 | Toronto Rush | 28 | 17 | Indianapolis AlleyCats | |
| 7/18 | Seattle Cascades | 22 | 24 | Oregon Steel | |
| 7/19 | Pittsburgh Thunderbirds | 25 | 29 | Indianapolis AlleyCats | |
| 7/19 | Minnesota Wind Chill | 23 | 16 | Madison Radicals | |

== Standings ==
Standings are first sorted by win-loss record. Ties are broken by head-to-head record, head-to-head goal difference, and if necessary, Adjusted Division Point Differential.

=== Central ===
| Team | W | L | GD | Qualification |
|---|---|---|---|---|
| Minnesota Wind Chill | 11 | 1 | +79 | First round bye |
| Madison Radicals | 7 | 5 | +3 | Playoffs |
| Indianapolis AlleyCats | 6 | 6 | +10 | Playoffs |
| Pittsburgh Thunderbirds | 2 | 9 | -99 | |
| Chicago Union | 1 | 10 | -61 | |

=== East ===
| Team | W | L | GD | Qualification |
|---|---|---|---|---|
| Boston Glory | 11 | 1 | +74 | First round bye |
| New York Empire | 10 | 2 | +105 | Playoffs |
| DC Breeze | 9 | 3 | +31 | Playoffs |
| Toronto Rush | 6 | 6 | +27 | |
| Montreal Royal | 3 | 9 | -26 | |
| Philadelphia Phoenix | 1 | 11 | -110 | |

=== West ===
| Team | W | L | GD | Qualification |
|---|---|---|---|---|
| Oakland Spiders | 11 | 1 | +105 | First round bye |
| Seattle Cascades | 8 | 4 | +24 | Playoffs |
| Salt Lake Shred | 5 | 7 | +20 | Playoffs |
| Colorado Apex | 3 | 9 | -84 | |
| Oregon Steel | 2 | 10 | -82 | |

=== South ===
| Team | W | L | GD | Qualification |
|---|---|---|---|---|
| Austin Sol | 11 | 1 | +71 | First round bye |
| Carolina Flyers | 10 | 2 | +90 | Playoffs |
| San Diego Growlers | 7 | 5 | +36 | Playoffs |
| Atlanta Hustle | 5 | 7 | +43 | |
| Houston Havoc | 2 | 10 | -101 | |
| Vegas Bighorns | 0 | 12 | -155 | |

== Postseason ==
The first round of the playoffs was hosted by the #2 seed in each division. Division Championship games were hosted by the #1 seed. After the four division winners were crowned, teams were re-seeded based on win/loss record and goal differential in order to determine the matchups at Championship Weekend.

First Round; 24–26 July
2 | Madison Radicals | 15
3 | Indianapolis AlleyCats | 17
2 | Carolina Flyers | 25
3 | San Diego Growlers | 14
2 | New York Empire | 23
3 | DC Breeze | 15
2 | Seattle Cascades | 20
3 | Salt Lake Shred | 22

Division Championships; 7–9 August
1 | Minnesota Wind Chill | 22
3 | Indianapolis AlleyCats | 20
1 | Austin Sol | 24
2 | Carolina Flyers | 23
1 | Boston Glory | 21
2 | New York Empire | 24
1 | Oakland Spiders | 20
3 | Salt Lake Shred | 16

Semi-Finals; 27 August
Minnesota Wind Chill | 28
Austin Sol | 24
New York Empire | 21
Oakland Spiders | 27

Final; 28 August
Minnesota Wind Chill | 16
Oakland Spiders | 21

Minnesota v Austin's 52-goal semifinal marked the most goals scored in a playoff game since 2018, when the Dallas Roughnecks and New York Empire combined for 62 goals.

Oakland continued their record of having never lost a game at Championship Weekend.

Instead of a third-place game, Championship Weekend featured an all-star game featuring a team of players from the Western Ultimate League against a team of players from the Premier Ultimate League for the second consecutive year. The PUL all-stars won the game, 20–18.

== Season Awards ==
An asterisk (*) indicates a unanimous selection.

| Award | Winner | Runners-up |
|---|---|---|
| Most Valuable Player | Tobe Decraene (BOS) | Alex Atkins (NY), Elliot Hawkins (IND) |
| Rookie of the Year | Chander Boyd-Fliegel (OAK) | Max Pettenuzzo (TOR), Nick Whitlock (NY) |
| Defensive Player of the Year | Cooper Williams (CAR) | Carter Lankford (OAK), John Randolph (NY) |
| Coach of the Year | Liam Kreiss (OAK) | Ben Feldman (MIN), Casey Hogg and Joe Iannacone (AUS) |
| Most Improved Player | Miles Grovic (DC) | Elliot Hawkins (IND), Chase Rawlins (PHI) |

Liam Kreiss's Coach of the Year award marks the first time the award was won by a first-year head coach.

=== Individual Leaders ===
| Category | Number | Leader(s) |
|---|---|---|
| Assists | 71 | Elliot Hawkins (IND) |
| Goals | 50 | Pieran Robert (MAD) |
| Scores | 109 | Tobe Decraene (BOS) |
| Blocks | 24 | Cooper Williams (CAR) |
| Receiving Yards | 4005 | Elliot Hawkins (IND) |
| Throwing Yards | 5929 | Gordon Larson (MIN) |
| Total Yards | 8925 | Alex Atkins (NY) |
| Completions | 630 | Gordon Larson (MIN) |

=== All-UFA Teams ===
First Team

- Alex Atkins (NY)*
- Tobe Decraene (BOS)*
- Jacob Fairfax (CAR)
- Elliot Hawkins (IND)*
- Kyle Henke (AUS)*
- Daniel Ritthaler (OAK)*
- Chad Yorgason (SLC)

Second Team

- Will Brandt (MIN)
- Daan De Marrée (NY)
- Walker Frankenberg (OAK)
- Ben Jagt (NY)
- Jordan Kerr (SLC)
- Gordon Larson (MIN)
- Garrett Martin (SEA)

Third Team

- Malik Auger-Semmar (MTL)
- Thomas Edmonds (BOS)
- Khalif El-Salaam (SD)
- Evan Magsig (OAK)
- John Randolph (NY)
- Pieran Robert (MAD)
- Jason Vallee (OAK)

=== All-Defense Teams ===
First Team

- Justin Burnett (MIN)
- Oscar Graff (BOS)
- Carter Lankford (OAK)*
- Ricky McLeod (SEA)
- John Randolph (NY)*
- Drew Swanson (CAR)
- Cooper Williams (CAR)*

Second Team

- Dylan DeClerck (MIN)
- Lander Decraene (BOS)
- Paul Krenik (MIN)
- Cameron Lacy (MIN)
- Evan Magsig (OAK)
- Matt Tucker (CAR)
- Nick Whitlock (NY)

=== All-Rookie Teams ===
First Team

- Chander Boyd-Fliegel (OAK)*
- Lander Decraene (BOS)
- George Gust (AUS)
- Jacob Louie (CAR)
- Ricky McLeod (SEA)
- Max Pettenuzzo (TOR)*
- Nick Whitlock (NY)*

Second Team

- Ezra Beidler-Shenk (PHI)
- Spencer Dillon (TOR)
- Anton Orme (OAK)
- Charlie Panarella (NY)
- Justin Podnar (TOR)
- Weibe van den Brink (DC)
- Eric Zhuang (TOR)
