= 2023 American Ultimate Disc League season =

- League: American Ultimate Disc League
- Sport: Ultimate
- Duration: April 28 – August 26, 2023
- Teams: 24

Regular season
- Season MVP: Jeff Babbitt (NY)

Postseason
- Central Division champions: Minnesota Wind Chill
- East Division champions: New York Empire
- South Division champions: Austin Sol
- West Division champions: Salt Lake Shred
- Postseason MVP: Antoine Davis (NY)

Finals
- Champions: New York Empire (3)
- Runners-up: Chicago Union

UFA seasons
- ← 2022 2024 →

The 2023 American Ultimate Disc League season was the league's eleventh. The New York Empire won their third championship after a second consecutive undefeated season, becoming the first franchise to win three championships and only the second franchise to win consecutive championships. Jeff Babbitt won the league's MVP award, and Antoine Davis won the Championship Weekend MVP award.

== Preseason ==
The Houston Havoc joined the league's South division, while the Tampa Bay Cannons and Ottawa Outlaws ceased operations.

== Regular season ==
=== Week 1 ===
Date	Home	Goals	Goals	Away
4/28	Salt Lake Shred	28	20	Seattle Cascades
4/29	Atlanta Hustle	23	14	Indianapolis AlleyCats
4/29	New York Empire	17	8	Philadelphia Phoenix
4/29	Houston Havoc	18	24	Austin Sol
4/29	Pittsburgh Thunderbirds	18	17	Madison Radicals
4/29	Carolina Flyers	16	21	DC Breeze
4/29	Oakland Spiders	24	23	Seattle Cascades

=== Week 2 ===
Date	Home	Goals	Goals	Away
5/5	Atlanta Hustle	24	19	Carolina Flyers
5/5	Oregon Steel	20	22	Salt Lake Shred
5/5	New York Empire	24	11	Toronto Rush
5/5	San Diego Growlers	16	23	Colorado Apex
5/6	Indianapolis AlleyCats	21	23	Minnesota Wind Chill
5/6	Austin Sol	31	17	Dallas Legion
5/6	Los Angeles Aviators	15	18	Colorado Apex
5/6	Boston Glory	25	14	Toronto Rush
5/6	Seattle Cascades	19	25	Salt Lake Shred
5/7	DC Breeze	20	19	Philadelphia Phoenix

=== Week 3 ===
Date	Home	Goals	Goals	Away
5/12	Atlanta Hustle	21	17	Austin Sol
5/12	Los Angeles Aviators	20	13	Oregon Steel
5/13	DC Breeze	17	18	New York Empire
5/13	Chicago Union	16	19	Indianapolis AlleyCats
5/13	Colorado Apex	26	14	Seattle Cascades
5/13	San Diego Growlers	22	19	Oregon Steel
5/13	Carolina Flyers	26	19	Austin Sol
5/13	Dallas Legion	17	28	Houston Havoc
5/13	Detroit Mechanix	13	29	Pittsburgh Thunderbirds
5/13	Oakland Spiders	25	27	Salt Lake Shred
5/13	Toronto Rush	25	20	Montreal Royal
5/13	Boston Glory	19	16	Philadelphia Phoenix

=== Week 4 ===
Date	Home	Goals	Goals	Away
5/19	Houston Havoc	17	23	San Diego Growlers
5/19	Oregon Steel	23	24	Oakland Spiders
5/19	Salt Lake Shred	25	13	Los Angeles Aviators
5/20	Philadelphia Phoenix	16	18	New York Empire
5/20	Indianapolis AlleyCats	22	21	Madison Radicals
5/20	Austin Sol	21	17	San Diego Growlers
5/20	Toronto Rush	13	20	DC Breeze
5/20	Minnesota Wind Chill	26	12	Pittsburgh Thunderbirds
5/20	Colorado Apex	18	14	Los Angeles Aviators
5/20	Seattle Cascades	20	24	Oakland Spiders
5/20	Montreal Royal	15	17	Boston Glory
5/21	Carolina Flyers	21	15	Atlanta Hustle

=== Week 5 ===
Date	Home	Goals	Goals	Away
5/26	Carolina Flyers	24	11	Houston Havoc
5/27	Atlanta Hustle	20	11	Houston Havoc
5/27	Madison Radicals	18	20	Chicago Union
5/27	Pittsburgh Thunderbirds	19	20	Philadelphia Phoenix
5/27	Detroit Mechanix	17	25	Minnesota Wind Chill
5/27	Montreal Royal	12	15	Toronto Rush
5/28	Chicago Union	16	12	Minnesota Wind Chill
5/28	Dallas Legion	14	25	Austin Sol

=== Week 6 ===
Date	Home	Goals	Goals	Away
6/2	Oregon Steel	18	27	Seattle Cascades
6/2	Boston Glory	5	8	New York Empire
6/2	DC Breeze	19	20	Carolina Flyers
6/2	Austin Sol	23	19	Houston Havoc
6/3	Philadelphia Phoenix	20	17	Carolina Flyers
6/3	Houston Havoc	21	19	Dallas Legion
6/3	Salt Lake Shred	21	17	Oakland Spiders
6/3	San Diego Growlers	21	22	Los Angeles Aviators
6/3	Montreal Royal	10	16	New York Empire
6/3	Minnesota Wind Chill	20	18	Chicago Union
6/3	Detroit Mechanix	15	21	Indianapolis AlleyCats
6/4	Madison Radicals	22	17	Pittsburgh Thunderbirds
6/4	Colorado Apex	27	22	Oakland Spiders

=== Week 7 ===
Date	Home	Goals	Goals	Away
6/9	Oregon Steel	11	29	Los Angeles Aviators
6/9	Boston Glory	15	21	Atlanta Hustle
6/9	Dallas Legion	19	27	Carolina Flyers
6/9	Colorado Apex	18	19	Salt Lake Shred
6/10	New York Empire	20	17	Atlanta Hustle
6/10	Indianapolis AlleyCats	26	17	Chicago Union
6/10	Austin Sol	20	22	Carolina Flyers
6/10	Toronto Rush	23	27	Philadelphia Phoenix
6/10	Minnesota Wind Chill	18	17	Madison Radicals
6/10	Seattle Cascades	23	25	Los Angeles Aviators
6/10	Oakland Spiders	21	17	San Diego Growlers
6/11	Pittsburgh Thunderbirds	28	18	Detroit Mechanix
6/11	Montreal Royal	12	22	Boston Glory

=== Week 8 ===
Date	Home	Goals	Goals	Away
6/16	Salt Lake Shred	20	19	Colorado Apex
6/16	DC Breeze	23	14	Montreal Royal
6/16	New York Empire	25	16	Boston Glory
6/17	Houston Havoc	15	18	Austin Sol
6/17	Atlanta Hustle	29	14	Dallas Legion
6/17	Philadelphia Phoenix	22	13	Montreal Royal
6/17	Indianapolis AlleyCats	20	19	Detroit Mechanix
6/17	Chicago Union	21	15	Oregon Steel
6/17	San Diego Growlers	19	20	Seattle Cascades
6/17	Toronto Rush	18	17	Pittsburgh Thunderbirds
6/17	Madison Radicals	19	24	Minnesota Wind Chill
6/17	Oakland Spiders	24	23	Colorado Apex
6/18	Los Angeles Aviators	23	14	Seattle Cascades

=== Week 9 ===
Date	Home	Goals	Goals	Away
6/23	Houston Havoc	14	23	Atlanta Hustle
6/23	Chicago Union	25	20	Detroit Mechanix
6/23	Madison Radicals	22	23	Indianapolis AlleyCats
6/23	Montreal Royal	18	25	DC Breeze
6/24	Dallas Legion	12	23	Atlanta Hustle
6/24	Colorado Apex	25	15	Minnesota Wind Chill
6/24	Boston Glory	16	20	DC Breeze
6/24	Detroit Mechanix	12	18	Chicago Union
6/24	Los Angeles Aviators	22	18	San Diego Growlers
6/25	Toronto Rush	26	19	Montreal Royal

=== Week 10 ===
Date	Home	Goals	Goals	Away
6/30	Oregon Steel	16	24	Colorado Apex
6/30	Los Angeles Aviators	18	20	Salt Lake Shred
6/30	New York Empire	21	18	DC Breeze
6/30	Pittsburgh Thunderbirds	25	15	Detroit Mechanix
7/1	Indianapolis AlleyCats	23	17	Madison Radicals
7/1	Austin Sol	25	16	Dallas Legion
7/1	San Diego Growlers	16	26	Salt Lake Shred
7/1	Seattle Cascades	9	18	Colorado Apex
7/1	Toronto Rush	21	24	Boston Glory
7/2	Montreal Royal	10	18	Philadelphia Phoenix

=== Week 11 ===
Date	Home	Goals	Goals	Away
7/7	Philadelphia Phoenix	20	21	Boston Glory
7/7	Madison Radicals	13	15	Minnesota Wind Chill
7/7	Pittsburgh Thunderbirds	21	18	Chicago Union
7/7	Austin Sol	25	20	Houston Havoc
7/7	Salt Lake Shred	30	14	Oregon Steel
7/8	DC Breeze	22	15	Boston Glory
7/8	Chicago Union	20	14	Pittsburgh Thunderbirds
7/8	Dallas Legion	21	24	Austin Sol
7/8	Oakland Spiders	25	10	Oregon Steel
7/8	Detroit Mechanix	14	23	Madison Radicals
7/9	Minnesota Wind Chill	22	17	Indianapolis AlleyCats

=== Week 12 ===
Date	Home	Goals	Goals	Away
7/14	Oregon Steel	18	15	San Diego Growlers
7/14	Colorado Apex	15	19	New York Empire
7/15	Philadelphia Phoenix	18	20	DC Breeze
7/15	Indianapolis AlleyCats	18	16	Pittsburgh Thunderbirds
7/15	Seattle Cascades	29	22	San Diego Growlers
7/15	Salt Lake Shred	19	23	New York Empire
7/15	Minnesota Wind Chill	22	13	Chicago Union
7/15	Carolina Flyers	19	25	Atlanta Hustle
7/15	Dallas Legion	23	16	Houston Havoc
7/15	Oakland Spiders	20	19	Los Angeles Aviators
7/15	Detroit Mechanix	13	25	Toronto Rush

=== Week 13 ===
Date	Home	Goals	Goals	Away
7/21	Los Angeles Aviators	24	23	Oakland Spiders
7/21	Boston Glory	18	12	Montreal Royal
7/21	DC Breeze	27	17	Toronto Rush
7/21	Chicago Union	17	22	Madison Radicals
7/22	Houston Havoc	15	18	Dallas Legion
7/22	Atlanta Hustle	23	22	Carolina Flyers
7/22	New York Empire	28	19	Montreal Royal
7/22	Philadelphia Phoenix	25	22	Toronto Rush
7/22	San Diego Growlers	20	19	Oakland Spiders
7/22	Madison Radicals	18	15	Detroit Mechanix
7/22	Pittsburgh Thunderbirds	20	21	Indianapolis AlleyCats
7/22	Seattle Cascades	25	15	Oregon Steel
7/23	Minnesota Wind Chill	22	16	Detroit Mechanix
7/25	Carolina Flyers	27	21	Dallas Legion

== Standings ==
=== East ===
Team	W	L	%	GD	Qualification
New York Empire	12	0	1.000	+66	First round bye
DC Breeze	9	3	0.750	+47	Playoffs
Boston Glory	7	5	0.583	+7	Playoffs
Philadelphia Phoenix	6	6	0.500	+10	
Toronto Rush	5	7	0.417	-23	
Montreal Royal	0	12	0.000	-81	

=== Central ===
Team	W	L	%	GD	Qualification
Minnesota Wind Chill	10	2	0.833	+40	First round bye
Indianapolis AlleyCats	9	3	0.750	+14	Playoffs
Chicago Union	6	6	0.500	-2	Playoffs
Pittsburgh Thunderbirds	5	7	0.417	+10	
Madison Radicals	4	8	0.333	+3	
Detroit Mechanix	0	12	0.000	-92	

=== South ===
Team	W	L	%	GD	Qualification
Atlanta Hustle	10	2	0.833	+66	First round bye
Austin Sol	9	3	0.750	+46	Playoffs
Carolina Flyers	7	5	0.583	+23	Playoffs
Houston Havoc	2	10	0.167	-52	
Dallas Legion	2	10	0.167	-80	

=== West ===
Team	W	L	%	GD	Qualification
Salt Lake Shred	11	1	0.917	+60	First round bye
Colorado Summit	8	4	0.667	+51	Playoffs
Los Angeles Aviators	7	5	0.583	+20	Playoffs
Oakland Spiders	7	5	0.583	+14	
Seattle Cascades	4	8	0.333	-24	
San Diego Growlers	3	9	0.250	-31	
Oregon Steel	1	11	0.083	-92	

== Postseason ==
First Round
2	DC Breeze	19
3	Boston Glory	12
2	Austin Sol	19
3	Carolina Flyers	18
2	Indianapolis AlleyCats	23
3	Chicago Union	15
2	Colorado Summit	21
3	Los Angeles Aviators	22

Division Championships
1	New York Empire	24
2	DC Breeze	19
1	Atlanta Hustle (2OT)	20
2	Austin Sol	21
1	Minnesota Wind Chill	21
2	Indianapolis AlleyCats	18
1	Salt Lake Shred	23
3	Los Angeles Aviators	20

Semi-Finals
New York Empire	27
Austin Sol	17
Salt Lake Shred (OT)	19
Minnesota Wind Chill	18

Final
New York Empire	19
Salt Lake Shred	12

== Season Awards ==
- Most Valuable Player: Jeff Babbitt (NY)
- Defensive Player Of The Year: Antoine Davis (NY)
- Rookie Of The Year: Lukas Ambrose (SEA)
- Most Improved Player: Jace Duennebeil (SLC)
- Coach Of The Year: Bryce Merrill (SLC)

=== Individual Leaders ===
- Assists: 76, Ryan Osgar (NY)
- Goals: 60, Jeff Babbitt (NY)
- Blocks: 24, Lukas Ambrose (LA)
- Scores: 103, Jordan Kerr (SLC)
- Receiving Yards: 4193, Evan Swiatek (ATX)
- Throwing Yards: 5962, Pawel Janas (LA)
- Total Yards: 8092, Pawel Janas (LA)
- Completions: 860, Pawel Janas (LA)
- Points Played: 353, Kyle Henke (ATX)

=== All-AUDL Teams ===
First Team

- Jeff Babbitt (NY)
- Brett Hulsmeyer (ATL)
- Ben Jagt (NY)
- Pawal Janas (LA)
- Jordan Kerr (SLC)
- Sean McDougall (LA)
- Ryan Osgar (NY)

Second Team

- Christian Boxley (DC)
- Quinn Finer (COL)
- Kyle Henke (ATX)
- John Randolph (NY)
- Max Sheppard (PIT)
- Evan Swiatek (ATX)
- Jack Williams (NY)

Third Team

- Antoine Davis (NY)
- Travis Dunn (SD)
- Jacob Fairfax (CAR)
- Mac Hecht (OAK)
- Jonny Malks (DC)
- Garrett Martin (SEA)
- Jacob Miller (SLC)

=== All-Rookie Teams ===
First Team

- Lukas Ambrose (LA)
- Sam Berglund (MIN)
- Simon Carapella (BOS)
- Walker Frankenberg (OAK)
- Liam Haberfield (ATL)
- William Wettengel (IND)
- McKay Yorgason (SLC)

Second Team

- Raekwon Adkins (OAK)
- Tanner Barcus (MIN)
- Tobias Brooks (CAR)
- Dexter Clyburn (OAK)
- Max Gibson (SD)
- Anthony Gutowsky (MAD)
- Calvin Trisolini (PHI)

=== All-Defense Teams ===
First Team

- Lukas Ambrose (LA)
- Justin Burnett (ATL)
- Antoine Davis (NY)
- Ben Jagt (NY)
- John Randolph (NY)
- Cody Spicer (COL)
- Joey Wylie (ATX)

Second Team

- Dylan DeClerck (MIN)
- Ryan Drost (NY)
- Brett Hulsmeyer (ATL)
- AJ Merriman (DC)
- Paul Owens (PHL)
- Kyle Weinberg (SLC)
- William Wettengel (IND)
