= 2014 American Ultimate Disc League season =

American Ultimate Disc League
- Season: 2014
- Champions: San Jose Spiders
- Highest scoring: Minnesota Wind Chill (42)
- Longest winning run: Toronto Rush (12)

The 2014 American Ultimate Disc League season was the third season for the league. Each team played a 14-game schedule. The San Jose Spiders won the AUDL Championship III over the Toronto Rush in Toronto, Ontario, Canada. The Spiders enjoyed the most successful season of all teams, finishing with a 16-1 record. Their only loss came to the San Francisco FlameThrowers in Week 6.

== Offseason ==
=== Expansion ===
- The Montreal Royal, the San Jose Spiders, the Seattle Raptors, the Salt Lake Lions, the San Francisco Flamethrowers, and the Vancouver Riptide joined the league.

=== Renaming ===
- The Windy City Wildfire change their name to the Chicago Wildfire

=== Contraction ===
- The New Jersey Hammerheads suspended operations due to financial issues

== Regular season standings ==
=== Eastern Division ===
Team	W	L	PD	PCT
T- Toronto Rush	13	1	+117	.929
P- New York Empire	10	4	+86	.714
P- DC Breeze	10	4	+28	.714
Montreal Royal	6	8	-8	.429
Philadelphia Phoenix	2	12	-89	.143
Rochester Dragons	1	13	-134	.071

=== Midwestern Division ===
Team	W	L	GD	PCT
T- Madison Radicals	12	2	+127	.857
P- Windy City Wildfire	9	5	+63	.643
P- Indianapolis AlleyCats	9	5	+13	.643
Minnesota Wind Chill	8	6	+39	.571
Cincinnati Revolution	4	10	-73	.286
Detroit Mechanix	0	14	-169	.000

=== Western Division ===
Team	W	L	GD	PCT
T- San Jose Spiders	13	1	+112	.929
P- SF FlameThrowers	11	3	+73	.786
Vancouver Riptide	8	6	+41	.571
Seattle Raptors	3	11	-19	.214
Salt Lake Lions	0	14	-207	.000

T indicates top seed in the playoffs. P indicates a team advanced to the playoffs. PD indicates point difference.

== Playoffs ==
The playoffs expanded to 8 teams in 2014.

Divisional Title
E3	DC	11
E1	Toronto	37
E2	New York	22
M2	Chicago	17
M3	Indianapolis	16
M1	Madison	25
W1	San Jose	26
W2	San Francisco	16

Playoff Semifinals
E1	Toronto	31
E2	New York	16
M1	Madison	20
W1	San Jose	23

AUDL Championship III
E1	Toronto	18
W1	San Jose	28

== See also ==
- UltiAnalytics AUDL team and player statistics
