= Philadelphia Spinners =

Professional ultimate (frisbee) team based in Philadelphia, Pennsylvania

- Founded: 2012
- League: Major League Ultimate
- Conference: Eastern
- Based in: Philadelphia, Pennsylvania
- Stadium: Franklin Field (2012, 2014); Colonial Stadium (2013―2015); Sweeney Field (2014); Villanova Stadium (2015); Marple Newtown High School (2015); Carey Stadium (2015―2016)
- Colors: Blue, White, Red
- Championships: AUDL: 1 (2012); MLU: 1 (2016)

The Philadelphia Spinners were a professional ultimate team based in Philadelphia, Pennsylvania. They were founded in 2012 by Katrel Kelly and David Fitzgerald as a team in the American Ultimate Disc League (AUDL), but then moved to Major League Ultimate (MLU) in 2013. They played in the MLU until the league was suspended in 2016. The team played in various stadiums throughout the Greater Philadelphia region.

== History ==
=== AUDL ===
==== 2012 ====
The Spinners were established in 2012 as one of the original eight teams of the American Ultimate Disc League. Katrel Kelly and David Fitzgerald developed the initial stages of the team but later gave their ownership to Jeff Snader who took control as head coach and general manager.

The 2012 season officially began on April 14, 2012 with the team's home opener at Franklin Field versus the Buffalo Hunters. The start time for the game was originally slated to begin at 8:05 p.m., however a large crowd of fans still entering the stadium caused the opening pull to be delayed. The game concluded with the Spinners defeating Buffalo 26–14 in front of 1,800 fans.

The season continued with a 13–2 record (with the only loses coming to the Connecticut Constitution on the road and the Detroit Mechanix at home, and one postponed game that was not re-played) and about 900 fans attending each home game. The Spinners clinched the first seed for the Eastern conference and home field advantage for the conference championship match. The Spinners were originally to play the second place Connecticut Constitution in the eastern conference championship, but due to legal problems, Connecticut was disqualified from the playoffs. The Spinners instead played the third place Rhode Island Rampage, who they defeated 35–21. This advanced the Spinners to the AUDL championship in Detroit at the Silverdome on August 11, 2012. The Spinners defeated the western conference champions Indianapolis AlleyCats 29–21.

Jake Rainwater represented the Spinners on the 2012 All AUDL team.

On August 2, 2012, the Spinners played the NexGen ultimate team (a group of 15 college all-stars from across the United States) in an exhibition match. The NexGen team won 24–17.

=== MLU ===
Two months after winning the AUDL championship, team owner, coach, and general manager Jeff Snader confirmed in an interview with Steve Leinert that he would be creating a new ultimate league, known as Major League Ultimate. This move was made after Snader made it aware that he had a dislike in how the AUDL was being run (the AUDL had each franchise individually pay expenses and received no help from the league). Snader would become the commissioner of the league and Spinners organization worker Nic Darling would become Vice President of Marketing. An agreement was made with the AUDL so that Snader could keep ownership of the Spinners name and logo, meaning that the team would transfer over to the new league. However, several players from the 2012 season did not come over to the new league with the team (though several did not join the new Philadelphia AUDL franchise either).

==== 2013 ====
The Spinners 2013 season began away versus the DC Current. New head coach and general manager Bill Maroon led the team to an 18–16 victory. A victory the following week at the New York Rumble gave the Spinners a 2–0 record to start the season. The home opener took place on May 4, 2013 at Colonial Stadium at Plymouth Whitemarsh High School in Plymouth Meeting, PA (which acted as home stadium in the 2013 season as Franklin Field was under renovation). The Spinners lost to the DC Current 18–15. The loss sparked a 7-game losing streak. The streak ended on June 22, when the Spinners defeated the DC Current 19–18 in their final game of the season. The Spinners ended their first MLU Season with a 3–7 record, coming in last place in the Eastern Conference.

==== 2014 ====
The Spinners made many major signings during the 2014 offseason, including (but not limited to) bringing back Jake Rainwater and David Brandolph of the 2012 roster, signing Matt Esser of the Philadelphia Phoenix, and the signing of four University of Pittsburgh players who won two back-to-back college championships. The Spinners announced on March 24, 2014 that the team's five home games would be spread out among three different stadiums: the first and last game would be held at Franklin Field, the second game at Colonial Stadium, and the third and fourth games at Sweeney Field at Saint Joseph's University.

After losing the season opener at home to the DC Current on April 12, 2014, the Spinners would start their season 1–2 with a victory over the New York Rumble on April 26. The Spinners would alternate between wins and loses for most of the season (including an upset victory at home versus the defending champions the Boston Whitecaps). Luckily, with a second victory at home over Whitecaps on June 15, the two teams were tied for second place in the Eastern Conference. A Whitecaps loss versus the Rumble and a Spinners victory over the Current would clinch the second playoff spot for the Spinners. However, on June 21, the Whitecaps defeated the Rumble 21–16, meaning the Spinners would have to win later that night to bring up a tie-breaking scenario. This did not play out, as the Spinners fell to the Current 21–19, ending their season.

Matt Esser was awarded the Eastern Conference Rookie of the Year award for 2014.

==== 2015 ====
In the off season, the Spinners managed to re-sign Esser, veteran Patrick Diviney, and Ben Scharadin, but they lost key players, such as David Brandolph who left to coach the Philadelphia Phoenix, who he played for in 2013, and three of the University of Pittsburgh players, who were signed in 2013, that left to play for the new Pittsburgh franchise of the AUDL. On April 2, 2015, the Spinners announced that for the second season in a row, three stadiums would share the five home games. Colonial Stadium would again host games (the first two), the third game would be held at Villanova Stadium (which would be the first game to feature luxury box seating), and the final two games would be played at Marple Newtown High School in Newtown Township, Delaware County, Pennsylvania. However, on June 15 the Spinners announced their final game was rescheduled to earlier in the day and moved to Carey Stadium at Germantown Academy in Fort Washington, Pennsylvania.

On April 18, 2015, the Spinners played their season opener at home, defeating the Boston Whitecaps 22–20. After losing to the defending champions the DC Current, the Spinners went on a four-game winning streak to start the season with a 5–1 record. This streak ended on June 6 with a 26–24 overtime loss to the Current, the Spinners only home loss that season. After a second versus the New York Rumble, the Spinners went into week ten tied with the Whitecaps for first place at 5–3, and one game ahead of the Current who were 4–4. A 17–14 victory over the Current clinched a playoff spot for the Spinners and for the Whitecaps who also won that week against the Rumble. The Spinners faced the Whitecaps in an away game that would break the tie for the first place spot and decide home field advantage for the Eastern Conference championship. The Spinners lost 26–13.

On June 27, 2015, the Spinners played their first playoff game in the MLU. The game stayed close until the fourth quarter, when the Whitecaps won 21–16 to advance to their second MLU championship game.

Billy Sickles was named Eastern Conference Rookie of the Year for 2015.

==== 2016 ====
The 2016 offseason introduced some front office changes. Billy Maroon stepped down from coaching duties and as general manager. Darryl Stanley (the former assistant coach of the Philadelphia Phoenix) was announced as head coach, and Rusty May (former operations manager for the San Francisco Dogfish) was named head of operations. Germantown Academy's Carey Stadium was announced to be the sole home stadium.

On April 9, 2016, the Spinners defeated the New York Rumble 22–12 in their first game of the season. The next day, they won their home opener against the Boston Whitecaps 18–16. The Spinners would have a record of 9–1 for the 2016 season, their best record since the 2012 AUDL season, in which they had a record of 14–2. The only loss was a 20–19 loss in Boston. This record clinched the Spinners the number one seed in the conference and home field advantage in the Eastern conference championship game.

On June 26, 2016, the Spinners defeated the Whitecaps 20–16, advancing them to their first championship game since 2012, and their first in MLU history.

On July 16, 2016, the Spinners defeated the Western Conference champion Portland Stags 14–11 at Franklin Field in Philadelphia to win the 2016 MLU championship. Charlie McCutcheon was the 2016 MLU Championship MVP. The Spinners became the first professional ultimate frisbee team to win a championship in both the MLU and AUDL. Billy Sickles was named the 2016 Eastern Conference MVP and Head Coach Darryl Stanley was named the 2016 Eastern Conference Coach of the Year.

After the season MLU announced its operations were being suspended indefinitely.

== Logo and uniform ==
=== Logo ===
2012 AUDL Logo

For the 2012 AUDL season, the Spinners used a logo featuring a disc in a spinning tornado. The logo was chosen from several designs submitted to the team through their Facebook page. A fan vote on the AUDL's Facebook page ranked it as the best logo in the league. It was replaced before the 2013 season in order to reflect the Spinner's move to Major League Ultimate. The new logo featured a spinning "S" inside of a crest, a format utilized by all of the Eastern Division teams in the MLU.

=== Jersey ===
The 2012 AUDL jersey was chosen through a contest on the Spinners's Facebook page. The winning design was created by future player Nick Purifico. The home jersey was red with a thick lighter-red line running down the middle of the front. The front featured the team logo in the middle, and the player's number in blue on the upper left chest. The back had the player's name up top and the number in the center. The away jersey was similar with a white Jersey instead of red, and a light blue line. The kits had red and white shorts, respectively.
