= 2013 American Ultimate Disc League season =

American Ultimate Disc League
- Season: 2013
- Champions: Toronto Rush
- Longest winning run: Toronto Rush (16)

The 2013 American Ultimate Disc League season was the second season for the league. Each team played a 16-game schedule. The Toronto Rush won the AUDL Championship II over the Madison Radicals in Chicago, IL. The Rush completed the first undefeated season in AUDL history, going 16-0 in the regular season and winning both playoff games.

== Offseason ==
=== Relocation ===
- The Bluegrass Revolution relocated to from Lexington, Kentucky to Cincinnati, Ohio due to poor attendance

== Standings ==
=== Eastern Division ===
Team	W	L	GD	PCT
T- Toronto Rush	16	0	+171	1.000
P- New York Empire	11	5	+46	.688
P- Philadelphia Phoenix	9	7	+7	.563
Rochester Dragons	6	10	-50	.375
DC Breeze	4	12	-85	.250
New Jersey Hammerheads	2	14	-89	.125

=== Midwestern Division ===
Team	W	L	GD	PCT
T- Windy City Wildfire	14	2	+97	.875
P- Madison Radicals	13	3	+51	.813
P- Indianapolis AlleyCats	9	7	+29	.563
Minnesota Wind Chill	4	12	-20	.250
Cincinnati Revolution	4	12	-76	.250
Detroit Mechanix	4	12	-81	.250

T indicates top seed in the playoffs. P indicates a team advanced to the playoffs

== Playoffs ==
Divisional Semifinals
M3	Indianapolis	15
M2	Madison	18
E3	Philadelphia	13
E2	New York	21

Divisional Finals
M1	Windy City	15
M2	Madison	21
E1	Toronto	25
E2	New York	18

AUDL Championship II
E	Toronto	16
M	Madison	14
