= Beau Kittredge =

American sportsperson and video game developer

Personal information
- Born: June 23, 1982 (age 44) Fairbanks, Alaska
- Education: University of Colorado
- Occupations: Semi-professional Ultimate player and video game developer

Sport
- Sport: Ultimate
- College team: University of Colorado
- League: AUDL and USAU Open Club Division
- Club: Johnny Bravo (2005-08); Revolver (2009-17); PoNY (2018-19)
- Team: San Francisco Dogfish (2013); San Jose Spiders (2014-2015); Dallas Roughnecks (2016); San Francisco FlameThrowers (2017); New York Empire (2018-19)

Beau Kittredge is a former Ultimate player, author, illustrator, and mobile video game entrepreneur. He is considered to be one of the greatest Ultimate players of all time, noted for his top-end speed and athleticism. Kittredge won one college title (three finals), six USA Ultimate club titles (nine finals), seven world championships, and five AUDL titles. He also won the AUDL Most Valuable Player award twice. He is popularly known for a video in which he jumped over an opponent to catch the disc while playing with the University of Colorado.

== Personal life ==
Kittredge was born in Fairbanks, Alaska. He attended Lathrop High School before going to the University Of Colorado. Beau is an author of five children's books and the founder of Snowsuit Studios, a company that develops mobile video games.

== Ultimate career ==
=== Amateur Club ===
Kittredge played Ultimate for University of Colorado Mamabird, winning one collegiate championship, before playing for club teams Johnny Bravo, Revolver, and PoNY, winning a total of six club titles. He has also played for the United States national team, winning two WFDF World Ultimate and Guts Championships and three World Games titles. He has two world championships representing Revolver in the Open division at the WFDF World Ultimate Club Championships.

=== Semi-Professional ===
In 2013, Kittredge signed with the San Francisco Dogfish of the now-defunct Major League Ultimate. After a season with the Dogfish, he moved to the San Jose Spiders, an AUDL team. In his first season for the Spiders, Kittredge recorded 36 goals, 32 assists and 31 blocks, whilst starting all 15 games. The Spiders finished the season by beating Toronto Rush 28–18 to win the 2014 AUDL Championship, resulting in Kittredge being named league MVP. Kittredge helped the Spiders to a second straight Championship victory in 2015 in a 17–15 win against Madison Radicals. Over the season, he recorded 33 assists, 66 goals and 24 blocks. He was also named the league MVP for the second year in a row. In 2016, Kittredge signed for the Dallas Roughnecks for their inaugural season in the league. Injury meant that Kittredge was unable to have a full season, as he tore his ACL and MCL in a game against Charlotte Express. Despite this, he recorded 9 assists, 22 goals and 9 blocks during the season, with the Roughnecks still managing a perfect 15–0 record for the season to win the 2016 AUDL Championship. Beau signed for the San Francisco FlameThrowers for the 2017 season, winning the championship over the Toronto Rush, and in 2018 went to the New York Empire where he won a championship in 2019.

== Career AUDL Statistics ==
=== Regular season ===
Season	Team	Games Played	Goals	Assists	Blocks
2014	SJ	12	36	32	31
2015	SJ	13	66	33	24
2016	DAL	6	22	9	9
2017	SF	8	12	13	6
2018	NY	12	19	15	10
2019	NY	11	8	3	14
Totals		62	163	105	94

=== Postseason ===
Season	Team	Games Played	Goals	Assists	Blocks
2014	SJ	3	13	2	3
2015	SJ	3	2	4	2
2016	DAL	2	6	3	2
2017	SF	3	13	7	1
2018	NY	3	3	3	2
2019	NY	3	0	1	3
Totals		17	37	20	13

== Honors ==
- UPA College Championships: 2004
- USAU Club Championships: 2010, 2011, 2013, 2015, 2017, 2018
- World Ultimate and Guts Championships: 2012, 2016
- World Ultimate Club Championships: 2010, 2014
- World Games: 2009, 2013, 2017
- AUDL Championships: 2014, 2015, 2016, 2017, 2019
- AUDL MVP: 2014, 2015
