= 2012 American Ultimate Disc League season =

American Ultimate Disc League
- Season: 2012
- Champions: Philadelphia Spinners

The 2012 American Ultimate Disc League season was the first season for the league. Each team was scheduled to play a 16-game schedule. The Philadelphia Spinners won the championship over the Indianapolis AlleyCats at the Pontiac Silverdome. After the season all but three teams (Detroit Mechanix, Indianapolis AlleyCats, and the Bluegrass Revolution) left or folded.

== Lawsuit ==
The first season of the AUDL was marred by controversy as the league sued two of its franchises, the Connecticut Constitution and the Rhode Island Rampage. The Connecticut Constitution were not allowed to play in the playoffs due to being fined $20,000 by the AUDL and refusing to pay. As a result, the Rhode Island Rampage become the second seed in the Eastern Division playoff game.

== Standings ==
=== Eastern Division ===
Team	W	L	Conf
T- Philadelphia Spinners	13	2	10-1
Connecticut Constitution	8	8	8-4
P- Rhode Island Rampage	6	8	3-8
Buffalo Hunters	4	12	2-10

The Constitution were disqualified from the postseason due to unpaid fines.

=== Western Division ===
Team	W	L	Conf
P- Indianapolis AlleyCats	9	7	6-6
P- Bluegrass Revolution	9	7	7-5
Columbus Cranes	7	9	6-6
Detroit Mechanix	7	9	4-8

T indicates top seed in the playoffs. P indicates a team advanced to the playoffs.

== Playoffs ==
Divisional Playoffs
W2	Bluegrass Revolution	20
W1	Indianapolis AlleyCats	24
E2	Rhode Island Rampage	22
E1	Philadelphia Spinners	30

Championship
W	Indianapolis AlleyCats	22
E	Philadelphia Spinners	29
