= Sweeney Field =

Sporting venue in the United States

- Sweeny
- Interactive map of Sweeney Field
- Location: 5600 City Avenue; Philadelphia, PA 19141
- Coordinates: 39.9946664°N 75.2367851°W
- Owner: Saint Joseph's University
- Operator: Saint Joseph's University
- Capacity: 3,000

Construction
- Opened: 1929

Tenants
- Saint Joseph's Hawks (Soccer, Rugby, Lacrosse); Philadelphia Spinners (2014, 2 games)

Sweeney Field (previously called Finnesey Field) is a multi-use sports facility on the Saint Joseph's University campus in Philadelphia, Pennsylvania, which opened in 1929 and was originally planned to be the centerpiece to a 70,000 seat football stadium in the natural bowl of the campus.

In 1960, both the original grandstand and hillside seating were eliminated for the construction of Villiger (now Post) Building/Bluett Theater. That construction necessitated raising the field's level some five feet above its earlier location. In 1990, the facility's usage was greatly expanded with the installation of artificial turf. That expansion continued in 1994 when lights were added. During the summer of 2001, the Field received a facelift when new turf was installed. More recently, bleachers were built into the hill closest to Barbelin Hall and on either end of the field.

During the summer of 2008, the field was resurfaced with a FIFA approved surface called TigerTurf, and the track was completely resurfaced. The field plays host to men's and women's soccer and men's and women's lacrosse. The women's field hockey team played its last season on Finnesey Field in 2007 and now play at Ellen Ryan Field.

In 2014, the field was home field for the Philadelphia Spinners of Major League Ultimate for two games. Both games resulted in wins over the Boston Whitecaps. They were two of the highest attended games for the Spinners that season.

2015 boasted a new scoreboard for the field; with added information such as player number and foul counter. The new scoreboard is located to the left of the original one.

Overall, the site has seen 1,053 games entering the 2008–09 academic year, and SJU teams put together a total record of 493-518-42 in 79 years.
