= Colorado Apex =

Ultimate frisbee team based in Golden, Colorado

- Founded: 2022
- League: Ultimate Frisbee Association
- Division: West
- Based in: Golden, Colorado
- Stadium: Marv Kay Stadium
- Head coach: Tim Kefalas
- Website: watchufa.com/apex

The Colorado Apex, formerly known as the Colorado Summit, are a professional ultimate team based in the Denver metropolitan area. The Apex compete in the Ultimate Frisbee Association (UFA) as a member of the West Division. The team plays its home games at the Colorado School of Mines' Marv Kay Stadium.

== Franchise history ==
=== 2022 season ===
The Summit played their first season in 2022, when the UFA was known as the American Ultimate Disc League (AUDL). The Summit, along with fellow new teams Portland Nitro and Salt Lake Shred, joined the AUDL's West Division alongside the Los Angeles Aviators, the San Diego Growlers, and the Seattle Cascades.

The Summit finished the 2022 regular season with an 11–1 record and reached the AUDL semifinals but lost 19–14 to the Chicago Union. Multiple Summit players earned end-of-season honors—Jonathan Nethercutt was named to First Team All-AUDL, Quinn Finer and Cody Spicer were named to both Second Team All-AUDL and All-AUDL Rookie First Team, and Mathieu Agee, Alex Atkins, and Alex Tatum were all named to All-AUDL Rookie Second Team. Spicer also earned All-AUDL Defense Team honors.

=== 2023 season ===
The Summit went 8–4 in 2023 and made the playoffs for the second year in a row, but lost in the second round to the Aviators. Finer was named to the Second Team All-AUDL and Cody Spicer was named to the All-AUDL Defense Team.

=== 2024 season ===
Before the 2024 season, the AUDL rebranded and reorganized into the Ultimate Frisbee Association.

=== 2026 season ===
After the 2025 season, the Summit relinquished their name to Denver Summit FC, a new National Women's Soccer League team, and rebranded as the Colorado Apex.

== Season-by-season results ==
Season	GP	W	L	W-L%	Playoffs
2022	12	11	1	.917	Loss, AUDL semifinals (Chicago Union)
2023	12	8	4	.667	Loss, West Division semifinals (Los Angeles Aviators)
2024	12	6	6	.500	DNQ (4th place, West Division)
2025	12	8	4	.750	Loss, West Division semifinals (Oakland Spiders)
