= Ultimate Frisbee Association =

Sports league

- Sport: Ultimate frisbee
- Founded: 2010
- First season: 2012
- No. of teams: 22
- Country: United States (20 teams); Canada (2 teams)
- Most recent champion: Oakland Spiders (2026)
- Most titles: New York Empire, Oakland Spiders (3)
- Broadcaster: watchUFA.tv
- Website: watchufa.com

The Ultimate Frisbee Association (UFA) is a professional ultimate frisbee league in North America. The league comprises 22 teams divided between the South, Central, East, and West divisions. Each UFA season has 12 regular season games which run from April to July. Following the conclusion of the regular season, the top three teams from every division advance to the playoffs, a single elimination tournament that culminates in a final four style showcase known as the UFA Championship Weekend, which is contested in late August over two days.

The UFA was founded in 2012 as the American Ultimate Disc League (AUDL), before renaming itself the Ultimate Frisbee Association for the 2024 season.

The New York Empire and the Oakland Spiders are tied for most championships at three. The reigning league champions are the Oakland Spiders, who defeated the Minnesota Wind Chill by a score of 21-16 in the 2026 UFA Championship Game.

== History ==
=== Founding and inaugural season ===
The UFA was founded by Josh Moore in 2012 as the American Ultimate Disc League (AUDL).

The first AUDL game was won by the Connecticut Constitution on April 14, 2012, over the Rhode Island Rampage by a score of 29 to 23, and the first goal was scored by Brent Anderson of the Constitution. The first championship was held on August 11, 2012, and was won by the Philadelphia Spinners by a score of 29 to 22 over the Indianapolis AlleyCats.

In the first season, the league consisted of eight teams broken into the Eastern and Western conferences. Jonathan "Goose" Helton of the AlleyCats was named league MVP for the inaugural season. Helton, alongside Evan Boucher, Cameron Brock, Rob Dulabon, Dave Hochholter, John Korber, and Jake Rainwater were named to the first All-AUDL Team.

=== 2012 lawsuit ===
In May 2012, the AUDL announced its plans for expansion for the following season, including franchises in New Jersey, New York, and Boston. Owners of the Connecticut Constitution and Rhode Island Rampage contended that the Boston and New York franchises impinged upon their Territory Licensing Agreements, which specified a non-compete radius of 100 miles. Separately, the league compensated the Philadelphia Spinners for the encroachment of the New Jersey and New York franchises. Negotiations between the Constitution, the Rampage, and the league reached an impasse in early June and the franchises' owners threatened legal action. The league preemptively sued the owners on June 17. As negotiations wore on, the league (at least twice) offered various settlements to the owners of the Constitution and the Rampage, but those offers were rejected. On July 5, the Constitution suspended team operations due to legal fees, missing two games. The league then fined the team the maximum fine of $10,000 per game, which Constitution owner Bryan Ricci called "severe and excessive" and refused to pay. Both the Constitution and Rampage had games cancelled near the end of the season. The Constitution would have earned a playoff berth but were disqualified due to their unpaid fines and the Rampage advanced in their place, losing to the Philadelphia Spinners in the Division final.

In December 2012, the league and team owners reached a settlement. Details of the settlement are unknown due to a non-disclosure agreement. Neither the Rampage nor the Connecticut Constitution returned to the AUDL in 2013.

=== 2013–2023 ===
For the 2013 season, the Indianapolis AlleyCats and the Detroit Mechanix were the only teams from the 2012 season to remain in their cities, while the Bluegrass Revolution relocated from Lexington, KY to Cincinnati, OH and the Buffalo Hunters relocated and rebranded as the Rochester Dragons. Even with only four teams left, the league still managed to expand to twelve teams overall.

In 2014, the league expanded to 17 teams, including the introduction of the West Division. The league also reached a multi-year broadcasting deal with ESPN3 that covered 14 regular season games, a playoff game, and the Championship Weekend.

In 2015, the league expanded to 25 teams. The new expansion teams consisted of the Pittsburgh Thunderbirds, Ottawa Outlaws, Los Angeles Aviators, San Diego Growlers, Jacksonville Cannons, Nashville NightWatch, Raleigh Flyers, Atlanta Hustle, and Charlotte Express. In March 2015, the Salt Lake Lions announced that they would be suspending operations for the entire 2015 season; leaving the West Conference with only 6 teams. In October 2015, the AUDL announced that the Lions franchise had been bought back by the league, making that hiatus permanent. In the same announcement, the league welcomed the Austin Sol and Dallas Roughnecks to the South Division. Shortly thereafter, the AUDL announced that the Rochester Dragons franchise was also being contracted and that the league was again hoping to start a franchise in the Boston area.

Also in 2015, the Raleigh Flyers of the AUDL signed the first ever female professional ultimate player, Jessi Jones, to play in their game against the Nashville Nightwatch. Jones, who was a team USA U-23 player in 2013, was signed as part of "Women's Ultimate Day".

In September 2016, the Cincinnati Revolution and the Charlotte Express announced they would be ceasing operations.

In the 2017 season, Jesse Shofner was selected to the roster for the Nashville Nightwatch, which made her the first female player to make a full season AUDL roster. Shofner subsequently scored two goals in the Nightwatch's first game of the 2017 season, making her the first woman to do so in any AUDL game.

Before the 2018 season, the Vancouver Riptide announced they would be leaving Vancouver.

Before the 2019 season, the Nashville Nightwatch and the San Francisco FlameThrowers announced they would be ceasing operations.

On December 4, 2019, the league announced that a new Boston franchise (later named the Boston Glory) would join the league for the 2020 season, its first expansion since 2016. That same day, the league announced a divisional realignment plan that saw the Midwest renamed the Central, the dissolution of the South into a combo South-East Atlantic Division, and the two Texas teams moving to the West division, among other moves.

The 2020 season was canceled due to the COVID-19 pandemic.

Due to COVID-related travel restrictions, in the 2021 season the three Canadian teams played in an independent series, the Canada Cup. The 19 U.S. teams competed in three divisions: Atlantic, Central, and West. The Boston Glory and the New York Empire moved from the East Division, which did not exist in 2021, to the Atlantic Division.

In December 2021, the league announced three new franchises, the Colorado Summit, Salt Lake Shred, and Portland Nitro. With the addition of these teams the divisions were realigned, with a new South division in place of the Atlantic division. Also in December 2021, the Dallas Roughnecks announced that they were rebranding as the Dallas Legion. In February 2022, the San Jose Spiders announced a move to nearby Oakland.

After the 2022 season, the league announced the addition of the Houston Havoc, and the departure of the Tampa Bay Cannons and Ottawa Outlaws.

=== 2024 rebranding ===
On January 17, 2024 the league announced it was rebranding as the Ultimate Frisbee Association (UFA). The league partnered with Sport Dimension Inc. (SDI), owner of the Wham-O brand family which includes the Frisbee trademark to license the name for use across the league. Multiple new logos were designed as part of the league's new brand identity. In 2024 the UFA announced it would be streaming the "Super Series", top weekly games for free, live on YouTube.

After the 2024 season, the Portland Nitro changed their name to the Oregon Steel, and the Dallas Legion suspended operations. In January 2025 the league announced a division realignment and the addition of the Vegas Bighorns.

After the 2025 season, the Detroit Mechanix and the Los Angeles Aviators left the league. The Colorado Summit changed its name to the Colorado Apex, and the Bighorns changed divisions.

== Rules ==
The UFA features a number of rule changes from the traditional set of rules laid out and established by USA Ultimate (USAU) and the World Flying Disc Federation (WFDF).

The field area is expanded to 53 1/3 yards wide and 80 yards long with 20-yard end zones (the same size as an American football field, but with the end zones taking up twice as much of the field as in American football). Games are timed with four-quarters of 12 minutes each, including a 15-minute halftime. If the score is tied, a five-minute overtime period is played. If the score remains tied after overtime, a second overtime is played in which the first team to score wins.

Notable changes from the USAU format include the use of referees who count the stall and call all fouls, a drop in the stall count from 10 seconds to 7, a ten-yard penalty for most fouls and violations (such as travelling), the addition of "flagrant" and "technical" fouls, and no prohibition against double-team marking. While different from the USAU and WFDF rules, many of these changes were also seen in the MLU.

== Teams ==
The UFA consists of 22 teams, all based in North America, divided into four geographic divisions. During the regular season, each team is allowed an unlimited number of players on its roster; for each game, the team must pick between 12 and 20 of these to be active/rostered (eligible to play).

=== Active teams ===
Teams in the Ultimate Frisbee Association
Team	City/Area	Stadium	First Season
East
Boston Glory	Boston, MA	Hormel Stadium	2021 (due to cancellation of 2020 season)
DC Breeze	Washington, DC	Carlini Field	2013
Montreal Royal	Montreal, QC	Complexe sportif Claude-Robillard	2014
New York Empire	New York City, NY	The Stadium at Memorial Field	2013
Philadelphia Phoenix	Philadelphia, PA	Neumann University Turf Field	2013
Toronto Rush	Toronto, ON	Varsity Stadium	2013
Central
Chicago Union	Chicago, IL	Martin Stadium	2013 (as Windy City Wildfire)
Indianapolis AlleyCats*	Indianapolis, IN	Kuntz Memorial Soccer Stadium	2012
Madison Radicals	Madison, WI	Breese Stevens Field	2013
Minnesota Wind Chill	Saint Paul, MN	Sea Foam Stadium	2013
Pittsburgh Thunderbirds	Pittsburgh, PA	Highmark Stadium	2015
South
Atlanta Hustle	Atlanta, GA	Atlanta Silverbacks Park	2015
Austin Sol	Austin, TX	Westlake Chaparral Stadium	2016
Carolina Flyers	Durham, NC	Durham County Memorial Stadium	2015 (as Raleigh Flyers)
Houston Havoc	Houston, TX	SaberCats Stadium	2023
San Diego Growlers	San Diego, CA	Mission Bay High School	2015
Vegas Bighorns	Las Vegas, NV	Bengals Stadium	2025
West
Colorado Apex	Denver, CO	Marv Kay Stadium	2022 (as Colorado Summit)
Oakland Spiders	Oakland, CA	Tiger Stadium	2014 (as San Jose Spiders)
Oregon Steel	Portland, OR	Hilken Community Stadium	2022 (as Portland Nitro)
Salt Lake Shred	Salt Lake City, UT	Zions Bank Stadium	2022
Seattle Cascades	Seattle, WA	Seattle Memorial Stadium	2014 (as Seattle Raptors)

=== Former teams ===
Team	City/Area	Stadium	Season(s)	Notes
Charlotte Express	Charlotte, NC	Irwin Belk Complex	2015–2016	
Cincinnati Revolution*	Cincinnati, OH	Sheakley Athletic Center	2012 (as Bluegrass Revolution), 2013–2016	
Columbus Cranes*	Columbus, OH	Warhawks Stadium	2012	
Connecticut Constitution*	New Britain, CT	Arute Field	2012	
Dallas Legion	Dallas, TX	Colleyville Middle School	2016-2021 (as Dallas Roughnecks), 2022-2024	
Detroit Mechanix*	Lansing, MI	Hope Sports Complex	2012-2025	
Los Angeles Aviators	Los Angeles, CA	Great Park Championship Stadium	2015-2025	
Nashville NightWatch	Nashville, TN	Hunters Lane High School	2015–2018	
New Jersey Hammerheads	Trenton, NJ	Mercer County Community College Stadium	2013	
Ottawa Outlaws	Ottawa, ON	MNP Park	2015–2022	
Philadelphia Spinners*	Philadelphia, PA	Franklin Field	2012	Left to join MLU
Rhode Island Rampage*	Providence, RI	Pierce Memorial Field	2012	
Rochester Dragons*	Rochester, NY	Eunice Kennedy Shriver Stadium	2012 (as Buffalo Hunters), 2013–2015	
Salt Lake Lions	Salt Lake City, UT	Taylorsville High School Stadium	2014	
San Francisco FlameThrowers	Oakland, CA	Laney College Football Field	2014–2018	
Tampa Bay Cannons	St. Petersburg, FL	Gibbs High School	2015 (as Jacksonville Cannons)–2022	
Vancouver Riptide	Vancouver, BC	Swangard Stadium	2014–2017	

* Team was a founding member of the UFA

== Championships ==
Ultimate Frisbee Association championships
Season	Date	Champion	Final score	Runner-up	Venue	Location
2012	August 11, 2012	Philadelphia Spinners	29–22	Indianapolis AlleyCats	Pontiac Silverdome	Pontiac, MI
2013	August 4, 2013	Toronto Rush	16–14	Madison Radicals	Lane Tech Stadium	Chicago, IL
2014	July 27, 2014	San Jose Spiders	28–18	Toronto Rush	Varsity Stadium	Toronto, ON
2015	August 9, 2015	San Jose Spiders	17–15	Madison Radicals	Avaya Stadium	San Jose, CA
2016	August 7, 2016	Dallas Roughnecks	33–27	Seattle Cascades	Breese Stevens Field	Madison, WI
2017	August 27, 2017	San Francisco FlameThrowers	30–29	Toronto Rush	Complexe sportif Claude-Robillard	Montreal, QC
2018	August 12, 2018	Madison Radicals	20–16	Dallas Roughnecks	Breese Stevens Field	Madison, WI
2019	August 11, 2019	New York Empire	26–22	Dallas Roughnecks	Foothill College	Los Altos Hills, CA
2020	Season cancelled due to COVID-19					
2021	September 11, 2021	Raleigh Flyers	19–16	New York Empire	Audi Field	Washington, DC
2022	August 26, 2022	New York Empire	22–14	Chicago Union	Breese Stevens Field	Madison, WI
2023	August 26, 2023	New York Empire	19–12	Salt Lake Shred	TCO Stadium	Eagan, MN
2024	August 24, 2024	Minnesota Wind Chill	17-16	Carolina Flyers	Zions Bank Stadium	Herriman, UT
2025	August 23, 2025	Boston Glory	17-15	Minnesota Wind Chill	Breese Stevens Field	Madison, WI
2026	August 28, 2026	Oakland Spiders	21-16	Minnesota Wind Chill	Breese Stevens Field	Madison, WI

== MVP ==
Ultimate Frisbee Association MVPs
Season	Name	Team
2012	Jonathan "Goose" Helton	Indianapolis AlleyCats
2013	Jonathan "Goose" Helton	Windy City Wildfire
2014	Beau Kittredge	San Jose Spiders
2015	Beau Kittredge	San Jose Spiders
2016	Dylan Tunnell	Atlanta Hustle
2017	Jonathan Nethercutt	Raleigh Flyers
2018	Matthew "Rowan" McDonnell	DC Breeze
2019	Ben Jagt	New York Empire
2020	No MVP due to COVID-19	NA
2021	Ben Jagt	New York Empire
2022	Ryan Osgar	New York Empire
2023	Jeff Babbitt	New York Empire
2024	Jeff Babbitt	Boston Glory
2025	Tobe Decraene	Boston Glory
2026	Tobe Decraene	Boston Glory

== League commissioners ==
- Josh Moore (2012–2013)
- Steve Gordon (2013–2018)
- Steve Hall (2018–2024)
- Tim DeByl (2024–present)

== See also ==
- Major League Ultimate – defunct league which coexisted with the AUDL from 2013 to 2016
- Premier Ultimate League – women's league
- Western Ultimate League – women's league
