= Charlotte Express =

Former Ultimate Disc team from Charlotte, NC

- Founded: 2015
- Folded: 2016
- Division: South
- Based in: Charlotte, North Carolina
- Stadium: Irwin Belk Complex
- Colours: Blue, gold, and white
- Owner: Steve Hall, Monte Ritchey, Albert Banks
- Head coach: Courtney Dellinger
- Website: www.charlotteexpress.com

The Charlotte Express was a professional ultimate team from Charlotte, North Carolina playing in the South Division of the American Ultimate Disc League. The team was founded in 2015 and played its home games at the Irwin Belk Complex at Johnson C. Smith University in Charlotte, North Carolina. The team announced it would fold after the 2016 season.
