= Connecticut Constitution (AUDL) =

American professional ultimate team

- Founded: 2012
- Folded: 2012
- League: American Ultimate Disc League
- Division: Eastern
- Based in: New Britain, Connecticut
- Stadium: Arute Field

The Connecticut Constitution were a professional ultimate team based in New Britain, Connecticut. They were one of eight teams to take part in the American Ultimate Disc League's inaugural 2012 season. The team was in the Eastern Division of the AUDL. They played their first game on April 14, 2012, defeating the Rhode Island Rampage 29–23.

On July 5, 2012, the Connecticut Constitution announced that they would be suspending all team operations as the result of financial strain assumed during a lawsuit filed against the Constitution and Rhode Island Rampage by the AUDL. On July 11 the organization lifted the suspension for the remainder of the season. The team did not return for the 2013 season, and officially folded.

== Roster ==
Number	Player	Offense/Defense	Position	College
00	Christian Gaffney	Offense	Handler	SUNY Purchase
2	Brent Anderson	Offense	Cutter	UMass Amherst
4	Nick Judson	Defense	Cutter	University of Miami
5	Dwight Harris	Offense	Handler	University of Richmond
6	Chris Mazur	Defense	Handler	University of Miami
7	Misha Horowitz	Offense	Handler	Swarthmore College
8	Austin Raymond	Defense	Cutter	University of Connecticut
9	Husayn Carnegie	Defense	Cutter	NYU
10	Isaiah Bryant	Defense	Cutter	Columbia University
11	Eric Rathbun	Defense	Cutter	Central Connecticut State University
14	Joe Ouellette	Defense	Cutter	University of Connecticut
18	Seth Canetti	Offense	Handler	Cornell University
21	Joe Anderson	Defense	Cutter	SUNY Albany
22	Will Murphy	Defense	Cutter	Tufts
23	John Korber	Offense	Cutter	Tufts
24	Dan Casey	Offense	Handler	University of Connecticut
26	Andrew Bosco	Offense	Handler	Western Connecticut State University
28	Ben Weyers	Offense	Cutter	University of Connecticut
42	Stephen Glauser	Defense	Handler	University of Buffalo
47	Lucas Murphy	Defense	Handler	SUNY Albany
51	Rafe Steinhauer	Offense	Cutter	Princeton University
66	Garrett Santi	Defense	Cutter	Central Connecticut State University
67	Matt Tomasko	Defense	Cutter	Worcester Polytechnic Institute
81	Matt Baum	Offense	Handler	University of Connecticut
