= Cincinnati Revolution =

U.S. professional ultimate disc team

- Founded: 2012
- Disbanded: 2016
- League: American Ultimate Disc League (AUDL)
- Team history: Bluegrass Revolution; 2012; Cincinnati Revolution; 2013-2016
- Based in: Cincinnati, Ohio
- Stadium: Sheakley Athletic Centers
- Colors: Black, green
- Website: http://cincinnatirevolution.com/

The Cincinnati Revolution were a professional ultimate disc team based in Cincinnati, Ohio who competed in the American Ultimate Disc League (AUDL), now known as the Ultimate Frisbee Association, from 2012 to 2016. The Revolution played in the AUDL's Western Division in 2012 and in the Midwestern/Midwest Division from 2013 until their dissolution in 2016. They played their home games as the Bluegrass Revolution in 2012 at Henry Clay High School's Jack Bell Stadium in Lexington, Kentucky, and as the Cincinnati Revolution from 2013 to 2016 at the University of Cincinnati's Sheakley Athletics Center.

The Revolution were one of the AUDL's eight charter teams, and their lone AUDL playoff appearance was in 2012. The team's colors were black and green, and its logo was a fleur-de-lis.

== Franchise history ==
=== 2012 season ===
With the growing popularity of the sport of ultimate, the AUDL was formed in 2012 by Josh Moore with eight teams spanning the East Coast and Midwest. The Bluegrass Revolution were one of those eight inaugural teams, and they were initially composed of ultimate disc players from Kentucky and the surrounding area.In the 2012 season, the Revolution played in the AUDL's Western Division alongside the Detroit Mechanix, the Indianapolis AlleyCats, and the Columbus Cranes.

After starting the 2012 season 3–0 with wins over Indianapolis, Detroit, and Columbus, the Revolution finished second in the Western Division behind Indianapolis with a record of 9–7. In the 2012 AUDL playoffs, the Revolution played against the AlleyCats for the Western Division title but lost 24–20.

After the 2012 season, the Revolution relocated from Lexington to Cincinnati, Ohio. Despite their strong play in 2012, attendance at the Revolution's home games in Lexington was minimal throughout the year. The Revolution's relocation was also influenced by the folding of the Columbus Cranes, the AUDL's only franchise in Ohio at the time. Other factors that played into the move were Cincinnati's youth ultimate scene, which has one of the top high school teams in the nation, and the strong culture around ultimate disc in the area. Additionally, the Revolution was being able to play its home games at the University of Cincinnati's Sheakley Athletic Center, which was then regarded as one of the top stadiums in the league.

=== 2013 season ===
With the addition of four new teams before the 2013 season, the AUDL reorganized into two six-team divisions. The Revolution joined the new Midwestern Division alongside former Western Division rivals Indianapolis and Detroit as well as three new teams—the Windy City Wildfire (later renamed the Chicago Wildfire and then the Chicago Union), the Minnesota Wild Chill, and the Madison Radicals.

Despite their 9–7 record in 2012, the Cincinnati Revolution entered the 2013 season as an underdog and experts predicted the Revolution would rank fifth in the Midwestern Division. A loss to Detroit and two to Windy City left the Revolution at 1-3 and in last place in the Midwestern Division after four weeks of play. Continued strong play from handler Chris "Fudge" Powers and deep cutter Isaac Jeffries, however, gave the Revolution back-to-back victories over the Mechanix, bringing them back to .500 and moving them up to third in the division and fourth in the season's power rankings. However, the Revolution went on to lose three straight games against division rival Indianapolis and then drop its next two matches against Minnesota and Madison, falling to 3–8. A 23–21 win against Madison kept the Revolution's playoff hopes alive, but another bad loss to the Wind Chill in Week 12 eliminated them from playoff contention. Their 4-12 finish left them in last place in the Midwestern Division.

Despite the disappointing season, the Revolution's roster included several of the AUDL's top performers such. Powers, who lead the league with 74 assists, made the All-AUDL First Team, Jeffries recorded a team-high 36 goals and Mark Fedorenko established himself as a solid deep defender with a team-leading 29 blocks.

=== 2014 season ===
With the addition of six new team, the AUDL reorganized once again in 2014 into three divisions of six teams each.

After only bringing back four members of their previous year's roster in 2013, the Revolution's 2014 squad boasted many of their top players from years past, including Jeffries, Powers, and defensive captain Kevin Kula. The Revolution also brought back several key players from its 2012 playoff run, including Kentucky natives Ben Blatz and Ben Sever. They also drew multiple players from Indianapolis' roster, including Mike Ames and defensive handler Mike Ford. Other additions to the roster included Patrick Kaufmann from the University of Dayton and players from area club teams, like Phil Cherosky from the Columbus Madcow, Matt Muhlenkamp from the Dayton Enigma, and Joe Mozloom from Cincinnati Steamboat Ultimate. However, the roster was also without several key pieces from 2013, such as Ben Sage, Ryan Gorman, and Ryan Sitler. The remaining roster spots were filled by players who competed for a place on the team in a combination of open and closed tryouts and practices beginning on November 9.

After a series of scrimmages against the Indianapolis AlleyCats, the Revolution opened their 2014 campaign at home against the 2013 Midwest Champion Madison Radicals. Despite a strong first quarter, which resulted in a commanding 5–3 Revolution lead at the break, Cincinnati faltered in the second and third periods and fell to Madison 25–16. The Revolution collected their first win of the 2014 season the next week, however, beating heavily-favored Chicago in Cincinnati 23–22. It was arguably the biggest upset in franchise history, as the Revolution relied on Nate Botti (8 assists, 5 goals) throughout the game and staved off an impressive offensive performance by the Wildfire's A.J. Nelson (11 goals) in the game. Botti would go on to have a breakout year for the Revolution, leading the team with 47 assists while placing second on the team with 19 goals, one behind Matt Muhlenkamp.

The Revolution sat at 3-2 after the fifth week of the season but proceeded to lose their next eight games, falling out of playoff contention after losing a tight game to the AlleyCats in Indianapolis, 23–22. A final victory over the Mechanix ended the Revolution's 2014 season at 4–10 and in fifth place in the AUDL's Midwestern Division.

Despite the poor record, the Revolution saw improvement in 2014 from young players such as Alan Huels, who later developed into one of the league's best pullers and deep defenders, and Nick "High School" Bissonnette, who graduated from high school in the middle of the season but ended up playing 88 points for the Revolution over the course of the year. The Revolution were also the first team in professional ultimate disc to use a GoPro camera to record video from a radio-controlled helicopter during games.

=== 2015 season ===
The AUDL expanded once again in 2015, with nine new teams joining the league and one (the Salt Lake Lions) going on hiatus. The league subsequently reorganized into four divisions of varying size—the Revolution's renamed Midwest Division remained unchanged except for the addition of one of the nine new AUDL teams, the Pittsburgh Thunderbirds. The Revolution went 2-12 in 2015 and recorded a point differential of -117, the second-worst mark in the league.

=== 2016 season ===
The Revolution went winless in the 2016 season, ending the year at 0-14 with a -102 point differential, again ranking second-to-last in the AUDL.

On September 2nd, 2016, Cincinnati Revolution Professional Ultimate, LLC announced that the organization would be closing operations and that the Revolution would fold.
