= Salt Lake Shred =

Ultimate frisbee team based in Herriman, Utah

- Founded: 2022
- League: Ultimate Frisbee Association
- Division: West
- Based in: Herriman, Utah
- Stadium: Zions Bank Stadium
- Colors: Blue, yellow
- Owner: Ultimate Ramp, Inc
- Division titles: 2 (2023, 2025)
- Website: https://saltlakeshred.com/

The Salt Lake Shred are a professional ultimate team based in the Salt Lake City metropolitan area. The Shred compete in the Ultimate Frisbee Association (UFA) as a member of the West Division. The team plays its home games at Zions Bank Stadium, a soccer stadium in Herriman, Utah.

== Franchise history ==
=== 2022 season ===
The Shred's inaugural season was 2022, when the UFA was known as the American Ultimate Disc League (AUDL). With the addition of the Shred alongside two other teams, the Colorado Summit and the Portland Nitro, the AUDL reorganized ahead of the 2022 season. The new West Division included Salt Lake, Colorado, Portland, the Los Angeles Aviators, the Oakland Spiders, the San Diego Growlers, and the Seattle Cascades.

Multiple Shred players earned end-of-season honors in 2022—Jordan Kerr was named to First-Team All-AUDL, Chad Yorgasun to All-AUDL Defense Team and All-AUDL Rookie First Team, and Luke Yorgason to All-AUDL Rookie Second Team.

=== 2023 season ===
In the 2023 season Kerr received First Team All-AUDL honors again while Jacob Miller was named to the Third Team All-AUDL. McKay Yorgason was named to the All-AUDL Rookie First Team and Kyle Weinberg was named to All-AUDL Defense Second Team.

=== 2024 season ===
The AUDL rebranded to the Ultimate Frisbee Association (UFA) before the 2024 season. In the offseason, it was also announced that the 2024 UFA Championship Weekend was held at the Shred's home field, Zions Bank Stadium, on August 23rd and 24th.

=== 2025 season ===
Salt Lake had an impressive 2025 campaign going 11-1 in the regular season. Following the regular season, they beat Oakland for the West championship, went to Championship weekend where they fell to eventual champions the Boston Glory. The team was led in yards by Chad Yorgason with 6600, goals by Matt Russnogle with 45, Assists by Jordan Kerr with 50, and Blocks by Alex Forsberg with 15.

== Season-by-season results ==
Season	GP	W	L	W-L%	Finish	Playoffs
2022	12	10	2	.833	2nd, West Division	Lost, West Division Finals
2023	12	11	1	.917	1st, West Division	Lost, AUDL Finals
2024	12	10	2	.833	1st, West Division	Lost, West Division Finals
2025	12	11	1	.917	1st, West Division	Lost, AUDL semi-final
