= Chicago Union =

American professional ultimate team

- Sport: Ultimate frisbee
- Founded: 2013
- League: Ultimate Frisbee Association
- Division: Central
- Team history: Windy City Wildfire (2013-2019)
- Based in: Chicago, Illinois
- Stadium: 2017–2021 Langhurst Field; 2021–2023 De La Salle Institute; 2024–2025 Martin Stadium; 2026-Present Evanston Township High School Lazier Field
- Colors: Light Blue, White, and Red
- Head coach: Dave Woods
- Website: watchufa.com/union

The Chicago Union are a professional ultimate team based in Evanston, Illinois, a northern suburb of Chicago. The Union compete in the Ultimate Frisbee Association (UFA) as a member of the Central Division. The team was originally branded as the Windy City Wildfire. In their first year, the Wildfire had the best record in the then-Midwest Division and qualified for the playoffs in its first three seasons. They play home games at Evanston Township High School's Lazier Field (Officially Murney Lazier Field at Memorial Stadium) in Evanston, Illinois.

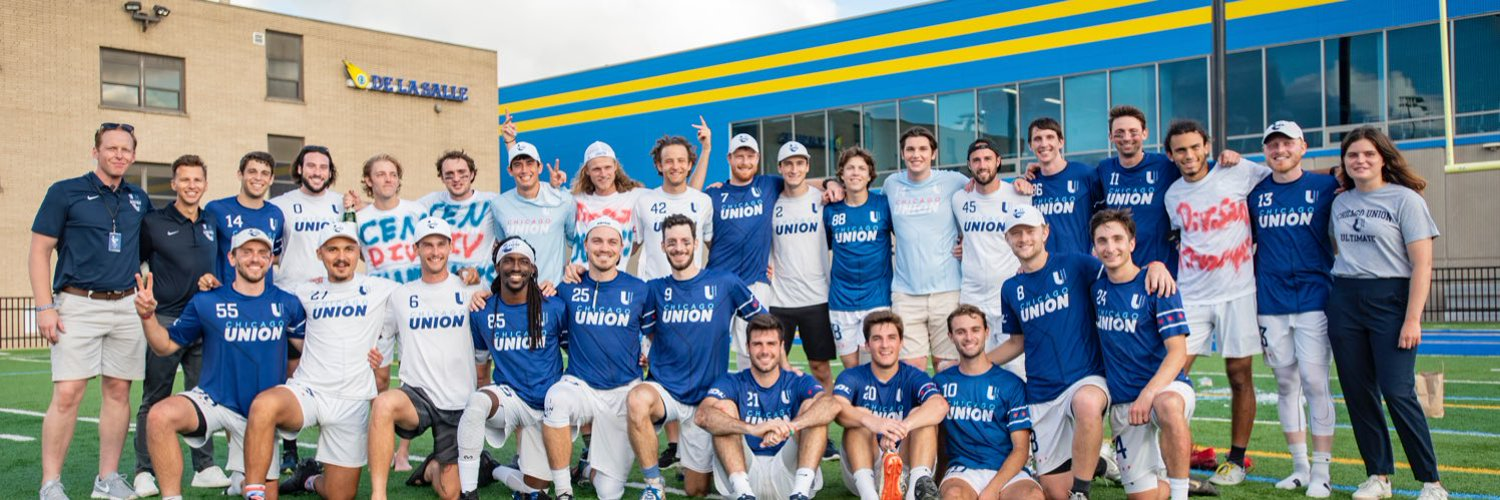
Chicago Union players and management

== History ==
=== Founding and inaugural season ===
In March 2012, Steve Gordon purchased the territory rights based in Chicago as part of the first wave of expansion to begin play in the 2013 season.

The Windy City Wildfire found a home field at Lane Tech College Prep. The inaugural season began in April 2013, and culminated with a 14–2 regular season record. The season ended with a first round playoff loss to the Madison Radicals.

=== 2014–2016 ===
Going into the 2014 season, team ownership made the decision to legally change the name of the franchise to the Chicago Wildfire. The second season provided a strong 9–5 record and gave the team a second-place finish in the division. The team ended the season with a first round playoff loss to the New York Empire.

In 2015, the organization decided to shift 5 of their 7 home games to Benedictine University, which is located in Lisle, Illinois. The season yielded an 8–5–1 record, allowing for a third-place finish in the division, and a postseason appearance against the Pittsburgh Thunderbirds. The post season was short lived, as the Chicago Wildfire fell to the Thunderbirds, ending their 2015 season.

For the 2016 season, all home games were moved back to the original home field of Lane Tech College Prep. The Wildfire fell to a record of 4–10 which tied them for 5th in the division with the Detroit Mechanix, and did not make the playoffs.

=== 2017 season ===
On January 1, 2017, Steve Gordon signed on Trent Kuhl as General Manager of the Chicago Wildfire. Former player and Assistant Coach Adrian King was named Head Coach, while Andrew "AJ" Nelson joined the coaching ranks as Assistant Coach. Returner Jack Shey and first time player Pawel Janas were elected as captains for the 2017 season. The Wildfire finished 3–11, but the future looked bright for the young core of talent on the team.

=== 2018 season ===
For the 2018 season, Adrian King returned as head coach. The team improved with a 5–9 record for the season.

The team moved to Benedetti–Wehrli Stadium in Naperville, Illinois, for the season.

=== 2019 season ===
In 2019, former player Dave Woods, took the reins from Adrian King and became the head coach of the Chicago Wildfire. Pawel Janas had a record breaking season for assists. The Wildfire finished at 7–5 and earned their first playoff bid since 2015. The team fell to Pittsburgh losing 21–20, ending their season.

The offseason allowed the Chicago Wildfire to take the big stage against the Indianapolis Alley Cats. The two teams battled at Soldier Field during the Chicago Bears halftime show. Over 60,000 fans attended the AUDL game as the Wildfire defeated the Alley Cats in the exhibition.

=== 2020 season ===
Weeks before the season was set to start, the league canceled the season due to the COVID-19 pandemic affecting the world. The Chicago Wildfire decided to retire the name and create an opportunity for a rebranding moment. After receiving many options from fans, the new era for Chicago professional ultimate will be represented by the Chicago Union.

=== 2021 season ===
In 2021, the Chicago Union finished first in the Central Division with a 10–2 record. In the first round of the playoffs the Union won their first playoff game, defeating Minnesota 22–18. They lost to New York in the semifinals 22–18.

=== 2022 season ===
In 2022, The Union finished first in the central division with an 11-1 record. They made it to the Championship but ultimately lost to the New York Empire. Kyle Rutledge was AUDL First Team All-Rookie. Pawel Janas was selected to the First Team All-AUDL.

=== 2023 season ===
In 2023, The Union finished third in the central division with a 6–6 record. They lost in the first round of the playoffs to the Indianapolis Alleycats 23–15.

=== 2024 season ===
The Union ended the 2024 season with a record of 7-5. While the Union finished third in the division, they did make it to the playoffs, but were narrowly defeated by the Madison Radicals in a thrilling double-overtime match.

This season marked the beginning of a new chapter for the Union as they started hosting games at Martin Stadium at Northwestern University.

=== 2025 season ===
In 2025, The Union finished with an undefeated record of 12-0, and placed 1st in the Central Division. During The Union's first playoff match against the Minnesota Wind Chill in the Divisional Finals, Chicago fell short, losing 19-17.

The Union continued to play their home games at Martin Stadium (Northwestern University) at Northwestern University during the 2025 season.

=== 2026 season ===
In the 2026 season, The Union began playing games at Evanston Township High School's Murney Lazier Field at Memorial Stadium (Referred to as "ETHS Lazier Field" by the Ultimate Frisbee Association and Chicago Union in published schedules). The Union left Martin Stadium (Northwestern University) due to scheduling conflicts with the Chicago Stars FC of the NWSL. According to an article by the Chicago Union, "Northwestern communicated early that there would not be enough available dates to host both our full season and the Stars’ first year in Evanston, and we fully support their expanded role in the broader sports landscape."

== Season-by-season results ==
Year	Regular season record	Divisional finish place	Playoffs result
2013	14-2	1st	Lost in first round
2014	9-5	2nd	Lost in first round
2015	8-5-1	3rd	Lost in first round
2016	4-10	5th	Did not qualify
2017	3-11	5th	Did not qualify
2018	5-9	4th	Did not qualify
2019	7-5	3rd	Lost in first round
2020	-	-	Season cancelled due to the COVID-19 pandemic.
2021	10-2	1st	Lost in semifinals
2022	11-1	1st	Lost in championship game
2023	6-6	3rd	Lost in first round
2024	7-5	3rd	Lost in first round
2025	12-0	1st	Lost in divisional finals
2026	1-10^{a}	5th	Did not qualify

^a The final game of the season vs. the Pittsburgh Thunderbirds was cancelled due to air quality concerns, stemming from the 2026 Canadian wildfires.

== Stats and records ==
=== All-time leaders ===
- Goals: 203 goals - AJ Nelson
- Assists: 457 assists - Pawel Janas
- Blocks: 68 blocks - Jonathan Helton
- Completions: 4,469 completions - Pawel Janas
- Points Played: 2,702 points played - Pawel Janas

=== Single season leaders ===
- Goals: 88 goals - AJ Nelson (2013)
- Assists: 97 assists - Pawel Janas (2018)
- Blocks: 42 blocks - Jonathan Helton (2013)
- Completions: 933 completions - Pawel Janas (2017)
- Points Played: 397 points played - Pawel Janas(2017)

== Chicago Union Cares ==
Chicago Union Cares is a 501(c)(3) non-profit organization established by the Chicago Union organization in 2024. Its mission is to inspire youth to reach their full potential through the power of ultimate frisbee. Chicago Union Cares focuses on inclusivity and aims to bring the joy of ultimate frisbee to underserved communities, supporting efforts to make ultimate an IHSA sport and eventually an Olympic sport. The non-profit is led by experienced professionals and works closely with schools and community-based organizations to extend its reach and impact.
