= Philadelphia Phoenix (UFA) =

Ultimate team in the Ultimate Frisbee Association

- Nickname: Hotbirds
- Sport: Ultimate
- Founded: 2013
- League: Ultimate Frisbee Association (UFA)
- Division: East (2013–2019); Atlantic (2020–2021); East (2022–present)
- Based in: Philadelphia, Pennsylvania
- Stadium: A.A. Garthwaite Stadium (2013–2019); South Philadelphia Supersite (2020–2022); James J. Ramp Memorial Athletic Complex (2023); Neumann University (2024-present)
- Colors: Scarlet, Vermilion and White
- Head Coach: Adam Callaghan
- Assistant Coach: Tom Glass
- Website: watchufa.com/phoenix

The Philadelphia Phoenix are a professional ultimate team based in the Philadelphia metropolitan area. The Phoenix compete in the Ultimate Frisbee Association (UFA) as a member of the East Division. The team is Philadelphia's only professional ultimate franchise and one of the original founding members of the league. The team's home field is located on the campus of Neumann University.

== History ==
When the American Ultimate Disc League was established, the Philadelphia Spinners began as one of the eight founding teams, winning the first AUDL championship on August 11, 2012. However, two months later, team owner, coach, and general manager Jeff Snader announced his intentions to withdraw from the AUDL and create a competing league, known as Major League Ultimate. An agreement was reached between Snader and the AUDL, allowing him to maintain ownership of the Spinners' name and logo. Just a few weeks after Major League Ultimate was announced, the Philadelphia Phoenix were announced as a replacement for the Spinners for the 2013 season, though the league's official records include the Spinners' 2012 season as part of the Phoenix's history.

The team played its early home games at A.A. Garthwaite Stadium in Conshohocken, Pennsylvania. In 2021, the Phoenix moved their home games to the South Philadelphia Super Site, directly across the street from the city's major sports stadiums, playing in front of their largest home crowds to that point. In 2024, the Phoenix began playing their home games at Neumann University, as part of a partnership that also includes internships for students and free ultimate clinics for the campus community.

In the 2022 season, the Phoenix made the playoffs for only the second time in franchise history, finishing 6–6 in the East Division. The run ended a nine-year postseason drought dating back to 2013.

== Ownership and community ==
The Phoenix are owned and operated by Christina Lee Chung, MD, FAAD, making the team one of the few professional sports franchises in the Philadelphia area with a woman majority owner. Chung was recognized by Main Line Today as a "Woman on the Move" in 2019.

The team runs a community outreach initiative called "Pass the Disc," which partners with local recreation centers to offer free ultimate clinics and equipment to youth in underserved communities. The Phoenix also draw heavily from the local player pipeline developed through the Philadelphia Area Disc Alliance (PADA), with most roster members coming from the greater Philadelphia region.

== Culture and notable moments ==
The Phoenix's mascot is named Birdy McBirdface, chosen via an internet fan vote in 2024. The name, a riff on the viral "Boaty McBoatface" naming trend, was deliberately included as a ballot option by team investors, who anticipated and welcomed the outcome.

In October 2023, during the Philadelphia Phillies' run in the 2023 National League Championship Series, the Phoenix temporarily rebranded as the "Philadelphia Gators" in solidarity with the Phillies, who were facing the Arizona Diamondbacks — based in Phoenix, Arizona. The name "Gators" was also a nod to a well-known incident in which the Phillies denied entry to a fan's emotional support alligator at Citizens Bank Park.

== Record ==
| Year | Division | Record | Win% | Playoffs | Goals | Goals Against | Finish |
|---|---|---|---|---|---|---|---|
| 2013 | East | 9-7 (3rd) | 0.563 | 0–1 | 376 | 373 | Lost in divisional semifinal |
| 2014 | East | 2-12 (5th) | 0.143 | | 247 | 335 | Did not make playoffs |
| 2015 | East | 1-13 (6th) | 0.071 | | 257 | 346 | Did not make playoffs |
| 2016 | East | 0-14 (6th) | 0.000 | | 221 | 388 | Did not make playoffs |
| 2017 | East | 4-10 (5th) | 0.286 | | 301 | 343 | Did not make playoffs |
| 2018 | East | 5-8-1 (5th) | 0.286 | | 293 | 318 | Did not make playoffs |
| 2019 | East | 8-4 (2nd) | 0.667 | | 259 | 227 | Did not make playoffs |
| 2021 | Atlantic | 3-9 (6th) | 0.250 | | 217 | 257 | Did not make playoffs |
| 2022 | East | 6-6 (3rd) | 0.500 | 0-1 | 254 | 244 | Lost in divisional semifinals |
| 2023 | East | 6-6 (4th) | 0.500 | | 229 | 219 | Did not make playoffs |
| 2024 | East | 5-7 (4th) | 0.417 | | 209 | 232 | Did not make playoffs |
| 2025 | East | 6-6 (4th) | 0.500 | | 217 | 232 | Did not make playoffs |
| Total | | 51-106-1 | 0.323 | 0-2 | 3,043 | 3,536 | |
