= Los Angeles Aviators =

Professional Ultimate frisbee team in Los Angeles, United States

- Sport: Ultimate frisbee
- Founded: 2014
- Disbanded: 2025
- League: Ultimate Frisbee Association
- Division: West, South
- Based in: Irvine, California
- Stadium: Great Park Championship Stadium
- Head Coach: Jacob Baumer
- Playoff berths: 3
- Website: www.laaviators.com

The Los Angeles Aviators were a professional ultimate team based in the Greater Los Angeles area. The Aviators competed in the Ultimate Frisbee Association (UFA) as a member of the West Division. The team played their first season in 2015. They suspended operations on November 12, 2025.

== History ==
The American Ultimate Disc League formally announced the Aviators as an expansion team in October 2014, to compete in the West Division for the 2015 season. During the ensuing offseason, the Aviators signed much of the LA talent pool, as well as luring some players from the San Jose Spiders.

The Aviators earned their first AUDL playoff berth in 2016, and advanced again the following season. In 2018, the Aviators advanced to AUDL Championship Weekend.
