= Detroit Mechanix =

American professional ultimate frisbee team

- Full name: Detroit Mechanix
- Sport: Ultimate frisbee
- Founded: 2010
- First season: 2012
- Disbanded: 2025
- League: Ultimate Frisbee Association
- Division: Central
- Based in: Detroit
- Stadium: No Home Stadium
- Colors
- Owner: Brent Steepe
- Head coach: Brent Steepe
- Mascot: Rusty the Wrench
- Website: watchufa.com/mechanix

The Detroit Mechanix was a professional ultimate team based in the Detroit metropolitan area. The Mechanix competed in the Ultimate Frisbee Association (UFA) as a member of the Central Division from the leagues inception until 2025. The Mechanix, owned by Brent Steepe and was founded in 2010, began play in 2012 as one of the eight charter teams of the league, and left the league on November 12, 2025.

== Club history and losing streak ==
The Mechanix suffered what is believed to be the longest losing streak in the history of professional sports: 81 games in a row, stretching over a seven-year period, from April 29, 2017 to June 22, 2024. On that day, the Mechanix defeated the Pittsburgh Thunderbirds, 26-15; it was their only victory of 2024.

The Mechanix all-time regular season record was a woeful 18-156 (.103), and the team went winless seven times in their thirteen-year history. After a decent 7-9 record in their inaugural season in 2012, Detroit managed only a 4-12 mark in 2013, then suffered back-to-back 0-14 seasons in 2014-15. The club managed to record four victories in 2016, but tumbled to 1-13 in 2017—and that lone win would be their last for quite a while, as Detroit would log five straight winless seasons. In what would be their final campaign in 2025, Detroit managed another win against Pittsburgh, downing them, 21-20 at Highmark Stadium; it would be their only win that season, as they would finish 1-11. The Mechanix would finish last overall in points per game in nine of their thirteen seasons, and last in their division twelve times (every year except 2016). The team's losing streak was featured in a CBS News "On the Road with Steve Hartman," with video from an away match in Madison, Wisconsin. https://www.cbsnews.com/news/detroit-mechanix-ultimate-frisbee-7-season-losing-streak/

=== Fatal accident ===
The 2020 AUDL season was cancelled due to the COVID-19 pandemic, but the hapless Mechanix would suffer an even worse tragedy: on February 29, 2020, three members of the team—Kevin Coulter, Drew Piet, and Michael Cannon—were killed in a multi-car accident on Interstate 96 on their way to a team practice. Piet and Coulter played for the Mechanix during the 2019 season, while Cannon was practicing with the team. Police and news outlets reported that the players’ vehicle was stopped in traffic due to a separate single-vehicle rollover accident when a speeding driver failed to slow down and collided with theirs and several other vehicles.

Since 2021, the Mechanix played their home games at Grand Rapids Christian High School in Grand Rapids, Michigan, some 150 miles from Detroit. (The club had never actually played in the Motor City: the Pontiac Silverdome was home to the team in 2012, then the Mechanix played at Ultimate Soccer Arenas in Pontiac from 2013–15, then at Bishop Foley Catholic High School in Madison Heights from 2016-20.)

== Withdrawal from the UFA ==
On November 12, 2025, the Detroit Mechanix announced their withdrawal from the UFA. The team has yet to release a formal statement on future endeavors.

== Players and staff ==
=== 2024 roster ===
#	Name
2	Joseph Sogno
3	Nathan Ploeger
6	Gregory Moreno
9	Aaron Richards
10	Mario Moran
11	Justin Wollin
12	Carson Chamberlain
13	James Kloss
14	Jake Felton
17	Jack Bembenek
19	Quinn Garner
21	Nic Lanas
22	Marco Dewey
23	Mauricio Galeano
24	Brendan Gessner
26	Tyler Shanahan
27	Jordan Hill
28	Richard Ware
31	Bradley Kennis
32	Elliot Davis
33	Terry Gaither
37	Joseph Simpson
40	Ryan Smith
42	Sean McGuinness
44	Anderson Cañon
45	Aiden Rudy
47	Christopher O'Brien
64	Stephen Grondin
76	Conrad Nguyen
78	Matthew Bell
81	Colin Beauregard
86	Nicholas Akers
94	Noah Sawyer
96	Caleb Texeira

=== International players ===
#	Name	Years	Nation
41	Dave Hochhalter	2012–2013	(Canada)
30	Marc Michael Huber	2013	(Austria)
91	Bjarne Laursen	2014	(Denmark)
99	Takashi Sato	2015	(Japan)
17	Wasdi Grimaldo B.	2015–2019	(Colombia)
68	Eugene Lim	2016	(Canada)
40	Ben Cheer	2019	(Canada)
21	Kevin van Roosmalen	2022	(Netherlands)

== Player records ==
To the 2021 season.

=== Games played ===
#	Name	Games	Years	Nation
4	Andrew Lucarotti	63	2012–2017	(United States)
13	Ben Murphy	62	2012–2017	(United States)
33	Eric Hubbard	60	2013–2017	(United States)
6	Danny Hunt	49	2013–2015, 2017	(United States)
8	Aaron del Real	47	2012,2014–2017	(United States)

=== Points played ===
#	Name	Points	Years	Nation
33	Eric Hubbard	1418	2013–2017	(United States)
4	Andrew Lucarotti	1240	2012–2017	(United States)
13	Ben Murphy	1142	2012–2017	(United States)
8	Aaron del Real	942	2012,2014–2017	(United States)
6	Danny Hunt	848	2013–2015, 2017	(United States)

=== Goals scored ===
#	Name	Goals	Years	Nation
33	Eric Hubbard	141	2013–2017	(United States)
8	Aaron del Real	83	2012,2014–2017	(United States)
83	Mark Worsfold	63	2012–2013	(United States)
11	Anthony Davis	57	2016–2017	(United States)
12	Ben Ayres	53	2012–2013	(United States)

=== Assists ===
#	Name	Assists	Years	Nation
4	Andrew Lucarotti	100	2012–2017	(United States)
41	Dave Hochhalter	94	2012–2014	(Canada)
35	Joseph Besser	58	2014–2016	(United States)
98	Dan Donovan	53	2016–2017	(United States)
8	Aaron del Real	52	2012,2014–2017	(United States)

=== Blocks ===
#	Name	Blocks	Years	Nation
33	Eric Hubbard	77	2013–2017	(United States)
23	Andy Barnhart	47	2012–2014	(United States)
42	Nathan Champoux	38	2016–2017	(United States)
4	Andrew Lucarotti	31	2012–2017	(United States)
8	Aaron del Real	28	2012,2014–2017	(United States)

== Record ==
Year	Division	Record	Win%	Playoffs	Goals	Goals Against	Finish
2012	Western	7-9 (T-3rd)	0.438	DNQ	337	351	Did not make playoffs
2013	Midwest	4-12 (6th)	0.250	DNQ	290	371	Did not make playoffs
2014	Midwest	0-14 (6th)	0.000	DNQ	217	380	Did not make playoffs
2015	Midwest	0-14 (7th)	0.000	DNQ	234	444	Did not make playoffs
2016	Midwest	4-10 (6th)	0.286	DNQ	257	337	Did not make playoffs
2017	Midwest	1-13 (6th)	0.071	DNQ	241	333	Did not make playoffs
2018	Midwest	0-14 (6th)	0.000	DNQ	235	423	Did not make playoffs
2019	Midwest	0-12 (6th)	0.000	DNQ	174	277	Did not make playoffs
2021	Central	0-12 (5th)	0.000	DNQ	187	322	Did not make playoffs
2022	Central	0-12 (6th)	0.000	DNQ	214	325	Did not make playoffs
2023	Central	0-12 (6th)	0.000	DNQ	187	279	Did not make playoffs
2024	Central	1-11 (6th)	0.083	DNQ	189	301	Did not make playoffs
2025	Central	1-11 (6th)	0.083	DNQ	188	328	Did not make playoffs
Total	-	18-156	0.102	0-0	2,950	4,471	-
