= Oregon Steel =

American ultimate team

- Sport: Ultimate frisbee
- Founded: 2022
- League: Ultimate Frisbee Association
- Division: West
- Location: Portland, Oregon
- Stadium: University of Oregon - Portland Stadium
- Website: watchufa.com/league/steel

The Oregon Steel are a professional ultimate team based in Portland, Oregon. The Steel compete in the Ultimate Frisbee Association (UFA) as a member of the West Division. The team plays its home games at the NE Complex at the University of Oregon - Portland. Their first season (as the Portland Nitro) was in 2022, and they rebranded as the Steel, in honor of Oregon's steelhead trout, after the 2024 season.

== See also ==
- Portland Stags – played in the now defunct Major League Ultimate league from 2013 to 2016
