= Oakland Spiders =

Ultimate team from California, US

- Sport: Ultimate frisbee
- Founded: 2014
- League: Ultimate Frisbee Association
- Division: West
- Based in: Oakland, California
- Stadium: Fremont High School
- Head Coach: Liam Kreiss
- General manager: Robin Vickers Batzdorf
- Captain: Leo Gordon, Evan Magsig
- Championships: 3 (2014, 2015, 2026)
- Division titles: 3 (2014, 2015, 2026)
- Playoff berths: 6 (2014, 2015, 2017, 2024, 2025, 2026)
- Website: oaklandspiders.com

The Oakland Spiders are a professional ultimate team based in Oakland, California. The Spiders compete in the Ultimate Frisbee Association (UFA) as a member of the West Division. The team was founded as the San Jose Spiders in 2014 when the league expanded to the West Coast, and played under that name until moving to Oakland in 2022. The Spiders won the National Championship in their first season and became the first team in the league's history to win consecutive titles when they defeated the Madison Radicals in the 2015 championship game.

== History ==
On October 25, 2013, San Jose was announced as one of six expansion cities for the 2014 AUDL season. Under the leadership of owner and general manager Andrew Zill, the Spiders' signed several notable players, most notably Beau Kittredge from the San Francisco Dogfish of Major League Ultimate. The team was very successful in its early years, winning the AUDL championship in its first two seasons.

The team was brought back to playoff contention in the rebranded UFA under Head Coaches Dan Silverstein and Nancy Freitas in 2024. The Spiders have focused considerable resources to create a winning culture on and off the field. The team also performs various volunteering and community service in and around their home town of Oakland as a core culture activity for players and staff. The team has gone through two General Managers since their move to Oakland.

In 2026 the Oakland Spiders returned to the top of the UFA mountain with an exceptional Championship Weekend performance.
