= 2025 Ultimate Frisbee Association season =

- League: Ultimate Frisbee Association
- Sport: Ultimate
- Duration: April 24 – August 23, 2025
- Teams: 24

Regular season
- Season MVP: Tobe Decraene (BOS)

Postseason
- East Division champions: Boston Glory
- Central Division champions: Minnesota Wind Chill
- West Division champions: Salt Lake Shred
- South Division champions: Atlanta Hustle
- Postseason MVP: Tobe Decraene (BOS)

Finals
- Champions: Boston Glory
- Runners-up: Minnesota Wind Chill

UFA seasons
- ← 2024 2026 →

The 2025 Ultimate Frisbee Association season was the league's thirteenth season, and the second after rebranding as the Ultimate Frisbee Association. It began on April 24, 2025, and ended with Championship Weekend on August 23, 2025. The Boston Glory won the championship, the team's first, defeating the prior year's champion Minnesota Wind Chill. Boston's Tobe Decraene won both the league's MVP award as well as the Championship Weekend MVP award.

Games were broadcast on the league's own streaming platform, WatchUFA.tv; "Friday Night Frisbee" featured one game per week broadcast for free on YouTube.

== Preseason ==
The 2025 season was marked by an influx of international talent to the league, including Rookie of the Year Daan De Marrée from Belgium. There were also a number of high-profile free agent signings that saw marquee players change teams before the 2025 season.

The Dallas Legion suspended operations following the 2024 season. The Vegas Bighorns joined the league's West Division for 2025, and in order to make room, the Los Angeles Aviators and San Diego Growlers moved into the South Division. The Portland Nitro rebranded as the Oregon Steel.

== Regular Season ==
=== Week 1 ===
Date	Home	Goals	Goals	Away
4/24	Oakland Spiders	22	17	New York Empire
4/25	Houston Havoc	23	30	Austin Sol
4/25	Vegas Bighorns	13	32	New York Empire
4/26	Atlanta Hustle	23	21	Salt Lake Shred
4/26	DC Breeze	15	16	Philadelphia Phoenix
4/26	Colorado Apex	24	12	Oregon Steel
4/26	Boston Glory	26	18	Montreal Royal

=== Week 2 ===
Date	Home	Goals	Goals	Away
5/2	Houston Havoc	10	12	Madison Radicals
5/2	Pittsburgh Thunderbirds	25	21	Indianapolis AlleyCats
5/3	Austin Sol	22	17	Madison Radicals
5/3	DC Breeze	19	18	Toronto Rush
5/3	Salt Lake Shred	22	12	Vegas Bighorns
5/3	San Diego Growlers	19	12	Los Angeles Aviators
5/3	Seattle Cascades	21	22	Oakland Spiders
5/4	Philadelphia Phoenix	19	16	Toronto Rush
5/4	Los Angeles Aviators	16	25	San Diego Growlers
5/4	Oregon Steel	13	28	Oakland Spiders

=== Week 3 ===
Date	Home	Goals	Goals	Away
5/9	New York Empire	22	20	Montreal Royal
5/9	San Diego Growlers	19	20	Atlanta Hustle
5/9	Oakland Spiders	26	21	Seattle Cascades
5/10	Austin Sol	28	19	Houston Havoc
5/10	Boston Glory	17	11	Montreal Royal
5/10	Vegas Bighorns	13	23	Seattle Cascades
5/10	Carolina Flyers	18	20	DC Breeze
5/10	Indianapolis AlleyCats	17	32	Minnesota Wind Chill
5/10	Los Angeles Aviators	18	26	Atlanta Hustle
5/10	Toronto Rush	21	24	Philadelphia Phoenix
5/11	Detroit Mechanix	17	22	Pittsburgh Thunderbirds

=== Week 4 ===
Date	Home	Goals	Goals	Away
5/16	Houston Havoc	23	17	Colorado Apex
5/16	Boston Glory	19	18	New York Empire
5/16	San Diego Growlers	21	16	Los Angeles Aviators
5/17	Atlanta Hustle	22	18	Carolina Flyers
5/17	Austin Sol	18	16	Colorado Apex
5/17	Madison Radicals	20	14	Pittsburgh Thunderbirds
5/17	Minnesota Wind Chill	11	16	Chicago Union
5/17	Montreal Royal	24	23	New York Empire
5/17	Oregon Steel	20	19	Seattle Cascades
5/17	Atlanta Hustle	19	15	Carolina Flyers
5/18	DC Breeze	11	14	Boston Glory

=== Week 5 ===
Date	Home	Goals	Goals	Away
5/23	Salt Lake Shred	22	21	Seattle Cascades
5/23	Carolina Flyers	25	26	San Diego Growlers
5/23	Vegas Bighorns	13	14	Oregon Steel
5/23	Philadelphia Phoenix	16	17	New York Empire
5/24	Atlanta Hustle	23	19	San Diego Growlers
5/24	Colorado Apex	24	14	Oregon Steel
5/24	Indianapolis AlleyCats	21	18	Detroit Mechanix
5/24	Pittsburgh Thunderbirds	14	31	Minnesota Wind Chill
5/24	Oakland Spiders	21	16	Seattle Cascades

=== Week 6 ===
Date	Home	Goals	Goals	Away
5/30	Colorado Apex	24	21	Oakland Spiders
5/30	Los Angeles Aviators	20	19	Houston Havoc
5/30	Madison Radicals	22	11	Indianapolis AlleyCats
5/30	Minnesota Wind Chill	17	15	Atlanta Hustle
5/30	Seattle Cascades	20	25	Salt Lake Shred
5/30	Toronto Rush	20	21	DC Breeze
5/31	San Diego Growlers	25	17	Houston Havoc
5/31	Chicago Union	19	18	Atlanta Hustle
5/31	Montreal Royal	22	17	DC Breeze
5/31	Oregon Steel	17	21	Salt Lake Shred
5/31	Philadelphia Phoenix	15	18	Carolina Flyers
6/1	Pittsburgh Thunderbirds	12	24	Carolina Flyers
6/1	Toronto Rush	22	20	New York Empire

=== Week 7 ===
Date	Home	Goals	Goals	Away
6/6	DC Breeze	23	15	New York Empire
6/6	Los Angeles Aviators	17	18	Austin Sol
6/6	Montreal Royal	29	20	Philadelphia Phoenix
6/6	Seattle Cascades	23	12	Vegas Bighorns
6/6	Oakland Spiders	24	25	Salt Lake Shred
6/7	Detroit Mechanix	16	25	Indianapolis AlleyCats
6/7	Boston Glory	22	14	Philadelphia Phoenix
6/7	Carolina Flyers	21	19	Atlanta Hustle
6/7	San Diego Growlers	21	23	Austin Sol
6/7	Minnesota Wind Chill	21	16	Pittsburgh Thunderbirds
6/7	Oregon Steel	21	17	Vegas Bighorns
6/7	Toronto Rush	28	18	Montreal Royal
6/8	Chicago Union	21	16	Madison Radicals

=== Week 8 ===
Date	Home	Goals	Goals	Away
6/13	Madison Radicals	16	22	Minnesota Wind Chill
6/13	Salt Lake Shred	31	19	Oregon Steel
6/14	Austin Sol	20	18	Houston Havoc
6/14	Vegas Bighorns	16	23	San Diego Growlers
6/14	New York Empire	19	18	DC Breeze
6/14	Indianapolis AlleyCats	14	26	Chicago Union
6/14	Pittsburgh Thunderbirds	16	25	Philadelphia Phoenix
6/14	Detroit Mechanix	20	31	Madison Radicals
6/14	Oakland Spiders	25	9	Oregon Steel
6/14	Montreal Royal	15	16	Boston Glory
6/15	Toronto Rush	23	26	Boston Glory

=== Week 9 ===
Date	Home	Goals	Goals	Away
6/20	Carolina Flyers	28	14	Houston Havoc
6/20	Colorado Apex	26	10	Vegas Bighorns
6/20	New York Empire	23	19	Toronto Rush
6/20	Oregon Steel	19	20	Los Angeles Aviators
6/20	Chicago Union	28	14	Pittsburgh Thunderbirds
6/21	Atlanta Hustle	28	17	Houston Havoc
6/21	Minnesota Wind Chill	31	14	Indianapolis AlleyCats
6/21	Boston Glory	23	13	Toronto Rush
6/21	Detroit Mechanix	10	28	Chicago Union
6/21	Seattle Cascades	20	15	Los Angeles Aviators
6/21	Oakland Spiders	32	10	Vegas Bighorns
6/22	Pittsburgh Thunderbirds	20	21	Detroit Mechanix

=== Week 10 ===
Date	Home	Goals	Goals	Away
6/27	Atlanta Hustle	14	9	Austin Sol
6/27	DC Breeze	26	14	Montreal Royal
6/27	Madison Radicals	29	19	Detroit Mechanix
6/27	Seattle Cascades	22	24	Colorado Apex
6/27	Salt Lake Shred	25	21	Oakland Spiders
6/27	Chicago Union	22	12	Indianapolis AlleyCats
6/28	Carolina Flyers	26	21	Austin Sol
6/28	San Diego Growlers	16	21	Oakland Spiders
6/28	Indianapolis AlleyCats	19	24	Madison Radicals
6/28	Oregon Steel	18	19	Colorado Apex
6/28	Philadelphia Phoenix	20	19	Montreal Royal
6/28	Toronto Rush	18	19	Pittsburgh Thunderbirds
6/28	Detroit Mechanix	10	28	Chicago Union

=== Week 11 ===
Date	Home	Goals	Goals	Away
7/4	Colorado Apex	18	24	Salt Lake Shred
7/4	Montreal Royal	18	21	Toronto Rush
7/4	Chicago Union	25	15	Minnesota Wind Chill
7/5	Houston Havoc	20	29	Austin Sol
7/5	Vegas Bighorns	11	32	Salt Lake Shred
7/5	Los Angeles Aviators	19	21	San Diego Growlers
7/5	Madison Radicals	28	12	Indianapolis AlleyCats
7/5	Pittsburgh Thunderbirds	19	21	Chicago Union
7/5	Detroit Mechanix	14	25	Minnesota Wind Chill
7/6	Boston Glory	16	17	DC Breeze

Boston's loss to DC left Chicago as the only remaining undefeated team in the league.

=== Week 12 ===
Date	Home	Goals	Goals	Away
7/11	Houston Havoc	22	20	Los Angeles Aviators
7/11	Philadelphia Phoenix	14	15	Boston Glory
7/11	Salt Lake Shred	21	18	Colorado Apex
7/12	Austin Sol	20	13	Los Angeles Aviators
7/12	Carolina Flyers	17	21	Atlanta Hustle
7/12	DC Breeze	20	16	Boston Glory
7/12	Vegas Bighorns	13	33	Colorado Apex
7/12	Indianapolis AlleyCats	25	18	Detroit Mechanix
7/12	Minnesota Wind Chill	16	13	Madison Radicals
7/13	New York Empire	24	16	Philadelphia Phoenix

=== Week 13 ===
Date	Home	Goals	Goals	Away
7/18	Austin Sol	19	24	Carolina Flyers
7/18	Colorado Apex	24	15	Seattle Cascades
7/18	Salt Lake Shred	22	18	Minnesota Wind Chill
7/19	Houston Havoc	21	25	Carolina Flyers
7/19	Chicago Union	39	14	Detroit Mechanix
7/19	Indianapolis AlleyCats	25	18	Pittsburgh Thunderbirds
7/19	New York Empire	22	21	Boston Glory
7/19	Philadelphia Phoenix	24	15	DC Breeze
7/19	Seattle Cascades	26	17	Oregon Steel
7/19	Oakland Spiders	17	14	San Diego Growlers
7/19	Montreal Royal	23	16	Toronto Rush
7/20	Madison Radicals	18	24	Chicago Union
7/20	Minnesota Wind Chill	35	11	Detroit Mechanix
7/20	Los Angeles Aviators	18	15	Vegas Bighorns

== Standings ==
With a balanced schedule, each division sent three teams to the playoffs. The top seed received a bye through to the second round, while the second and third-placed teams played each other in the first round.

Ties between teams with equal win/loss records were broken by head-to-head record.

=== West Division ===
Team	W	L	GD	Qualification
Salt Lake Shred	11	1	+69	First round bye
Oakland Spiders	9	3	+69	Playoffs
Colorado Summit	8	4	+56	Playoffs
Seattle Cascades	4	8	+6	
Oregon Steel	3	9	-74	
Vegas Bighorns	0	12	-144	

=== South Division ===
Team	W	L	GD	Qualification
Atlanta Hustle	9	3	+38	First round bye
Austin Sol	9	3	+29	Playoffs
San Diego Growlers	7	5	+24	Playoffs
Carolina Flyers	7	5	+30	
Los Angeles Aviators	3	9	-41	
Houston Havoc	2	10	-59	

=== Central Division ===
Team	W	L	GD	Qualification
Chicago Union	12	0	+126	First round bye
Minnesota Wind Chill	9	3	+81	Playoffs
Madison Radicals	7	5	+36	Playoffs
Indianapolis AlleyCats	4	8	-64	
Pittsburgh Thunderbirds	3	9	-63	
Detroit Mechanix	1	11	-140	

=== East Division ===
Team	W	L	GD	Qualification
Boston Glory	9	3	+35	First round bye
DC Breeze	7	5	+10	Playoffs
New York Empire	7	5	+19	Playoffs
Philadelphia Phoenix	6	6	-4	
Montreal Royal	4	8	-21	
Toronto Rush	3	9	-18	

== Postseason ==
The first round of the playoffs, with games hosted by the #2 seed in each division, was contested on 26 July. The Division Championship games were hosted by the #1 seed and played on the weekend of 8–9 August. Championship Weekend, where the semi-final and finals were played, was held in Madison, Wisconsin at Breese Stevens Field on the weekend of 28–29 August.

First Round; 26 July
2	Minnesota Wind Chill	22
3	Madison Radicals	16
2	Austin Sol	19
3	San Diego Growlers	25
2	DC Breeze	23
3	New York Empire	12
2	Oakland Spiders	23
3	Colorado Summit	14

Division Championships; 8–9 August
1	Chicago Union	17
2	Minnesota Wind Chill	19
1	Atlanta Hustle	22
3	San Diego Growlers	18
1	Boston Glory	17
2	DC Breeze	9
1	Salt Lake Shred	18
2	Oakland Spiders	17

Semi-Finals; 28 August
Minnesota Wind Chill	23
Atlanta Hustle	21
Boston Glory	21
Salt Lake Shred	17

Final; 29 August
Minnesota Wind Chill	15
Boston Glory	17

Instead of a third-place game, Championship Weekend featured an all-star game featuring a team of players from the Western Ultimate League against a team of players from the Premier Ultimate League. The Premier league all-stars won the game, 15–9.

== Season Awards ==
Award	Winner	Runners-up
Most Valuable Player	Tobe Decraene (BOS)	Daan De Marrée (CHI), Jeff Babbitt (BOS)
Rookie of the Year	Daan De Marrée^{*} (CHI)	Adam Rees (OAK), Leo Gordon (OAK)
Defensive Player of the Year	Tannor Johnson-Go (BOS)	Justin Burnett (MIN), Jeff Babbitt (BOS)
Coach of the Year	Bryce Merrill^{*} (SLC)	Ben Feldman (MIN), Tuba Benson-Jaja (ATL)
Most Improved Player	Mark Henke (ATX)	Matt LaBar (NY)

*: indicates a unanimous selection

=== Individual Leaders ===
Category	Number	Leader(s)
Assists	69	Allan Laviolette (CAR)
Goals	56	Anthony Gutowsky (MAD)
Blocks	24	Jeff Babbitt (BOS), Noah Coolman (COL)
Scores	91	Tobe Decraene (BOS)
Receiving Yards	4272	Tobe Decraene (BOS)
Throwing Yards	5381	Austin Taylor (ATL)
Total Yards	7753	Austin Taylor (ATL)
Completions	689	Evan Magsig (OAK)
Points Played	325	Tristan Van de Moortele (MIN)

=== All-UFA Teams ===
First Team

- Jeff Babbitt (BOS)
- Daan De Marrée (CHI)
- Tobe Decraene (BOS)
- Walker Frankenberg (OAK)
- Allan Laviolette (CAR)
- John Randolph (NY)
- Austin Taylor (ATL)

Second Team

- Travis Dunn (SD)
- Anthony Gutowsky (MAD)
- Brett Hulsmeyer (ATL)
- Tannor Johnson-Go (BOS)
- Jordan Kerr (SLC)
- Adam Miller (ATL)
- Chad Yorgason (SLC)

Third Team

- Will Brandt (MIN)
- Mark Henke (ATX)
- Ben Jagt (NY)
- Evan Magsig (OAK)
- Garrett Martin (SEA)
- Adam Rees (OAK)
- McKay Yorgason (SLC)

=== All-Rookie Teams ===
First Team

- Tom Blasman (TOR)
- Daan De Marrée (CHI)
- Leo Gordon (OAK)
- Sam Grossberg (PHI)
- Arvids Karklins (TOR)
- Jonathan Lyle (LA)
- Adam Rees (OAK)

Second Team

- Carson Armstrong (ATX)
- Conor Belfield (SEA)
- Langley Fitzpatrick (SEA)
- Carter Lankford (OAK)
- John McDonnell (CAR)
- Kimball Pew (SLC)
- Saul Wildavsky (OAK)

=== All-Defense Teams ===
First Team

- Jeff Babbitt (BOS)
- Justin Burnett (MIN)
- Noal Coolman (COL)
- Tannor Johnson-Go (BOS)
- Noah Hanson (MIN)
- Lukas McClamrock (ATL)
- Will Wettengel (CHI)

Second Team

- Charles Guay (MTL)
- Carter Lankford (OAK)
- Nate Little (PHI)
- Luke Marks (MAD)
- Xavier Payne (CHI)
- Tyler Randall (ATL)
- Daniel Ritthaler (OAK)
