= 2021 American Ultimate Disc League season =

- League: American Ultimate Disc League
- Sport: Ultimate
- Duration: June 4 – September 11, 2021
- Teams: 22

Regular season
- Season MVP: Ben Jagt (NY) (2)

Postseason
- Canada Cup champions: Montreal Royal
- Atlantic Division champions: Raleigh Flyers
- Central Division champions: Chicago Union
- West Division champions: San Diego Growlers

Finals
- Champions: Raleigh Flyers
- Runners-up: New York Empire

UFA seasons
- ← 2019 2022 →

The 2021 American Ultimate Disc League season was the league's ninth, after the 2020 season was cancelled due to the COVID-19 pandemic. However, due to ongoing travel restrictions, the three Canadian teams were temporarily moved into their own division and only played each other in a separate competition known as the "Canada Cup". The Raleigh Flyers won their first league championship, defeating the prior season's champion New York Empire. New York's Ben Jagt won the league MVP award for the second consecutive season.

Most league games were streamed on the league's platform, AUDL.tv. The championship game was broadcast on FS1.

== Offseason ==
The Boston Glory were announced as an expansion franchise following the 2019 season, making 2021 their debut season. The Midwest division was renamed the Central, and the South and East divisions were combined to form the Atlantic.

== Regular season ==
=== Week 1 ===
Date	Home	Goals	Goals	Away
6/4	Indianapolis AlleyCats	30	21	Detroit Mechanix
6/4	Philadelphia Phoenix	21	16	Tampa Bay Cannons
6/4	Madison Radicals	18	20	Minnesota Wind Chill
6/4	New York Empire	19	18	DC Breeze
6/5	Atlanta Hustle	19	18	Raleigh Flyers
6/5	Chicago Union	20	12	Indianapolis AlleyCats
6/5	DC Breeze	24	10	Tampa Bay Cannons
6/5	Detroit Mechanix	10	34	Madison Radicals
6/5	Los Angeles Aviators	16	19	San Diego Growlers
6/5	Pittsburgh Thunderbirds	21	29	Boston Glory
6/5	Seattle Cascades	24	21	San Jose Spiders

=== Week 2 ===
Date	Home	Goals	Goals	Away
6/11	Boston Glory	19	21	Atlanta Hustle
6/12	Austin Sol	24	23	Dallas Roughnecks
6/12	Indianapolis AlleyCats	28	16	Detroit Mechanix
6/12	San Jose Spiders	20	19	Seattle Cascades
6/12	Tampa Bay Cannons	18	15	Pittsburgh Thunderbirds
6/12	Chicago Union	23	18	Minnesota Wind Chill
6/12	Raleigh Flyers	24	25	DC Breeze
6/13	San Diego Growlers	18	20	Los Angeles Aviators

=== Week 3 ===
Date	Home	Goals	Goals	Away
6/18	Dallas Roughnecks	20	12	Los Angeles Aviators
6/18	DC Breeze	32	20	Boston Glory
6/18	Minnesota Wind Chill	25	19	Madison Radicals
6/18	San Jose Spiders	16	23	San Diego Growlers
6/18	Pittsburgh Thunderbirds	19	24	New York Empire
6/19	Austin Sol	22	20	Los Angeles Aviators
6/19	Philadelphia Phoenix	27	18	Pittsburgh Thunderbirds
6/19	Tampa Bay Cannons	13	24	Atlanta Hustle
6/19	Detroit Mechanix	13	30	Chicago Union
6/19	Raleigh Flyers	27	24	Boston Glory
6/20	Madison Radicals	24	20	Indianapolis AlleyCats
6/20	Seattle Cascades	16	18	San Diego Growlers

=== Week 4 ===
Date	Home	Goals	Goals	Away
6/25	Seattle Cascades	28	24	Austin Sol
6/25	Boston Glory	24	17	Tampa Bay Cannons
6/25	Raleigh Flyers	23	11	Philadelphia Phoenix
6/25	Los Angeles Aviators	16	21	Dallas Roughnecks
6/26	Indianapolis AlleyCats	20	28	Chicago Union
6/26	Atlanta Hustle	24	17	Philadelphia Phoenix
6/26	New York Empire	24	18	Tampa Bay Cannons
6/26	San Diego Growlers	21	20	Dallas Roughnecks
6/26	San Jose Spiders	28	23	Austin Sol
6/26	Minnesota Wind Chill	29	17	Detroit Mechanix
6/27	Madison Radicals	29	18	Detroit Mechanix

=== Week 5 ===
Date	Home	Goals	Goals	Away
7/2	Austin Sol	23	16	Seattle Cascades
7/2	Chicago Union	18	15	Madison Radicals
7/2	DC Breeze	20	17	New York Empire
7/3	Dallas Roughnecks	24	16	Seattle Cascades
7/3	Indianapolis AlleyCats	22	26	Madison Radicals
7/3	Tampa Bay Cannons	15	29	Raleigh Flyers
7/3	Pittsburgh Thunderbirds	23	20	Philadelphia Phoenix

=== Week 6 ===
Date	Home	Goals	Goals	Away
7/9	Dallas Roughnecks	16	17	Austin Sol
7/9	New York Empire	27	20	Philadelphia Phoenix
7/10	Dallas Roughnecks	21	20	Austin Sol
7/10	Atlanta Hustle	14	19	DC Breeze
7/10	Boston Glory	22	23	Philadelphia Phoenix
7/10	Indianapolis AlleyCats	18	25	Minnesota Wind Chill
7/10	Madison Radicals	19	16	Chicago Union
7/10	Raleigh Flyers	31	19	Tampa Bay Cannons
7/11	Chicago Union	18	20	Minnesota Wind Chill

=== Week 7 ===
Date	Home	Goals	Goals	Away
7/16	Philadelphia Phoenix	15	20	Atlanta Hustle
7/16	Seattle Cascades	22	18	Dallas Roughnecks
7/17	San Jose Spiders	20	23	Dallas Roughnecks
7/17	DC Breeze	13	17	Atlanta Hustle
7/17	Los Angeles Aviators	20	21	Austin Sol
7/17	Madison Radicals	17	16	Indianapolis AlleyCats
7/17	Minnesota Wind Chill	25	12	Detroit Mechanix
7/17	Pittsburgh Thunderbirds	16	27	Raleigh Flyers
7/18	Chicago Union	24	18	Indianapolis AlleyCats
7/18	San Diego Growlers	21	20	Austin Sol

=== Week 8 ===
Date	Home	Goals	Goals	Away
7/23	Dallas Roughnecks	19	15	San Diego Growlers
7/23	Seattle Cascades	16	21	Los Angeles Aviators
7/24	Atlanta Hustle	22	21	New York Empire
7/24	Austin Sol	17	21	San Diego Growlers
7/24	San Jose Spiders	18	20	Los Angeles Aviators
7/24	Tampa Bay Cannons	23	26	Boston Glory
7/24	Detroit Mechanix	13	18	Indianapolis AlleyCats
7/24	Minnesota Wind Chill	16	20	Chicago Union
7/24	Ottawa Outlaws	27	24	Toronto Rush
7/25	Montreal Royal	19	26	Ottawa Outlaws

=== Week 9 ===
Date	Home	Goals	Goals	Away
7/30	Madison Radicals	18	23	Chicago Union
7/30	Raleigh Flyers	20	17	Pittsburgh Thunderbirds
7/31	Atlanta Hustle	27	22	Pittsburgh Thunderbirds
7/31	Austin Sol	25	15	San Jose Spiders
7/31	Tampa Bay Cannons	18	25	New York Empire
7/31	DC Breeze	22	12	Philadelphia Phoenix
7/31	Detroit Mechanix	15	23	Madison Radicals
7/31	Minnesota Wind Chill	17	16	Indianapolis AlleyCats
7/31	San Diego Growlers	21	20	Seattle Cascades
8/1	Dallas Roughnecks	15	14	San Jose Spiders
8/1	Los Angeles Aviators	20	15	Seattle Cascades

=== Week 10 ===
Date	Home	Goals	Goals	Away
8/6	Philadelphia Phoenix	13	20	DC Breeze
8/6	Boston Glory	18	19	Raleigh Flyers
8/7	Atlanta Hustle	20	21	Tampa Bay Cannons
8/7	Austin Sol	22	23	Dallas Roughnecks
8/7	New York Empire	24	23	Raleigh Flyers
8/7	Chicago Union	20	16	Detroit Mechanix
8/7	Montreal Royal	18	16	Toronto Rush
8/7	San Diego Growlers	24	17	Los Angeles Aviators
8/7	Seattle Cascades	15	23	San Jose Spiders
8/8	Pittsburgh Thunderbirds	16	25	DC Breeze
8/8	Ottawa Outlaws	18	22	Montreal Royal

=== Week 11 ===
Date	Home	Goals	Goals	Away
8/12	Montreal Royal	18	16	Ottawa Outlaws
8/13	Boston Glory	26	20	Pittsburgh Thunderbirds
8/13	Philadelphia Phoenix	19	20	New York Empire
8/13	San Jose Spiders	20	16	Seattle Cascades
8/14	New York Empire	20	16	Pittsburgh Thunderbirds
8/14	Detroit Mechanix	15	24	Minnesota Wind Chill
8/14	Los Angeles Aviators	17	21	San Diego Growlers
8/14	Raleigh Flyers	20	18	Atlanta Hustle
8/14	Toronto Rush	19	20	Montreal Royal
8/15	Indianapolis AlleyCats	19	23	Minnesota Wind Chill
8/15	Toronto Rush	23	21	Ottawa Outlaws

=== Week 12 ===
Date	Home	Goals	Goals	Away
8/20	New York Empire	25	21	Boston Glory
8/20	San Diego Growlers	24	21	San Jose Spiders
8/21	Philadelphia Phoenix	19	22	Boston Glory
8/21	DC Breeze	22	21	Raleigh Flyers
8/21	Detroit Mechanix	19	29	Chicago Union
8/21	Los Angeles Aviators	21	20	San Jose Spiders
8/21	Pittsburgh Thunderbirds	25	26	Atlanta Hustle
8/21	Montreal Royal	25	23	Toronto Rush
8/22	Minnesota Wind Chill	19	15	Madison Radicals
8/22	Ottawa Outlaws	25	24	Montreal Royal

=== Week 13 ===
Date	Home	Goals	Goals	Away
8/28	Toronto Rush	22	13	Ottawa Outlaws
8/28	San Diego Growlers	22	18	Dallas Roughnecks
8/29	Chicago Union	21	19	Minnesota Wind Chill
8/29	Tampa Bay Cannons	16	28	DC Breeze
8/29	Toronto Rush	18	25	Montreal Royal
8/29	Boston Glory	17	18	New York Empire

== Standings ==
The Atlantic division, having several more teams, was given four playoff berths; the other two American divisions were given two berths each. This provided for a standard eight-team knockout bracket where the first round would feature divisional opponents.

The Canadian Cup, being contested between three teams, had a first round game between the bottom two teams and a divisional championship where the first-place team played the winner of the first round game.

=== Atlantic ===
Team	W	L	%	GD	Qualification
DC Breeze	10	2	0.833	+69	Playoffs
New York Empire	10	2	0.833	+33	Playoffs
Atlanta Hustle	9	3	0.750	+29	Playoffs
Raleigh Flyers	8	4	0.667	+54	Playoffs
Boston Glory	5	7	0.417	+3	
Philadelphia Phoenix	3	9	0.250	-40	
Tampa Bay Cannons	2	10	0.167	-87	
Pittsburgh Thunderbirds	1	11	0.083	-61	

=== West ===
Team	W	L	%	GD	Qualification
San Diego Growlers	10	2	0.833	+27	Playoffs
Dallas Roughnecks	8	4	0.667	+24	Playoffs
Austin Sol	6	6	0.500	+6	
Los Angeles Aviators	5	7	0.417	-15	
San Jose Spiders	4	8	0.333	-12	

=== Central ===
Team	W	L	%	GD	Qualification
Chicago Union	10	2	0.833	+65	Playoffs
Minnesota Wind Chill	10	2	0.833	+51	Playoffs
Madison Radicals	7	5	0.583	+35	
Seattle Cascades	3	9	0.250	-30	
Indianapolis AlleyCats	3	9	0.250	-17	
Detroit Mechanix	0	12	0.000	-134	

=== Canadian ===
Team	W	L	%	GD	Qualification
Montreal Royal	6	2	0.750	+10	First round bye
Ottawa Outlaws	3	4	0.429	-6	Playoffs
Toronto Rush	2	5	0.286	-4	Playoffs

== Postseason ==
=== Canada Cup ===
Play-in game 4 Sep 2021			Final; 9 Sep 2021
			1	Montreal Royal	19
2	Ottawa Outlaws	22	3	Toronto Rush	18
3	Toronto Rush	24

=== AUDL ===
First Round; 3–4 Sep 2021
1	DC Breeze	16
4	Raleigh Flyers	19
1	Chicago Union	21
2	Minnesota Wind Chill	19
2	New York Empire (OT)	22
3	Atlanta Hustle	21
1	San Diego Growlers	22
2	Dallas Roughnecks	18

Semi-finals; 10 Sep 2021
4	Raleigh Flyers	21
1	Chicago Union	20
2	New York Empire	22
1	San Diego Growlers	18

Final; 11 Sep 2021
4	Raleigh Flyers	19
2	New York Empire	16

== Season Awards ==
- Most Valuable Player: Ben Jagt (NY)
- Defensive Player of the Year: AJ Merriman (ATL)
- Rookie of the Year: Anders Juengst (CAR)
- Most Improved Player: AJ Merriman (ATL)
- Coach of the Year: Mike DeNardis (RAL)

=== Individual Leaders ===
- Assists: 77, Ryan Osgar (NY)
- Goals: 63, Ben Jagt (NY)
- Blocks: 23, four players tied
- Scores: 118, Ben Jagt (NY)
- Receiving Yards: 5375, Ben Jagt (NY)
- Throwing Yards: 5260, Sol Yanuck (RAL)
- Total Yards: 7363, Ryan Osgar (NY)
- Completions: 723, Sol Yanuck (RAL)
- Points Played: 395, Ben Jagt (NY)

=== All-AUDL Teams ===
First Team

- Travis Dunn (SD)
- Ben Jagt (NY)
- Pawel Janas (CHI)
- AJ Merriman (DC)
- Ryan Osgar (NY)
- Austin Taylor (ATL)
- Jack Williams (NY)

Second Team

- Jeff Babbitt (NY)
- Allan Laviolette (CAR)
- Jonny Malks (DC)
- Greg Martin (PHL)
- Steven Milardovich (SD)
- Ben Sadok (BOS)
- Max Sheppard (PIT)

=== All-Rookie Teams ===
First Team

- Paul Arters (CHI)
- Tanner Halkyard (BOS)
- Anders Juengst (CAR)
- Jordan Kerr (OAK)
- Andrew Roy (MIN)
- Ben Sadok (BOS)
- Evan Swiatek (ATX)

Second Team

- Matt Gouchoe-Hanas (CAR)
- John Lithio (NY)
- Elijah Long (CAR)
- Garrett Martin (SEA)
- Gus Norrbom (DC)
- John Stubbs (ATL)
- Vinay Valsaraj (ATX)

=== All-UFA Defense Team ===
- Jeff Babbitt (NY)
- Dylan DeClerck (MIN)
- Brett Hulsmeyer (ATL)
- AJ Merriman (ATL)
- Steven Milardovich (SD)
- Drew Swanson (CHI)
- Mick Walter (ATX)
