= 2017 American Ultimate Disc League season =

- League: American Ultimate Disc League
- Sport: Ultimate
- Duration: April 1 – August 27, 2017
- Teams: 24
- TV partner: Eleven Sports Network

Regular season

Postseason
- East Division champions: Toronto Rush
- Midwest Division champions: Madison Radicals
- West Division champions: San Jose Spiders
- South Division champions: Raleigh Flyers

Finals
- Champions: San Francisco FlameThrowers

AUDL seasons
- ← 2016 2018 →

The 2017 American Ultimate Disc League season was the sixth season for the league. The San Francisco FlameThrowers won the championship, the team's first title. The league featured twenty-four teams in four divisions, and for the first time, teams played interdivisional games. Eleven Sports Network joined the league as a broadcast partner for the first time, broadcasting a limited slate of games.

== Regular season ==
=== Cross Coast Challenge ===
For the first time in the AUDL, cross-divisional games were held, counting towards the team's regular season record. Only the top two teams from each division in 2016 were involved in Cross Coast Challenge matches.

==== DC Breeze vs. Raleigh Flyers ====
April 22, 2017 East vs. South	DC Breeze	21–23(OT)	Raleigh Flyers	Raleigh, North Carolina
19:00	Scoring by quarter: 5–3, 7–6, 5–4, 3–7, Overtime: 1–3			Stadium: Cardinal Gibbons Stadium
19:00	Goals: E. Miner (4); Assists: A. Kolick (7); Blocks: Three players (2); Plus/minus: L. Blake (+5)	Stats	Goals: M. Bode (7); Assists: J. Nethercutt (6); Blocks: D. Richardson, H. Taylor (4); Plus/minus: D. Richardson, J. Nethercutt (+5)	Stadium: Cardinal Gibbons Stadium

==== Pittsburgh Thunderbirds vs. Seattle Cascades ====
May 6, 2017 Midwest vs. West	Pittsburgh Thunderbirds	24–26	Seattle Cascades	Seattle, Washington
21:00	Scoring by quarter: 5–7, 5–8, 6–5, 8–6			Stadium: Memorial Stadium
21:00	Goals: M. Fedorenko (7); Assists: P. Earles (10); Blocks: A. Reppermund (6); Plus/minus: P. Earles, M. Thorne (+8)	Stats	Goals: M. Burton, B. Houser (4); Assists: B. Houser (5); Blocks: M. Russell, W. Chen (3); Plus/minus: M. Burton (+9)	Stadium: Memorial Stadium

==== Dallas Roughnecks vs. Madison Radicals ====
June 3, 2017 South vs. Midwest	Dallas Roughnecks	23–17	Madison Radicals	Madison, Wisconsin
19:00	Scoring by quarter: 4–5, 4–5, 9–5, 6–2			Stadium: Breese Stevens Field
19:00	Goals: J. Mickle (4); Assists: A. Coffin (5); Blocks: J. Mickle (3); Plus/minus: A. Coffin (+7)	Stats	Goals: Four players (3); Assists: T. Annen (4); Blocks: S. Knoche, S. Richgels (2); Plus/minus: S. Knoche, T. Annen (+5)	Stadium: Breese Stevens Field

==== San Francisco FlameThrowers vs. Toronto Rush ====
June 17, 2017 West vs. East	San Francisco FlameThrowers	27–33	Toronto Rush	Toronto, Ontario
17:00	Scoring by quarter: 9–8, 7–7, 6–11, 5–7			Stadium: Varsity Stadium
17:00	Goals: C. Johnson, A. Davis (5); Assists: L. Dallmann (7); Blocks: A. Davis (4); Plus/minus: A. Davis (+8)	Stats	Goals: A. Carroll (6); Assists: A. Carroll (8); Blocks: Three players (2); Plus/minus: A. Carroll (+13)	Stadium: Varsity Stadium

=== Standings ===
==== East Division ====
Team	W	L	PD	Qualifying position
Toronto Rush	8	3	+35	East Division Final
DC Breeze	9	4	+42	East Division Playoff
Montreal Royal	8	4	+10	East Division Playoff
New York Empire	5	6	+11	
Philadelphia Phoenix	3	9	–46	
Ottawa Outlaws	2	9	–48	

As of matches played July 2

==== Midwest Division ====
Team	W	L	PD	Qualifying position
Madison Radicals	10	2	+41	Midwest Division Final
Minnesota Wind Chill	8	2	+35	Midwest Division Playoff
Pittsburgh Thunderbirds	7	4	+14	Midwest Division Playoff
Indianapolis AlleyCats	4	7	+1	
Chicago Wildfire	3	9	–26	
Detroit Mechanix	1	11	–73	

As of matches played July 2

==== West Division ====
Team	W	L	PD	Qualifying position
San Jose Spiders	8	3	+10	West Division Final
San Francisco FlameThrowers	7	4	+34	West Division Playoff
Los Angeles Aviators	7	4	+10	West Division Playoff
Seattle Cascades	6	5	+30	
San Diego Growlers	5	6	–10	
Vancouver Riptide	1	12	–78	

As of matches played July 2

==== South Division ====
2017 American Ultimate Disc League South	W	L	PD	Qualifying position
Raleigh Flyers	11	1	+52	South Division Final
Dallas Roughnecks	10	2	+67	South Division Playoff
Jacksonville Cannons	7	4	+16	South Division Playoff
Austin Sol	4	8	–5	
Atlanta Hustle	4	9	–10	
Nashville NightWatch	0	10	–112	

As of matches played July 2

=== Results and schedule ===
All times are in Eastern Time

==== Week 1 ====
April 1, 2017 South	Atlanta Hustle	19–27	Raleigh Flyers	Cary, North Carolina
18:30				Stadium: WakeMed Soccer Park
18:30	Goals: M. Smith (4); Assists: N. Vickroy (4); Blocks: K. Williams, A. Laviolette (3); Plus/minus: M. Leonard (+5)	Stats	Goals: N. Saul, S. Sisco (4); Assists: J. Nethercutt (4); Blocks: H. Taylor (4); Plus/minus: J. Helton (+6)	Stadium: WakeMed Soccer Park

April 1, 2017 South	Nashville NightWatch	23–40	Jacksonville Cannons	Jacksonville, Florida
19:00				Stadium: Hodges Field
19:00	Goals: E. Downs (5); Assists: B. Waldron (5); Blocks: Z. Avello (2); Plus/minus: Z. Avello, E. Downs (+6)	Stats	Goals: J. Langdon (10); Assists: C. Sullivan, J. Langdon (6); Blocks: B. Seuntjens, M. Freystaetter (3); Plus/minus: J. Langdon (+16)	Stadium: Hodges Field

April 1, 2017 South	Austin Sol	17–21	Dallas Roughnecks	The Colony, Texas
20:00				Stadium: The Colony Complex
20:00	Goals: E. Pollack (4); Assists: P. Starkel (4); Blocks: Three players (2); Plus/minus: E. Pollack (+4)	Stats	Goals: Three players (4); Assists: D. Freechild, J. Mickle (5); Blocks: D. Emmons (3); Plus/minus: D. Freechild (+8)	Stadium: The Colony Complex

April 1, 2017 West	San Jose Spiders	29–34	San Francisco FlameThrowers	Oakland, California
21:00				Stadium: Laney College Stadium
21:00	Goals: A. Berry, S. Earley (5); Assists: J. Norden (6); Blocks: Four players (2); Plus/minus: J. Stearns (+8)	Stats	Goals: G. Lindsley, J. Schlachet (6); Assists: C. Rasmussen (7); Blocks: G. Cohen, L. Dallmann (2); Plus/minus: C. Rasmussen (+11)	Stadium: Laney College Stadium

April 1, 2017 West	Los Angeles Aviators	31–26	San Diego Growlers	San Diego, California
22:00				Stadium: Balboa Stadium
22:00	Goals: M. Elbogen (11); Assists: E. Lissner (5); Blocks: T. Doi, M. Steiner (2); Plus/minus: M. Elbogen (+15)	Stats	Goals: T. Bacon, H. Corbett (4); Assists: K. Smith (4); Blocks: D. Leggio, S. Milardovich (2); Plus/minus: T. Bacon (+6)	Stadium: Balboa Stadium

April 1, 2017 West	Vancouver Riptide	18–29	Seattle Cascades	Seattle, Washington
22:00				Stadium: Memorial Stadium
22:00	Goals: B. Wong (5); Assists: M. Hibbert (4); Blocks: R. Tejpar (3); Plus/minus: B. Wong (+7)	Stats	Goals: M. Burton, K. El-Salaam (5); Assists: M. Burton (6); Blocks: J. Randolph, W. Chen (2); Plus/minus: M. Burton (+10)	Stadium: Memorial Stadium

April 2, 2017 Midwest	Madison Radicals	24–19	Indianapolis AlleyCats	Indianapolis, Indiana
16:30				Stadium: Roncalli Stadium
16:30	Goals: C. Camp (5); Assists: P. Shriwise, A. Meshnick (3); Blocks: Four players (2); Plus/minus: K. Petit-Scantling (+7)	Stats	Goals: R. Gross, A. Schwartz (4); Assists: C. Brock (4); Blocks: T. Carpenter (3); Plus/minus: R. Gross (+7)	Stadium: Roncalli Stadium

==== Week 2 ====
April 8, 2017 East	Toronto Rush	22–17	New York Empire	New York City, New York
16:30				Stadium: Randall's Island
16:30	Goals: C. Harris, C. Armstrong (3); Assists: A. Yearwood, J. Martin (3); Blocks: I. Mackenzie, J. Martin (3); Plus/minus: J. Martin (+6)	Stats	Goals: Three players (3); Assists: H. Garvey (6); Blocks: J. Babbitt (4); Plus/minus: J. Babbitt (7)	Stadium: Randall's Island

April 8, 2017 Midwest	Detroit Mechanix	15–25	Indianapolis AlleyCats	Indianapolis, Indiana
19:30				Stadium: Roncalli Stadium
19:30	Goals: B. Moyer, J. Steslicki (3); Assists: A. Engel (4); Blocks: N. Champoux (3); Plus/minus: J. Steslicki (+5)	Stats	Goals: C. Brock, R. Gross (5); Assists: K. Plew (7); Blocks: J. Jones, R. Gross (4); Plus/minus: K. Plew (+9)	Stadium: Roncalli Stadium

April 8, 2017 South	Raleigh Flyers	26–19	Austin Sol	Austin, Texas
20:00				Stadium: House Park Stadium
20:00		Stats	Goals: C. Denecour (4); Assists: M. Bierschenk (3); Blocks: A. Walch (4); Plus/minus: A. Walch (+5)	Stadium: House Park Stadium

April 8, 2017 West	San Francisco FlameThrowers	22–24	San Jose Spiders	Los Altos Hills, California
22:00				Stadium: Foothill College Stadium
22:00	Goals: B. Kittredge (5); Assists: C. Rasmussen (6); Blocks: A. Davis (3); Plus/minus: C. Rasmussen, B. Kittredge (+8)	Stats	Goals: J. Stearns (7); Assists: J. Norden (8); Blocks: T. Adams, E. Falat (3); Plus/minus: J. Stearns (+7)	Stadium: Foothill College Stadium

April 9, 2017 East	Toronto Rush	21–32	DC Breeze	Washington, D.C.
14:00				Stadium: Hotchkiss Field
14:00	Goals: A. Carroll (6); Assists: C. Harris (5); Blocks: A. Carroll (2); Plus/minus: C. Harris (+5)	Stats	Goals: T. Monroe (7); Assists: A. Kolick (5); Blocks: B. Marshall, C. Cantone (3); Plus/minus: T. Monroe (+11)	Stadium: Hotchkiss Field

April 9, 2017 South	Raleigh Flyers	18–33	Dallas Roughnecks	The Colony, Texas
14:00				Stadium: The Colony Complex
14:00		Stats	Goals: A. Coffin (6); Assists: D. Freechild (6); Blocks: D. Emmons (4); Plus/minus: S. Peterson (+8)	Stadium: The Colony Complex

April 9, 2017 West	Vancouver Riptide	18–21	Los Angeles Aviators	Los Angeles, California
16:30				Stadium: Jack Kemp Stadium
16:30		Stats	Goals: B. Nguyen (7); Assists: E. Lissner (4); Blocks: A. Padula (4); Plus/minus: B. Nguyen (+9)	Stadium: Jack Kemp Stadium

==== Week 3 ====
April 15, 2017 South	Atlanta Hustle	37–27	Nashville NightWatch	Nashville, Tennessee
19:00				Stadium: Hunters Lane Stadium
19:00	Goals: J. Bush (7); Assists: D. Tunnell (8); Blocks: J. Burns, P. Lally (2); Plus/minus: M. Smith, D. Tunnell (+11)	Stats	Goals: J. Wright (8); Assists: T. Conger (5); Blocks: Four players (1); Plus/minus: J. Wright (+9)	Stadium: Hunters Lane Stadium

April 15, 2017 South	Raleigh Flyers	25–18	Jacksonville Cannons	Jacksonville, Florida
19:00				Stadium: Hodges Field
19:00	Goals: S. Sisco, J. Helton (4); Assists: Four players (3); Blocks: Three players (3); Plus/minus: J. Allen (+6)	Stats	Goals: A. McKelvey (3); Assists: C. Sullivan (4); Blocks: J. Polk, B. Seuntjens (2); Plus/minus: J. Langton, T. Catron (+4)	Stadium: Hodges Field

==== Week 4 ====
April 21, 2017 West	San Diego Growlers	25–30	San Jose Spiders	San Jose, California
22:30				Stadium: Foothill College Stadium
22:30	Goals: S. Ham (5); Assists: T. Dunn (5); Blocks: Four players (1); Plus/minus: T. Dunn (+7)	Stats	Goals: E. Brydon, K. Van Arsdale (5); Assists: J. Norden (5); Blocks: M. Crawford (4); Plus/minus: B. Fein, J. Stearns (+6)	Stadium: Foothill College Stadium

April 22, 2017 East	Montreal Royal	24–23(2OT)	Philadelphia Phoenix	Philadelphia, Pennsylvania
18:30				Stadium: A.A. Garthwaite Stadium
18:30		Stats	Goals: S. Mott (4); Assists: S. Mott (6); Blocks: W. Hoehne (4); Plus/minus: W. Hoehne (+9)	Stadium: A.A. Garthwaite Stadium

April 22, 2017 East vs. South	DC Breeze	21–23(OT)	Raleigh Flyers	Raleigh, North Carolina
19:00	Scoring by quarter: 5–3, 7–6, 5–4, 3–7, Overtime: 1–3			Stadium: Cardinal Gibbons Stadium
19:00	Goals: E. Miner (4); Assists: A. Kolick (7); Blocks: Three players (2); Plus/minus: L. Blake (+5)	Stats	Goals: M. Bode (7); Assists: J. Nethercutt (6); Blocks: D. Richardson, H. Taylor (4); Plus/minus: D. Richardson, J. Nethercutt (+5)	Stadium: Cardinal Gibbons Stadium

April 22, 2017 Midwest	Chicago Wildfire	22–30	Pittsburgh Thunderbirds	Pittsburgh, Pennsylvania
19:00				Stadium: George K. Cupples Stadium
19:00	Goals: M. Pardo, D. Miller (5); Assists: P. Janas (7); Blocks: Five players (1); Plus/minus: E. Johnson (+5)	Stats	Goals: M. Sheppard (8); Assists: P. Earles (6); Blocks: A. Reppermund (4); Plus/minus: M. Sheppard (+10)	Stadium: George K. Cupples Stadium

April 22, 2017 Midwest	Indianapolis AlleyCats	16–26	Minnesota Wind Chill	Blaine, Minnesota
19:00				Stadium: National Sports Center
19:00	Goals: R. Gross (4); Assists: C. Brock (4); Blocks: R. Gross (3); Plus/minus: R. Gross (+7)	Stats	Goals: R. Osgar (5); Assists: J. Klane (5); Blocks: J. Drescher (4); Plus/minus: R. Osgar (+8)	Stadium: National Sports Center

April 22, 2017 South	Jacksonville Cannons	27–25	Atlanta Hustle	Atlanta, Georgia
19:00				Stadium: Grady Stadium
19:00	Goals: C. Sullivan (7); Assists: C. Sullivan (7); Blocks: Three players (1); Plus/minus: C. Sullivan (+12)	Stats	Goals: D. Tunnell, A. Laviolette (4); Assists: N. Vickroy, D. Tunnell (5); Blocks: Three players (2); Plus/minus: M. Leonard, D. Tunnell (+7)	Stadium: Grady Stadium

April 22, 2017 South	Dallas Roughnecks	30–24	Austin Sol	Austin, Texas
20:00				Stadium: House Park Stadium
20:00	Goals: D. Freechild, J. Froude (6); Assists: A. Coffin (5); Blocks: D. Emmons, M. Bennett (3); Plus/minus: Four players (+7)	Stats	Goals: C. Denecour (5); Assists: Four players (3); Blocks: M. Matthis, M. Bennett (2); Plus/minus: C. Denecour (+7)	Stadium: House Park Stadium

April 22, 2017 West	San Diego Growlers	19–28	San Francisco FlameThrowers	Oakland, California
21:00				Stadium: Laney College Stadium
21:00	Goals: S. Ham (5); Assists: B. Ivers (3); Blocks: Four players (2); Plus/minus: S. Ham (+7)	Stats	Goals: L. Dallmann (4); Assists: M. Sanchez (6); Blocks: A. Davis (3); Plus/minus: A. Davis (+8)	Stadium: Laney College Stadium

April 22, 2017 West	Seattle Cascades	27–24	Vancouver Riptide	Burnaby, British Columbia
21:00				Stadium: Swangard Stadium
21:00		Stats	Goals: T. Barbieri (7); Assists: T. Tsang (6); Blocks: A. Davis, M. Hibbert (3); Plus/minus: T. Barbieri (+8)	Stadium: Swangard Stadium

April 23, 2017 East	Montreal Royal	8–21	New York Empire	New York City, New York
13:00				Stadium: MCU Park
13:00	Goals: N. Dandurand (2); Assists: C. Foster, M. Goderre (2); Blocks: N. Mbae Vogel (2); Plus/minus: C. Foster, N. Mbae Vogel (3)	Stats	Goals: C. Kline, J. Babbitt (5); Assists: M. LeMar, H. Garvey (3); Blocks: R. Drost, J. Babbitt (4); Plus/minus: J. Babbitt (+8)	Stadium: MCU Park

April 23, 2017 South	Jacksonville Cannons	14–11	Nashville NightWatch	Nashville, Tennessee
13:00				Stadium: Hunters Lane Stadium
13:00	Goals: M. Freystaetter, J. Langdon (4); Assists: C. Sullivan (4); Blocks: B. Ley (5); Plus/minus: J. Langdon (+4)	Stats	Goals: C. Grandon, C. Hardesty (2); Assists: B. Breault (4); Blocks: T. Radcliffe (3); Plus/minus: J. Shofner (+2)	Stadium: Hunters Lane Stadium

==== Week 5 ====
April 28, 2017 West	San Jose Spiders	27–26	Seattle Cascades	Seattle, Washington
22:00				Stadium: Memorial Stadium
22:00	Goals: J. Stearns (7); Assists: E. Boucher (6); Blocks: K. Van Arsdale, M. Crawford (2); Plus/minus: J. Norden (+11)	Stats		Stadium: Memorial Stadium

April 29, 2017 East	Montreal Royal	22–19	Toronto Rush	Toronto, Ontario
16:00				Stadium: Varsity Stadium
16:00	Goals: N. Dandurand (4); Assists: M. Rick, A. Genest (4); Blocks: A. Arsenault (3); Plus/minus: Q. Bonnaud, N. Dandurand (+4)	Stats		Stadium: Varsity Stadium

April 29, 2017 Midwest	Chicago Wildfire	14–23	Detroit Mechanix	Detroit, Michigan
16:00				Stadium: Bishop Foley Stadium
16:00	Goals: A. Champe (3); Assists: P. Janas, C. O'Brien (2); Blocks: P. Janas (2); Plus/minus: D. Vock (+3)	Stats	Goals: J. Steslicki (5); Assists: A. Engel (4); Blocks: A. Kapiamba (4); Plus/minus: J. Steslicki (+5)	Stadium: Bishop Foley Stadium

April 29, 2017 East	Philadelphia Phoenix	13–18	New York Empire	New York City, New York
16:30				Stadium: Randall's Island
16:30	Goals: M. Arcata (4); Assists: S. Mott (3); Blocks: M. Brownlee, S. Mott (2); Plus/minus: S. Mott (+4)	Stats		Stadium: Randall's Island

April 29, 2017 East	Ottawa Outlaws	24–29	DC Breeze	Washington, D.C.
18:30				Stadium: Hotchkiss Field
18:30	Goals: A. Arsenault (5); Assists: D. Alexander (8); Blocks: J. MacGregor (3); Plus/minus: A. Arsenault (+5)	Stats	Goals: T. Monroe (7); Assists: T. Monroe (5); Blocks: D. Johnson (3); Plus/minus: T. Monroe, R. McDonnell (+8)	Stadium: Hotchkiss Field

April 29, 2017 Midwest	Indianapolis AlleyCats	25–26	Pittsburgh Thunderbirds	Pittsburgh, Pennsylvania
19:00				Stadium: George K. Cupples Stadium
19:00		Stats		Stadium: George K. Cupples Stadium

April 29, 2017 Midwest	Madison Radicals	20–22	Minnesota Wind Chill	Blaine, Minnesota
19:00				Stadium: National Sports Center
19:00	Goals: M. Weber, T. Coolidge (4); Assists: K. Brown (5); Blocks: T. Coolidge (2); Plus/minus: T. Coolidge (+5)	Stats	Goals: B. Vohnoutka (4); Assists: J. Drescher, J. Klane (4); Blocks: C. Berry (3); Plus/minus: J. Drescher (+7)	Stadium: National Sports Center

April 29, 2017 South	Austin Sol	23–28	Raleigh Flyers	Raleigh, North Carolina
19:00				Stadium: Cardinal Gibbons Stadium
19:00	Goals: M. Bennett (4); Assists: D. Richardson (4); Blocks: M. Walter (2); Plus/minus: Four players (+4)	Stats	Goals: J. Fairfax (5); Assists: D. Snoke (8); Blocks: Three players (2); Plus/minus: D. Snoke (+8)	Stadium: Cardinal Gibbons Stadium

April 29, 2017 South	Dallas Roughnecks	27–8	Nashville NightWatch	Nashville, Tennessee
19:00				Stadium: Hunters Lane Stadium
19:00	Goals: J. Anderson (5); Assists: D. Smith (4); Blocks: J. Froude (5); Plus/minus: T. Slack, J. Froude (+6)	Stats	Goals: Z. Avello (3); Assists: J. Wright (2); Blocks: B. Breault (2); Plus/minus: Z. Avello (+4)	Stadium: Hunters Lane Stadium

April 29, 2017 West	San Jose Spiders	28–22	Vancouver Riptide	Burnaby, British Columbia
21:00				Stadium: Swangard Stadium
21:00	Goals: E. Brydon (6); Assists: J. Norden (8); Blocks: B. Fein (4); Plus/minus: E. Brydon (+8)	Stats		Stadium: Swangard Stadium

April 29, 2017 West	San Francisco FlameThrowers	26–22	Los Angeles Aviators	Los Angeles, California
22:00				Stadium: Jack Kemp Stadium
22:00	Goals: A. Davis, M. Sanchez (6); Assists: C. Rasmussen (9); Blocks: Three players (3); Plus/minus: A. Davis (+9)	Stats	Goals: B. George (5); Assists: E. Lissner (5); Blocks: M. Steiner (3); Plus/minus: B. George (+7)	Stadium: Jack Kemp Stadium

April 30, 2017 East	Ottawa Outlaws	29–26	Philadelphia Phoenix	Philadelphia, Pennsylvania
13:00				Stadium: A.A. Garthwaite Stadium
13:00	Goals: A. Arsenault (10); Assists: D. Alexander, A. Ouchterlony (5); Blocks: J. Duiella (2); Plus/minus: A. Arsenault (+11)	Stats		Stadium: A.A. Garthwaite Stadium

April 30, 2017 South	Austin Sol	22–30	Jacksonville Cannons	Jacksonville, Florida
13:00				Stadium: Stanton College Prep
13:00	Goals: C. Wilder (5); Assists: R. Purcell (7); Blocks: C. Cunningham (3); Plus/minus: C. Wilder (+9)	Stats		Stadium: Stanton College Prep

April 30, 2017 South	Dallas Roughnecks	29–24	Atlanta Hustle	Atlanta, Georgia
16:00				Stadium: Grady Stadium
16:00	Goals: Three players (4); Assists: A. Coffin (6); Blocks: K. Marshall (4); Plus/minus: A. Coffin (+9)	Stats	Goals: J. Bush, M. Leonard (4); Assists: D. Tunnell (7); Blocks: J. Turner (3); Plus/minus: J. Bush (+6)	Stadium: Grady Stadium

April 30, 2017 West	San Francisco FlameThrowers	21–20	San Diego Growlers	San Diego, California
16:00				Stadium: Balboa Stadium
16:00	Goals: C. Rasmussen, L. Dallmann (4); Assists: C. Rasmussen (5); Blocks: Four players (2); Plus/minus: L. Dallmann (6)	Stats	Goals: S. Ham, M. Hume (4); Assists: D. Leggio (4); Blocks: N. Page (4); Plus/minus: N. Page (+7)	Stadium: Balboa Stadium

==== Week 6 ====
May 6, 2017 East	Toronto Rush	24–21	Ottawa Outlaws	Ottawa, Ontario
16:00				Stadium: Cumberland Millennium Sports Park
16:00	Goals: A. Carroll (4); Assists: J. Lindquist (4); Blocks: B. Tan (6); Plus/minus: B. Tan (+8)	Stats	Goals: A. Arsenault, P. Renaud (4); Assists: D. Alexander (5); Blocks: P. Lemerle (4); Plus/minus: A. Arsenault, O. Lemerle (5)	Stadium: Cumberland Millennium Sports Park

May 6, 2017 East	New York Empire	21–22	DC Breeze	Washington, D.C.
18:30				Stadium: Hotchkiss Field
18:30	Goals: M. Drost (4); Assists: T. Brooks (7); Blocks: R. Holmes (4); Plus/minus: Four players (+5)	Stats	Goals: C. Cantone, D. Johnson (3); Assists: C. Cantone (3); Blocks: A. Kolick, M. McDonnell (3); Plus/minus: C. Cantone, M. McDonnell (+6)	Stadium: Hotchkiss Field

May 6, 2017 Midwest	Indianapolis AlleyCats	25–28	Minnesota Wind Chill	Blaine, Minnesota
18:30				Stadium: National Sports Center
18:30	Goals: C. Brock, T. Carpenter (5); Assists: C. Brock (7); Blocks: R. Gross (2); Plus/minus: C. Brock (+8)	Stats	Goals: G. Cousins (7); Assists: J. Klane, N. Simonelli (5); Blocks: C. Berry (3); Plus/minus: J. Klane, G. Cousins (+7)	Stadium: National Sports Center

May 6, 2017 Midwest	Chicago Wildfire	16–18	Madison Radicals	Madison, Wisconsin
19:00				Stadium: Breese Stevens Field
19:00	Goals: M. Pardo (4); Assists: P. Janas (4); Blocks: Nine players (1); Plus/minus: K. Kingma (+6)	Stats	Goals: C. Camp, L. Pruess (3); Assists: B. Nelson, K. Brown (4); Blocks: A. Meshnick (3); Plus/minus: D. Wiseman, K.Brown (+4)	Stadium: Breese Stevens Field

May 6, 2017 South	Nashville NightWatch	23–32	Dallas Roughnecks	The Colony, Texas
20:00				Stadium: The Colony Complex
20:00	Goals: J. Wright (6); Assists: J. Wright, B. Waldron (3); Blocks: B. Breauly, J. Ortiz (2); Plus/minus: J. Wright (+9)	Stats	Goals: J. Froude (8); Assists: D. Freechild, D. Smith (6); Blocks: B. Lewis (4); Plus/minus: D. Freechild (+11)	Stadium: The Colony Complex

May 6, 2017 Midwest vs. West	Pittsburgh Thunderbirds	24–26	Seattle Cascades	Seattle, Washington
21:00	Scoring by quarter: 5–7, 5–8, 6–5, 8–6			Stadium: Memorial Stadium
21:00	Goals: M. Fedorenko (7); Assists: P. Earles (10); Blocks: A. Reppermund (6); Plus/minus: P. Earles, M. Thorne (+8)	Stats	Goals: M. Burton, B. Houser (4); Assists: B. Houser (5); Blocks: M. Russell, W. Chen (3); Plus/minus: M. Burton (+9)	Stadium: Memorial Stadium

May 6, 2017 West	Vancouver Riptide	14–22	San Diego Growlers	San Diego, California
21:30				Stadium: Balboa Stadium
21:30	Goals: P. Church, F. Lam (3); Assists: T. Tsang, W. Vu (3); Blocks: T. Barbieri (3); Plus/minus: Five players (+2)	Stats	Goals: H. Corbett (3); Assists: H. Corbett (6); Blocks: Four players (3); Plus/minus: H. Corbett (+6)	Stadium: Balboa Stadium

May 7, 2017 East	Toronto Rush	24–17	Montreal Royal	Montreal, Quebec
13:00				Stadium: Percival Molson Memorial Stadium
13:00	Goals: J. Martin (5); Assists: Je. Norden, A. Yearwood (5); Blocks: J. Martin (3); Plus/minus: J. Martin (+10)	Stats	Goals: Three players (3); Assists: M. Rick (4); Blocks: N. Mbae Vogel (4); Plus/minus: An. Arsenault, Q. Bonnaud (+5)	Stadium: Percival Molson Memorial Stadium

May 7, 2017 South	Nashville NightWatch	11–31	Austin Sol	Austin, Texas
13:00				Stadium: Westwood Stadium
13:00	Goals: Z. Avello (4); Assists: X. Payne (3); Blocks: P. Dougherty, P. Lindsey (2); Plus/minus: Z. Avello (+5)	Stats	Goals: C. Denecour (5); Assists: J. Schafer (5); Blocks: M. Walter (3); Plus/minus: C. Denecour (+6)	Stadium: Westwood Stadium

May 7, 2017 West	Vancouver Riptide	18–23	Los Angeles Aviators	Los Angeles, California
16:30				Stadium: Jack Kemp Stadium
16:30	Goals: P. Church, E. Guo (3); Assists: T. Tsang (5); Blocks: Four players (2); Plus/minus: Three players (+3)	Stats	Goals: M. Elbogen (4); Assists: E. Lissner (4); Blocks: Four players (2); Plus/minus: S. McDougall (+5)	Stadium: Jack Kemp Stadium

==== Week 7 ====
May 12, 2017 South	Dallas Roughnecks	22–24	Jacksonville Cannons	Jacksonville, Florida
19:30				Stadium: Hodges Field
19:30	Goals: D. Freechild (5); Assists: A. Coffin (7); Blocks: J. Froude (3); Plus/minus: D. Freechild (+8)	Stats	Goals: J. Huston (7); Assists: B. Ley (7); Blocks: M. Hickson (3); Plus/minus: Three players (+6)	Stadium: Hodges Field

May 13, 2017 East	DC Breeze	20–26	Toronto Rush	Toronto, Ontario
17:00				Stadium: Varsity Stadium
17:00	Goals: A. Kolick, J. Wodatch (4); Assists: T. Monroe (5); Blocks: Five players (1); Plus/minus: J. Wodatch (+5)	Stats	Goals: C. Harris, C. Armstrong (4); Assists: J. Lindquist (6); Blocks: M. Mackenzie, M. Lloyd (2); Plus/minus: J. Lindquist, C. Harris (+7)	Stadium: Varsity Stadium

May 13, 2017 East	Philadelphia Phoenix	21–25	Ottawa Outlaws	Ottawa, Ontario
18:00				Stadium: Cumberland Millennium Sports Park
18:00	Goals: S. Mott (6); Assists: N. Spiva (6); Blocks: M. Brownlee, G. Martin (3); Plus/minus: G. Martin (+5)	Stats	Goals: A. Arsenault (7); Assists: T. Sadler, K. Gee (5); Blocks: T. Sadler (3); Plus/minus: T. Sadler (+8)	Stadium: Cumberland Millennium Sports Park

May 13, 2017 South	Nashville NightWatch	19–31	Atlanta Hustle	Atlanta, Georgia
19:00				Stadium: Grady Stadium
19:00		Stats	Goals: A. Olsen, N. Vickroy (5); Assists: A. Laviolette, M. Leonard (8); Blocks: Four players (2); Plus/minus: A. Laviolette, M. Leonard (+7)	Stadium: Grady Stadium

May 13, 2017 South	Dallas Roughnecks	25–32	Raleigh Flyers	Raleigh, North Carolina
19:00				Stadium: Cardinal Gibbons Stadium
19:00	Goals: J. Froude (7); Assists: J. Mickle (9); Blocks: D. Smith, J. Froude (3); Plus/minus: J. Froude (+13)	Stats	Goals: J. Fairfax (6); Assists: J. Nethercutt (13); Blocks: Five players (1); Plus/minus: J. Nethercutt (+13)	Stadium: Cardinal Gibbons Stadium

May 13, 2017 Midwest	Madison Radicals	23–20	Indianapolis AlleyCats	Indianapolis, Indiana
19:30				Stadium: Roncalli Stadium
19:30	Goals: C. Camp (4); Assists: A. Brown (5); Blocks: A. Meshnick (4); Plus/minus: B. Hart (+6)	Stats	Goals: C. Brock (6); Assists: Four players (3); Blocks: C. Henderson (2); Plus/minus: C. Brock (+9)	Stadium: Roncalli Stadium

May 13, 2017 Midwest	Minnesota Wind Chill	20–17	Chicago Wildfire	Chicago, Illinois
20:00				Stadium: Lane Tech Stadium
20:00	Goals: G. Cousins, R. Osgar (4); Assists: J. Klane (6); Blocks: J. Drescher (3); Plus/minus: G. Cousins (+7)	Stats	Goals: M. Pardo (4); Assists: P. Janas (6); Blocks: M. Pardo (5); Plus/minus: M. Pardo (+10)	Stadium: Lane Tech Stadium

May 13, 2017 West	San Diego Growlers	26–27(OT)	Vancouver Riptide	Burnaby, British Columbia
21:00				Stadium: Swangard Stadium
21:00	Goals: C. Wu, S. Ham (4); Assists: H. Corbett (7); Blocks: N. Page, T. Purdy (3); Plus/minus: H. Corbett (+9)	Stats	Goals: P. Church (5); Assists: T. Tsang (6); Blocks: Three players (2); Plus/minus: M. Huddert (+7)	Stadium: Swangard Stadium

May 13, 2017 West	Seattle Cascades	28–27	San Francisco FlameThrowers	Oakland, California
21:00				Stadium: Laney College Stadium
21:00	Goals: D. Clark (7); Assists: M. Burton (9); Blocks: J. Doherty, R. Hendrickson (2); Plus/minus: M. Burton (+9)	Stats	Goals: J. Schlachet (5); Assists: L. Dallmann (9); Blocks: E. Kerns (4); Plus/minus: L. Dallmann (+8)	Stadium: Laney College Stadium

May 13, 2017 West	Los Angeles Aviators	22–28	San Jose Spiders	Los Altos Hills, California
22:00				Stadium: Foothill College Stadium
22:00	Goals: Five players (3); Assists: M. Elbogen (4); Blocks: M. Elbogen, S. McDougall (2); Plus/minus: M. Elbogen (+6)	Stats	Goals: J. Stearns (5); Assists: J. Norden (5); Blocks: I. Meyer, A. Moore (3); Plus/minus: Three players (+6)	Stadium: Foothill College Stadium

May 14, 2017 East	Philadelphia Phoenix	26–25(OT)	Montreal Royal	Montreal, Quebec
13:00				Stadium: Percival Molson Memorial Stadium
13:00	Goals: W. Hoehne (7); Assists: N. Spiva (10); Blocks: S. Xu (4); Plus/minus: W. Hoehne (+8)	Stats	Goals: Four players (4); Assists: A. Genest (7); Blocks: Three players (2); Plus/minus: A. Genest (+9)	Stadium: Percival Molson Memorial Stadium

May 14, 2017 Midwest	Minnesota Wind Chill	22–19	Detroit Mechanix	Detroit, Michigan
13:00				Stadium: Bishop Foley Stadium
13:00	Goals: G. Cousins (5); Assists: J. Klane (7); Blocks: J. Kittlesen (4); Plus/minus: G. Cousins (+7)	Stats	Goals: A. Davis (7); Assists: D. DOnovan (5); Blocks: A. Kapiamba (4); Plus/minus: R. Mariouw (+8)	Stadium: Bishop Foley Stadium

==== Week 8 ====
May 20, 2017 East	Montreal Royal	20–23	DC Breeze	Washington, D.C.
18:30				Stadium: Hotchkiss Field
18:30	Goals: M. Voelpel (4); Assists: F. Daigle (4); Blocks: Four players (2); Plus/minus: F. Daigle (+7)	Stats	Goals: J. Richards, M. Cassell (4); Assists: L. Blake (5); Blocks: R. McDonnell (6); Plus/minus: R. McDonnell (+8)	Stadium: Hotchkiss Field

May 20, 2017 Midwest	Detroit Mechanix	17–26	Minnesota Wind Chill	Blaine, Minnesota
18:30				Stadium: National Sports Center
18:30	Goals: A. Davis (9); Assists: D. Young (7); Blocks: Three players (2); Plus/minus: A. Davis (+8)	Stats	Goals: R. Osgar (5); Assists: B. Feldman (6); Blocks: L. Weiss (4); Plus/minus: B. Feldman (+8)	Stadium: National Sports Center

May 20, 2017 Midwest	Pittsburgh Thunderbirds	25–31	Madison Radicals	Madison, Wisconsin
19:00				Stadium: Breese Stevens Field
19:00	Goals: Three players (3); Assists: P. Earles (5); Blocks: E. Beardsley (3); Plus/minus: M. Thorne (+5)	Stats	Goals: P. Graffy (7); Assists: Three players (4); Blocks: A. Meshnick (5); Plus/minus: P. Graffy (+10)	Stadium: Breese Stevens Field

May 20, 2017 South	Atlanta Hustle	28–27	Austin Sol	Austin, Texas
19:00				Stadium: Round Rock Multisport Complex
19:00	Goals: N. Vickroy (6); Assists: M. Leonard (4); Blocks: S. Gainer (2); Plus/minus: M. Smith (+9)	Stats	Goals: C. Denecour (9); Assists: J. Loskorn (6); Blocks: J. Loskorn (3); Plus/minus: C. Denecour (+11)	Stadium: Round Rock Multisport Complex

May 20, 2017 South	Raleigh Flyers	21–20	Jacksonville Cannons	Jacksonville, Florida
19:00				Stadium: Hodges Field
19:00	Goals: J. Mouw (4); Assists: J. Helton (6); Blocks: J. Fairfax (3); Plus/minus: J. Helton (+6)	Stats	Goals: M, Fairley (4); Assists: C. LaRocque (6); Blocks: B. Seuntjens (2); Plus/minus: C. LaRocque (+7)	Stadium: Hodges Field

May 20, 2017 West	Vancouver Riptide	18–19	San Jose Spiders	Los Altos Hills, California
22:00				Stadium: Foothill College Stadium
22:00	Goals: B. Wong (4); Assists: B. Wong (4); Blocks: Four players (2); Plus/minus: B. Wong (+8)	Stats	Goals: J. Stearns (5); Assists: J. Norden (6); Blocks: B. Fein (5); Plus/minus: B. Fein (+6)	Stadium: Foothill College Stadium

May 21, 2017 Midwest	Detroit Mechanix	12–22	Chicago Wildfire	Chicago, Illinois
14:00				Stadium: Lane Tech Stadium
14:00	Goals: A. Davis (6); Assists: D. Young (5); Blocks: G. Binkley, A. Davis (3); Plus/minus: A. Vadis (+7)	Stats	Goals: M. Pardo (6); Assists: P. Janas (6); Blocks: M. Pardo, J. Weis (4); Plus/minus: Three players (+7)	Stadium: Lane Tech Stadium

May 21, 2017 South	Atlanta Hustle	18–26	Dallas Roughnecks	The Colony, Texas
14:00				Stadium: The Colony Complex
14:00	Goals: M. Smith, J. Bush (3); Assists: D. Tunnell (5); Blocks: Four players (2); Plus/minus: M. Smith (4)	Stats	Goals: D. Smith (4); Assists: D. Smith (8); Blocks: Four players (2); Plus/minus: D. Smith (+11)	Stadium: The Colony Complex

May 21, 2017 West	Vancouver Riptide	20–33	San Francisco FlameThrowers	Oakland, California
16:00				Stadium: Laney College Stadium
16:00	Goals: T. Barbieri (5); Assists: W. Vu, T. Knechtel (4); Blocks: P. Galbraith (2); Plus/minus: Four players (+3)	Stats	Goals: S, Thompson (6); Assists: S. Kanner (5); Blocks: Three players (2); Plus/minus: M. Sanchez (+9)	Stadium: Laney College Stadium

May 21, 2017 East	Montreal Royal	19–16	New York Empire	New York City, New York
16:00				Stadium: Randall's Island
16:00	Goals: B. Katz (5); Assists: S. Bonneau, K. Quinlan (3); Blocks: Q. Bonnaud (2); Plus/minus: Q. Bonnaud (+4)	Stats	Goals: J. Babbitt (4); Assists: Three players (3); Blocks: J. Babbitt (5); Plus/minus: J. Babbitt (+10)	Stadium: Randall's Island

==== Week 9 ====
May 27, 2017 East	DC Breeze	28–25	New York Empire	New York City, New York
13:00				Stadium: Randall's Island
13:00	Goals: Three players (4); Assists: R. McDonnell (6); Blocks: Six players (1); Plus/minus: T. Monroe (+8)	Stats	Goals: J. Babbitt (6); Assists: S. Keegan (6); Blocks: J. Alorro, R. Drost (3); Plus/minus: J. Babbitt (+7)	Stadium: Randall's Island

May 27, 2017 Midwest	Pittsburgh Thunderbirds	23–21	Detroit Mechanix	Detroit, Michigan
16:00				Stadium: Bishop Foley Stadium
16:00	Goals: T. Akyuz (5); Assists: J. Marmerstein (6); Blocks: Three players (2); Plus/minus: A. Reppermund (+7)	Stats	Goals: A. Davis (5); Assists: D. Donovan (7); Blocks: E. Lindberg, A. Davis (2); Plus/minus: D. Donovan (+8)	Stadium: Bishop Foley Stadium

May 27, 2017 East	Philadelphia Phoenix	18–31	Toronto Rush	Toronto, Ontario
17:00				Stadium: Varsity Stadium
17:00	Goals: W. Hoehne (4); Assists: M. Arcata (5); Blocks: D. Roman (3); Plus/minus: M. Arcata (+5)	Stats	Goals: A. Carroll (4); Assists: C. Harris (5); Blocks: M. Lloyd (4); Plus/minus: M. Lloyd (+9)	Stadium: Varsity Stadium

May 27, 2017 Midwest	Chicago Wildfire	20–21	Madison Radicals	Madison, Wisconsin
19:00				Stadium: Breese Stevens Field
19:00		Stats		Stadium: Breese Stevens Field

May 27, 2017 South	Jacksonville Cannons	23–20	Atlanta Hustle	Atlanta, Georgia
19:00				Stadium: Lakewood Stadium
19:00	Goals: J. Langdon (5); Assists: C. Sullivan (6); Blocks: M. Fairley, B. Seuntjens (2); Plus/minus: B. Ley (8)	Stats	Goals: Three players (3); Assists: A. Laviolette (4); Blocks: Nine players (1); Plus/minus: S. Gainer (+5)	Stadium: Lakewood Stadium

May 27, 2017 West	San Diego Growlers	24–23	Los Angeles Aviators	Los Angeles, California
22:00				Stadium: Jack Kemp Stadium
22:00	Goals: H. Corbett (6); Assists: J. Cohen, H. Corbett (5); Blocks: Eight players (1); Plus/minus: H. Corbett (+8)	Stats	Goals: B. Nguyen (4); Assists: M. Elbogen (4); Blocks: B. Severson, Z. Theodore (3); Plus/minus: M. Elbogen (+5)	Stadium: Jack Kemp Stadium

May 28, 2017 Midwest	Chicago Wildfire	20–23	Minnesota Wind Chill	Blaine, Minnesota
14:00				Stadium: National Sports Center
14:00		Stats		Stadium: National Sports Center

May 28, 2017 East	Philadelphia Phoenix	21–23	Montreal Royal	Montreal, Quebec
15:00				Stadium: Complexe sportif Claude-Robillard
15:00		Stats		Stadium: Complexe sportif Claude-Robillard

==== Week 10 ====
June 2, 2017 East	Montreal Royal	31–22	Ottawa Outlaws	Ottawa, Ontario
19:00				Stadium: Cumberland Millennium Sports Park
19:00	Goals: Q. Bonnaud (8); Assists: N. Mbae Vogel (7); Blocks: Four players (2); Plus/minus: N. Mbae Vogel (+11)	Stats	Goals: A. Arsenault (5); Assists: K. Gee (5); Blocks: D. Janssen, L. Laurent (2); Plus/minus: A. Arsenault (+9)	Stadium: Cumberland Millennium Sports Park

June 3, 2017 Midwest	Indianapolis AlleyCats	32–23	Detroit Mechanix	Detroit, Michigan
16:00				Stadium: Bishop Foley Stadium
16:00	Goals: R. Gross (7); Assists: S. Loscar (5); Blocks: A. Hamilton (3); Plus/minus: R. Gross (+12)	Stats	Goals: J. Bansfield (7); Assists: J. Bansfield (8); Blocks: X. Klena (3); Plus/minus: J. Bansfield, R. Mariouw (+9)	Stadium: Bishop Foley Stadium

June 3, 2017 Midwest	Ottawa Outlaws	23–33	Toronto Rush	Toronto, Ontario
17:00				Stadium: Varsity Stadium
17:00	Goals: A. Arsenault (6); Assists: D. Hochhalter, D. Alexander (4); Blocks: A. Arsenault, D. Alexander (1); Plus/minus: A. Arsenault (+6)	Stats	Goals: J. Boychuk, J. Woo (4); Assists: I. Masek-Kelly (5); Blocks: A. Carroll (3); Plus/minus: A. Carroll (+7)	Stadium: Varsity Stadium

June 3, 2017 East	DC Breeze	21–22	Philadelphia Phoenix	Philadelphia, Pennsylvania
18:30				Stadium: A.A. Garthwaite Stadium
18:30	Goals: L. Blake (4); Assists: T. Monroe (8); Blocks: M. Cassell (2); Plus/minus: T. Monroe, M. Cassell (+6)	Stats		Stadium: A.A. Garthwaite Stadium

June 3, 2017 South vs. Midwest	Dallas Roughnecks	23–17	Madison Radicals	Madison, Wisconsin
19:00	Scoring by quarter: 4–5, 4–5, 9–5, 6–2			Stadium: Breese Stevens Field
19:00	Goals: J. Mickle (4); Assists: A. Coffin (5); Blocks: J. Mickle (3); Plus/minus: A. Coffin (+7)	Stats	Goals: Four players (3); Assists: T. Annen (4); Blocks: S. Knoche, S. Richgels (2); Plus/minus: S. Knoche, T. Annen (+5)	Stadium: Breese Stevens Field

June 3, 2017 Midwest	Austin Sol	28–24	Nashville NightWatch	Nashville, Tennessee
19:00				Stadium: Hunters Lane Stadium
19:00	Goals: A. Davis (4); Assists: C. Cunningham (8); Blocks: B. Dial (3); Plus/minus: C. Cunningham (+9)	Stats	Goals: Z. Avello, C. Grandon (3); Assists: P. Dougherty (5); Blocks: C. Rae (4); Plus/minus: T. Radcliffe, Pa. Dougherty (+6)	Stadium: Hunters Lane Stadium

June 3, 2017 South	Jacksonville Cannons	26–27	Raleigh Flyers	Raleigh, North Carolina
19:00				Stadium: Cardinal Gibbons Stadium
19:00	Goals: J. Huston (7); Assists: A. Roney (7); Blocks: Six players (1); Plus/minus: A. Roney, J. Juston (+7)	Stats	Goals: J. Fairfax (5); Assists: J. Nethercutt (6); Blocks: Six players (1); Plus/minus: J. Fairfax, M. Mode (+7)	Stadium: Cardinal Gibbons Stadium

June 3, 2017 Midwest	Pittsburgh Thunderbirds	21–22	Chicago Wildfire	Chicago, Illinois
20:00				Stadium: Lane Tech Stadium
20:00	Goals: M. Fedorenko (5); Assists: P. Earles (7); Blocks: A. Reppermund, S. Trimble (2); Plus/minus: M. Fedorenko (+8)	Stats	Goals: M. Pardo (6); Assists: P. Janas (8); Blocks: Three players (2); Plus/minus: M. Pardo (+6)	Stadium: Lane Tech Stadium

June 3, 2017 West	San Diego Growlers	25–23	Vancouver Riptide	Burnaby, British Columbia
21:00				Stadium: Swangard Stadium
21:00	Goals: H. Corbett (6); Assists: Z. Ivers (5); Blocks: S. Milardovich (4); Plus/minus: H. Corbett, S. Ham (+8)	Stats	Goals: J. Dhillon (4); Assists: W. Vu (5); Blocks: F. Lam, M. Hibbert (3); Plus/minus: J. Dhillon, W. Vu (+6)	Stadium: Swangard Stadium

June 3, 2017 West	Los Angeles Aviators	28–23	San Jose Spiders	Los Altos Hills, California
22:00				Stadium: Foothill College Stadium
22:00	Goals: E. Friedman, B. Nguyen (4); Assists: T. Beatty (5); Blocks: Seven players (1); Plus/minus: E. Friedman (+9)	Stats	Goals: S. Earlet (5); Assists: J. Norden (6); Blocks: Three players (2); Plus/minus: J. Norden (+7)	Stadium: Foothill College Stadium

June 4, 2017 West	Los Angeles Aviators	24–30	San Francisco FlameThrowers	Oakland, California
16:30				Stadium: Laney College Stadium
16:30	Goals: B. Nguyen (6); Assists: E. Friedman (6); Blocks: Z. Theodore (4); Plus/minus: Three players (+6)	Stats		Stadium: Laney College Stadium

June 4, 2017 West	San Diego Growlers	22–19	Seattle Cascades	Seattle, Washington
16:00				Stadium: Genesee Park
16:00	Goals: T. Bacon, T. Dunn (3); Assists: Z. Ivers (4); Blocks: H. Corbett, S. Milardovich (3); Plus/minus: Z. Ivers (+6)	Stats		Stadium: Genesee Park

June 4, 2017 Midwest	Pittsburgh Thunderbirds	28–26	Indianapolis AlleyCats	Indianapolis, Indiana
16:30				Stadium: Roncalli Stadium
16:30	Goals: A. Reppermund (5); Assists: M. Thorne (6); Blocks: D. Tranquillo (3); Plus/minus: M. Thorne (7)	Stats	Goals: A. Schwartz (6); Assists: K. Cox, R. Gross (4); Blocks: N. Hutton (4); Plus/minus: R. Gross (+6)	Stadium: Roncalli Stadium

June 4, 2017 South	Austin Sol	24–27	Atlanta Hustle	Atlanta, Georgia
17:00				Stadium: Grady Stadium
17:00	Goals: M. Bennett, A. Walch (5); Assists: A. Davis (5); Blocks: Four players (1); Plus/minus: M. Bierschenk, A. Walch (+7)	Stats	Goals: M. Smith (7); Assists: P. Bray, C. Olsen (4); Blocks: J. Burns, P. Bray (2); Plus/minus: M. Smith (+7)	Stadium: Grady Stadium

June 4, 2017 East	New York Empire	17–18	DC Breeze	Washington, D.C.
17:30				Stadium: Hotchkiss Field
17:30	Goals: J. Babbitt, M. Wiener (3); Assists: S. Keegan (4); Blocks: J. Babbitt (4); Plus/minus: J. Babbitt (+8)	Stats	Goals: M. Cassell (5); Assists: T. Monroe (3); Blocks: A. Kolick (3); Plus/minus: Three players (+4)	Stadium: Hotchkiss Field

==== Week 11 ====
June 9, 2017 West	Seattle Cascades	20–21	San Diego Growlers	San Diego, California
22:00				Stadium: Balboa Stadium
22:00	Goals: B. Beehner, B. Simon Fox (3); Assists: M. Burton (6); Blocks: Five players (1); Plus/minus: K. El-Salaam (+6)	Stats	Goals: H. Corbett (4); Assists: D. Leggio (4); Blocks: S. Milardovich, N. Page (3); Plus/minus: H. Corbett, D. Leggio (+5)	Stadium: Balboa Stadium

June 10, 2017 East	Toronto Rush	35–28	Philadelphia Phoenix	Philadelphia, Pennsylvania
18:30				Stadium: A.A. Garthwaite Stadium
18:30	Goals: S. Armitage (7); Assists: I. Masek-Kelly (7); Blocks: M. Zlatic (3); Plus/minus: I. Masek-Kelly (+10)	Stats	Goals: M. Brownlee, W. Hoehne (6); Assists: S. Mott (10); Blocks: A. Manganelli, Q. Hunziker (2); Plus/minus: Three players (+8)	Stadium: A.A. Garthwaite Stadium

June 10, 2017 East	Ottawa Outlaws	13–16	Montreal Royal	Montreal, Quebec
19:00				Stadium: Complexe sportif Claude-Robillard
19:00	Goals: A. Arsenault, L. Loiseau (3); Assists: K. Gee (4); Blocks: N. Boucher (5); Plus/minus: A. Arsenault (+5)	Stats	Goals: Q. Bonnaud (4); Assists: Q. Bonnaud (4); Blocks: Q. Bonnaud (5); Plus/minus: Q. Bonnaud (+10)	Stadium: Complexe sportif Claude-Robillard

June 10, 2017 South	Atlanta Hustle	23–27	Jacksonville Cannons	Jacksonville, Florida
19:00				Stadium: Hodges Field
19:00	Goals: N. Vickroy (7); Assists: J. Bush (5); Blocks: Seven players (1); Plus/minus: N. Vickroy (+11)	Stats	Goals: J. Huston (8); Assists: A. Roney (8); Blocks: R. Chard, M. Hickson (2); Plus/minus: J. Huston (+10)	Stadium: Hodges Field

June 10, 2017 South	Nashville NightWatch	20–32	Raleigh Flyers	Raleigh, North Carolina
19:00				Stadium: Cardinal Gibbons Stadium
19:00	Goals: C. Snook (6); Assists: T. Conger (5); Blocks: C. Rae (2); Plus/minus: Three players (+5)	Stats	Goals: N. Saul, T. Mitchell (4); Assists: J. Nethercutt (12); Blocks: D. Richardson, C. Muniz (3); Plus/minus: J. Nethercutt (+12)	Stadium: Cardinal Gibbons Stadium

June 10, 2017 Midwest	Madison Radicals	23–22(OT)	Minnesota Wind Chill	Saint Paul, Minnesota
20:00				Stadium: Sea Foam Stadium
20:00	Goals: C. Camp, K. Pettit-Scantling (4); Assists: N. Thibedeau (5); Blocks: P. Graffy, S. Knoche (4); Plus/minus: Three players (+6)	Stats	Goals: G. Cousins (6); Assists: R. Osgar (5); Blocks: Three players (2); Plus/minus: R. Osgar (+7)	Stadium: Sea Foam Stadium

June 10, 2017 West	San Jose Spiders	19–27	San Francisco FlameThrowers	Oakland, California
21:00				Stadium: Laney College Stadium
21:00	Goals: J. Stearns (4); Assists: C. Cao (5); Blocks: C. Cao (3); Plus/minus: M. Jaffe (+5)	Stats	Goals: A. Davis (5); Assists: C. Rasmussen (6); Blocks: K. Cocks, J. Marcy (4); Plus/minus: E. Kerns (+8)	Stadium: Laney College Stadium

June 10, 2017 West	Seattle Cascades	20–25	Los Angeles Aviators	Los Angeles, California
22:00				Stadium: Jack Kemp Stadium
22:00	Goals: T. Li (5); Assists: M. Burton (8); Blocks: B. Houser (2); Plus/minus: M. Burton (+9)	Stats	Goals: T. Doi, B. George (4); Assists: E. Friedman (5); Blocks: Z. Theodore (4); Plus/minus: E. Friedman (+7)	Stadium: Jack Kemp Stadium

June 11, 2017 East	Toronto Rush	17–25	DC Breeze	Washington, D.C.
14:00				Stadium: Hotchkiss Field
14:00	Goals: J. Woo (3); Assists: I. Masek-Kelly (5); Blocks: Three players (2); Plus/minus: I. Masek-Kelly (+7)	Stats	Goals: J. Freund (4); Assists: A. Kolick (5); Blocks: D. Boylan-Kolchin (4); Plus/minus: B. Marshall (+5)	Stadium: Hotchkiss Field

==== Week 12 ====
June 17, 2017 Midwest	Detroit Mechanix	21–23	Indianapolis AlleyCats	Indianapolis, Indiana
15:45				Stadium: Roncalli Stadium
15:45	Goals: M. Rauls (4); Assists: M. Rauls (4); Blocks: Nine players (1); Plus/minus: M. Rauls (+5)	Stats	Goals: R. Gross (6); Assists: K. Plew (4); Blocks: R. Gross (4); Plus/minus: R. Gross (+11)	Stadium: Roncalli Stadium

June 17, 2017 West vs. East	San Francisco FlameThrowers	27–33	Toronto Rush	Toronto, Ontario
17:00	Scoring by quarter: 9–8, 7–7, 6–11, 5–7			Stadium: Varsity Stadium
17:00	Goals: C. Johnson, A. Davis (5); Assists: L. Dallmann (7); Blocks: A. Davis (4); Plus/minus: A. Davis (+8)	Stats	Goals: A. Carroll (6); Assists: A. Carroll (8); Blocks: Three players (2); Plus/minus: A. Carroll (+13)	Stadium: Varsity Stadium

June 17, 2017 East	DC Breeze	23–27	Montreal Royal	Montreal, Quebec
18:00				Stadium: Complexe sportif Claude-Robillard
18:00	Goals: C. Cantone (5); Assists: M. Cassell (5); Blocks: C. Cantone, T. Holland (2); Plus/minus: C. Cantone (+8)	Stats	Goals: Q. Bonnaud (6); Assists: Q. Bonnaud (6); Blocks: K. Groulx, G. Monfette (3); Plus/minus: Q. Bonnaud (+8)	Stadium: Complexe sportif Claude-Robillard

June 17, 2017 Midwest	Madison Radicals	22–21	Pittsburgh Thunderbirds	Pittsburgh, Pennsylvania
19:00				Stadium: George K. Cupples Stadium
19:00	Goals: A. Johnson (4); Assists: C. Camp, B. Nelson (4); Blocks: Three players (2); Plus/minus: C. Camp (+7)	Stats	Goals: M. Thorne (5); Assists: P. Earles (7); Blocks: M. Thorne (2); Plus/minus: P. Earles, M. Thorne (+7)	Stadium: George K. Cupples Stadium

June 17, 2017 South	Raleigh Flyers	24–21	Atlanta Hustle	Atlanta, Georgia
19:00				Stadium: Grady Stadium
19:00	Goals: M. Bode (6); Assists: N. Saul (5); Blocks: N. Goff (4); Plus/minus: M. Bode (+7)	Stats	Goals: M. Smith (7); Assists: Three players (3); Blocks: S. Choi, T. Spinks (2); Plus/minus: M. Smith (+7)	Stadium: Grady Stadium

June 17, 2017 Midwest	Minnesota Wind Chill	23–12	Chicago Wildfire	Chicago, Illinois
20:00				Stadium: Lane Tech Stadium
20:00	Goals: G. Cousins (5); Assists: C. Berry, J. Drescher (4); Blocks: J. Kittlesen (4); Plus/minus: Three players (+5)	Stats	Goals: M. Pardo (4); Assists: P. Janas (5); Blocks: Three players (2); Plus/minus: M. Pardo, C. O'Brien (+3)	Stadium: Lane Tech Stadium

June 17, 2017 South	Austin Sol	25–27	Dallas Roughnecks	The Colony, Texas
20:00				Stadium: The Colony Stadium
20:00	Goals: M. Matthis, M. Hays (3); Assists: C. Cunningham (6); Blocks: C. Cunningham (3); Plus/minus: C. Cunningham (+8)	Stats	Goals: A. Coffin (7); Assists: J. Froude (5); Blocks: K. Marshall (3); Plus/minus: A. Coffin (+8)	Stadium: The Colony Stadium

June 17, 2017 West	Seattle Cascades	24–19	Vancouver Riptide	Burnaby, British Columbia
21:00				Stadium: Swangard Stadium
21:00	Goals: B. Houser (4); Assists: J. Randolph (4); Blocks: J. Doherty (2); Plus/minus: J. Randolph, B. Houser (+5)	Stats	Goals: P. Church (5); Assists: W. Vu (4); Blocks: F. Lam (4); Plus/minus: P. Yu (+6)	Stadium: Swangard Stadium

June 17, 2017 West	San Jose Spiders	28–24	San Diego Growlers	San Diego, California
21:30				Stadium: Balboa Stadium
21:30	Goals: S. Earley (7); Assists: C. Cao (5); Blocks: B. Fein (5); Plus/minus: S. Earley (+8)	Stats	Goals: T. Dunn (4); Assists: Z. Ivers (4); Blocks: S. Milardovich (3); Plus/minus: M. Parisi, S. Milardovich (+6)	Stadium: Balboa Stadium

June 18, 2017 South	Raleigh Flyers	Postponed	Nashville NightWatch	Nashville, Tennessee
13:00				Stadium: Hunters Lane Stadium
13:00		Stats		Stadium: Hunters Lane Stadium

June 18, 2017 East	DC Breeze	28–13	Ottawa Outlaws	Ottawa, Ontario
14:00				Stadium: Cumberland Millennium Sports Park
14:00	Goals: M. Cassell (5); Assists: D. Cranston (5); Blocks: J. Richards (3); Plus/minus: J. Wodatch (+7)	Stats	Goals: K. Alexander (4); Assists: D. Alexander (8); Blocks: N. Boucher (3); Plus/minus: K. Alexander (+3)	Stadium: Cumberland Millennium Sports Park

June 18, 2017 Midwest	Madison Radicals	21–11	Detroit Mechanix	Detroit, Michigan
16:00				Stadium: Bishop Foley Stadium
16:00	Goals: R. Barker (5); Assists: C. Camp (4); Blocks: K. Pettit-Scantling, A. Meshnick (4); Plus/minus: C. Camp, A. Meshnick (+7)	Stats	Goals: A. Davis (3); Assists: G. Bunkley (3); Blocks: J. Bansfield (2); Plus/minus: G. Binkley (5)	Stadium: Bishop Foley Stadium

June 18, 2017 East	Philadelphia Phoenix	14–27	New York Empire	New York City, New York
16:30				Stadium: Randall's Island
16:30	Goals: Three players (2); Assists: M. Brownlee, W. Hoehne (2); Blocks: G. Martin (2); Plus/minus: E. Nardelli (+3)	Stats	Goals: J. Babbitt, M. Stevens (5); Assists: C. Kocher (7); Blocks: B. Jagt (5); Plus/minus: J. Babbitt, B. Jagt (+10)	Stadium: Randall's Island

==== Week 13 ====
June 24, 2017 East	Ottawa Outlaws	22–23	New York Empire	Rochester, New York
17:00				Stadium: Holleder Memorial Stadium
17:00	Goals: L. Loiseau (6); Assists: N. Boucher (8); Blocks: C. Turner (2); Plus/minus: L. Loiseau (+5)	Stats	Goals: C. Kline (9); Assists: S. Keegan (4); Blocks: B. Jagt (4); Plus/minus: C. Kline (+7)	Stadium: Holleder Memorial Stadium

June 24, 2017 East	Philadelphia Phoenix	17–25	DC Breeze	Washington, D.C.
18:30				Stadium: Hotchkiss Field
18:30	Goals: M. Brownlee (4); Assists: S. Mott (4); Blocks: E. Nardelli (2); Plus/minus: M. Brownlee (+5)	Stats	Goals: M. Cassell (4); Assists: D. Bloodgood (4); Blocks: D. Johnson, J. Richards (3); Plus/minus: D. Johnson, J. Freund (+6)	Stadium: Hotchkiss Field

June 24, 2017 Midwest	Detroit Mechanix	9–21	Madison Radicals	Madison, Wisconsin
19:00				Stadium: Breese Stevens Field
19:00		Stats		Stadium: Breese Stevens Field

June 24, 2017 South	Jacksonville Cannons	13–27	Raleigh Flyers	Raleigh, North Carolina
19:00				Stadium: Cardinal Gibbons Stadium
19:00	Goals: J. Huston (5); Assists: A. Roney (5); Blocks: A. Gaines (2); Plus/minus: J. Huston, J. Polk (+3)	Stats	Goals: Three players (3); Assists: N. Saul (6); Blocks: J. Allen (4); Plus/minus: N. Saul, J. Allen (+7)	Stadium: Cardinal Gibbons Stadium

June 24, 2017 South	Atlanta Hustle	19–21	Dallas Roughnecks	The Colony, Texas
20:00				Stadium: The Colony Complex
20:00	Goals: Six players (2); Assists: Three players (3); Blocks: K. Williams (4); Plus/minus: K. Williams (+5)	Stats	Goals: T. Slack (3); Assists: C. Mazur (4); Blocks: J. Froude, B. Malecek (2); Plus/minus: J. Froude (+6)	Stadium: The Colony Complex

June 24, 2017 West	Los Angeles Aviators	21–20	Vancouver Riptide	Burnaby, British Columbia
21:00				Stadium: Swangard Stadium
21:00	Goals: B. Nguyen (5); Assists: E. Lissner (7); Blocks: Four players (2); Plus/minus: B. Nguyen (+7)	Stats	Goals: P. Galbraith, T. Tsang (4); Assists: B. Wong, P. Yu (4); Blocks: M. Hibbert (5); Plus/minus: Three players (+6)	Stadium: Swangard Stadium

June 24, 2017 West	San Francisco FlameThrowers	26–29	San Jose Spiders	Los Altos Hills, California
22:00				Stadium: Foothill College Stadium
22:00	Goals: J. Marcy (7); Assists: B. Kittredge (5); Blocks: Five players (2); Plus/minus: J. Marcy (+9)	Stats	Goals: S. Zaccaro, M. Crawford (4); Assists: A. Berry (6); Blocks: E. Falat (3); Plus/minus: S. Zaccaro, A. Berry (+7)	Stadium: Foothill College Stadium

June 25, 2017 East	Ottawa Outlaws	14–22	Philadelphia Phoenix	Philadelphia, Pennsylvania
14:00				Stadium: A.A. Garthwaite Stadium
14:00	Goals: Three players (3); Assists: K. Alexander (3); Blocks: J. Hill (3); Plus/minus: C. Brotman (+5)	Stats	Goals: Four players (3); Assists: S. Mott (6); Blocks: M. Esser (4); Plus/minus: M. Brownlee, S. Mott (+8)	Stadium: A.A. Garthwaite Stadium

June 25, 2017 South	Atlanta Hustle	25–26	Austin Sol	Austin, Texas
13:00				Stadium: Westwood Stadium
13:00	Goals: M. Smith (6); Assists: N. Vickroy (8); Blocks: Four players (2); Plus/minus: N. Vickroy (+7)	Stats	Goals: D. Richardson (6); Assists: J. Loskorn (5); Blocks: M. Hays (4); Plus/minus: D. Richardson (+8)	Stadium: Westwood Stadium

June 25, 2017 Midwest	Indianapolis AlleyCats	16–18	Pittsburgh Thunderbirds	Pittsburgh, Pennsylvania
14:00				Stadium: George K. Cupples Stadium
14:00	Goals: R. Gross (3); Assists: K. Plew (4); Blocks: K. Plew (3); Plus/minus: K. Plew, C. Brock (+4)	Stats	Goals: J. Marmerstein (3); Assists: S. VanDusen (7); Blocks: S. Trimble (4); Plus/minus: S. VanDusen (+5)	Stadium: George K. Cupples Stadium

June 25, 2017 Midwest	Detroit Mechanix	16–23	Chicago Wildfire	Chicago, Illinois
14:00				Stadium: Lane Tech Stadium
14:00		Stats	Goals: M. Pardo (9); Assists: P. Janas (8); Blocks: Three players (2); Plus/minus: M. Pardo (+6)	Stadium: Lane Tech Stadium

June 25, 2017 West	Los Angeles Aviators	29–26	Seattle Cascades	Seattle, Washington
16:00				Stadium: Memorial Stadium
16:00	Goals: B. Nguyen (4); Assists: E. Lissner (4); Blocks: A. Weaver, B. Severson (2); Plus/minus: T. Beatty (+6)	Stats	Goals: B. Houser (5); Assists: M. Burton (6); Blocks: Eight players (1); Plus/minus: B. Houser (+8)	Stadium: Memorial Stadium

==== Week 14 ====
June 30, 2017 West	Vancouver Riptide	10–31	Seattle Cascades	Seattle, Washington
22:00				Stadium: Memorial Stadium
22:00	Goals: K. Greer (2); Assists: Four players (2); Blocks: P. Church (4); Plus/minus: Five players (+1)	Stats	Goals: T. Yen (5); Assists: M. Burton (7); Blocks: R. Hendrickson, A. Lynch (3); Plus/minus: M. Burton (+10)	Stadium: Memorial Stadium

July 1, 2017 Midwest	Pittsburgh Thunderbirds	22–14	Detroit Mechanix	Detroit, Michigan
16:00				Stadium: Bishop Foley Stadium
16:00	Goals: D. Vatz (4); Assists: S. VanDusen (7); Blocks: A. Reppermund, D. Tranquilo (3); Plus/minus: Five players (+4)	Stats		Stadium: Bishop Foley Stadium

July 1, 2017 East	New York Empire	20–29	Montreal Royal	Montreal, Quebec
19:00				Stadium: Complexe sportif Claude-Robillard
19:00	Goals: C. Kline (6); Assists: S. Keegan (5); Blocks: Four players (2); Plus/minus: C. Kline (+8)	Stats	Goals: S. Bonneau (7); Assists: M. Voelpel, K. Quinlan (5); Blocks: Three players (2); Plus/minus: K. Quinlan (+9)	Stadium: Complexe sportif Claude-Robillard

July 1, 2017 Midwest	Minnesota Wind Chill	13–21	Madison Radicals	Madison, Wisconsin
19:00				Stadium: Breese Stevens Field
19:00	Goals: C. Denecour (5); Assists: G. Cousins, J. Klane (3); Blocks: C. Denecour (2); Plus/minus: G. Cousins (+6)	Stats		Stadium: Breese Stevens Field

July 1, 2017 South	Austin Sol	27–21	Nashville NightWatch	Nashville, Tennessee
19:00				Stadium: Hunters Lane Stadium
19:00	Goals: Three players (4); Assists: M. Bierschenk (5); Blocks: J. Best (4); Plus/minus: M. Hays (+7)	Stats	Goals: C. Hardesty (7); Assists: C. Rae (5); Blocks: M. Russnogle (4); Plus/minus: C. Hardesty (+8)	Stadium: Hunters Lane Stadium

July 1, 2017 Midwest	Chicago Wildfire	24–30	Indianapolis AlleyCats	Indianapolis, Indiana
19:30				Stadium: Roncalli Stadium
19:30	Goals: M. Pardo (9); Assists: P. Janas (8); Blocks: D. Vock (2); Plus/minus: M. Pardo (+12)	Stats	Goals: S. Loscar, R. Gross (5); Assists: C. Brock, R. Gross (6); Blocks: J. Jones, J. Fella (3); Plus/minus: C. Brock, R. Gross (+9)	Stadium: Roncalli Stadium

July 2, 2017 East	New York Empire	20–19	Ottawa Outlaws	Ottawa, Ontario
14:00				Stadium: Cumberland Millennium Sports Park
14:00	Goals: M. Kuzmowycz (4); Assists: H. Garvery, S. Keegan (4); Blocks: M. LeMar (4); Plus/minus: M. LeMar (+5)	Stats	Goals: K. Gee, S. Westwell (3); Assists: D. Alexander (4); Blocks: J. Duiella (3); Plus/minus: J. Duiella (+4)	Stadium: Cumberland Millennium Sports Park

July 2, 2017 Midwest	Chicago Wildfire	20–21	Pittsburgh Thunderbirds	Pittsburgh, Pennsylvania
14:00				Stadium: George K. Cupples Stadium
14:00	Goals: M. Pardo (7); Assists: P. Janas (6); Blocks: Four players (2); Plus/minus: M. Pardo (+9)	Stats	Goals: D. Vatz (4); Assists: Three players (3); Blocks: D. Tranquillo (3); Plus/minus: Three players (+4)	Stadium: George K. Cupples Stadium

==== Week 15 ====
July 7, 2017 West	Jacksonville Cannons	28–27	Dallas Roughnecks	The Colony, Texas
20:30				Stadium: The Colony Complex
20:30	Goals: J. Huston (11); Assists: B. Ley (8); Blocks: M. Freystaetter, B. Seuntjens (2); Plus/minus: J. Huston (+12)	Stats	Goals: S. Peterson (6); Assists: J. Mickle (7); Blocks: J. Froude (2); Plus/minus: S. Peterson (+9)	Stadium: The Colony Complex

== Postseason ==
Championship Weekend was held August 26 and 27 at Complexe sportif Claude-Robillard in Montreal, Canada. The venue was chosen because of Montreal's support for their team, the Montreal Royal. The Dallas Roughnecks, Toronto Rush, Madison Radicals and San Francisco FlameThrowers qualified for the semifinals.

Division Playoffs
DC Breeze	28
Montreal Royal	16
Pittsburgh Thunderbirds	26
Minnesota Wind Chill	25
Los Angeles Aviators	33
San Jose Spiders	24
Dallas Roughnecks	22
Jacksonville Cannons	12

Division Finals
Toronto Rush	29
DC Breeze	26
Madison Radicals	27
Pittsburgh Thunderbirds	22
San Francisco FlameThrowers	33
Los Angeles Aviators	22
Raleigh Flyers	24
Dallas Roughnecks	27

AUDL Championship Semifinals
Madison Radicals	19
San Francisco FlameThrowers	23
Dallas Roughnecks	21
Toronto Rush	24

AUDL Championship
San Francisco FlameThrowers	30
Toronto Rush	29
