= 2019 American Ultimate Disc League season =

- League: American Ultimate Disc League
- Sport: Ultimate
- Duration: April 5 – August 11, 2019
- Teams: 24
- TV partner: Stadium

Regular season

Postseason
- East Division champions: New York Empire
- Midwest Division champions: Indianapolis AlleyCats
- West Division champions: San Diego Growlers
- South Division champions: Raleigh Flyers

Finals
- Champions: New York Empire

AUDL seasons
- ← 2018 2021 →

The 2019 American Ultimate Disc League season was the eighth season for the league. It began on April 5, 2019, and concluded on August 11, 2019, when the New York Empire defeated the Dallas Roughnecks to earn the team's first title. Ben Jagt of the Empire won his first league MVP award after the season. The season marked Steve Hall's first as league commissioner, and was the first with an all-star game for the league.

== Offseason ==
In early October 2018, AUDL franchise owners selected Steve Hall, a co-owner of the Atlanta Hustle, to be the new league commissioner for a three-year term. He succeeds previous commissioner Steve Gordon. Around the same time, the league announced tentative plans for a women's ultimate league to be started as early as 2020. Adding to the new endeavors, AUDL added an all-star game for the first time in league history and accordingly shortened the schedule from 14 to 12 regular-season games. 2019 marked the second year of the league's television agreement with Stadium.

Two teams folded over the offseason, the San Francisco FlameThrowers and the Nashville NightWatch. No new teams joined the league for the 2019 season.

== Regular season ==
Each team played twelve games, contested over fifteen weeks in the regular-season schedule.

=== Week 1 ===
Date	Home	Goals	Goals	Away
4/5	Dallas Roughnecks	19	17	Raleigh Flyers
4/6	Austin Sol	22	28	Raleigh Flyers
4/6	Seattle Cascades	27	28	San Jose Spiders
4/6	San Diego Growlers	20	18	Los Angeles Aviators
4/6	Tampa Bay Cannons	18	17	Atlanta Hustle

=== Week 2 ===
Date	Home	Goals	Goals	Away
4/12	San Jose Spiders	18	22	Los Angeles Aviators
4/13	New York Empire	21	18	DC Breeze
4/13	Austin Sol	19	17	Dallas Roughnecks
4/13	San Diego Growlers	25	24	San Jose Spiders
4/13	Atlanta Hustle	21	24	Raleigh Flyers
4/14	Indianapolis AlleyCats	20	22	Madison Radicals

The Austin Sol beat Texas rival Dallas Roughnecks for the first time in franchise history, snapping a twelve-game skid.

=== Week 3 ===
Date	Home	Goals	Goals	Away
4/20	DC Breeze	20	18	Philadelphia Phoenix
4/20	Seattle Cascades	20	24	Los Angeles Aviators
4/20	Minnesota Wind Chill	25	26	Chicago Wildfire
4/20	Madison Radicals	26	17	Pittsburgh Thunderbirds
4/20	San Jose Spiders	16	21	San Diego Growlers
4/20	Indianapolis AlleyCats	26	22	Detroit Mechanix
4/20	Dallas Roughnecks	21	17	Austin Sol
4/20	Tampa Bay Cannons	17	14	Atlanta Hustle

=== Week 4 ===
Date	Home	Goals	Goals	Away
4/26	San Diego Growlers	20	18	Seattle Cascades
4/27	Ottawa Outlaws	13	19	Toronto Rush
4/27	Detroit Mechanix	16	19	Indianapolis AlleyCats
4/27	Minnesota Wind Chill	25	22	Pittsburgh Thunderbirds
4/27	Philadelphia Phoenix	16	25	New York Empire
4/27	Atlanta Hustle	15	21	Raleigh Flyers
4/27	Los Angeles Aviators	25	19	Seattle Cascades
4/28	New York Empire	23	19	Montreal Royal

=== Week 5 ===
Date	Home	Goals	Goals	Away
5/4	Toronto Rush	21	16	Montreal Royal
5/4	Atlanta Hustle	23	19	Austin Sol
5/4	DC Breeze	24	15	Ottawa Outlaws
5/4	Chicago Wildfire	23	17	Minnesota Wind Chill
5/4	Pittsburgh Thunderbirds	16	19	Indianapolis AlleyCats
5/4	Seattle Cascades	25	21	San Diego Growlers
5/4	San Jose Spiders	16	25	Los Angeles Aviators
5/5	Detroit Mechanix	22	31	Minnesota Wind Chill
5/5	Raleigh Flyers	23	18	Austin Sol
5/5	Philadelphia Phoenix	21	16	Ottawa Outlaws

=== Week 6 ===
Date	Home	Goals	Goals	Away
5/11	Toronto Rush	26	25	Ottawa Outlaws
5/11	Los Angeles Aviators	21	27	San Diego Growlers
5/11	Madison Radicals	19	20	Minnesota Wind Chill
5/11	Pittsburgh Thunderbirds	21	18	Chicago Wildfire
5/11	New York Empire	26	25	DC Breeze
5/11	San Jose Spiders	24	19	Seattle Cascades
5/11	Indianapolis AlleyCats	22	27	Atlanta Hustle
5/11	Austin Sol	21	25	Dallas Roughnecks
5/11	Tampa Bay Cannons	19	24	Raleigh Flyers

=== Week 7 ===
Date	Home	Goals	Goals	Away
5/17	San Diego Growlers	32	20	San Jose Spiders
5/18	Los Angeles Aviators	24	21	San Jose Spiders
5/18	Chicago Wildfire	22	25	Madison Radicals
5/18	Minnesota Wind Chill	11	13	Indianapolis AlleyCats
5/18	Pittsburgh Thunderbirds	24	11	Detroit Mechanix
5/18	Ottawa Outlaws	22	21	DC Breeze
5/18	Raleigh Flyers	25	22	Atlanta Hustle
5/18	Austin Sol	17	19	Tampa Bay Cannons
5/18	New York Empire	22	17	Toronto Rush
5/19	Montreal Royal	19	20	DC Breeze
5/19	Dallas Roughnecks	28	21	Tampa Bay Cannons
5/19	Philadelphia Phoenix	18	16	Toronto Rush

=== Week 8 ===
Date	Home	Goals	Goals	Away
5/25	New York Empire	20	15	Ottawa Outlaws
5/25	Toronto Rush	22	15	Madison Radicals
5/25	Philadelphia Phoenix	15	25	Montreal Royal
5/25	Chicago Wildfire	18	17	Indianapolis AlleyCats
5/25	Pittsburgh Thunderbirds	24	17	Minnesota Wind Chill
5/25	Atlanta Hustle	23	14	Tampa Bay Cannons
5/25	Dallas Roughnecks	20	15	Austin Sol
5/26	DC Breeze	27	17	Montreal Royal
5/26	Detroit Mechanix	14	16	Madison Radicals

=== Week 9 ===
Date	Home	Goals	Goals	Away
6/1	Madison Radicals	15	18	Indianapolis AlleyCats
6/1	Detroit Mechanix	12	17	Pittsburgh Thunderbirds
6/1	Minnesota Wind Chill	27	26	Chicago Wildfire
6/1	DC Breeze	19	20	New York Empire
6/1	Ottawa Outlaws	19	21	Montreal Royal
6/1	Seattle Cascades	22	25	San Jose Spiders
6/1	Tampa Bay Cannons	24	16	Austin Sol
6/1	Los Angeles Aviators	18	20	San Diego Growlers
6/2	Atlanta Hustle	24	25	Austin Sol
6/2	Toronto Rush	19	13	Montreal Royal

=== Week 10 ===
No regular season games were held in week 10; instead, the inaugural AUDL All-Star contest was held.

=== Week 11 ===
Date	Home	Goals	Goals	Away
6/14	Tampa Bay Cannons	20	25	Dallas Roughnecks
6/15	New York Empire	19	14	Philadelphia Phoenix
6/15	Montreal Royal	21	22	Ottawa Outlaws
6/15	DC Breeze	23	22	Toronto Rush
6/15	Minnesota Wind Chill	21	19	Madison Radicals
6/15	San Diego Growlers	17	18	Los Angeles Aviators
6/15	Raleigh Flyers	27	18	Dallas Roughnecks
6/15	San Jose Spiders	25	26	Seattle Cascades
6/16	Chicago Wildfire	24	16	Detroit Mechanix
6/16	Philadelphia Phoenix	16	21	DC Breeze

=== Week 12 ===
Date	Home	Goals	Goals	Away
6/22	DC Breeze	21	18	Philadelphia Phoenix
6/22	Detroit Mechanix	11	24	Chicago Wildfire
6/22	Pittsburgh Thunderbirds	21	20	Madison Radicals
6/22	Seattle Cascades	25	30	San Diego Growlers
6/22	Montreal Royal	23	22	Toronto Rush
6/22	San Jose Spiders	27	31	Los Angeles Aviators
6/22	Indianapolis AlleyCats	24	23	Minnesota Wind Chill
6/22	Raleigh Flyers	24	25	New York Empire
6/22	Dallas Roughnecks	29	22	Tampa Bay Cannons
6/23	Austin Sol	23	14	Tampa Bay Cannons
6/23	Ottawa Outlaws	17	22	Toronto Rush

=== Week 13 ===
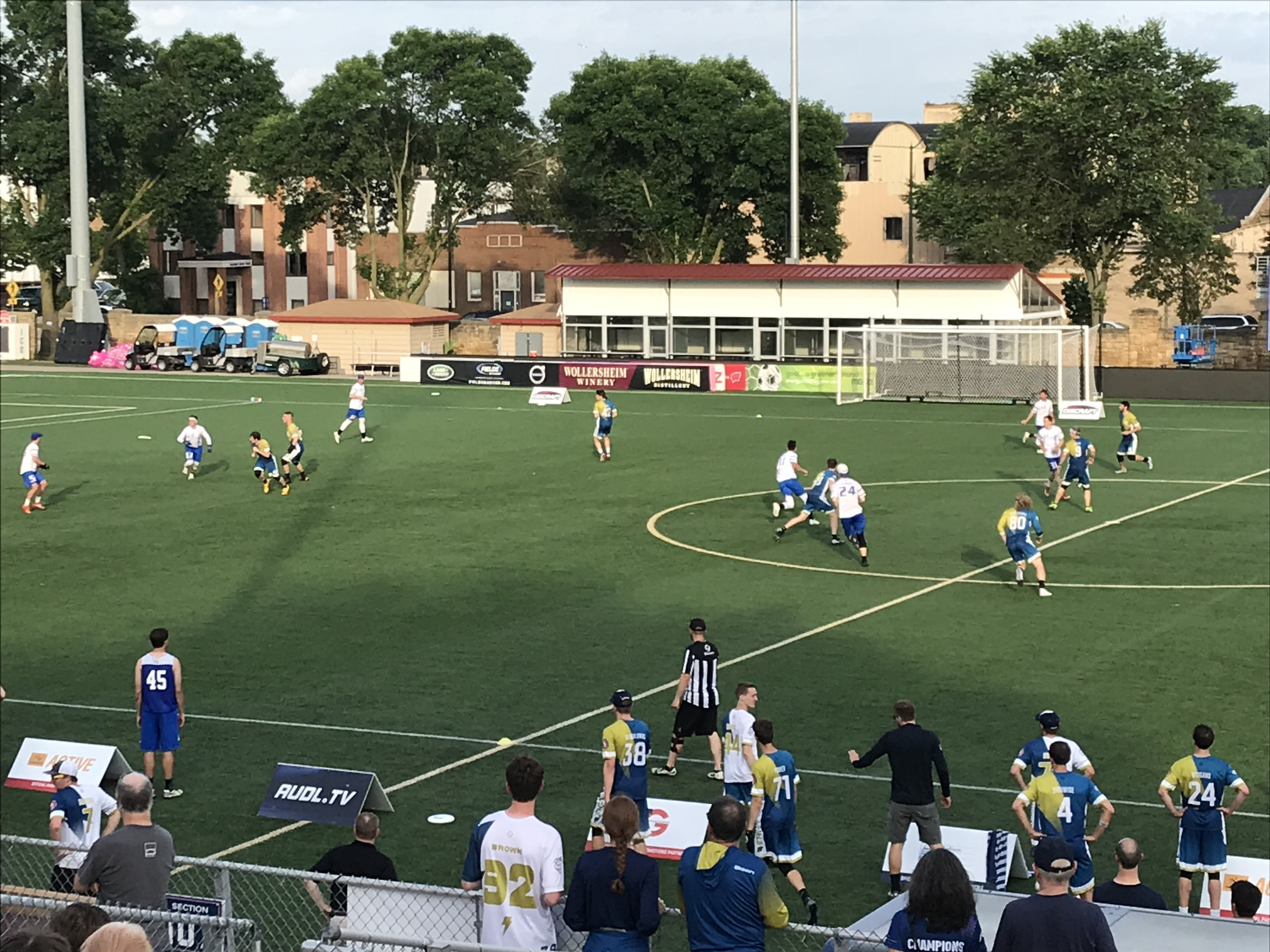
The Madison Radicals and Chicago Wildfire play at Breese Stevens Field on June 28.

Date	Home	Goals	Goals	Away
6/28	Madison Radicals	18	21	Chicago Wildfire
6/29	Toronto Rush	24	26	Philadelphia Phoenix
6/29	Minnesota Wind Chill	27	12	Detroit Mechanix
6/29	Pittsburgh Thunderbirds	20	23	Indianapolis AlleyCats
6/29	Montreal Royal	19	22	New York Empire
6/29	San Diego Growlers	26	25	Seattle Cascades
6/29	Dallas Roughnecks	18	15	Atlanta Hustle
6/29	Tampa Bay Cannons	20	22	Raleigh Flyers
6/30	Austin Sol	21	22	Atlanta Hustle
6/30	Chicago Wildfire	12	6	Detroit Mechanix
6/30	Los Angeles Aviators	27	14	Seattle Cascades
6/30	Ottawa Outlaws	23	27	New York Empire

=== Week 14 ===
Date	Home	Goals	Goals	Away
7/4	Montreal Royal	25	22	Ottawa Outlaws
7/5	Raleigh Flyers	22	15	Dallas Roughnecks
7/6	Detroit Mechanix	23	24	Pittsburgh Thunderbirds
7/6	Toronto Rush	26	21	DC Breeze
7/6	Seattle Cascades	23	31	Los Angeles Aviators
7/6	Madison Radicals	22	17	Minnesota Wind Chill
7/6	Philadelphia Phoenix	20	22	New York Empire
7/6	San Jose Spiders	20	26	San Diego Growlers
7/6	Atlanta Hustle	23	19	Dallas Roughnecks
7/6	Indianapolis AlleyCats	24	21	Chicago Wildfire

Cameron Brock of the Indianapolis AlleyCats became the first player in AUDL history to score 500 career goals, a feat he accomplished in the Week 14 matchup against the Chicago Wildfire.

=== Week 15 ===
Date	Home	Goals	Goals	Away
7/13	Chicago Wildfire	16	29	Pittsburgh Thunderbirds
7/13	Ottawa Outlaws	20	19	Philadelphia Phoenix
7/13	Raleigh Flyers	25	24	Tampa Bay Cannons
7/14	Madison Radicals	33	9	Detroit Mechanix
7/14	Montreal Royal	20	21	Philadelphia Phoenix
7/14	Indianapolis AlleyCats	17	25	Pittsburgh Thunderbirds

=== Standings ===
==== East Division ====
Team	W	L	Qualifying position
New York Empire	12	0	East Division Final
Toronto Rush	7	5	East Division Playoff
DC Breeze	7	5	East Division Playoff
Montreal Royal	4	8	
Philadelphia Phoenix	4	8	
Ottawa Outlaws	3	9	

==== Midwest Division ====
Team	W	L	Qualifying position
Indianapolis AlleyCats	8	4	Midwest Division Final
Pittsburgh Thunderbirds	8	4	Midwest Division Playoff
Chicago Wildfire	7	5	Midwest Division Playoff
Minnesota Wind Chill	6	6	
Madison Radicals	6	6	
Detroit Mechanix	0	12	

The Madison Radicals did not participate in the postseason for the first time in franchise history, having made playoff appearances from 2013 to 2018.

==== West Division ====
Team	W	L	Qualifying position
San Diego Growlers	10	2	West Division Final
Los Angeles Aviators	9	3	West Division Final
San Jose Spiders	3	9	
Seattle Cascades	2	10	

==== South Division ====
Team	W	L	Qualifying position
Raleigh Flyers	10	2	South Division Final
Dallas Roughnecks	8	4	South Division Final
Atlanta Hustle	5	7	
Tampa Bay Cannons	4	8	
Austin Sol	3	9	

== All-Star Game ==
The inaugural AUDL All-Star game was held on June 8, 2019, at Breese Stevens Field in Madison, Wisconsin. The league opted not to go with conference all-star teams and instead utilized a draft format, with Rowan McDonnell of the DC Breeze and Kevin Petit-Scantling of the Madison Radicals serving as captains. It was regarded by those within the league as one of the highest-level games of Ultimate ever played. The game was televised live on Stadium as part of the network's deal with the league. Team KPS won 28 – 27 after being tied at the end of regulation and overtime, with Max Sheppard of the Pittsburgh Thunderbirds being named MVP. A 2020 edition of the game was later confirmed to be taking place in Washington, D. C.

== Postseason ==
=== Divisional playoff ===
Date	Division	Home	Goals	Goals	Away
7/20	Midwest Division	Pittsburgh Thunderbirds	21	20	Chicago Wildfire
7/20	East Division	Toronto Rush	22	21	DC Breeze

=== Divisional final ===
Date	Division	Home	Goals	Goals	Away
7/20	West Division	San Diego Growlers	25	21	Los Angeles Aviators
7/21	East Division	New York Empire	19	16	Toronto Rush
7/27	South Division	Raleigh Flyers	17	21	Dallas Roughnecks
7/27	Midwest Division	Indianapolis AlleyCats	23	17	Pittsburgh Thunderbirds

The Indianapolis AlleyCats advanced to their first Championship Weekend since the inaugural season of the AUDL in 2012.

=== Championship Weekend 8 ===
Championship Weekend 8 took place at Foothill College in San Jose, California from August 10–11, 2019.

Date	Match	Seed	Team	Goals	Goals	Team	Seed
8/10	Semifinal	1	New York Empire	17	15	Indianapolis AlleyCats	4
8/10	Semifinal	2	Dallas Roughnecks	23	18	San Diego Growlers	3
8/11	Final	1	New York Empire	26	22	Dallas Roughnecks	2

The New York Empire won their first title, and Beau Kittredge won his fifth title overall. New York joined the 2016 Dallas Roughnecks and 2013 Toronto Rush as the only AUDL teams in history to finish a season undefeated.
