= 2015 American Ultimate Disc League season =

American Ultimate Disc League
- Season: 2015
- Champions: San Jose Spiders
- Highest scoring: Minnesota Wind Chill (45)

The 2015 American Ultimate Disc League season was the fourth season for the league. Each team played a 14-game schedule. The San Jose Spiders won the AUDL Championship over the Madison Radicals at Avaya Stadium in San Jose, California. The Spiders won the championship despite entering the final four with the lowest seed after a regular-season finish of 10–4.

== Offseason ==
- The Ottawa Outlaws, the Los Angeles Aviators, the Atlanta Hustle, The Raleigh Flyers, the Jacksonville Cannons, the Charlotte Express, the Nashville Nightwatch, the Pittsburgh Thunderbirds, and the San Diego Growlers joined the league as the 18th, 19th, 20th, 21st, 22nd, 23rd, 24th, 25th, and 26th franchises.
- The Seattle Raptors changed their name to the Seattle Cascades
- The Salt Lake Lions went on hiatus

== Regular season standings ==
=== East Division ===
Team	W	L	PD
T- Toronto Rush	13	1	+136
P- New York Empire	11	3	+60
P- Montreal Royal	9	5	10
Ottawa Outlaws	7	7	13
DC Breeze	7	7	-14
Philadelphia Phoenix	1	13	-89
Rochester Dragons	1	13	-116

=== Midwest Division ===
Team	W	L	T	PD
T- Madison Radicals	13	1	0	+128
P- Pittsburgh Thunderbirds	12	2	0	+116
P- Chicago Wildfire	8	5	1	+60
Indianapolis AlleyCats	7	7	0	+34
Minnesota Wind Chill	6	7	1	-11
Cincinnati Revolution	2	12	0	-117
Detroit Mechanix	0	14	0	-210

The Chicago Wildfire and Minnesota Wind Chill had one tie in a weather-shortened game.

=== West Division ===
Team	W	L	PD
T- San Jose Spiders	10	4	+26
P- Seattle Cascades	8	6	+42
P- SF FlameThrowers	8	6	+11
San Diego Growlers	7	7	-14
Los Angeles Aviators	5	9	-28
Vancouver Riptide	4	10	-37

=== South Division ===
Team	W	L	PD
T- Raleigh Flyers	11	3	+60
P- Jacksonville Cannons	10	4	+30
Atlanta Hustle	10	4	+45
Nashville Nightwatch	2	12	-58
Charlotte Express	2	12	-76

T indicates top seed in the playoffs. P indicates a team advanced to the playoffs. PD indicates point difference. The Jacksonville Cannons advanced to the playoffs because they won the head-to-head regular-season series with the Atlanta Hustle. Only two playoff spots were allocated to the newer and smaller South Division.

== Playoffs ==
Play-in Games
E2	New York	33
E3	Montreal	20
W2	Seattle	21
W3	San Francisco	19
M2	Pittsburgh	24 (OT)
M3	Chicago	23

Divisional Finals
E1	Toronto	25
E2	New York	19
W1	San Jose	21
W2	Seattle	19
M1	Madison	24
M2	Pittsburgh	21
S1	Raleigh	28 (2OT)
S2	Jacksonville	27

Semifinals
1*	Toronto	20
4	San Jose	25
2	Madison	22
3	Raleigh	19

AUDL Championship
4	San Jose	17
2	Madison	15

*Semifinal match-ups were determined by seeds based on regular season records.

== All-AUDL Season Awards ==
=== First Team ===
- Justin Allen, Raleigh Flyers
- Tyler DeGirolamo, Pittsburgh Thunderbirds
- Mischa Freystaetter, Jacksonville Cannons
- Beau Kittredge, San Jose Spiders
- Isaiah Masek-Kelly, Toronto Rush
- Brett Matzuka, Chicago Wildfire
- Jimmy Mickle, San Diego Growlers

=== Second Team ===
- Kevin Underhill, Vancouver Riptide
- Keenan Plew, Indianapolis AlleyCats
- Andrew Meshnick, Madison Radicals
- Marcelo Sanchez, San Jose Spiders
- Derek Alexander, Ottawa Outlaws
- Simon Higgins, San Jose Spiders
- Yoland Cabot, Montreal Royal

=== Division Teams ===
East

- Isaiah Masek-Kelly, Toronto Rush
- Derek Alexander, Ottawa Outlaws
- Ryan Drost, New York Empire
- Jeff Lindquist, Toronto Rush
- Yoland Cabot, Montreal Royal
- Andrew Carroll, Toronto Rush
- Kevin Groulx, Montreal Royal

Midwest

- Tyler DeGirolamo, Pittsburgh Thunderbirds
- Andrew Meshnick, Madison Radicals
- Brett Matzuka, Chicago Wildfire
- Jonathan Helton, Chicago Wildfire
- Keenan Plew, Indianapolis AlleyCats
- Andrew Brown, Madison Radicals
- Ben Jagt, Minnesota Wind Chill

South

- Mischa Freystaetter, Jacksonville Cannons
- Justin Allen, Raleigh Flyers
- Matt Smith, Atlanta Hustle
- Jarrett Bowen, Raleigh Flyers
- Tom Radcliffe, Nashville NightWatch
- Micah Hood, Charlotte Express
- Paul Lally, Nashville NightWatch

West

- Jimmy Mickle, San Diego Growlers
- Beau Kittredge, San Jose Spiders
- Matt Rehder, Seattle Cascades
- Lucas Dallmann, San Francisco FlameThrowers
- Gagan Chatha, Vancouver Riptide
- Ashlin Joye, San Jose Spiders
- Simon Higgins, San Jose Spiders

== See also ==
- UltiAnalytics AUDL team and player statistics
