= Seattle Cascades (ultimate) =

Ultimate team based in Seattle, USA

- Founded: 2014
- League: Ultimate Frisbee Association
- Division: West
- Based in: Seattle, Washington
- Stadium: Interbay Stadium
- Colors: Blue
- Website: watchufa.com/cascades

The Seattle Cascades are a professional ultimate team based in Seattle, Washington. The Cascades compete in the Ultimate Frisbee Association (UFA) as a member of the West Division. The team is named after the mountain range that runs through the Pacific Northwest; its mascot is a Sasquatch named Casey.

The club first competed in 2015 as an open AUDL team, and added a mixed roster in 2017 and a women's roster in 2018. They also compete as a mixed squad in various exhibition games. The women's team, which competes in the Western Ultimate League (WUL), changed its name to the Seattle Tempest in 2020.

== AUDL team (open roster) ==
During the season, the Cascades play 12 regular season games, with up to four post-season games dependent on results.

In its inaugural season in 2015, the team placed 2nd in the AUDL West Division, losing in the final round of the playoffs to eventual champion San Jose Spiders. In 2016 the team beat the San Francisco FlameThrowers to win the West Division and advance to AUDL Championship Weekend in Madison, Wisconsin. There the Cascades staged a victory against the hometown favorite Madison Radicals and advanced to the championship game, where they lost to the undefeated Dallas Roughnecks. In 2017, the Cascades placed third in the West Division and did not qualify for the divisional playoff. In 2018, they placed fifth (last) in the West Division and did not qualify for the divisional playoff. In 2019, they again placed last (fourth) in the West Division and did not quality for the divisional playoff. The 2020 AUDL season was canceled due to the COVID-19 pandemic.

== Mixed roster ==
The Cascades mixed gender roster includes players from both the open and women's rosters. This roster competes in periodic mixed showcase competitions, such as the annual Cascades Cup in Seattle. The first Cascades Cup was held in 2017 and was attended by more than 850 people; the San Francisco Flamethrowers mixed roster defeated the Seattle Cascades 17-16. This event provided motivation for the Cascades to commit to creating more playing opportunities for women beginning in the 2018 season.

They have also competed internationally: they defeated Melbourne Ellipsis in 2019.
