= New York Empire (UFA) =

Ultimate team

- Sport: Ultimate
- Founded: 2013
- League: Ultimate Frisbee Association
- Division: East
- Based in: Mount Vernon, New York
- Stadium: The Stadium at Memorial Field
- Owners: NY Empire AUDL, LLC, Paul Stevens, Cullen Shaw, Jesse Stein, Tom Gibbons, & Nathan Shurtleff
- Head coach: Anthony Nuñez and Matthew Stevens
- Overall record: 142–55
- Championships: 3 (2019, 2022, 2023)
- Division titles: 4 (2018, 2019, 2022, 2023)
- Playoff berths: 12
- Website: watchufa.com/empire

The New York Empire are a professional ultimate team based in the New York metropolitan area. The Empire compete in the Ultimate Frisbee Association (UFA) as a member of the East Division. The team played its first season in 2013. The Empire won their first title in 2019, followed by titles in 2022 and 2023.

== History ==
At the beginning of the Empire's history in late 2012, the team almost did not come to fruition, as part-owner Cullen Shaw almost took his Ultimate ownership interest to Major League Ultimate because of a pending AUDL lawsuit against the Connecticut Constitution and Rhode Island Rampage. However, Shaw kept with the AUDL and the Empire because of lower ownership costs and more abilities as a team owner. The Empire's first tryout, in January 2013, attracted 60 players, more than other teams holding initial tryouts. The MLU did eventually create a New York franchise, the New York Rumble, and the Empire became the first AUDL team to have a player play for an AUDL and MLU team in the same year when Isaac Saul joined the Empire in 2014 after the conclusion of the Rumble season that same year.

After the 2017 season, Barbara Stevens, mother of then-Empire player Matthew Stevens, became majority owner of the team. Before the 2018 season, the Empire signed Beau Kittredge and Marques Brownlee, and before 2019, the Empire signed Jack Williams and Grant Lindsley. These signings, combined with existing talent like Jeff Babbitt and Ben Jagt, created a team that some called the strongest in the league since the 2016 iteration of the Dallas Roughnecks. The Empire then went 12–0 in the regular season after close calls with Raleigh and DC, and went 3–0 in the playoffs to win the 2019 championship and become only the third team in league history to finish a season undefeated.

== Stadium ==
The Empire formerly played its home games at MCU Park in the borough of Brooklyn, with some contests being played on Randall's Island. Before the 2018 season, the Empire moved to Joseph F. Fosina Field in New Rochelle, citing a lack of locker rooms and concessions at Randall's Island as well as better proximity to major thoroughways.

In the 2024 season, the team played two home matches at Trinity Health Stadium in Hartford, Connecticut.

== Record ==
Year	Reg. season	Playoffs	Finish
2013	11–5 (2nd in East)	1–1	Lost in Semifinals
2014	10–4 (2nd in East)	1–1	Lost in Semifinals
2015	11–3 (2nd in East)	1–1	Lost in Divisional Final
2016	7–7 (3rd in East)	0–1	Lost in Divisional Semifinals
2017	6–8 (4th in East)		Did not make playoffs
2018	8–6 (3rd in East)	2–1	Lost in Semifinals
2019	12–0 (1st in East)	3–0	Won Championship
2021	10–2	2–1	Lost in Championship
2022	12–0 (1st in East)	3–0	Won Championship
2023	12–0 (1st in East)	3–0	Won Championship
2024	8–4 (3rd in East)	0–1	Lost in Divisional Semifinals
2025	8–5 (3rd in East)	0–1	Lost in Divisional Semifinals
2026	10–2 (2nd in East)	2–1	Lost in Semifinals
Total	125–46	18–9	

Sporting positions
Preceded by Madison Radicals	{{{title}}} 2019	Succeeded by Current
