= Dallas Legion =

Ultimate frisbee team in Texas, US

- Sport: Ultimate
- Founded: 2015
- League: Ultimate Frisbee Association
- Division: South
- Based in: Dallas, Texas
- Stadium: Jesuit College Preparatory School of Dallas
- Head Coach: Darius Tse
- Championships: 1 (2016)
- Division titles: 2 (2016, 2018)
- Website: www.dallaslegion.com

The Dallas Legion, formerly the Dallas Roughnecks, were a professional ultimate team that competed in the South Division of the Ultimate Frisbee Association (UFA). Founded in 2015, the team played their first year in the 2016 AUDL season, wherein they won the championship title.

== History ==
In June 2014, it was reported that American Ultimate Disc League franchise rights had been sold for Dallas, which would come to the league in 2016. Over a year later, it was revealed that Ultimate insider Jim Gerencser had bought the rights and named the team the Roughnecks. Gerencser proceeded to build one of the best expansion teams in AUDL history, including signing Beau Kittredge from the established San Jose Spiders. The Roughnecks won the AUDL championship in their first year, completing a perfect season.

The Roughnecks were knocked out of the 2017 AUDL playoffs during the semifinal game against the Toronto Rush.

In the Roughnecks' third season, they won the South Division and once again advanced to the championship game which they lost to the Madison Radicals in Madison. They experienced a similar scenario in 2019, eliminating the San Diego Growlers in the semifinal before falling to the New York Empire in the championship game with a total score of 22-26.

In 2021 the Roughnecks finished 2nd in the West Division at 8-4 and lost to the San Diego Growlers in the first round. In December 2021, the Roughnecks announced that they were rebranding as the Dallas Legion.

== Record ==
Year	Reg. season	Playoffs	Finish
2016	14-0 (1st in South)	3-0	Won championship
2017	11-3 (2nd in South)	1-1	Lost in semifinals
2018	13-1 (1st in South)	2-1	Lost in championship final
2019	8-4 (2nd in South)	2-1	Lost in championship final
2021	8-4 (2nd in West)	0-1	Lost in quarterfinals
Total	54-12	8-4	

Sporting positions
Preceded by San Jose Spiders	{{{title}}} 2016	Succeeded by San Francisco FlameThrowers
