= Nashville NightWatch =

- Founded: 2015
- Folded: 2018
- Division: South
- Based in: Nashville, Tennessee
- Colours: Black, Red, White
- Website: nashvillenightwatch.com

The Nashville NightWatch were a professional ultimate team from Nashville, Tennessee playing in the South Division of the American Ultimate Disc League. The team was founded in 2015 and folded after the 2018 season.

== History ==
=== Breaking gender barriers ===
The Raleigh Flyers made news in 2015 by signing the first ever female professional ultimate player, Jessi Jones, to play in their game against the Nashville NightWatch as part of "Women's Ultimate Day". The NightWatch went a step further in 2017 by rostering Jesse Shofner from the beginning of the season. Shofner subsequently scored two goals in the NightWatch's first game of the 2017 season, making her the first woman to do so in any AUDL game.

=== Closing ===
An American Ultimate Disc League announcement on November 21, 2018, stated that the NightWatch had folded, with owner David Trett aiming for a return to the league after a time of increased player development.

== Record ==
Year	Record	Rank in Division
2015	2-12	4
2016	3-11	7

== 2017 schedule ==
2017 Regular Season Results
Date	Opponent	Score	Record
4/1/2017	@ JAX	23-40 (L)	0-1
4/15/2017	vs. ATL	27-37 (L)	0-2
4/23/2017	vs. JAX	11-14 (L)	0-3
4/29/2017	vs. DAL	8-27 (L)	0-4
5/6/2017	@ DAL	23-32 (L)	0-5
5/7/2017	@ AUS	11-31 (L)	0-6
5/13/2017	@ ATL	19-31 (L)	0-7
6/3/2017	vs. AUS	24-28 (L)	0-8
6/10/2017	@ RAL	20-32 (L)	0-9
6/18/2017	vs. RAL	PPD to 7/8	
7/1/2017	vs. AUS	21-27 (L)	0-10
7/8/2017	vs. RAL	14-24 (L)	0-11
7/8/2017	vs. RAL	26-31 (L)	0-12
7/14/2017	@ ATL	22-27 (L)	0-13
7/15/2017	@ JAX	24-33 (L)	0-14
