= Jeff Babbitt =

American Ultimate Frisbee Player

Personal information
- Born: 19 March 1994 (age 32)
- Height: 1.88 m (6 ft 2 in)

Sport
- Position: Defender
- Team: Boston Glory

Jeff Babbitt (born 19 March 1994) is an American professional ultimate frisbee player who plays for Boston Glory in the UFA. He is known for winning the UFA MVP award two consecutive times and winning the UFA championships three times with New York Empire and once with Boston Glory.

== Ultimate Career ==
After graduating from University of Massachusetts Amherst in kinesiology in May 2016, Babbitt began his professional career in the UFA with New York Empire in 2016. During his time with the team, he won the UFA championship three times (2019, 2022 and 2023). In 2023, he was awarded with the league’s Most Valuable Player (MVP) award.

In 2024, after his contract with New York was not renewed, Babbitt joined Boston Glory for the 2024 and 2025 seasons. He won his second consecutive league MVP award in 2024, his first season with Boston. In October 2024 he was ranked as one of the top Ultimate players. In 2025, he won the Championship with Boston Glory.
