= Vegas Bighorns =

American professional ultimate team

Vegas Bighorn
- Sport: Ultimate frisbee
- Founded: 2025
- League: Ultimate Frisbee Association
- Division: West
- Based in: Las Vegas, Nevada
- Stadium: Bonanza High School
- Colors: Brown, Black, and White
- Head coach: Matt Bode
- Website: watchufa.com/bighorns

The Vegas Bighorns are a professional ultimate team based in Las Vegas, Nevada. The Bighorns compete in the Ultimate Frisbee Association (UFA) as a member of the West Division. They play home games at Bonanza High School.

== History ==
=== Founding and inaugural season ===
The 2025 season marked the inaugural season for the Bighorns. Their home games would be played at Bonanza High School. The Bighorns ended the 2025 season winless at 0-12, last in their division, the worst record in the league that season, sitting at the bottom of the UFA in nearly every major statistical category except huck attempts and blocks.

== Season-by-season results ==
Year	Regular Season Record	Divisional Finish Place	Playoffs Result
2025	0-12	6th	Did not qualify
2026	0-12	6th	Did not qualify

== Stats and records ==
=== All-time leaders ===
- Goals: 28 goals - Braden Distel
- Assists: 21 assists - Mason Zetsch
- Blocks: 21 blocks - Braden Distel
- Completions: 288 completions - Connor Garrison
- Points Played: 403 points played - Braden Distel

=== Single season leaders ===
- Goals: 21 goals - Brad Ellis (2025) & Braden Distel (2026)
- Assists: 20 assists - Ryan Hiser (2025)
- Blocks: 11 blocks - Braden Distel (2025)
- Completions: 282 completions - Connor Garrison (2026)
- Points Played: 222 points played - Connor Garrison (2026)
