= Vancouver Riptide =

Ultimate frisbee team

The Vancouver Riptide was a semi-professional ultimate team that competed in American Ultimate Disc League which started playing in the 2013 season. They played their home games at Swangard Stadium, in Burnaby, British Columbia. The team ended play at the end of the 2017 season. It then moved to Portland, Oregon for the 2020 season due to a lack of attendance and sponsorship.
