= Montreal Royal (UFA) =

Professional ultimate franchise based in Montreal, Quebec, Canada

- Sport: Ultimate frisbee
- Founded: 2013
- League: Ultimate Frisbee Association
- Division: East
- Based in: Montreal, Quebec
- Stadium: Claude-Robillard Sports Complex
- Colours: Blue, orange, and white
- Owner: Jean-Levy Champagne, Patrick Gratton, Christian Mathieu, Jean-Phillippe Riopel, Manuel Herreras, Éric Desrosiers, Marie-France Denoncourt, Audrey Ayotte
- Head coach: Caroline Cadotte
- Website: watchufa.com/royal

The Montreal Royal are a professional ultimate team based in Montreal, Quebec. The Royal compete in the Ultimate Frisbee Association (UFA) as a member of the East Division. The team was the second Canadian franchise to join the UFA – originally branded as the American Ultimate Disc League (AUDL) – after the Toronto Rush. The Royal play their home games at Claude-Robillard Sports Complex in Montreal. They played their inaugural game on April 19, 2014, where they hosted the Toronto Rush and lost by a score of 22–14. In this game, the Royal broke the UFA attendance record previously held by the Rush with more than 3,000 fans. The team name has several references: a spring Association de Ultimate de Montréal league team called Royal that the co-owners play on, the Montreal hill Mount Royal, and a nod to the former minor league professional baseball team Montreal Royals.
