= San Diego Growlers =

Ultimate Frisbee Association team in San Diego, California

- Sport: Ultimate
- Founded: 2014
- League: Ultimate Frisbee Association
- Division: West
- Based in: San Diego, California
- Stadium: Mission Bay High School
- Head Coach: Kevin Stuart, Kaela Helton
- Playoff berths: 3 (2018, 2019, 2021)
- Website: watchufa.com/growlers

The San Diego Growlers are a professional ultimate team based in San Diego, California. The Growlers compete in the Ultimate Frisbee Association (UFA) as a member of the West Division. The team plays its home games at Mission Bay High School. The Growlers began play in the 2015 season.

== History ==
The AUDL (now the UFA) officially announced the Growlers as an expansion team in October 2014. The team's name has a dual meaning as a reference to both the animal and the local craft beer scene.

In 2018, the Growlers advanced to the AUDL playoffs for the first time, falling to division rival, the Los Angeles Aviators in the West Division finals. A rivalry quickly formed with the Los Angeles Aviators, the closest team to the Growlers, which was also established before the 2015 season.

In 2019, two-time AUDL MVP Goose Helton joined the team after playing with the Raleigh Flyers (now the Carolina Flyers) in 2018. The Growlers finished with a 10–2 regular season record to clinch the top seed in the West Division playoffs. The team hosted the Aviators, defeating them in the playoffs to secure their first AUDL playoff win and a Championship Weekend appearance in San Jose. San Diego would eventually lose in the semi-finals to the Dallas Roughnecks. (now the Dallas Legion)

The 2020 season was eventually canceled due to the global pandemic, however, the AUDL West Division underwent realignment with the addition of the Dallas Roughnecks and the Austin Sol.

In 2021, the Growlers won the regular season title with another 10–2 record. The team hosted and defeated the Dallas Roughnecks in the West Division Championship game to advance to AUDL Championship Weekend in Washington, DC. San Diego would eventually lose in the semi-finals to the 2019 AUDL Champion New York Empire.
