= San Francisco FlameThrowers =

- Founded: 2014
- Folded: 2018
- League: American Ultimate Disc League
- Division: West
- Based in: Oakland, California
- Stadium: Laney College Football Field
- Colours: Orange, black, and white
- Championships: 1 (2017)
- Website: sfflamethrowers.com

The San Francisco FlameThrowers were a professional ultimate team based in the San Francisco Bay Area, competing in the West Division of the American Ultimate Disc League. The team was founded in 2014 as part of the league's west coast expansion. In 2017, the FlameThrowers won the AUDL Championship game, with a final score of 30-29 against the Toronto Rush. The team folded after the 2018 season, but retained the rights to the FlameThrower brand, hinting at a potential rebirth as a women's team.
