= Atlanta Hustle =

- Sport: Ultimate frisbee
- Founded: 2015
- League: Ultimate Frisbee Association
- Division: South
- Based in: DeKalb County, Georgia
- Stadium: Atlanta Silverbacks Park
- Colors: Purple, black, white and orange
- Head coach: Miranda Knowles
- Overall record: 45–40
- Website: www.atlantahustle.com

The Atlanta Hustle are a professional ultimate team based in the Atlanta metropolitan area. The Hustle compete in the Ultimate Frisbee Association (UFA) as a member of the South Division.

== 2015 season ==
The Hustle finished the season 10–4 and tied for second in the division with the Jacksonville Cannons, both behind the Raleigh Flyers. The Cannons possessed a head-to-head tie breaker with the Hustle and thereby advanced to play the Flyers in the first round of the divisional playoffs on July 25, 2015. Raleigh won the one game playoff and advanced to represent the South Division in the AUDL's championship weekend on August 8–9, 2015.

2015 regular season results
Date	Opponent	Score	Record
4/11/2015	@ Raleigh Flyers	21–29 (L)	0–1
4/12/2015	@ Charlotte Express	27–25 (W)	1–1
4/18/2015	@ Nashville Nightwatch	23–17 (W)	2–1
4/26/2015	vs Jacksonville Cannons	23–20 (W)	3–1
5/03/2015	vs Nashville Nightwatch	30–20 (W)	4–1
5/09/2015	vs Raleigh Flyers	29–28 (W)	5–1
5/16/2015	@ Jacksonville Cannons	22–26 (L)	5–2
5/23/2015	BYE	N/A	5–2
5/29/2015	vs Charlotte Express	26–18 (W)	6–2
6/05/2015	vs Raleigh Flyers	24–20 (W)	7–2
6/14/2015	@ Nashville Nightwatch	25–21 (W)	8–2
6/20/2015	@ Jacksonville Cannons	27–29 (L)	8–3
6/27/2015	@ Charlotte Express	26–13 (W)	9–3
7/04/2015	vs Jacksonville Cannons	21–24 (L)	9–4
7/11/2015	vs Nashville Nightwatch	28–18 (W)	10–4
7/18/2015	BYE	N/A	10–4

== 2016 season ==
The South Division added two new teams before the 2016 season, the Austin Sol and the Dallas Roughnecks.

== Color of Ultimate ==
The Hustle, along with the Atlanta Soul, sponsored and supported the first Color of Ultimate game, a mixed showcase game held in Atlanta on June 22, 2019. The Color of Ultimate games are a project of the Atlanta Flying Disc Club (AFDC) Project Diversity initiative aimed at raising the profiles of elite ultimate players of color from around the world.

The Color of Ultimate: ATL game was the first Color of Ultimate showcase game. According to AFDC Project Diversity, "the goal of the game was to bring awareness about the socioeconomic and racial inequity of the sport of ultimate. The game highlighted elite players of color from around the world, brought awareness to the racial and socioeconomic inequities of ultimate, and exposed the sport to those outside of our community encouraging more people of color to play ultimate." The Color of Ultimate: ATL featured almost 50 players of color from across the United States and Colombia. The two teams were coached by Jason Simpson and Tuba Benson-Jaja, two prominent players and coaches of color. Team Tuba defeated Team Simpson 20–19 in overtime. A catch made by Team Tuba player Delrico Johnson was selected for the ESPN SportsCenter top 10 plays of the day. The game had a widely positive reception. The showcase game was followed by a conversation about steps the sport can take to increase its diversity. A documentary was produced with the support of USA Ultimate about the game and its impact on players, spectators, and their communities.

It was followed by a second beach ultimate game sponsored in part by the American Ultimate Disc League and produced in partnership with the LA Throwback beach ultimate tournament in Santa Monica, California in January 2020.
