= Toronto Rush =

Canadian ultimate frisbee team

- Sport: Ultimate
- Founded: 2013
- League: Ultimate Frisbee Association
- Division: East
- Based in: Toronto, Ontario
- Stadium: Varsity Stadium (2013-2017; 2019-present); Monarch Park Stadium (2018); Lamport Stadium) (1st half of 2024)
- Colours
- Owner: Jim Lloyd
- Head coach: Adrian Yearwood
- Championships: 1 (2013)
- Division titles: 6
- Playoff berths: 7
- Website: watchufa.com/rush

The Toronto Rush are a professional ultimate team based in Toronto, Ontario. The Rush compete in the Ultimate Frisbee Association (UFA) as a member of the East Division.

The Rush joined the UFA in the 2013 season – when it was originally branded as the American Ultimate Disc League – becoming the first Canadian team in the league. They played their home games at Varsity Stadium and went undefeated that year, continuing their streak into the playoffs to take home the 2013 UFA Championship in their introductory season.

The Rush franchise has been consistent. The Rush won five consecutive East Division titles and have made three appearances in the League Championship Finals, including one UFA title in 2013.

The team relocated their home games to Monarch Park Stadium for the 2018 season, before moving back to Varsity Stadium.

Robert Lloyd is the chairman of the Rush. For the 2023 season, their head coach is Adrian Yearwood. Their assistant coaches are Micheal Kukucska and Rob Jankowski.

The team played the 1st half of their 2024 home schedule at Lamport Stadium while their regular home stadium Varsity Stadium was undergoing renovations.

== Record ==
Year	Reg. season	Finish	Playoffs
2013	16-0	1st East	Won Championship
2014	13-1	1st East	Lost in Championship
2015	13-1	1st East	Lost in Semifinals
2016	12-2	1st East	Lost in Semifinals
2017	8-3	1st East	Lost in Championship
2018	13-1	1st East	Lost in Division Final
2019	7-5	2nd East	Lost in Divisional Final
2020	Season canceled	N/A	N/A
2021	3-6	2nd Canada Cup	
2022	4-8	6th East	Failed to Qualify
2023	5-7	5th East	Failed to Qualify
2024	1-11	6th East	Failed to Qualify
2025	3-9	6th East	Failed to Qualify
2026	6-6	4th East	Failed to Qualify
