= 2016 American Ultimate Disc League season =

- League: American Ultimate Disc League
- Sport: Ultimate
- Duration: April 23 – August 7, 2016
- Games: 14
- Teams: 26
- TV partner: ESPN3

Regular season

Postseason
- East Division champions: Toronto Rush
- Midwest Division champions: Madison Radicals
- West Division champions: Seattle Cascades
- South Division champions: Dallas Roughnecks

Finals
- Champions: Seattle Cascades

AUDL seasons
- ← 2015 2017 →

The 2016 American Ultimate Disc League season was the fifth season for the league. The twenty-six teams were split into four regional divisions (East, Midwest, West and South), with each team playing a 14-game schedule. The second and third placed teams in each division advanced to a playoff match, with the winners facing the first placed team in their division. The winners of these matches advanced to the AUDL Championship Weekend, which featured semifinals and then a final for the AUDL Championship. The Dallas Roughnecks defeated the Seattle Cascades 33–27 in the final to become the 2016 AUDL Champions.

== Regular season ==
Rules for classification: 1) points; 2) head-to-head points; 3) head-to-head point difference.
(C) Division champion, (Q) Qualified for the division playoffs

=== East Division ===
Team	W	L	PD	Qualifying position
Toronto Rush (C) (Q)	12	2	+100	East Division Final
DC Breeze (Q)	10	4	+65	East Division Playoff
New York Empire (Q)	7	7	+32	East Division Playoff
Ottawa Outlaws	7	7	+2	
Montreal Royal	6	8	−33	
Philadelphia Phoenix	0	14	−166	

Team	DC	MTL	NY	OTT	PHI	TOR
DC Breeze	—N/a	2–1; 26–18; 28–14; 22–27	3–0; *23–22; 15–14; **27–26	1–1; 28–17; 22–27	3–0; 24–15; 34–18; 27–16	1–2; 24–25**; 23–24; 28–23
Montreal Royal	1–2; 18–26; 14–28; 27–22	—N/a	1–1; 19–21; 12–17	1–2; 24–31; 27–30; 21–20	3–0; 25–17; 21–18; 27–19	1–2; 31–27; 18–29; 14–26
New York Empire	0–3; 22–23*; 14–15; 26–27**	1–1; 21–19; 17–12	—N/a	2–1; 24–19; 23–21; 19–24	3–0; 28–16; 32–17; 28–13	0–3; 14–22; 21–27; 20–22*
Ottawa Outlaws	1–1; 17–28; 27–22	2–1; 31–24; 30–27; 20–21	1–2; 19–24; 21–23; 24–19	—N/a	3–0; 25–13; 30–22; 37–16	0–3; 15–32; 24–30; 20–35
Philadelphia Phoenix	0–3; 15–24; 18–34; 16–27	0–3; 17–25; 18–21; 19–27	0–3; 16–28; 17–32; 13–28	0–3; 13–25; 20–30; 16–37	—N/a	0–2; 16–24; 6–28
Toronto Rush	2–1; **25–24; 24–23; 23–28	2–1; 27–31; 29–18; 26–14	3–0; 22–14; 27–21; *22–20	3–0; 32–15; 30–24; 35–20	2–0; 24–16; 28–6	—N/a

* Overtime win

** Second overtime win

=== Midwest Division ===
Team	W	L	PD	Qualifying position
Madison Radicals (C) (Q)	14	0	+136	Midwest Division Final
Pittsburgh Thunderbirds (Q)	10	4	+61	Midwest Division Playoff
Minnesota Wind Chill (Q)	9	5	−26	Midwest Division Playoff
Indianapolis AlleyCats	8	6	+44	
Chicago Wildfire	4	10	−34	
Detroit Mechanix	4	10	−79	
Cincinnati Revolution	0	14	−102	

=== West Division ===
Team	W	L	PD	Qualifying position
San Francisco FlameThrowers (C) (Q)	11	3	+52	West Division Final
Seattle Cascades (Q)	9	5	+16	West Division Playoff
Los Angeles Aviators (Q)	9	5	+21	West Division Playoff
Vancouver Riptide	6	8	−8	
San Jose Spiders	5	9	−27	
San Diego Growlers	2	12	−54	

=== South Division ===
Team	W	L	PD	Qualifying position
Dallas Roughnecks (C) (Q)	14	0	+134	South Division Final
Raleigh Flyers (Q)	9	5	+11	South Division Playoff
Atlanta Hustle (Q)	7	7	−2	South Division Playoff
Austin Sol	7	7	+26	
Jacksonville Cannons	5	9	−20	
Charlotte Express	4	10	−59	
Nashville Nightwatch	3	11	−90	

== Postseason ==
Regional semifinal matches were played on July 16, with regional finals taking place on July 17 and July 23. Matches for the AUDL Semifinals were decided based on the seeding of teams from their results during the season.

Division Playoffs
DC	24
New York	20
Pittsburgh	20
Minnesota	18
Seattle	31
Los Angeles	23
Raleigh	23
Atlanta	25

Division Finals
Toronto	23*
DC	21
Madison	20
Pittsburgh	16
San Francisco	17
Seattle	23
Dallas	28
Atlanta	21

AUDL Championship Semifinals
Toronto	20
Dallas	27
Seattle	26
Madison	25

AUDL Championship
Seattle	27
Dallas	33

* Overtime win

=== Division Playoffs ===
Postponed

July 16, 2016
18:30 ET
East Division

New York Empire	20–24	DC Breeze
(6–6, 4–8, 6–5, 4–5)
4 goals Kevin Norton	Boxscore	5 goals John Helton
5 assists John Wodatch		5 assists Markham Shofner

Gallaudet University, Washington, D.C.
Players of the game:
NY: John Wodatch (+7)
DC: Alan Kolick, Brian Marshall (+5)

July 16, 2016
19:00 ET
Midwest Division

Minnesota Wind Chill	18–20	Pittsburgh Thunderbirds
(3–6, 5–5, 5–5, 5–4)
2 goals Six players	Boxscore	5 goals David Vatz
7 assists Ben Jagt		5 assists Alex Thorne

Highmark Stadium, Pittsburgh, PA
Attendance: 750
Players of the game:
MIN: Ben Jagt (+6)
PIT: David Vatz (+6)

July 16, 2016
19:30 ET
South Division

Atlanta Hustle	P–P	Raleigh Flyers

Cardinal Gibbons High School, Raleigh, NC

- Due to lightning strikes, the match was postponed until the next day.

July 16, 2016
19:30 PT
West Division

Seattle Cascades	31–23	Los Angeles Aviators
(8–1, 9–4, 9–9, 5–9)
7 goals Mark Burton	Boxscore	6 goals Bryan Nguyen
7 assists Phil Murray		5 assists Eric Lissner

Occidental College, Los Angeles, CA
Players of the game:
SEA: Nick Stuart (+10)
LA: Eli Friedman, Eric Lissner (+6)

July 17, 2016
12:00 ET
South Division

Atlanta Hustle	25–23	Raleigh Flyers
(7–5, 5–8, 5–5, 8–5)
5 goals Anders Olsen	Boxscore	5 goals Terrence Mitchell
5 assists Dylan Tunnell		5 assists Brian Casey; Jonathan Nethercutt

Cardinal Gibbons High School, Raleigh, NC
Players of the game:
ATL: Nathan Vickroy (+7)
RAL: Brian Casey, Jonathan Nethercutt, Terrence Mitchell (+6)

=== Division Finals ===
July 17, 2016
14:00 PT
West Division

Seattle Cascades	23–17	San Francisco FlameThrowers
(3–3, 10–3, 6–6, 4–5)
4 goals Zane Rankin	Boxscore	2 goals Six players
5 assists Danny Karlinsky		5 assists Eli Kerns

Occidental College, Los Angeles, CA
Players of the game:
SEA: Mark Burton, Zane Rankin, Matthew Rehder (+5)
SF: Joel Schlachet (+5)

July 23, 2016
17:00 ET
East Division

DC Breeze	21–23 (OT)	Toronto Rush
(4–5, 6–6, 2–4, 7–4, 2–4)
7 goals Tom Doi	Boxscore	5 goals Steve Armitage
3 assists Matt Kerrigan		4 assists Andrew Carroll

Varsity Stadium, Toronto, Ontario, Canada
Players of the game:
DC: Tom Doi (+9)
TOR: Steve Armitage (+7)

July 23, 2016
18:00 CT
Midwest Division

Pittsburgh Thunderbirds	16–20	Madison Radicals
(4–5, 3–4, 6–5, 3–6)
3 goals David Vatz; Mike Ogren	Boxscore	4 goals Colin Camp; Peter Graffy
4 assists Pat Earles		3 assists Tom Annen; Jay Froude

Breese Stevens Field, Madison, WI
Players of the game:
PIT: David Vatz (+4)
MAD: Colin Camp (+6)

- Due to lightning strikes, the start was delayed until 20:35 CT

July 23, 2016
19:00 CT
South Division

Atlanta Hustle	21–28	Dallas Roughnecks
(4–3, 4–8, 8–6, 5–11)
3 goals Anders Olsen; Matt Smith	Boxscore	3 goals Six players
3 assists Max Leonard; Dylan Tunnell		5 assists Jimmy Mickle

Five Star Soccer Complex, The Colony, TX
Players of the game:
ATL: Sam Little (+5)
DAL: Brandon Malecek (+6)

=== AUDL Championship Weekend ===
==== Semifinals ====
August 6, 2016
16:00 CT
Semifinal #1

Toronto Rush	20–27	Dallas Roughnecks
(4–8, 4–6, 6–7, 6–6)
4 goals Jonathan Martin	Boxscore	6 goals Kurt Gibson
4 assists Anatoly Vasilyev		5 assists Chris Mazur

Breese Stevens Field, Madison, WI
Players of the game:
TOR: Jonathan Martin (+5)
DAL: Dalton Smith (+9)

August 6, 2016
19:00 CT
Semifinal #2

Seattle Cascades	26–25	Madison Radicals
(3–6, 7–9, 9–6, 7–4)
	Boxscore	5 goals Dave Wiseman
		3 assists Four players

Breese Stevens Field, Madison, WI
MAD: Dave Wiseman, Pat Shriwise (+6)

==== Final ====
August 7, 2016
12:00 CT
Championship Game

Seattle Cascades	27–33	Dallas Roughnecks
	Boxscore

Breese Stevens Field, Madison, WI

== See also ==
- 2016 Major League Ultimate season
- UltiAnalytics AUDL team and player statistics
