= 2018 American Ultimate Disc League season =

- League: American Ultimate Disc League
- Sport: Ultimate
- Duration: March 31 – August 12, 2018
- Number of teams: 24
- TV partner(s): Stadium

Regular season

Postseason
- East Division champions: Toronto Rush
- Midwest Division champions: Madison Radicals
- West Division champions: Los Angeles Aviators
- South Division champions: Dallas Roughnecks

Finals
- Champions: Madison Radicals

AUDL seasons
- ← 2017 2019 →

The 2018 American Ultimate Disc League season was the seventh season for the league. The Madison Radicals won the championship, the team's first. Rowan McDonnell of the DC Breeze won league MVP after the season.

== Offseason ==
The Vancouver Riptide was the lone team to cease operations after 2017, with plans to move the team to Portland, Oregon and rejoin the league for the 2019 season. Stadium joined the AUDL as broadcast partner, replacing Eleven Sports Network. Stadium televised one game a week live as well as all three games during Championship Weekend VII.

== Regular season ==
=== Week 1 ===
Date	Home	Goals	Goals	Away
3/31	Detroit Mechanix	12	24	Indianapolis AlleyCats
3/31	Raleigh Flyers	27	22	Tampa Bay Cannons

=== Week 2 ===
Date	Home	Goals	Goals	Away
4/7	Seattle Cascades	29	28	Minnesota Wind Chill
4/7	Los Angeles Aviators	30	17	San Diego Growlers
4/7	Pittsburgh Thunderbirds	17	16	Detroit Mechanix
4/7	DC Breeze	22	24	Montreal Royal
4/7	San Francisco FlameThrowers	20	21	San Jose Spiders
4/7	Tampa Bay Cannons	15	17	Atlanta Hustle
4/7	Raleigh Flyers	14	17	Dallas Roughnecks
4/7	Indianapolis AlleyCats	13	20	Madison Radicals

=== Week 3 ===
Date	Home	Goals	Goals	Away
4/14	Pittsburgh Thunderbirds	15	20	Chicago Wildfire
4/14	Seattle Cascades	16	22	San Diego Growlers
4/14	New York Empire	14	18	Toronto Rush
4/14	Tampa Bay Cannons	17	20	Raleigh Flyers
4/14	San Jose Spiders	27	28	San Francisco FlameThrowers
4/14	Austin Sol	23	22	Los Angeles Aviators
4/15	Dallas Roughnecks	20	17	Los Angeles Aviators
4/15	Philadelphia Phoenix	18	19	Toronto Rush
4/15	Nashville NightWatch	17	18	Atlanta Hustle

=== Week 4 ===
Date	Home	Goals	Goals	Away
4/21	Detroit Mechanix	12	27	Madison Radicals
4/21	Minnesota Wind Chill	24	23	Chicago Wildfire
4/21	Indianapolis AlleyCats	27	18	Pittsburgh Thunderbirds
4/21	Philadelphia Phoenix	26	21	Montreal Royal
4/21	Atlanta Hustle	19	18	Tampa Bay Cannons
4/21	San Francisco FlameThrowers	18	28	Toronto Rush
4/21	New York Empire	28	16	Ottawa Outlaws
4/21	San Diego Growlers	26	25	Seattle Cascades
4/21	Nashville NightWatch	26	31	Raleigh Flyers
4/22	Dallas Roughnecks	23	21	Austin Sol
4/22	DC Breeze	26	19	Ottawa Outlaws
4/22	Los Angeles Aviators	25	16	San Jose Spiders

=== Week 5 ===
Date	Home	Goals	Goals	Away
4/27	Austin Sol	25	23	Raleigh Flyers
4/27	San Jose Spiders	18	17	San Diego Growlers
4/28	Ottawa Outlaws	33	35	Montreal Royal
4/28	Madison Radicals	29	13	Pittsburgh Thunderbirds
4/28	San Francisco FlameThrowers	21	25	San Diego Growlers
4/28	Philadelphia Phoenix	18	18	DC Breeze
4/28	Dallas Roughnecks	20	24	Raleigh Flyers
4/28	Tampa Bay Cannons	25	13	Nashville NightWatch
4/28	Chicago Wildfire	21	25	Indianapolis AlleyCats

=== Week 6 ===
Date	Home	Goals	Goals	Away
5/4	San Diego Growlers	31	28	San Jose Spiders
5/5	Montreal Royal	14	17	Philadelphia Phoenix
5/5	Minnesota Wind Chill	19	20	Madison Radicals
5/5	Detroit Mechanix	22	31	Indianapolis AlleyCats
5/5	Atlanta Hustle	22	23	Austin Sol
5/5	New York Empire	19	18	DC Breeze
5/5	Seattle Cascades	27	25	San Francisco FlameThrowers
5/5	Raleigh Flyers	23	20	Tampa Bay Cannons
5/5	Los Angeles Aviators	33	31	San Jose Spiders
5/6	Ottawa Outlaws	22	19	Philadelphia Phoenix
5/6	Nashville NightWatch	22	20	Austin Sol
5/6	Pittsburgh Thunderbirds	18	27	Indianapolis AlleyCats

=== Week 7 ===
Date	Home	Goals	Goals	Away
5/12	Minnesota Wind Chill	34	17	Detroit Mechanix
5/12	Chicago Wildfire	21	16	Pittsburgh Thunderbirds
5/12	Atlanta Hustle	27	26	Tampa Bay Cannons
5/12	DC Breeze	25	24	Raleigh Flyers
5/12	Austin Sol	23	27	Dallas Roughnecks
5/12	San Jose Spiders	23	26	San Francisco FlameThrowers
5/13	Madison Radicals	37	8	Detroit Mechanix
5/13	Montreal Royal	18	21	Toronto Rush
5/13	Seattle Cascades	26	30	Los Angeles Aviators
5/13	Indianapolis AlleyCats	27	24	Pittsburgh Thunderbirds

=== Week 8 ===
Date	Home	Goals	Goals	Away
5/18	San Francisco FlameThrowers	32	29	Seattle Cascades
5/19	Chicago Wildfire	16	24	Madison Radicals
5/19	Pittsburgh Thunderbirds	21	33	Minnesota Wind Chill
5/19	Toronto Rush	33	20	DC Breeze
5/19	San Diego Growlers	20	25	Los Angeles Aviators
5/19	San Jose Spiders	24	14	Seattle Cascades
5/19	New York Empire	23	15	Philadelphia Phoenix
5/19	Nashville NightWatch	32	30	Tampa Bay Cannons
5/19	Austin Sol	28	19	Atlanta Hustle
5/20	Detroit Mechanix	24	34	Minnesota Wind Chill
5/20	Dallas Roughnecks	26	21	Atlanta Hustle
5/20	Montreal Royal	21	20	DC Breeze
5/20	Toronto Rush	21	19	Ottawa Outlaws

=== Week 9 ===
Date	Home	Goals	Goals	Away
5/26	Toronto Rush	28	23	Philadelphia Phoenix
5/26	Los Angeles Aviators	25	23	San Diego Growlers
5/26	DC Breeze	29	21	New York Empire
5/26	Madison Radicals	16	24	Raleigh Flyers
5/26	Indianapolis AlleyCats	26	22	Chicago Wildfire
5/26	Nashville NightWatch	27	21	Austin Sol
5/27	Ottawa Outlaws	30	18	Philadelphia Phoenix

=== Week 10 ===
Date	Home	Goals	Goals	Away
6/1	Raleigh Flyers	32	14	Austin Sol
6/2	Detroit Mechanix	18	25	Chicago Wildfire
6/2	Minnesota Wind Chill	22	18	Indianapolis AlleyCats
6/2	Montreal Royal	20	24	Toronto Rush
6/2	Seattle Cascades	25	29	San Jose Spiders
6/2	Pittsburgh Thunderbirds	11	20	DC Breeze
6/2	San Diego Growlers	24	25	San Francisco FlameThrowers
6/2	New York Empire	24	21	Ottawa Outlaws
6/2	Nashville NightWatch	21	31	Dallas Roughnecks
6/2	Tampa Bay Cannons	26	27	Austin Sol
6/3	Philadelphia Phoenix	22	21	Ottawa Outlaws
6/3	Atlanta Hustle	28	29	Dallas Roughnecks
6/3	Los Angeles Aviators	23	19	San Francisco FlameThrowers

=== Week 11 ===
Date	Home	Goals	Goals	Away
6/8	Madison Radicals	20	17	Minnesota Wind Chill
6/8	Ottawa Outlaws	26	27	Montreal Royal
6/9	DC Breeze	25	24	Toronto Rush
6/9	Philadelphia Phoenix	30	21	Pittsburgh Thunderbirds
6/9	Nashville NightWatch	21	24	Atlanta Hustle
6/9	Chicago Wildfire	21	22	Madison Radicals
6/9	San Jose Spiders	21	20	San Diego Growlers
6/9	Austin Sol	17	19	Dallas Roughnecks

=== Week 12 ===
Date	Home	Goals	Goals	Away
6/16	Montreal Royal	26	22	New York Empire
6/16	Minnesota Wind Chill	37	18	Detroit Mechanix
6/16	Pittsburgh Thunderbirds	21	25	Madison Radicals
6/16	Los Angeles Aviators	26	17	Seattle Cascades
6/16	Atlanta Hustle	20	24	Dallas Roughnecks
6/16	San Francisco FlameThrowers	21	17	San Jose Spiders
6/16	Toronto Rush	27	17	Ottawa Outlaws
6/16	Raleigh Flyers	27	15	Nashville NightWatch
6/17	Tampa Bay Cannons	25	28	Dallas Roughnecks
6/17	San Diego Growlers	25	27	Seattle Cascades
6/17	Toronto Rush	25	18	New York Empire
6/17	Chicago Wildfire	34	12	Detroit Mechanix
6/17	Indianapolis AlleyCats	21	20	Madison Radicals

=== Week 13 ===
Date	Home	Goals	Goals	Away
6/23	Minnesota Wind Chill	28	29	Pittsburgh Thunderbirds
6/23	Atlanta Hustle	30	20	Raleigh Flyers
6/23	Toronto Rush	28	21	DC Breeze
6/23	Austin Sol	24	23	Nashville NightWatch
6/23	New York Empire	22	23	Montreal Royal
6/23	Seattle Cascades	22	23	San Diego Growlers
6/23	San Jose Spiders	18	27	Los Angeles Aviators
6/23	Indianapolis AlleyCats	40	20	Detroit Mechanix
6/24	Detroit Mechanix	27	31	Chicago Wildfire
6/24	San Francisco FlameThrowers	24	25	Los Angeles Aviators
6/24	Dallas Roughnecks	28	16	Nashville NightWatch
6/24	Philadelphia Phoenix	27	19	Montreal Royal
6/24	Ottawa Outlaws	29	30	DC Breeze

=== Week 14 ===
Date	Home	Goals	Goals	Away
6/30	Detroit Mechanix	19	20	Pittsburgh Thunderbirds
6/30	Minnesota Wind Chill	25	23	Chicago Wildfire
6/30	Madison Radicals	26	17	Indianapolis AlleyCats
6/30	Ottawa Outlaws	23	29	New York Empire
6/30	San Diego Growlers	27	22	San Francisco FlameThrowers
6/30	DC Breeze	25	15	Philadelphia Phoenix
6/30	Tampa Bay Cannons	19	16	Atlanta Hustle
6/30	Raleigh Flyers	33	20	Nashville NightWatch
6/30	Dallas Roughnecks	29	25	Austin Sol
7/1	Montreal Royal	18	26	New York Empire
7/1	Los Angeles Aviators	28	21	San Francisco FlameThrowers
7/1	Seattle Cascades	25	24	San Jose Spiders
7/3	Madison Radicals	35	24	Minnesota Wind Chill

=== Week 15 ===
Date	Home	Goals	Goals	Away
7/7	Chicago Wildfire	18	25	Indianapolis AlleyCats
7/7	Toronto Rush	28	24	Montreal Royal
7/7	Raleigh Flyers	26	25	Atlanta Hustle
7/7	New York Empire	27	23	Philadelphia Phoenix
7/7	Dallas Roughnecks	21	18	Tampa Bay Cannons
7/8	Austin Sol	6	7	Tampa Bay Cannons
7/8	Ottawa Outlaws	13	26	Toronto Rush

=== Week 16 ===
Date	Home	Goals	Goals	Away
7/13	San Jose Spiders	27	24	Seattle Cascades
7/14	Madison Radicals	27	24	Chicago Wildfire
7/14	Pittsburgh Thunderbirds	32	10	Detroit Mechanix
7/14	San Francisco FlameThrowers	20	31	Seattle Cascades
7/14	DC Breeze	29	19	New York Empire
7/14	Tampa Bay Cannons	24	23	Nashville NightWatch
7/14	Indianapolis AlleyCats	26	16	Minnesota Wind Chill
7/14	San Diego Growlers	34	21	Los Angeles Aviators
7/15	Montreal Royal	25	32	Ottawa Outlaws
7/15	Chicago Wildfire	20	23	Minnesota Wind Chill
7/15	Philadelphia Phoenix	22	30	New York Empire
7/15	Atlanta Hustle	30	26	Nashville NightWatch

== Standings ==
=== East Division ===
Team	W	L	T	Qualifying position
Toronto Rush	13	1	0	East Division Final
DC Breeze	8	5	1	East Division Playoff
New York Empire	8	6	0	East Division Playoff
Philadelphia Phoenix	5	8	1	
Montreal Royal	5	9	0	
Ottawa Outlaws	3	11	0	

=== Midwest Division ===
Team	W	L	Qualifying position
Madison Radicals	12	2	Midwest Division Final
Indianapolis AlleyCats	11	3	Midwest Division Playoff
Minnesota Wind Chill	8	6	Midwest Division Playoff
Chicago Wildfire	5	9	
Pittsburgh Thunderbirds	4	10	
Detroit Mechanix	0	14	

=== South Division ===
Team	W	L	Qualifying position
Dallas Roughnecks	13	1	South Division Final
Raleigh Flyers	10	4	South Division Playoff
Austin Sol	7	7	South Division Playoff
Atlanta Hustle	7	7	
Tampa Bay Cannons	4	10	
Nashville NightWatch	3	11	

=== West Division ===
Team	W	L	Qualifying position
Los Angeles Aviators	11	3	West Division Final
San Diego Growlers	7	7	West Division Final
San Jose Spiders	6	8	
San Francisco FlameThrowers	5	9	
Seattle Cascades	5	9	

== Postseason ==
=== Divisional playoff ===
Date	Division	Home	Goals	Goals	Away
7/21	East Division	DC Breeze	15	19	New York Empire
7/21	Midwest Division	Indianapolis AlleyCats	20	19	Minnesota Wind Chill
7/27	South Division	Raleigh Flyers	26	23	Austin Sol

=== Divisional final ===
Date	Division	Home	Goals	Goals	Away
7/21	West Division	Los Angeles Aviators	26	22	San Diego Growlers
7/28	Midwest Division	Madison Radicals	27	18	Indianapolis AlleyCats
7/28	East Division	Toronto Rush	17	18	New York Empire
7/28	South Division	Dallas Roughnecks	20	19	Raleigh Flyers

=== Championship Weekend VII ===
Championship Weekend VII was held in Madison, Wisconsin at Breese Stevens Field from August 11-12, 2018.

Date	Match	Seed	Team	Goals	Goals	Team	Seed
8/11	Semifinal	1	Dallas Roughnecks	32	30	New York Empire	4
8/11	Semifinal	2	Madison Radicals	24	19	Los Angeles Aviators	3
8/12	Final	1	Dallas Roughnecks	16	20	Madison Radicals	2

The Madison Radicals won their first championship, and did so in front of a home crowd.
