= Minnesota Wind Chill =

Ultimate frisbee team based in Saint Paul, Minnesota

- Sport: Ultimate frisbee
- Founded: 2013
- League: Ultimate Frisbee Association
- Division: Central
- Team history: Minnesota Wind Chill (2013–Present)
- Based in: Saint Paul, Minnesota
- Stadium: Sea Foam Stadium
- Colors: Metallic Blue, Black and White
- Owner: Omar Ansari, Ben Feldman, Steve Sabes
- Head coach: Ben Feldman
- Championships: 1 (2024)
- Division titles: 3 (2023, 2024, 2025)
- Playoff berths: 8 (2016, 2017, 2019, 2021, 2022, 2023, 2024, 2025)
- Website: www.windchillultimate.com

The Minnesota Wind Chill are a professional ultimate team based in Saint Paul, Minnesota. The Wind Chill compete in the Ultimate Frisbee Association (UFA) as a member of the Central Division. They are one of two teams in the UFA to represent a state rather than a specific city. The team won their first UFA Championship in 2024, beating the Carolina Flyers 17-16.

== Roster ==
=== 2026 ===
Current Wind Chill Players for the 2026 Season:

No.	Player	Position
0	Bret Bergmeier	Defender
1	William Brandt	Handler
2	Lukas Ambrose	Defender
3	Bryan Vohnoutka*	Cutter
4	Noah Hanson	Defender
5	Justin Burnett	Defender
6	Kristian Johnson	Handler
7	Eric Crosby Lehmann	
8	Zach Morton	
9	Sebastian Brauer	Handler
10	Jordan Taylor	Cutter
13	Peter Mans	Cutter
15	Kyle Suelflow	Defender
18	Gordon Larson	Handler
22	Danny Hobday	
23	Paul Krenik	Defender
24	Thomas Shope	Cutter
28	Cameron Lacy	Defender
29	Josh Klane	Handler
30	Leo Sovell-Fernandez	Handler
31	Nathan De Morgan	Handler
32	Greg Cousins	Cutter
44	Ethan Ode	
47	Mickey Walsh	Cutter
51	Blake Krapfl	Cutter
54	Dylan Declerck	Cutter
59	Noah Coolman	Cutter
61	Brandon Matis	Cutter
77	Owen Suelflow	
88	Micah Davis	
95	Ellis Newhouse	
96	Max Hanscom	Cutter
99	Tristan Van de Moortele	Handler

*Denotes captains

=== Coaching staff ===
Ben Feldman – Coach
Max Longchamp – Assistant Coach
Carlos Lopez – Player Development Coach
Kelsey Percy – Team Advisor and Community Liaison

=== Management ===
Omar Ansari – Owner
Ben Feldman – Owner/General Manager
Steve Sabes – Owner
Tyler Anderson – Assistant General Manager

== Results ==
=== 2024 ===
Date	Opponent	Result
4/27	@ Pittsburgh Thunderbirds	18–11
5/11	@ Chicago Union	16–14
5/18	vs Pittsburgh Thunderbirds	15–16
5/24	@ Madison Radicals	21–17
6/8	@ Indianapolis AlleyCats	24–21
6/15	vs Colorado Summit	20–17
6/22	vs Madison Radicals	22–17
6/28	@ Chicago Union	17–16
6/29	@ Detroit Mechanix	31–15
7/6	vs Chicago Union	20–25
7/12	@ New York Empire	16–25
7/20	vs Detroit Mechanix	30–16
8/10	vs Madison Radicals	23-14
8/23	@ DC Breeze	16–13
8/24	@ Carolina Flyers	17-16

=== 2017 ===
Date	Opponent	Result
4/22	vs Indianapolis AlleyCats	26–16
4/29	vs Madison Radicals	22–20
5/6	vs Indianapolis AlleyCats	28–25
5/13	@ Chicago Wildfire	20–17
5/14	@ Detroit Mechanix	22–19
5/20	vs Detroit Mechanix	26–17
5/28	vs Chicago Wildfire	23–20
6/10	vs Madison Radicals	22–23 (OT)
6/17	@ Chicago Wildfire	23–12
7/1	@ Madison Radicals	13–22
7/8	@ Detroit Mechanix	31–17
7/9	@ Pittsburgh Thunderbirds	22–26
7/14	@ Indianapolis AlleyCats	26–25 (OT)
7/22	@ Pittsburgh Thunderbirds	19–13
8/4	Pittsburgh Thunderbirds	25–26

=== 2016 ===
Date	Opponent	Result
4/9	@ Madison Radicals	11–25
4/10	@ Chicago Wildfire	17–11
4/16	vs Chicago Wildfire	22–21
4/30	@ Indianapolis AlleyCats	21–20
5/1	@ Cincinnati Revolution	32–26
5/7	vs Indianapolis AlleyCats	24–23
5/14	vs Chicago Wildfire	26–23
5/22	vs Pittsburgh Thunderbirds	24–27
5/27	@ Madison Radicals	15–36
6/10	vs Detroit Mechanix	31–28
6/17	vs Madison Radicals	16–25
7/2	vs Cincinnati Revolution	28–21
7/9	@ Pittsburgh Thunderbirds	21–29
7/10	@ Detroit Mechanix	20–19
7/16	@ Pittsburgh Thunderbirds	18–20

=== 2015 ===
Date	Opponent	Result
4/25	Chicago Wildfire	14–20
5/3	Pittsburgh Thunderbirds	17–30
5/9	Pittsburgh Thunderbirds	22–28
5/10	Detroit Mechanix	27–20
5/16	Chicago Wildfire	15–25
5/22	Madison Radicals	18–23
5/23	Chicago Wildfire	15–25
5/30	Madison Radicals	18–23
6/6	Cincinnati Revolution	25–17
6/12	Madison Radicals	19–31
6/27	Cincinnati Revolution	21–17
6/28	Indianapolis AlleyCats	25–21
7/11	Indianapolis AlleyCats	22–21
7/17	Detroit Mechanix	45–11

=== Team history ===
Year	Record	GF	GA	Regular Season	Postseason
2013	4–12	336	355	4th, Midwestern Division	Did not qualify
2014	8–6	341	302	4th, Midwestern Division	Did not qualify
2015	6–8	290	302	5th, Midwest Division	Did not qualify
2016	9–6	326	354	3rd, Midwest Division	Loss, first round (Pittsburgh Thunderbirds)
2017	11–4	348	297	2nd, Midwest Division	Loss, first round (Pittsburgh Thunderbirds)
2018	8–6	363	323	3rd, Midwest Division	Loss, first round (Indianapolis AlleyCats)
2019	6–6	261	252	4th, Midwest Division	Did not qualify
2020	N/A	N/A	N/A		
2021	10–2	280	231	2nd, Central Division	Loss, first round (Chicago Union)
2022	9–3	283	211	2nd, Central Division	Loss, division final (Chicago Union)
2023	11–3	283	241	1st, Central Division	Loss, semi-final (Salt Lake Shred)
2024	11–3	289	237	1st, Central Division	Champions
2025	9–3	256	193	2nd, Central Division	Loss, final (Boston Glory)
