= Carolina Flyers =

Professional ultimate team based in Raleigh-Durham, North Carolina

- Sport: Ultimate frisbee
- Founded: 2015
- League: Ultimate Frisbee Association
- Division: South
- Based in: Durham, North Carolina
- Stadium: Durham County Stadium
- Owners: Mike Denardis
- Head coach: Mike Denardis
- Championships: 1 (2021)
- Website: watchufa.com/flyers/

The Carolina Flyers (formerly the Raleigh Flyers) are a professional ultimate team based in Durham, North Carolina. The Flyers compete in the Ultimate Frisbee Association (UFA) as a member of the South Division. The team was founded in 2015. From 2015 through 2018, the Flyers played most of their home games at Crusader Stadium on the campus of Cardinal Gibbons High School in Raleigh, with some home games at WakeMed Soccer Park in Cary. In 2019, the team has played home games at WakeMed Soccer Park, and other venues. After the 2020 AUDL season was cancelled due to the COVID-19 pandemic, the team moved their home games to Durham County Stadium beginning in 2021. In 2022, the team announced that it was changing its name to the Carolina Flyers. The team had won the national title once in 2021.

== History ==
=== 2015 ===
The Flyers won the South Division in their inaugural season, with a record of 11–3. In the divisional playoffs, they beat the Jacksonville Cannons 28–27 in double overtime to advance, where they were defeated 22–19 in the national semifinals by the Madison Radicals. The Flyers signed the first-ever female professional ultimate player, Jessi Jones, to play in their game against the Nashville Nightwatch in May 2015. Jones, who was a team USA U-23 player in 2013, was signed as part of "Women's Ultimate Day".

=== 2016 ===
In 2016, the Flyers finished 9–5, which secured a #2 spot in the AUDL South Division, but were upset in the first round by the visiting #3 seed Atlanta Hustle, 23–25.

=== 2017 ===
With the folding of the Charlotte Express after the 2016 season, the Flyers signed eleven of Charlotte's former players (Matt Bode, Clint McSherry, Jesse Lieberman, Micah Hood, Jeff Nordgren, Taylor Minch, Nate Goff, Shane Sisco, Evan Howey, Jacob Fairfax, Charlie Muniz) as well as AUDL veterans Jonathan "Goose" Helton (Indianapolis AlleyCats, Chicago Wildfire, DC Breeze), Brett Matzuka (Chicago Wildfire, DC Breeze), and Mike Pannone (Rochester Dragons, Pittsburgh Riverhounds) for the 2017 season. The Flyers won the AUDL's first ever regular season cross-divisional match against the DC Breeze 23–21 in overtime on April 22, 2017, as part of the league's "Cross Coast Challenge". The Raleigh Flyers won the South Division with a 13–1 regular season record, but fell to the Dallas Roughnecks in the first round of the divisional playoffs.

The AUDL voted unanimously to recognize Jonathan Nethercutt as the League's Most Valuable Player for 2017.

=== 2018 ===
With the addition of Jakeem Polk, Andrew McKelvey, and Mischa Freystaetter, all previously of the Jacksonville Cannons to their roster, Raleigh was considered a strong pre-season contender. In addition to 12 divisional games, Raleigh played 2 cross-divisional games against the DC Breeze and Madison Radicals. In the game against Madison, Raleigh gave Madison only its 2nd ever loss at home and Madison's largest margin of defeat ever (8 points). Raleigh was the only team to defeat Madison during their run to the 2018 AUDL Championship. Raleigh finished the regular season as the #2 seed in the South Division with 10 wins and 4 losses. After defeating the Austin Sol in the divisional play-off game 26–23, they lost to the Dallas Roughnecks 19–20 in the divisional championship game after being up 6 goals just after halftime.

=== 2019 ===
Raleigh finished the season at 10–2 and won the South Division with their only 2 regular season losses coming against the Dallas Roughnecks and New York Empire, the two teams that would subsequently play for the AUDL Championship. Raleigh sent Jacob Fairfax and Henry Fisher to the inaugural AUDL All-Star weekend in Madison, Wisconsin. Raleigh was eliminated from the playoffs by the Dallas Roughnecks by a score of 19–17.

=== 2020 ===
The 2020 AUDL Season was cancelled due to the COVID-19 pandemic

=== 2021 ===
Due to ongoing travel restrictions due to the COVID-19 pandemic, the Canadian teams in the AUDL were grouped into a single division to compete for the AUDL Canada Cup and the other AUDL divisions were re-aligned. Raleigh finished the season at 8–4. Raleigh defeated DC Breeze 19–16 to earn a trip to AUDL Championship weekend, where they defeated the Chicago Union 21–20 in OT in the National semifinal and the New York Empire 19–16 to win their first AUDL Championship.

=== 2022 ===
The Flyers completed their 2022 season as regular season champions of the AUDL South Division with an 11–1 record. They defeated the Austin Sol in the Divisional Championship to go to AUDL Championship weekend, where they lost the national semifinal to the New York Empire.

=== 2023 ===
The Flyers completed wither 2023 season with an 7–5 record, which was sufficient for a #3 seed to the divisional playoffs, but they lost the divisional semifinal against the Austin Sol.

== Season by season ==
Year	Regular Season	Playoffs
2015	11–3	1–1 (National semifinalist)
2016	9–5	0–1 (Division semifinalist)
2017	13–1	0–1 (Division finalist)
2018	10–4	1–1 (Division finalist)
2019	10–2	0–1 (Division finalist)
2020	Cancelled due to COVID-19 pandemic	
2021	8–4	2–0 (National Champion)
2022	11–1	1-1 (National semifinalist)
2023	7-4	0-1 (Division semifinalist)

== All-time record by opponent ==
This table reflects games through the end of the 2023 season.

Opponent	Regular Season	Playoffs
Atlanta Hustle	13–8	0–1
Austin Sol	9–3	2–1
Boston Glory	2–0	
Charlotte Express (defunct)	7–0	
Chicago Union		0–1
Dallas Legion	8–5	0–3
DC Breeze	3–5	1–0
Houston Havoc	1–0	
Madison Radicals	1–0	0–1
Nashville Nightwatch (defunct)	12–0	
New York Empire	0–2	1-1
Philadelphia Phoenix	1–1	
Pittsburgh Thunderbirds	3–0	
Jacksonville/Tampa Bay Cannons (defunct)	20–2	1–0
