= Houston Havoc =

American pro ultimate frisbee team

- Sport: Ultimate frisbee
- Founded: 2022
- League: Ultimate Frisbee Association
- Division: South
- Location: Houston, Texas
- Stadium: SaberCats Stadium
- Colors: Yellow, Teal, and White
- Head coach: Sean McCall
- Website: watchufa.com/havoc

The Houston Havoc are a professional ultimate team based in Houston, Texas. The Havoc have competed in the Ultimate Frisbee Association (UFA) as a member of the South Division since 2023.

== History ==
On November 18, 2022, the UFA announced that an expansion team based in Houston was slated to join the league in 2023, sharing a stadium with the Houston SaberCats of Major League Rugby.

The Havoc's founding came after the departure of two UFA teams, the Tampa Bay Cannons and the Ottawa Outlaws. This left the UFA with 23 teams in place, and although the league had originally planned the debut of the Houston team for 2024, it was decided to bring the timeline forward to compensate.

The Havoc named their first head coach, Bex Forth, in December of 2022 and played their inaugural game against the Austin Sol on April 29, 2023.

=== 2023 ===
For the 2023 season, the Havoc had a record of 2-10 and finished 4th in the South Division.

=== 2026 ===
Bex Forth announced on Facebook that she would not be returning as the Havoc coach following the 2025 season. Sean McCall was appointed for the 2026 season.

== Seasons ==
Key
Ultimate Frisbee champions*	Semifinalist#	Division champions†	First Round^

Houston Havoc seasonal records
Season	Team	League	Division	Regular season				Postseason results	Awards^{[Key]}	Head coach
Season	Team	League	Division	Finish	W	L	T	Postseason results	Awards^{[Key]}	Head coach
2023	2023	UFA	South	4th	2	10	0	DNQ		Bex Forth
2024	2024	UFA	South	4th	5	7	0	DNQ		Bex Forth
2025	2025	UFA	South	6th	2	10	0	DNQ		Bex Forth
2026	2026	UFA	South	5th	2	10	0	DNQ		Bex Forth
