= DC Breeze =

Ultimate frisbee team based in Washington, D.C.

- Sport: Ultimate
- Founded: 2013
- League: Ultimate Frisbee Association
- Division: East
- Based in: Washington, D.C.
- Stadium: Carlini Field
- Colors: Red, blue, silver
- Owners: Ty Simpson, Aaron Foreman
- Head coach: Xavier Maxstadt
- General manager: Sean Banks
- Overall record: 110–59–1
- Playoff berths: 11 (6–11)
- Mascot: Megatron
- Broadcasters: Tyler Byrum & Will Smolinski
- Website: thedcbreeze.com

The DC Breeze are a professional ultimate team based in Washington, D.C. The Breeze compete in the Ultimate Frisbee Association (UFA) as a member of the East Division. The team first played in the 2013 season. The Breeze play at Carlini Field (Catholic University).

== History ==
=== Early years (2013-2016) ===
The DC Breeze were founded in 2013, posting a 4-12 record for fifth place in the East division.

In their second year, the DC Breeze found more success, with coach Alex "Dutchy" Ghesquiere and University of Pittsburgh rookies Alex Thorne and Tyler DeGirolamo leading the team to a 10-4 record and coming within one goal of defeating defending league champions Toronto Rush.

In 2015, League expansion to Pittsburgh and Raleigh took regional talent away from the Breeze, and the team went 7–7 in the regular season, failing to qualify for the playoffs as they had the year before.

In 2016, the Breeze went 10–4 in the regular season for a second-place finish and earned their first home playoff game. The Breeze won their first playoff victory in that game, defeating the New York Empire, but lost the East Division final to the Toronto Rush.

=== Darryl Stanley era (2017-2023) ===
In 2017, the Breeze hired Darryl Stanley as head coach while Ghesquiere moved into an oversight role as Technical Director. The team again went 10–4 and finished in second place, and once again won a home playoff game, this time against the Montréal Royal. For the second consecutive season, the Breeze lost to Toronto in the Division Final.

In 2018, Matthew "Rowan" McDonnell joined the Breeze, serving as team captain while collecting 38 goals, 47 assists and 11 blocks. The Breeze finished the season with a 8–5–1 record, a second-place finish in the AUDL East, and the team's fourth playoff appearance in the last five years. Meanwhile, McDonnell won the league's 2018 AUDL MVP Award.

The 2019 season ended similarly for the Breeze, with a 7-5 record, elimination in the first round of playoffs, and McDonnell as an MVP finalist.. The 2019 Breeze roster also produced two All-AUDL Rookie 2nd Team members in AJ Merriman and Garrett Braun.

The 2020 season was canceled due to the COVID-19 pandemic.

After being added to the new Atlantic Division in 2021, the Breeze posted a 10-2 regular season record, with breakout performances from O-line handler Johnny Malks and D-Line cutter AJ Merriman, who earned Defensive Player of the Year honors.

For the 2022 season, the Breeze added former players Tyler Monroe, Christian Boxley, David Cranston, Troy Holland, Alan Kolick, and Delrico Johnson to the roster, while Merriman, Malks, and McDonnell returned. The Breeze posted a 10-2 regular season record, losing both games to the New York Empire, the eventual league champions.

In 2023, the Breeze went 9-3 and were eliminated in the East Division finals by eventual champions New York Empire. It would be Darryl Stanley's last game coaching the Breeze.

=== Boyle-Maxstadt era (2024-present) ===
In 2024, Lauren Boyle was hired as head coach of the Breeze, while the league (formerly known as the American Ultimate Disc League (AUDL)) also announced a rebrand to the Ultimate Frisbee Association (UFA). Notable roster departures from the 2023 Breeze campaign included Christian Boxley, David Cranston, Moussa Dia, Alexandre Fall, Jeremy Knopf, Joe Merrill and Benjamin Oort. The Breeze finished the 2024 season at 10-2, defeating the New York Empire for the first time since 2021 and claiming the franchise's first-ever East Division title. The Breeze faced the Minnesota Wind Chill in the UFA Semifinal under very windy conditions, who handed the Breeze their fourth-straight playoff loss to the eventual league champion.

In 2025, the Breeze went 7-5, feeling the loss of Malks acutely.

Boyle departed as head coach prior to the 2026 season and was replaced by Xavier Maxstadt, who had previously been an assistant coach and a player. Despite losing key players such as McDonnell and Thomas Edmonds, the Breeze ended the season with a 9-4 record.

== Year-by-year ==
| Year | Reg. season | Goals For | Goals Against | Finish | Playoffs |
|---|---|---|---|---|---|
| 2013 | 4–12 | 293 | 378 | 5th East | Failed to Qualify |
| 2014 | 10–4 | 347 | 344 | 3rd East | Lost Division Semifinal |
| 2015 | 7–7 | 302 | 316 | 5th East | Failed to Qualify |
| 2016 | 10–4 | 396 | 329 | 2nd East | Lost Division Final |
| 2017 | 10–4 | 392 | 338 | 2nd East | Lost Division Final |
| 2018 | 8–5–1 | 343 | 324 | 2nd East | Lost Division Semifinal |
| 2019 | 7–5 | 281 | 262 | 3rd East | Lost Division Semifinal |
| 2020 (cancelled) | N/A | N/A | N/A | N/A | N/A |
| 2021 | 10–2 | 284 | 218 | 1st Atlantic | Lost 1st Round |
| 2022 | 10–2 | 328 | 277 | 2nd East | Lost Division Final |
| 2023 | 9–3 | 290 | 241 | 2nd East | Lost Division Final |
| 2024 | 10–2 | 281 | 231 | 1st East | Lost UFA Semifinal |
| 2025 | 7–5 | 254 | 241 | 2nd East | Lost Division Final |
| 2026 | 9-3 | 284 | 261 | 3rd East | Lost Division Semifinal |
| Total | 110–59–1 (65%) | 4075 | 3760 | | 6–11 (35%) |

== Full schedule ==
2013
| Date | Home team | Away team | Final Score | Standing |
|---|---|---|---|---|
| Sat 4/20 | DC Breeze | Toronto Rush | 13–30 | 0–1 |
| Sun 4/28 | DC Breeze | Rochester Dragons | 26–25 | 1–1 |
| Sat 5/04 | New York Empire | DC Breeze | 25–11 | 1–2 |
| Sun 5/05 | Philadelphia Phoenix | DC Breeze | 23–18 | 1–3 |
| Sun 5/12 | DC Breeze | New Jersey Hammerheads | 18–13 | 2–3 |
| Sat 5/18 | DC Breeze | Philadelphia Phoenix | 17–18 | 2–4 |
| Sat 5/25 | DC Breeze | Rochester Dragons | 14–16 | 2–5 |
| Sat 6/01 | New Jersey Hammerheads | DC Breeze | 20–22 | 3–5 |
| Sun 6/02 | New York Empire | DC Breeze | 23–13 | 3–6 |
| Sat 6/08 | Philadelphia Phoenix | DC Breeze | 31–27 | 3–7 |
| Sat 6/16 | DC Breeze | New York Empire | 16–19 | 3–8 |
| Sat 6/22 | Toronto Rush | DC Breeze | 40–16 | 3–9 |
| Sun 6/23 | Rochester Dragons | DC Breeze | 24–20 | 3–10 |
| Sat 6/29 | DC Breeze | Philadelphia Phoenix | 21–23 | 3–11 |
| Sat 7/06 | New Jersey Hammerheads | DC Breeze | 17–24 | 4–11 |
| Sat 7/13 | DC Breeze | Toronto Rush | 17–31 | 4–12 |

2014
| Date | Home team | Away team | Final Score | Standing |
|---|---|---|---|---|
| Sat 4/12 | DC Breeze | Toronto Rush | 19–20 | 0–1 |
| Sun 4/27 | DC Breeze | Rochester Dragons | 30–22 | 1–1 |
| Sat 5/03 | Philadelphia Phoenix | DC Breeze | 22–30 | 2–1 |
| Sun 5/04 | DC Breeze | Philadelphia Phoenix | 28–19 | 3–1 |
| Sun 5/18 | DC Breeze | Philadelphia Phoenix | 25–21 | 4–1 |
| Sat 5/24 | Toronto Rush | DC Breeze | 27–17 | 4–2 |
| Sun 5/25 | Rochester Dragons | DC Breeze | 21–26 | 5–2 |
| Sun 6/08 | DC Breeze | Montréal Royal | 25–24 | 6–2 |
| Sat 6/14 | DC Breeze | New York Empire | 31–26 | 7–2 |
| Sat 6/28 | Montréal Royal | DC Breeze | 20–29 | 8–2 |
| Sun 6/29 | New York Empire | DC Breeze | 21–13 | 8–3 |
| Sat 7/05 | DC Breeze | New York Empire | 23–31 | 8–4 |
| Sun 7/06 | Philadelphia Phoenix | DC Breeze | 20–25 | 9–4 |
| Sat 7/12 | New York Empire | DC Breeze | 13–14 | 10–4 |
| Sat 7/19 | Toronto Rush | DC Breeze | 37–12 | Playoffs – 0–1 |

2015
| Date | Home team | Away team | Final Score | Standing |
|---|---|---|---|---|
| Sat 4/11 | DC Breeze | Toronto Rush | 17–37 | 0–1 |
| Sat 4/18 | DC Breeze | Ottawa Outlaws | 23–19 | 1–1 |
| Sun 5/03 | DC Breeze | Montréal Royal | 20–21 | 1–2 |
| Sat 5/09 | Philadelphia Phoenix | DC Breeze | 29–30 (OT) | 2–2 |
| Sat 5/16 | DC Breeze | New York Empire | 18–22 | 2–3 |
| Sat 5/23 | Toronto Rush | DC Breeze | 33–21 | 2–4 |
| Sun 5/24 | Rochester Dragons | DC Breeze | 25–26 | 3–4 |
| Sat 6/06 | Philadelphia Phoenix | DC Breeze | 20–26 | 4–4 |
| Sat 6/20 | DC Breeze | New York Empire | 7–8 | 4–5 |
| Sun 6/21 | New York Empire | DC Breeze | 21–13 | 4–6 |
| Sat 7/04 | Ottawa Outlaws | DC Breeze | 25–26 | 5–6 |
| Sun 7/05 | Montréal Royal | DC Breeze | 25–21 | 5–7 |
| Fri 7/10 | DC Breeze | Philadelphia Phoenix | 27–12 | 6–7 |
| Sat 7/11 | DC Breeze | Rochester Dragons | 27–19 | 7–7 |

2016
| Date | Home team | Away team | Final Score | Standing |
|---|---|---|---|---|
| Sun 4/10 | DC Breeze | Ottawa Outlaws | 28–17 | 1–0 |
| Sat 4/23 | DC Breeze | Toronto Rush | 24–25 (2OT) | 1–1 |
| Sat 4/30 | Toronto Rush | DC Breeze | 24–23 | 1–2 |
| Sun 5/01 | Montréal Royal | DC Breeze | 18–26 | 2–2 |
| Sat 5/07 | DC Breeze | New York Empire | 23–22 (2OT) | 3–2 |
| Sat 5/14 | Philadelphia Phoenix | DC Breeze | 15–24 | 4–2 |
| Sat 5/21 | New York Empire | DC Breeze | 14–15 | 5–2 |
| Sun 5/22 | DC Breeze | Montréal Royal | 28–14 | 6–2 |
| Sat 5/28 | Montréal Royal | DC Breeze | 27–22 | 6–3 |
| Sun 5/29 | Ottawa Outlaws | DC Breeze | 27–22 | 6–4 |
| Sat 6/04 | DC Breeze | Toronto Rush | 28–23 | 7–4 |
| Sat 6/11 | DC Breeze | New York Empire | 27–26 (2OT) | 8–4 |
| Sat 6/18 | Philadelphia Phoenix | DC Breeze | 18–34 | 9–4 |
| Sat 6/25 | DC Breeze | Philadelphia Phoenix | 27–16 | 10–4 |
| Sat 7/16 | DC Breeze | New York Empire | 24–20 | Playoffs – 1–0 |
| Sat 7/23 | Toronto Rush | DC Breeze | 21–23 (OT) | Playoffs – 1–1 |

2017
| Date | Home team | Away team | Final Score | Standing |
|---|---|---|---|---|
| Sun 4/09 | DC Breeze | Toronto Rush | 32–21 | 1–0 |
| Sat 4/22 | Raleigh Flyers | DC Breeze | 23–21 (OT) | 1–1 |
| Sat 4/29 | DC Breeze | Ottawa Outlaws | 29–24 | 2–1 |
| Sat 5/06 | DC Breeze | New York Empire | 22–21 | 3–1 |
| Sat 5/13 | Toronto Rush | DC Breeze | 26–20 | 3–2 |
| Sat 5/20 | DC Breeze | Montréal Royal | 23–20 | 4–2 |
| Sat 5/27 | New York Empire | DC Breeze | 25–28 | 5–2 |
| Sat 6/03 | Philadelphia Phoenix | DC Breeze | 22–21 | 5–3 |
| Sun 6/04 | DC Breeze | New York Empire | 18–17 (2OT) | 6–3 |
| Sun 6/11 | DC Breeze | Toronto Rush | 25–17 | 7–3 |
| Sat 6/17 | Montréal Royal | DC Breeze | 27–23 | 7–4 |
| Sun 6/18 | Ottawa Outlaws | DC Breeze | 13–28 | 8–4 |
| Sat 6/24 | DC Breeze | Philadelphia Phoenix | 25–17 | 9–4 |
| Sat 7/22 | Philadelphia Phoenix | DC Breeze | 20–23 | 10–4 |
| Fri 8/11 | DC Breeze | Montréal Royal | 28 -16 | Playoffs – 1–0 |
| Sun 8/13 | Toronto Rush | DC Breeze | 29–26 | Playoffs – 1–1 |

2018
| Date | Home team | Away team | Final Score | Standing |
|---|---|---|---|---|
| Sat 4/7 | DC Breeze | Montréal Royal | 22–24 | 0–1 |
| Sun 4/22 | DC Breeze | Ottawa Outlaws | 26–19 | 1–1 |
| Sat 4/28 | Philadelphia Phoenix | DC Breeze | 18–18 | 1–1–1 |
| Sat 5/5 | DC Breeze | New York Empire | 18–19 | 1–2–1 |
| Sat 5/12 | DC Breeze | Raleigh Flyers | 25–24 | 2–2–1 |
| Sat 5/19 | Toronto Rush | DC Breeze | 20–33 | 3–2–1 |
| Sun 5/20 | Montréal Royal | DC Breeze | 20–21 | 4–2–1 |
| Sat 5/26 | New York Empire | DC Breeze | 29–21 | 4–3–1 |
| Sat 6/02 | Pittsburgh Thunderbirds | DC Breeze | 20–11 | 4–4–1 |
| Sat 6/09 | DC Breeze | Toronto Rush | 25–24 | 5–4–1 |
| Sat 6/23 | Toronto Rush | DC Breeze | 21–28 | 6–4–1 |
| Sun 6/24 | Ottawa Outlaws | DC Breeze | 30–29 | 6–5–1 |
| Sat 6/30 | DC Breeze | Philadelphia Phoenix | 25–15 | 7–5–1 |
| Sat 7/14 | DC Breeze | New York Empire | 29–19 | 8–5–1 |
| Sat 7/21 | New York Empire | DC Breeze | 19–15 | Playoffs – 0–1 |

2019
| Date | Home team | Away team | Final Score | Standing |
|---|---|---|---|---|
| Sat 4/13 | New York Empire | DC Breeze | 21–18 | 0–1 |
| Sat 4/20 | DC Breeze | Philadelphia Phoenix | 20–18 | 1–1 |
| Sat 5/4 | DC Breeze | Ottawa Outlaws | 24–15 | 2–1 |
| Sat 5/11 | New York Empire | DC Breeze | 26–25 | 2–2 |
| Sat 5/18 | Ottawa Outlaws | DC Breeze | 22–21 | 2–3 |
| Sun 5/19 | Montréal Royal | DC Breeze | 19–20 | 3–3 |
| Sun 5/26 | DC Breeze | Montréal Royal | 27–17 | 4–3 |
| Sat 6/1 | DC Breeze | New York Empire | 19–20 | 4–4 |
| Sat 6/15 | DC Breeze | Toronto Rush | 23–22 | 5–4 |
| Sun 6/16 | Philadelphia Phoenix | DC Breeze | 16–21 | 6–4 |
| Sat 6/22 | DC Breeze | Philadelphia Phoenix | 21–18 | 7–4 |
| Sat 7/6 | Toronto Rush | DC Breeze | 26–21 | 7–5 |
| Sat 7/20 | Toronto Rush | DC Breeze | 22–21 | Playoffs – 0–1 |

2020 (Cancelled)
| Date | Home team | Away team | Final Score | Standing |
|---|---|---|---|---|
| Sat 4/4 | Raleigh Flyers | DC Breeze | N/A | N/A |
| Sat 4/11 | DC Breeze | Philadelphia Phoenix | N/A | N/A |
| Sat 4/18 | Pittsburgh Thunderbirds | DC Breeze | N/A | N/A |
| Sat 4/25 | DC Breeze | Raleigh Flyers | N/A | N/A |
| Sat 5/2 | Philadelphia Phoenix | DC Breeze | N/A | N/A |
| Sat 5/9 | Atlanta Hustle | DC Breeze | N/A | N/A |
| Sat 5/16 | DC Breeze | Tampa Bay Cannons | N/A | N/A |
| Sat 5/30 | New York Empire | DC Breeze | N/A | N/A |
| Sun 5/31 | DC Breeze | Pittsburgh Thunderbirds | N/A | N/A |
| Sat 6/6 | Tampa Bay Cannons | DC Breeze | N/A | N/A |
| Sat 6/20 | DC Breeze | Raleigh Flyers | N/A | N/A |
| Sat 7/18 | DC Breeze | Atlanta Hustle | N/A | N/A |

2021
| Date | Home team | Away team | Final Score | Standing |
|---|---|---|---|---|
| Fri 6/4 | New York Empire | DC Breeze | 19–18 | 0–1 |
| Sat 6/5 | DC Breeze | Tampa Bay Cannons | 24–10 | 1–1 |
| Sat 6/12 | Raleigh Flyers | DC Breeze | 24–25 | 2–1 |
| Fri 6/18 | DC Breeze | Boston Glory | 32–20 | 3–1 |
| Fri 7/2 | DC Breeze | New York Empire | 20–17 | 4–1 |
| Sat 7/10 | Atlanta Hustle | DC Breeze | 14–19 | 5–1 |
| Sat 7/17 | DC Breeze | Atlanta Hustle | 13–17 | 5–2 |
| Sat 7/31 | DC Breeze | Philadelphia Phoenix | 22–12 | 6–2 |
| Fri 8/6 | Philadelphia Phoenix | DC Breeze | 13–20 | 7–2 |
| Sun 8/8 | Pittsburgh Thunderbirds | DC Breeze | 16–25 | 8–2 |
| Sat 8/21 | DC Breeze | Raleigh Flyers | 22–21 (2OT) | 9–2 |
| Sun 8/29 | Tampa Bay Cannons | DC Breeze | 16–28 | 10–2 |
| Fri 9/3 | DC Breeze | Raleigh Flyers | 16–19 | Playoffs – 0–1 |

2022
| Date | Home team | Away team | Final Score | Standing |
|---|---|---|---|---|
| Sat 4/30 | DC Breeze | New York Empire | 19–22 | 0–1 |
| Sat 5/14 | DC Breeze | Montreal Royal | 27–17 | 1–1 |
| Sat 5/28 | Toronto Rush | DC Breeze | 26–27 | 2–1 |
| Fri 6/3 | DC Breeze | Boston Glory | 25–20 | 3–1 |
| Fri 6/10 | New York Empire | DC Breeze | 25–21 | 3–2 |
| Sat 6/18 | DC Breeze | Toronto Rush | 26–16 | 4–2 |
| Sat 7/2 | Philadelphia Phoenix | DC Breeze | 21–22 | 5–2 |
| Fri 7/8 | DC Breeze | Philadelphia Phoenix | 25–24 | 6–2 |
| Fri 7/15 | Montreal Royal | DC Breeze | 14–24 | 7–2 |
| Sat 7/16 | Ottawa Outlaws | DC Breeze | 17–24 | 8–2 |
| Sat 7/23 | Boston Glory | DC Breeze | 21–23 (OT) | 9–2 |
| Fri 7/29 | DC Breeze | Ottawa Outlaws | 24–17 | 10–2 |
| Sat 8/13 | DC Breeze | Philadelphia Phoenix | 23–18 | Playoffs – 1–0 |
| Sat 8/20 | New York Empire | DC Breeze | 19–18 | Playoffs – 1–1 |

2023
| Date | Home team | Away team | Final Score | Standing |
|---|---|---|---|---|
| Sat 4/29 | Carolina Flyers | DC Breeze | 16–21 | 1–0 |
| Sun 5/7 | DC Breeze | Philadelphia Phoenix | 20–19 | 2–0 |
| Sat 5/13 | DC Breeze | New York Empire | 17–18 (OT) | 2–1 |
| Sat 5/20 | Toronto Rush | DC Breeze | 13–20 | 3–1 |
| Fri 6/2 | DC Breeze | Carolina Flyers | 19–20 | 3–2 |
| Fri 6/16 | DC Breeze | Montreal Royal | 23–14 | 4–2 |
| Fri 6/23 | Montreal Royal | DC Breeze | 18–25 | 5–2 |
| Sat 6/24 | Boston Glory | DC Breeze | 16–20 | 6–2 |
| Fri 6/30 | New York Empire | DC Breeze | 21–18 | 6–3 |
| Sat 7/8 | DC Breeze | Boston Glory | 22–15 | 7–3 |
| Sat 7/15 | Philadelphia Phoenix | DC Breeze | 18–20 (OT) | 8–3 |
| Fri 7/21 | DC Breeze | Toronto Rush | 27–17 | 9–3 |
| Sat 7/29 | DC Breeze | Boston Glory | 19–12 | Playoffs – 1–0 |
| Sat 8/12 | New York Empire | DC Breeze | 19–24 | Playoffs – 1–1 |

2024
| Date | Home team | Away team | Final Score | Standing |
|---|---|---|---|---|
| Sat 4/27 | Salt Lake Shred | DC Breeze | 23–20 | 0–1 |
| Sun 5/5 | Philadelphia Phoenix | DC Breeze | 10–22 | 1–1 |
| Fri 5/10 | DC Breeze | Boston Glory | 12–11 | 2–1 |
| Sat 5/18 | DC Breeze | Philadelphia Phoenix | 24–23 (2OT) | 3–1 |
| Fri 5/31 | DC Breeze | Toronto Rush | 26–19 | 4–1 |
| Sun 6/2 | Boston Glory | DC Breeze | 16–15 | 4–2 |
| Sat 6/8 | DC Breeze | New York Empire | 16–14 | 5–2 |
| Sat 6/15 | Toronto Rush | DC Breeze | 15–23 | 6–2 |
| Sun 6/16 | Montreal Royal | DC Breeze | 20–21 | 7–2 |
| Sat 6/22 | DC Breeze | Montreal Royal | 24–16 | 8–2 |
| Fri 6/28 | DC Breeze | Carolina Flyers | 25–13 | 9–2 |
| Sat 7/20 | New York Empire | DC Breeze | 20–24 | 10–2 |
| Sat 8/10 | DC Breeze | Boston Glory | 16–14 | Playoffs – 1–0 |
| Fri 8/23 | DC Breeze | Minnesota Wind Chill | 13–16 | Playoffs – 1–1 |

2025
| Date | Home team | Away team | Final Score | Standing |
|---|---|---|---|---|
| Sat 4/26 | DC Breeze | Philadelphia Phoenix | 15–16 | 0–1 |
| Sat 5/3 | DC Breeze | Toronto Rush | 19–18 | 1–1 |
| Sat 5/10 | Carolina Flyers | DC Breeze | 20–18 | 2–1 |
| Sun 5/18 | DC Breeze | Boston Glory | 11–14 | 2–2 |
| Fri 5/30 | Toronto Rush | DC Breeze | 20–21 | 3–2 |
| Sat 5/31 | Montreal Royal | DC Breeze | 22–17 | 3–3 |
| Fri 6/6 | DC Breeze | New York Empire | 23–15 | 4–3 |
| Sat 6/14 | New York Empire | DC Breeze | 19–18 (2OT) | 4–4 |
| Fri 6/27 | DC Breeze | Montreal Royal | 26–14 | 5–4 |
| Sun 7/6 | Boston Glory | DC Breeze | 16–17 | 6–4 |
| Sat 7/12 | DC Breeze | Boston Glory | 20–16 | 7–4 |
| Sat 7/19 | Philadelphia Phoenix | DC Breeze | 24–15 | 7–5 |
| Sat 7/26 | DC Breeze | New York Empire | 23–12 | Playoffs – 1–0 |
| Sat 8/9 | Boston Glory | DC Breeze | 17–9 | Playoffs – 1–1 |

== All-time record by opponent ==
Regular Season
| Opponent | Wins | Losses | Ties | Win % |
|---|---|---|---|---|
| New Jersey Hammerheads (folded) | 3 | 0 | 0 | 100% |
| Pittsburgh Thunderbirds | 3 | 0 | 0 | 100% |
| Ottawa Outlaws (folded) | 10 | 2 | 0 | 83.3% |
| Philadelphia Phoenix | 22 | 7 | 1 | 75.0% |
| Rochester Dragons (folded) | 5 | 2 | 0 | 71.4% |
| Montreal Royal | 12 | 7 | 0 | 63.2% |
| Carolina Flyers (formerly Raleigh Flyers) | 6 | 2 | 0 | 75.0% |
| New York Empire | 14 | 18 | 0 | 43.8% |
| Toronto Rush | 11 | 14 | 0 | 44.0% |
| Atlanta Hustle | 1 | 1 | 0 | 50.0% |
| Tampa Bay Cannons (folded) | 2 | 0 | 0 | 100% |
| Boston Glory | 8 | 2 | 0 | 80.0% |
| Salt Lake Shred | 0 | 1 | 0 | 0% |

Playoffs
| Opponent | Wins | Losses | Win % |
|---|---|---|---|
| Montreal Royal | 1 | 0 | 100% |
| New York Empire | 2 | 3 | 40% |
| Philadelphia Phoenix | 1 | 0 | 100% |
| Toronto Rush | 0 | 4 | 0% |
| Raleigh Flyers | 0 | 1 | 0% |
| Boston Glory | 2 | 1 | 67% |
| Minnesota Wind Chill | 0 | 1 | 0% |

== Rosters ==
Rosters
| 2024 Roster | | 2023 Roster | | 2022 Roster | | 2021 Roster | | 2020 Roster | | 2019 Roster | | 2018 Roster | | 2017 Roster | | 2016 Roster | | 2015 Roster | | 2014 Roster | | 2013 Roster | |
|---|---|---|---|---|---|---|---|---|---|---|---|---|---|---|---|---|---|---|---|---|---|---|---|
| First Name | Last Name | First Name | Last Name | First Name | Last Name | First Name | Last Name | First Name | Last Name | First Name | Last Name | First Name | Last Name | First Name | Last Name | First Name | Last Name | First Name | Last Name | First Name | Last Name | First Name | Last Name |
| Rhys | Bergeron | Aaron | Bartlett | Aaron | Bartlett | Aaron | Bartlett | Jarrod | Banks | Jarrod | Banks | Austin | Bartenstein | John | Agan | John | Agan | Andrew | Allen | Peter | Anderson | Bill | Barnes |
| Mitchell | Blaha | Rhys | Bergeron | Colum | Bergeron | Colum | Bergeron | Quinn | Bergeron | Quinn | Bergeron | Rhys | Bergeron | Austin | Bartenstein | Andrew | Allen | Peter | Anderson | Jarail | Bajwa | Jake | Berzoff-Cohen |
| David | Bloodgood | David | Bloodgood | Rhys | Bergeron | Quinn | Bergeron | Rhys | Bergeron | David | Bloodgood | Quinn | Bergeron | Lloyd | Blake | David | Boylan-Kolchin | Jarnail | Bajwa | Tyler | DeGirolamo | Paul | Butterfoss |
| Elliot | Bonnet | Christian | Boxley | David | Bloodgood | Rhys | Bergeron | David | Bloodgood | Jay | Boyle | Christopher | Bernard | David | Bloodgood | Chuck | Cantone | David | Berg | Danny | Dennin | Eric | Clarkson |
| Zack | Burpee | Garrett | Braun | Christian | Boxley | David | Bloodgood | Garrett | Braun | Garrett | Braun | Lloyd | Blake | David | Boylan-Kolchin | Max | Cassell | Jim | Boley | Ben | Feng | Kevin | Connolly |
| Jace | Dean | David | Cranston | David | Cranston | Garrett | Braun | Cory | Broyles | Sam | Breckner | Christian | Boxley | Cory | Broyles | Nate | Castine | David | Boylan-Kolchin | Francisco | Hazera | Danny | Dennin |
| Moussa | Dia | Moussa | Dia | Moussa | Dia | Moussa | Dia | Max | Cassell | Max | Cassell | Cory | Broyles | Chuck | Cantone | David | Cranston | Zach | Branson | Russel | Howd | Joseph | DiPaula |
| Thomas | Edmonds | Thomas | Edmonds | Alexandre | Fall | Alexandre | Fall | Ethan | Fortin | Matt | Collum | Max | Cassell | Max | Cassell | Torn | Doi | Chip | Cobb | Alex | Jacoski | Greg | Esser |
| Alexandre | Fall | Alexandre | Fall | Frederick | Farah | Duncan | Fitzgerald | Kris | Harrison | Alexandre | Fall | Nate | Castine | Nate | Castine | Ben | Feng | Clay | Collins | Chris | Kocher | Evan | Feeney |
| Frederick | Farah | Frederick | Farah | Duncan | Fitzgerald | Ben "Dusty" | Green | Kevin | Healey | Kris | Harrison | David | Cranston | David | Cranston | Jonathan | Helton | Seth | Collins | Tyler | Kunsa | Jonathan | Ginsberg |
| Tanner | Gesell | Sasha | Frank-Stempel | Kevin | Healey | Kris | Harrison | Jeremy | Hess | Jeremy | Hess | Alexandre | Fall | Joe | Freund | Russel | Howd | Antoine | Davis | Mark | Lin | Kevin | Healey |
| Miles | Grovic | Miles | Grovic | Jeremy | Hess | Kevin | Healey | Delrico | Johnson | Cody | Johnson | Troy | Holland | Troy | Holland | Alex | Jacoski | Bryant | Dean | Jose | Maldonado | Isaac | Julien |
| Kevin | Healey | Kris | Harrison | Troy | Holland | Jeremy | Hess | Kenta | Kawaguchi | Kenta | Kawaguchi | Delrico | Johnson | Delrico | Johnson | Kyle | Johnson | Ben | Feng | Brett | Matzuka | Matt | Koh |
| Troy | Holland | Kevin | Healey | Delrico | Johnson | Kenta | Kawaguchi | Justin | Keller | Jeremy | Knoff | Matt | Kerrigan | Matt | Kerrigan | Matt | Kerrigan | Mark | Flores | Ryan | Nam | Jonathan | Kwan |
| Cole | Jurek | Troy | Holland | Kenta | Kawaguchi | Justin | Keller | Jeremy | Knopf | Danny | Krug | Kyle | Khalifa | Alan | Kolick | Alan | Kolick | Francisco | Hazera | Jonathan | Neeley | Josh | Mull |
| Brandon | Lamberty | Cole | Jurek | Jeremy | Knopf | Jeremy | Knopf | Xavier | Maxstadt | Alex | Liu | Aaron | Langley | Jonny | Malks | Nico | Lake | Troy | Holland | Josh | Norris | Burke | Nash |
| Isaac | Lee | Jeremy | Knopf | Alan | Kolick | Jonny | Malks | Rowan | McDonnell | Dennis | Maclaine | Alex | Liu | Brian | Marshall | Bob | Liu | Russel | Howd | Jon | Pressimone | Zach | Norrbom |
| Jonny | Malks | Brandon | Lamberty | Brandon | Lamberty | Xavier | Maxstadt | Anthony | McLean | Peter | Mancini | Jonny | Malks | Rowan | McDonnell | Peter | Mancini | AJ | Jacoski | Matt | Radhe | Freddy | Perlman |
| Charlie | McCutcheon | Isaac | Lee | Isaac | Lee | Rowan | McDonnell | Ray | Mendoza | Xavier | Maxstadt | Peter | Mancini | Eric | Miner | Brian | Marshall | Matt | Kerrigan | Logan | Rhyne | Glenn | Poole |
| Rowan | McDonnell | Jonny | Malks | Jonny | Malks | Colin | McLaughlin | AJ | Merriman | Rowan | McDonnell | Xavier | Maxstadt | Keven | Moldenhauer | Brett | Matzuka | Kyle | Khalifa | Aaron | Roberts | Matthew | Radhe |
| AJ | Merriman | Charlie | McCutcheon | Rowan | McDonnell | Anthony | McLean | Tyler | Monroe | Anthony | McLean | Rowan | McDonnell | Tyler | Monroe | Rowan | McDonnell | Nico | Lake | T.J. | Ryan | Carlos | Rodriguez |
| Tyler | Monroe | Rowan | McDonnell | Colin | McLaughlin | Ray | Mendoza | Jacques | Nissen | Ray | Mendoza | Eric | Miner | Ryan | Nam | Tyler | Monroe | Peter | Mancini | Brad | Scott | Liam | Shramko |
| Jacques | Nissen | Colin | McLaughlin | AJ | Merriman | Joseph | Merrill | Zach | Norrbom | AJ | Merriman | Matt | Neeley | Jonathan | Neeley | Jonathan | Neeley | Anthony | Mclean | Daniel | Selwyn | Justin | Solis |
| Gus | Norrbom | Joe | Merrill | Tyler | Monroe | AJ | Merriman | Houston | Parks | Matt | Neeley | Zach | Norrbom | Zach | Norrbom | Jon | Pressimone | Michael | Moses | Liam | Shramko | Jon | Pressimone |
| Zach | Norrbom | AJ | Merriman | Jacques | Nissen | Jacques | Nissen | Leo | Pierson | Zach | Norrbom | Houston | Parks | Nathan | Prior | Jordan | Queckboerner | Leo | Pepper | Justin | Solis | Tim | Ryan |
| Rami | Paust | Tyler | Monroe | Zach | Norrbom | Gus | Norrbom | Joe | Richards | Houston | Parks | Leo | Pierson | Joe | Richards | Matt | Radhe | Glenn | Poole | Jon | Stone | Daniel | Selwyn |
| Luke | Rehfuss | Jacques | Nissen | Leo | Pierson | Zach | Norrbom | Zac | Schakner | Leo | Pierson | Benjamin | Priess | Brad | Scott | Ben | Scharadin | Jon | Pressimone | Alex | Thorne | Tim | Spiridonov |
| Andrew | Roy | Gus | Norrbom | Luke | Rehfuss | Houston | Parks | David | Shields | Nathan | Prior | Nathan | Prior | David | Sheilds | Brad | Scott | Matt | Radhe | Sam | Trachtman | Bradley | Tinney |
| Xavier | Schafer | Zach | Norrbom | Joe | Richards | Leo | Pierson | Jasper | Tom | Joe | Richards | Joe | Richards | Markham | Shofner | Markham | Shofner | Brad | Scott | | | Owen | Williams |
| Will | Tober | Benjamin | Oort | David | Shields | Luke | Rehfuss | Kevin | Versteeg | David | Shields | Brad | Scott | Justin | Solis | Nicky | Spiva | Dan | Selwyn | | | Charles | Yu |
| Jasper | Tom | Rami | Paust | Ted | Sither | Joe | Richards | Kyle | Vezina | Cole | Sullivan | David | Shields | Ryan | Swift | Jeff | Wodatch | | | | | David | Zurbuchen |
| Ryan | Weaver | Luke | Rehfuss | Marcus | Thaw | David | Shields | Dane | Warner | Kevin | Versteeg | Ryan | Swift | Alexander | Taylor | | | | | | | | |
| Jeff | Wodatch | Andrew | Roy | Jasper | Tom | Jasper | Tom | Steven | Wartinbee | Kyle | Vezina | Marcus | Thaw | Marcus | Thaw | | | | | | | | |
| | | Xavier | Schafer | Kevin | Versteeg | Kevin | Versteeg | Gabe | Webster | John | Walden | John | Walden | John | Walden | | | | | | | | |
| | | Marcus | Thaw | Kyle | Vezina | Kyle | Vezina | Jeff | Wodatch | Dane | Warner | Gabe | Webster | Jeff | Wodatch | | | | | | | | |
| | | Jasper | Tom | Dane | Warner | Dane | Warner | | | Jeff | Wodatch | Jeff | Wodatch | | | | | | | | | | |
| | | Dane | Warner | Steven | Wartinbee | Steven | Wartinbee | | | | | | | | | | | | | | | | |
| | | Steven | Wartinbee | Gabe | Webster | Gabe | Webster | | | | | | | | | | | | | | | | |
| | | Jeff | Wodatch | Jeff | Wodatch | Jeff | Wodatch | | | | | | | | | | | | | | | | |
| | | David | Zimmerman | David | Zimmerman | | | | | | | | | | | | | | | | | | |
