= Raleigh Flyers =

Raleigh Flyers may refer to:

- Raleigh Flyers (soccer), former name of Raleigh Express, a now-defunct club soccer team in Raleigh, NC
- Raleigh Flyers (AUDL), former name of Carolina Flyers, an American Ultimate Disc League team in Raleigh, NC
