= Madison Radicals =

American Ultimate Disc League team

- Sport: Ultimate
- Founded: 2013
- League: Ultimate Frisbee Association
- Division: Central
- Based in: Madison, Wisconsin
- Stadium: Breese Stevens Field
- Colours: Teal blue and chartreuse
- Head Coach: Tim DeByl
- Overall record: 100–26
- Championships: 1
- Playoff berths: 6
- Website: watchufa.com/radicals

The Madison Radicals are a professional ultimate team based in Madison, Wisconsin. The Radicals compete in the Ultimate Frisbee Association (UFA) as a member of the Central Division. The team plays its home games at Breese Stevens Field in downtown Madison. Since the team's inception in 2013, they have won five regular season divisional titles in eight seasons. After losing in the AUDL championship games in 2013 and 2015, the Radicals claimed its first championship in 2018. Madison also hosted AUDL Championship Weekends in 2016, 2018 and 2022, winning the championship in 2018.

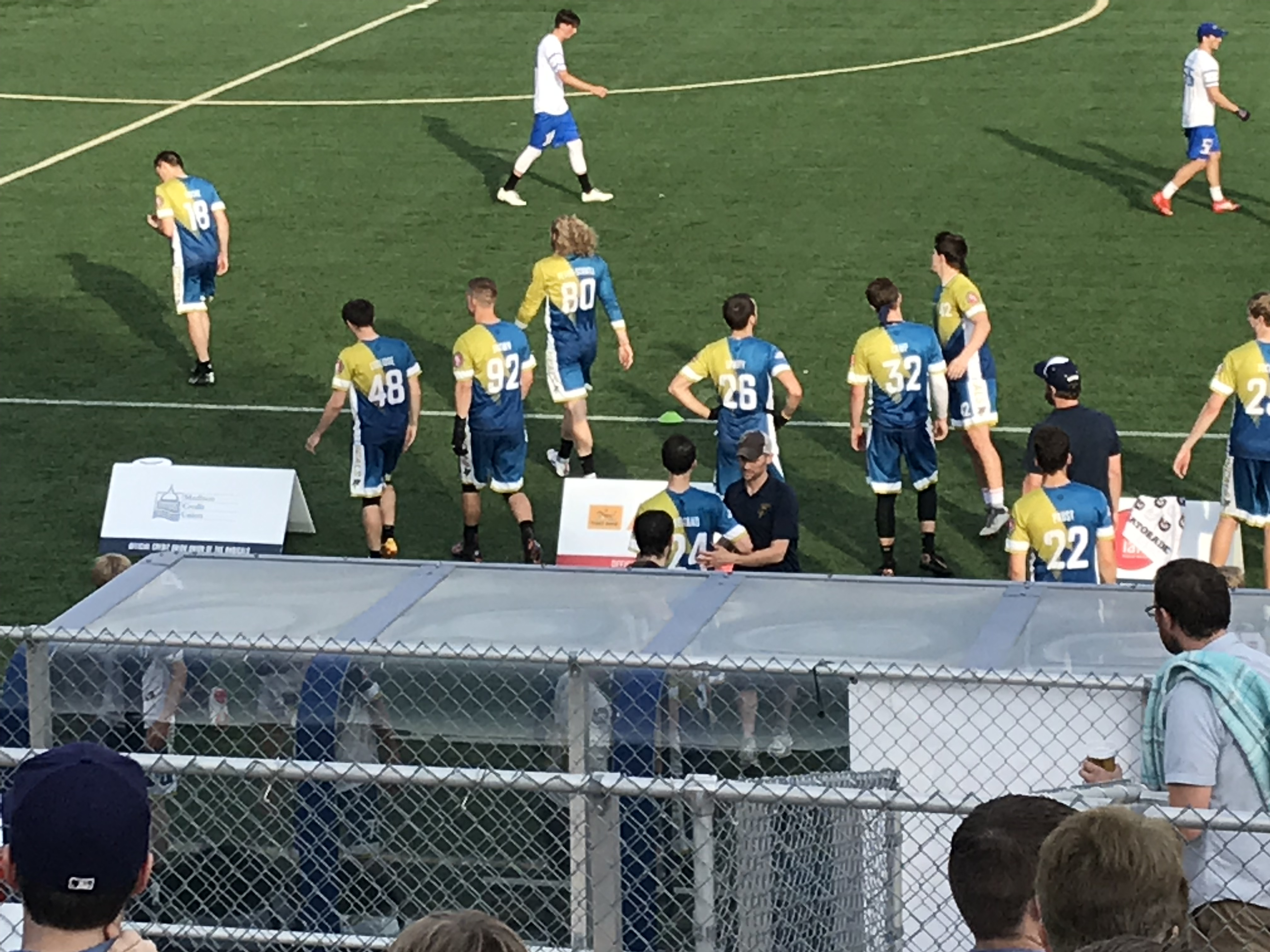
The Radicals during a home game at Breese Stevens Field in 2019.

== History ==
=== 2012 ===
In summer of 2012, it was reported that Madison would be home to an American Ultimate Disc League team, the Radicals. Slated to join the AUDL for its second season in 2013, effort organizer Tim DeByl stated that he hoped to get Breese Stevens Field as a venue for the team's home games.

=== 2013 ===
The Radicals hosted their first tryout in January 2013. Over 60 players attended the combine, with the tryout reaching into the middle of the night.

After winning their first-ever game against the Chicago Wildfire, the Radicals parlayed defensive success all the way to the AUDL championship game, losing to the Toronto Rush.

=== 2014 ===
The Radicals were again successful in their second year of play, going undefeated at home during the regular season. Peter Graffy set the AUDL single-season blocks record with 49. The Radicals beat the Indianapolis AlleyCats 25–16 in the Midwest Division championship game to advance to their second straight AUDL Championship Weekend appearance. After leading early in the AUDL semi-finals, Madison ended up losing to the eventual champion San Jose 23–20.

=== 2015 ===
Madison once again went undefeated at home on their way to a 13–1 regular season record. San Jose eliminated Madison for the second straight year, this time in the AUDL championship game.

=== 2016 ===
The Radicals went undefeated in regular-season play, only the third such season in league history. The team set a regular season attendance record at the time with over 1200 fans coming out on June 4 to watch the AUDL Game of the Week. A close loss to the Seattle Cascades during Championship Weekend, which was held at Breese Stevens, snapped a years-long home winning streak for Madison.

=== 2017 ===
The Radicals would claim their fourth consecutive regular season Midwest Division title in 2017, and advanced to the AUDL semi-finals, where they were bounced by eventual champion San Francisco in the semi-finals.

=== 2018 ===
The Radicals won another Midwest Division title in 2018. Robyn Fennig (Wiseman) became the first female player in team history. Madison played host to AUDL Championship Weekend for the second time in three seasons. This time, the Radicals went all the way, beating the Los Angeles Aviators 24–19 in the semi-finals before taking down the Dallas Roughnecks 20–16 in the 2018 AUDL championship game.

=== 2019 ===
In their third game of the 2019 season, the Radicals lost at home to the Minnesota Wind Chill, their first home loss in 2,190 days. The Radicals eventually missed the playoffs for the first time in franchise history, finishing 6–6 on the season.

=== 2020 ===
The 2020 AUDL Season was cancelled due to the COVID-19 pandemic

=== 2021 ===
The Radicals missed the playoffs for the second straight year, finishing 7–5.

=== 2022 ===
The Radicals became the first AUDL team to surpass 100 wins after beating the Pittsburgh Thunderbirds 18–16 on May 7. They finished 4–8, the team's first losing season in history, missing the playoffs for three consecutive years. Championship Weekend 11 was hosted at Breese Stevens, the third time for the venue.

=== Season-by-season results ===
Year-by-year
Year	Reg. season	Div Finish Reg Season	Playoffs
2013	13–3	2nd	Lost AUDL championship
2014	12–2	1st	Lost AUDL semi-finals
2015	13–1	1st	Lost AUDL championship
2016	14–0	1st	Lost AUDL semi-finals
2017	12–2	1st	Lost AUDL semi-finals
2018	12–2	1st	Won AUDL championship
2019	6–6	5th	Did not qualify
2021	7–5	3rd	Did not qualify
2022	6–6	4th	Did not qualify
2023	4–8	5th	Did not qualify
2024	8–4	2nd	Lost quarter-finals
Total	107–39		11–6

== Venue ==
The Radicals have played every home game at Breese Stevens Field, located in downtown Madison, Wisconsin.

Sporting positions
Preceded by San Francisco FlameThrowers	{{{title}}} 2018	Succeeded by New York Empire
