= Breese Stevens Field =

Athletic field in Madison, Wisconsin

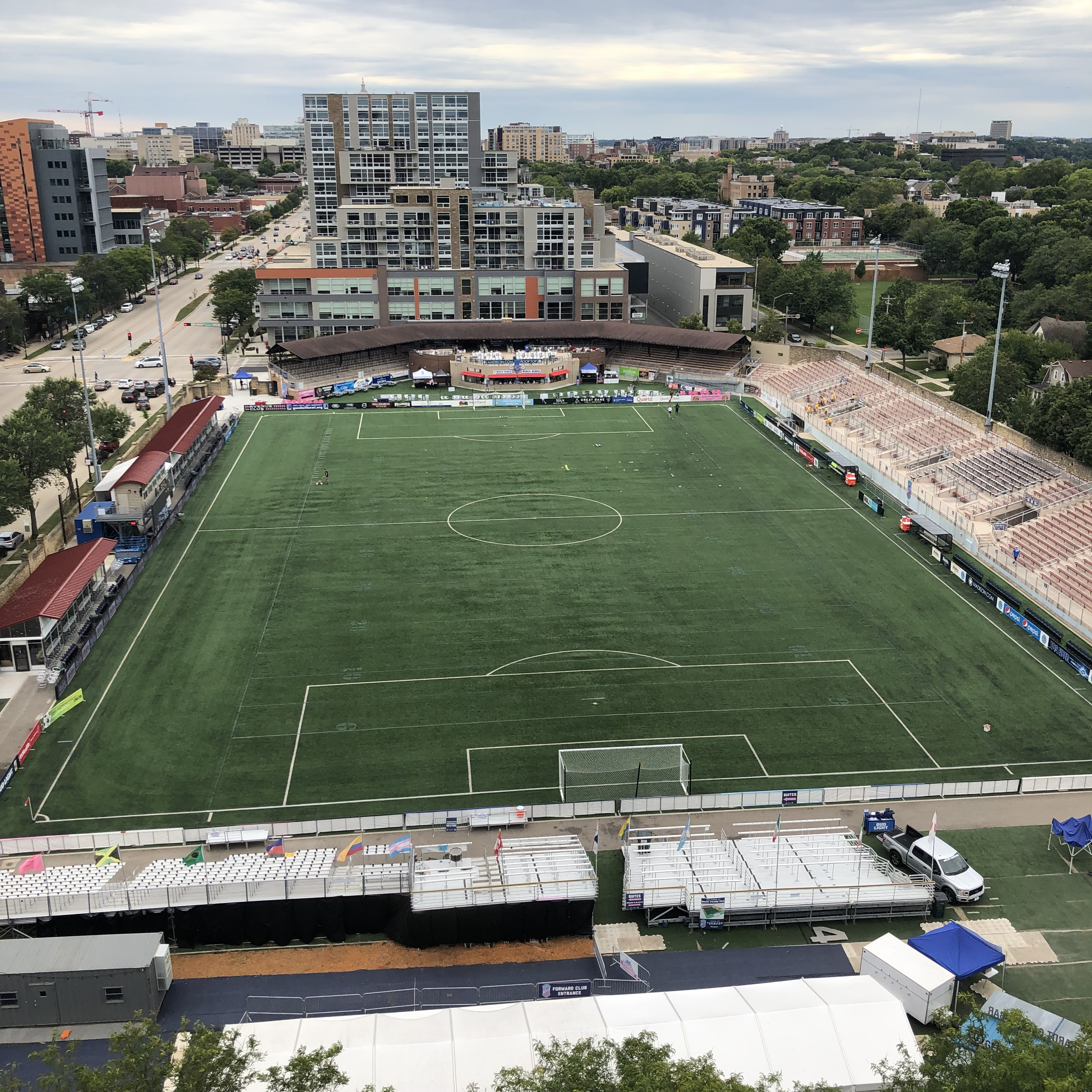
- Aerial shot of Breese Stevens Field in 2019
- Interactive map of Breese Stevens Field
- Address: 917 E Mifflin St; Madison, WI 53703-2831
- Location: Tenney-Lapham
- Coordinates: 43.08306°N 89.37306°W
- Owner: City of Madison Parks Division
- Operator: Big Top Sports & Entertainment
- Capacity: 5,000 (sporting events); 9,333 (concerts)
- Public transit: Metro Transit

Construction
- Opened: May 5, 1926
- Renovated: 1930; 1934; 1939; 1945; 1947; 1982; 2014; 2018
- Architect: Claude & Starck

Tenants
- Madison Blues (WIL/WSL/TSL/IIIL) (1926–1942); Madison Muskies (MWL) (1982–1983); Edgewood College Eagles (NCAA) (1990–2019); Madison 56ers (UPSL) (2005–present); Madison Radicals (UFA) (2013–present); Madison East High School (WIAA) (2015–present); Forward Madison FC (USL1) (2019–present); Rally Madison FC (USLW) (2026–present)

Website
- Venue website

U.S. National Register of Historic Places
- Designated: August 3, 2015
- Reference no.: 15000502

Breese Stevens Field, officially Breese Stevens Municipal Athletic Field, is a multi-purpose stadium in Madison, Wisconsin. Located eight blocks northeast of the Wisconsin State Capitol on the Madison Isthmus, it is the oldest extant masonry grandstand in Wisconsin.

The field is named in honor of Breese J. Stevens, a mayor of Madison and later a University of Wisconsin–Madison regent. His widow, Elizabeth Farmer Stevens, enlisted her daughter's brother in law Joseph W. "Bud" Jackson to sell the marshy block her husband acquired decades earlier. Jackson suggested the block should become an athletic field, and be named for Mr. Stevens. The complex was designated as a Madison Landmark in 1995 and was accepted for inclusion on the National Register of Historic Places and the Wisconsin State Register of Historic Places in 2014.

The venue currently seats nearly 5,000, which can be expanded to 9,333 for concerts.

It is home to the USL League One soccer team Forward Madison FC; the USL W League soccer team Rally Madison FC; Madison East High School teams; the Ultimate Frisbee Association team Madison Radicals; and the Madison 56ers amateur soccer team. In its history, the field has also hosted ice skating, boxing, wrestling, Australian rules football, lacrosse, track and field, midget car racing, rodeos, circuses, drum and bugle corps competitions, concerts, and fraternal and religious gatherings.

== History ==
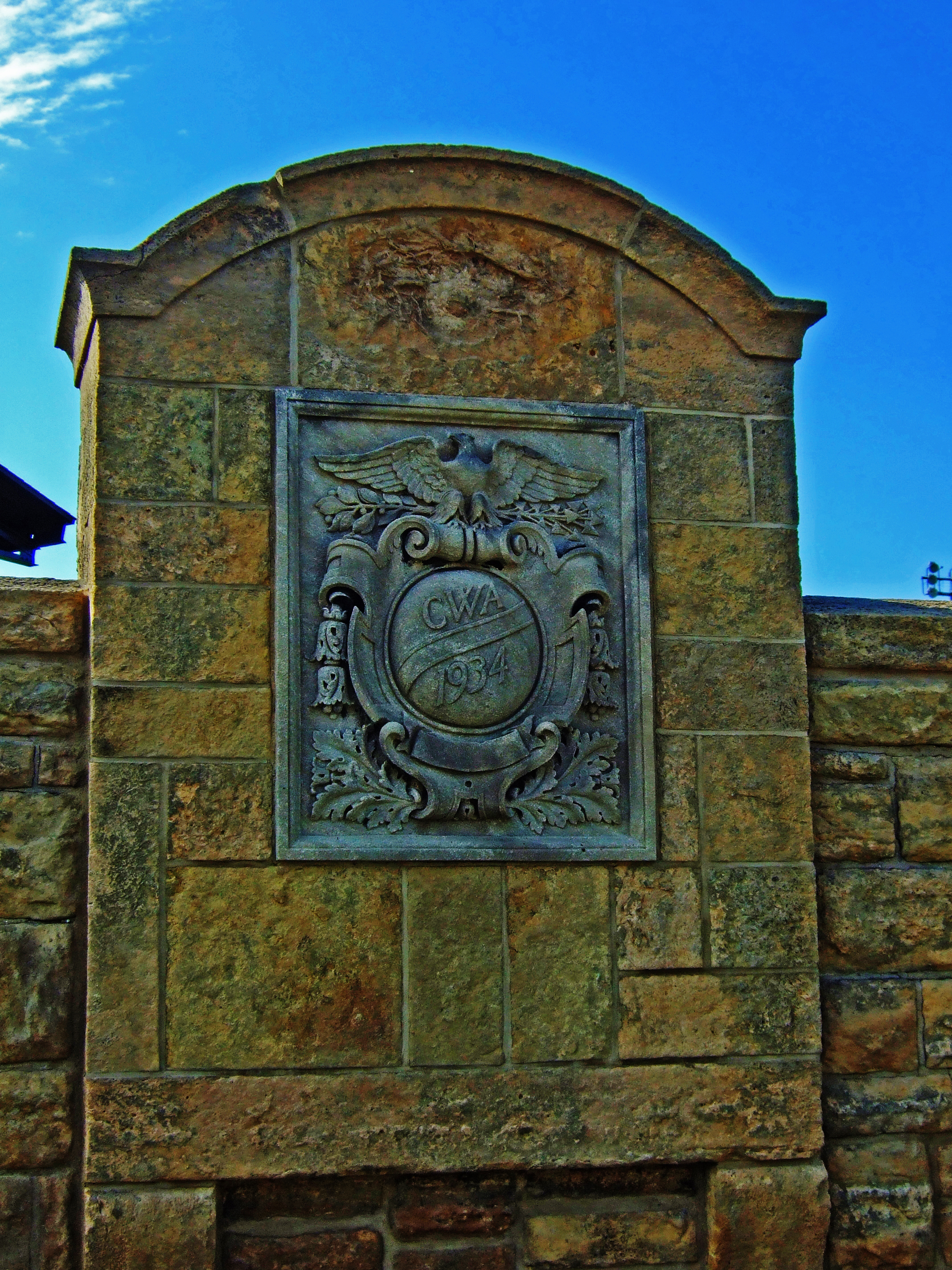
CWA marker (1934)

=== Acquiring the park ===
Addressing the concern that Madison's sports facilities were insufficient, the city council began efforts to establish a new athletic field in 1922. After first trying to obtain the land by donation, a joint committee of the council and the Association of Commerce considered sites such as Olbrich Park and what is today's Georgia O'Keeffe Middle School playground.

As early as 1920 Stevens’ widow Elizabeth Farmer Stevens contacted her daughter’s brother-in-law, Joseph “Bud” Jackson, business manager of the Jackson Clinic, to arrange the sale of the Stevens estate's marshy property on East Washington Avenue, which had sat idle for 40 years. Twenty-three years earlier Jackson had been the manager of the Madison High School football team, which had no home field. Jackson had occasionally asked university regent Breese Stevens to assist his team in gaining use of Camp Randall, the stadium of the University of Wisconsin. Considering that Madison still had no athletic field in 1920, Jackson examined the Stevens block and decided it should be the site of a stadium for the high schools. He suggested to Mrs. Stevens that she sell the land to the city and have the field named for her late husband, in honor of his assistance to the high school team a generation earlier.

=== Construction ===
The city of Madison built the brick and concrete grandstands in 1926. The original grandstand, designed by the Madison architectural firm of Claude and Starck in the Mediterranean Revival style and dedicated on May 5, 1926. On that day, with nearly 4,000 people present, Wisconsin Governor John J. Blaine threw the first pitch and the Madison Blues lost to the Beloit Fairies 7–5 in a Wisconsin-Illinois League contest.

The stone wall surrounding the perimeter was built in 1934 as a project of the Civil Works Administration using quarry rock from Madison's Hoyt Park. In 1939 the two grandstands were joined and a wooden press box was added. Three heating units were installed in 1945, and two years later the new electric scoreboard was erected.

=== Lighting the field ===
In 1930 the Madison Blues played the California Owls and the Kansas City Monarchs, two teams that toured with their own floodlights. Attendance was impressive enough that a trio of local electrical contractors headed by Otto Harloff formed the Madison Entertainment Corporation.They offered to outfit Breese with floodlights for no upfront cost, but would recoup its outlay with a percentage of the gate receipts. After the city council approved their plan, the group purchased and installed 90 Crouse-Hinds floodlights on ten 90-foot towers for $29,100, making Breese Stevens Field became the first sports facility in Wisconsin outfitted with lights. A $4,000 public address system was also installed, as well as a concessions area underneath the grandstand, serving coffee, soft drinks, sandwiches and candy. Preceded by a parade, the new lights' official debut was a Blues baseball game on May 15, 1931.

The ability to hold events at night multiplied the use of the facility. The lights were credited with saving scholastic sports when high schools began collecting one-third of the gate receipts from their night games. The lights also proved a boon to Madison Blues baseball, drawing fans from home and away. The team received 50% of the gate, and their schedule became flexible to host more exhibition games. The first-night boxing match was in September, and the first-night football game was held the next night, between the Chicago Cardinals and the Harley Mills. While respecting the precedence of free recreational events hosted by the city, the Madison Entertainment Corporation became the promoter of nearly all night events.

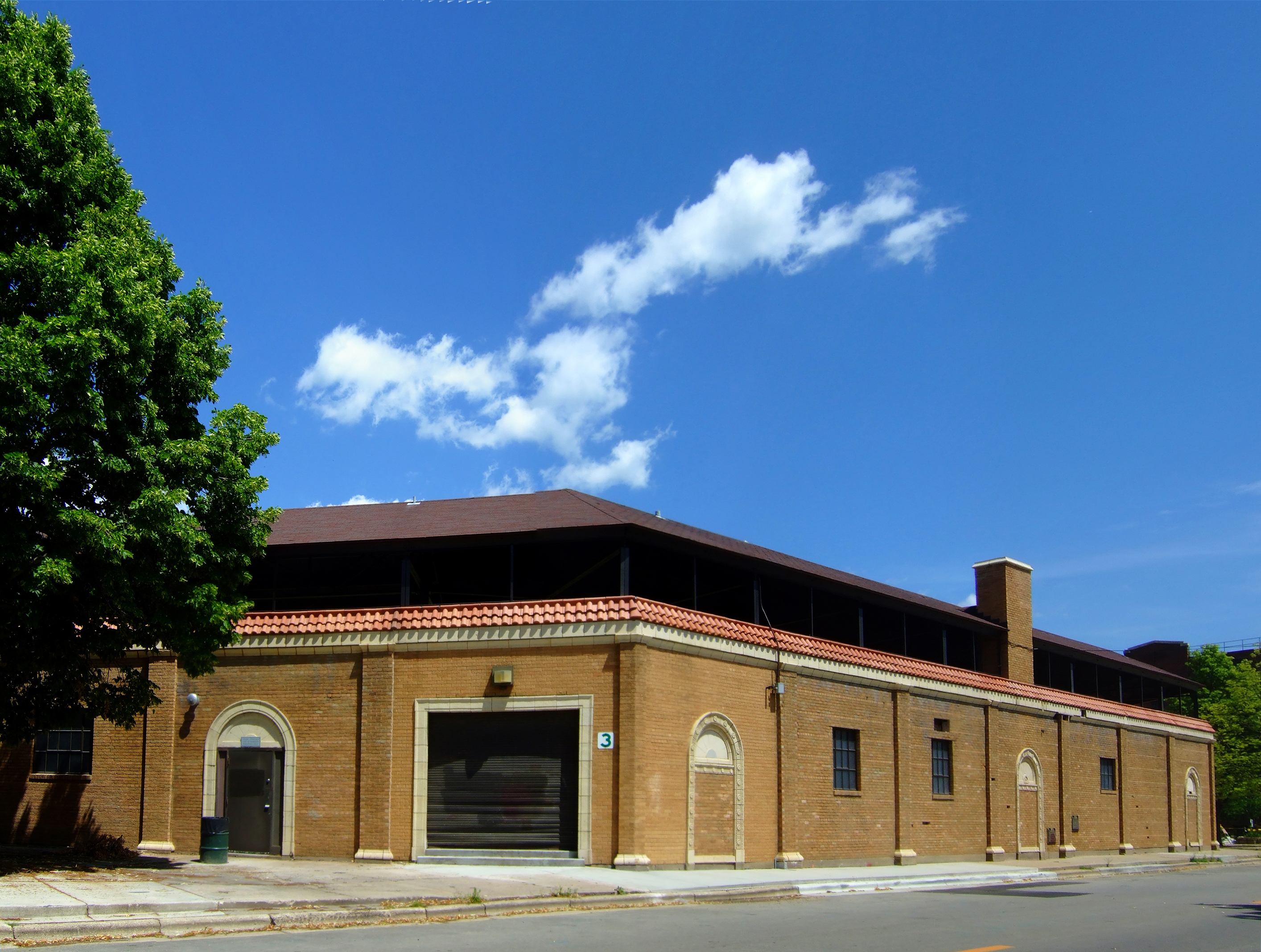
The fieldhouse in 2009

=== Decline ===
By the late 1960s, Breese Stevens Field lost its status as the city's premier athletic complex as modern facilities, such as Mansfield Stadium, began to appear in suburban Madison.

On August 3, 1968, a weekly teen dance held at Breese broke out in racially charged fights, with the violence escalating outside when a black teenager was struck by a car that was then attacked. The "Breese Stevens incident" prompted criticism of Madison police, and led to a city investigation of local race relations.

As Breese further showed its age in the 1970s, proposals were made for the city to use the property for other purposes. In 1972, Madison Mayor Bill Dyke supported placing a long-anticipated civic auditorium there. Three years later, the city removed legal obstacles to making the field part of a planned East Washington Avenue campus for Madison Area Technical College, but support for the site dropped. A 1979 estimate for restoring the facility was put at $240,000 (equivalent to $1,064,649 in 2025).

=== Revival ===
In 1981, the city council voted to allocate $60,000 to demolish the grandstand and shore up the exterior wall and Mifflin Street bleachers, with the city parks department noting they had "letters on file dating back to 1967 that warn of structural problems." A public outcry from residents caused the plan to be scrapped and saved the stadium.

Minor league baseball returned to Breese on April 27, 1982, when the Madison Muskies made their debut there before adopting Warner Park as their home field. In 1983, the city council voted to allocate $230,000 to gradually restore the park by fixing the grandstand roof, sagging walls and broken toilets. Artificial turf replaced the original grass field in 2014.

Breese Stevens Field was added to the U.S. National Register of Historic Places on August 3, 2015.

In 2018, prior to Forward Madison FC’s arrival, the field received upgrades, including new bathrooms, a concession stand, and more seating, upgrading the capacity to an estimated 5,000 people.

== Events ==
Upon its inception, Breese Stevens Field became the premier site for Madison's major athletic events outside the University of Wisconsin–Madison. A multi-purpose facility with a cinder track, the field was employed year-round for sports, ranging from marbles tournaments to National Football League games. Currently, it is the home field for USL League One soccer team Forward Madison FC.

=== Baseball ===
As a baseball stadium, Breese Stevens featured a short 240-foot right field wall. The stadium was the home of the semi-professional Madison Blues from 1926 to 1942. Founded by the Madison Athletic Association and captained by manager Eddie Lenehan, the Blues were first an independent team before joining the Wisconsin-Illinois League in 1926. They won the championship of the newly formed Tri-State League in 1938, defeating the Sheboygan Chairmakers. They joined the Three-I League in 1940.

The field also held special exhibition games with the Blues facing Major League Baseball teams, such as the Chicago Cubs in a 1–1 tie, the Chicago White Sox in a 13–3 loss, and the St. Louis Browns, in addition to games against Negro league teams and traveling clubs like the House of David. In 1947 legendary pitcher Satchel Paige and the Negro leagues' Kansas City Monarchs defeated the Industrial League All-Stars 14–5. Warren Spahn, later the star left-handed pitcher for the Milwaukee Braves, took the Breese mound many times in 1941 as a member of the visiting Evansville Bees. Although he was known as a Wisconsin Badgers football player, Elroy "Crazylegs" Hirsch belted a grand slam home run in an exhibition baseball game in 1944 World War II fundraising event that raised $22,000 in war bonds, including $3,000 for the autographed bat that Hirsch used. In 1946, the New York Yankees held a three-day tryout camp at Breese.

In the spring of 1932, the Madison City Council opened the field's gates to amateur baseball, allowing twenty teams in two leagues to play free games on Sundays. The diamond was also used by the Wisconsin Badgers baseball team and the Madison Industrial League, which formed in 1943.

National league softball games were first played there in 1933, with Madison defeating Beaver Dam, 21–1. Girls' softball games were held as early as 1944.

==== Football ====
The field hosted one National Football League regular-season game, when the 1929 Chicago Bears moved a game to Madison due to a scheduling conflict with Wrigley Field, a ballpark the Bears shared with the Cubs. Legendary halfback Red Grange helped the Bears defeat the Minneapolis Red Jackets 19–6, before a crowd of 7,500.

Two NFL exhibition games were played at Breese: in 1927, the Milwaukee Badgers were beaten by the Duluth Eskimos, 32–0. In 1931, star fullback Ernie Nevers led his Chicago Cardinals to trounce the Chicago Mills, 25–0.

High school football games were a staple of the field's schedule for many years, with nearly all local high school home games played there. For many years Madison East and Central High Schools made a tradition of facing off on Armistice Day. High school football returned in 2015 when Madison East resumed playing its varsity home games at the field.

=== Soccer ===
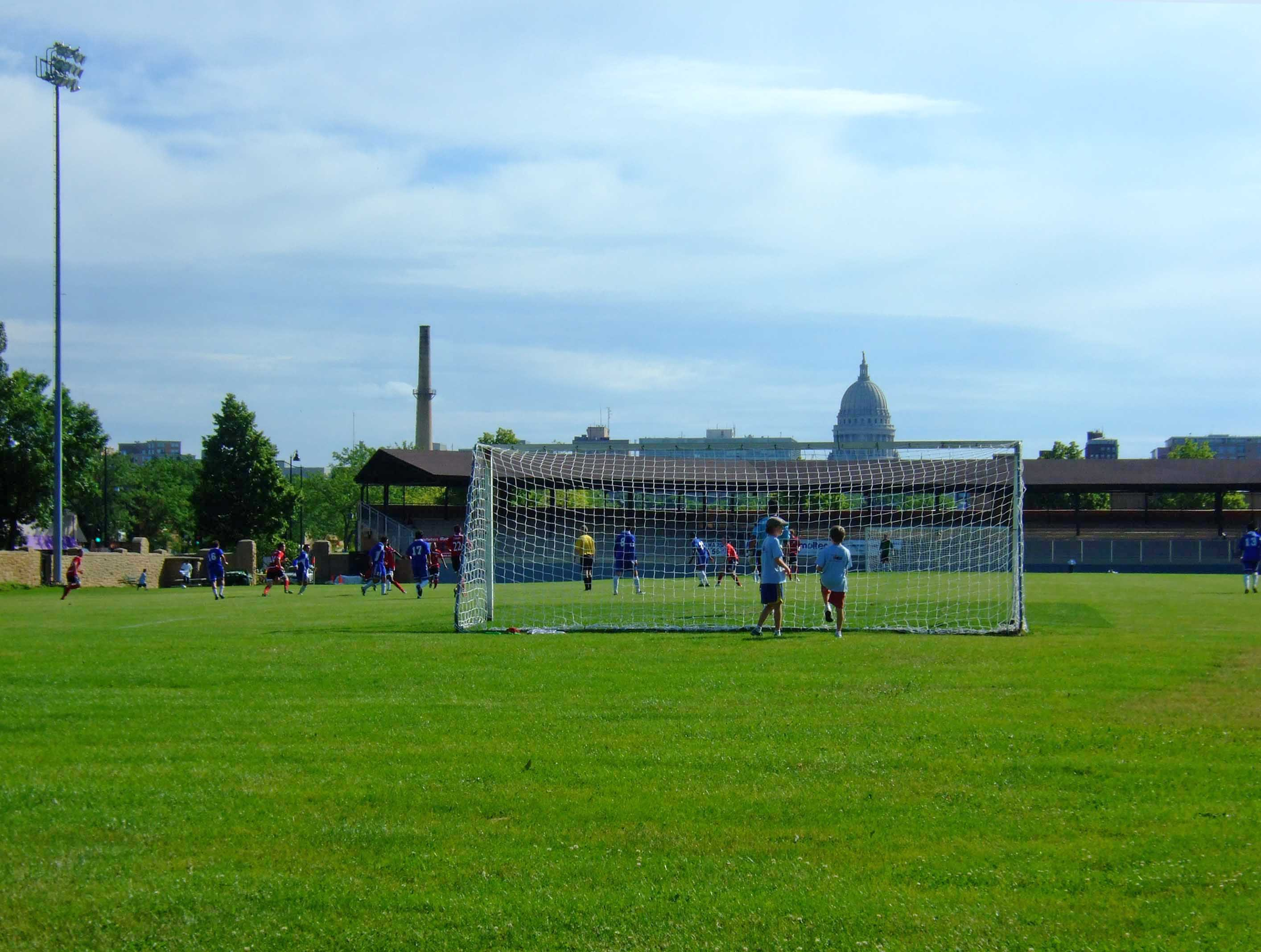
A soccer game on July 12, 2009

The stadium hosted Wisconsin Interscholastic Athletic Association soccer tournaments from 1989 to 2002 and was also the home field for the Madison East and Madison La Follette high school teams. Since 2005, the Madison 56ers of the amateur UPSL have played at the stadium.

Professional soccer came to Breeze Stevens field in 2019 with Forward Madison FC of USL League One. In their inaugural season they had an average home attendance of 4,292, the highest in the league.

On August 16, 2025, Forward Madison owners Big Top Events announced the creation of a semi-professional women's team to play in the USL W League in 2026, later named Rally Madison FC.

=== Other sports ===
Jesse Owens, gold medalist sprinter of the 1936 Berlin Olympics, ran in three exhibition races at the field in 1938 as part of an in-game promotion at a matchup between the Madison Blues and the Fort Wayne Harvesters.

The Madison Stampede rodeo event was held over six days in 1931.

In 1938, midget car races were held before being banned the next year over concerns of noise and damage to the field's track.

Since 2013, the Madison Radicals of the Ultimate Frisbee Association (UFA) have played their home games at the field. The league has held its championship weekend at Breese Stevens Field a league-high four times: in 2016, 2018, 2022, and 2025. The 2018 finals ended with the Radicals winning their first league championship on home turf. The championship will return to the stadium in 2026 as the first consecutive championship host in UFA history.

On June 27th, 2026, the Madison Scouts Drum and Bugle Corps and other performing arts ensembles in Wisconsin performed at the field to commemorate the field's 100th anniversary.
