= Indianapolis AlleyCats =

Ultimate frisbee team based in Indiana, US

- Sport: Ultimate frisbee
- Founded: 2012
- League: Ultimate Frisbee Association
- Division: Central
- Based in: Indianapolis, Indiana
- Stadium: Grand Park Events Center
- Colors: Green, White and Black
- Head coach: Nathan Bussberg
- Website: www.myalleycats.com

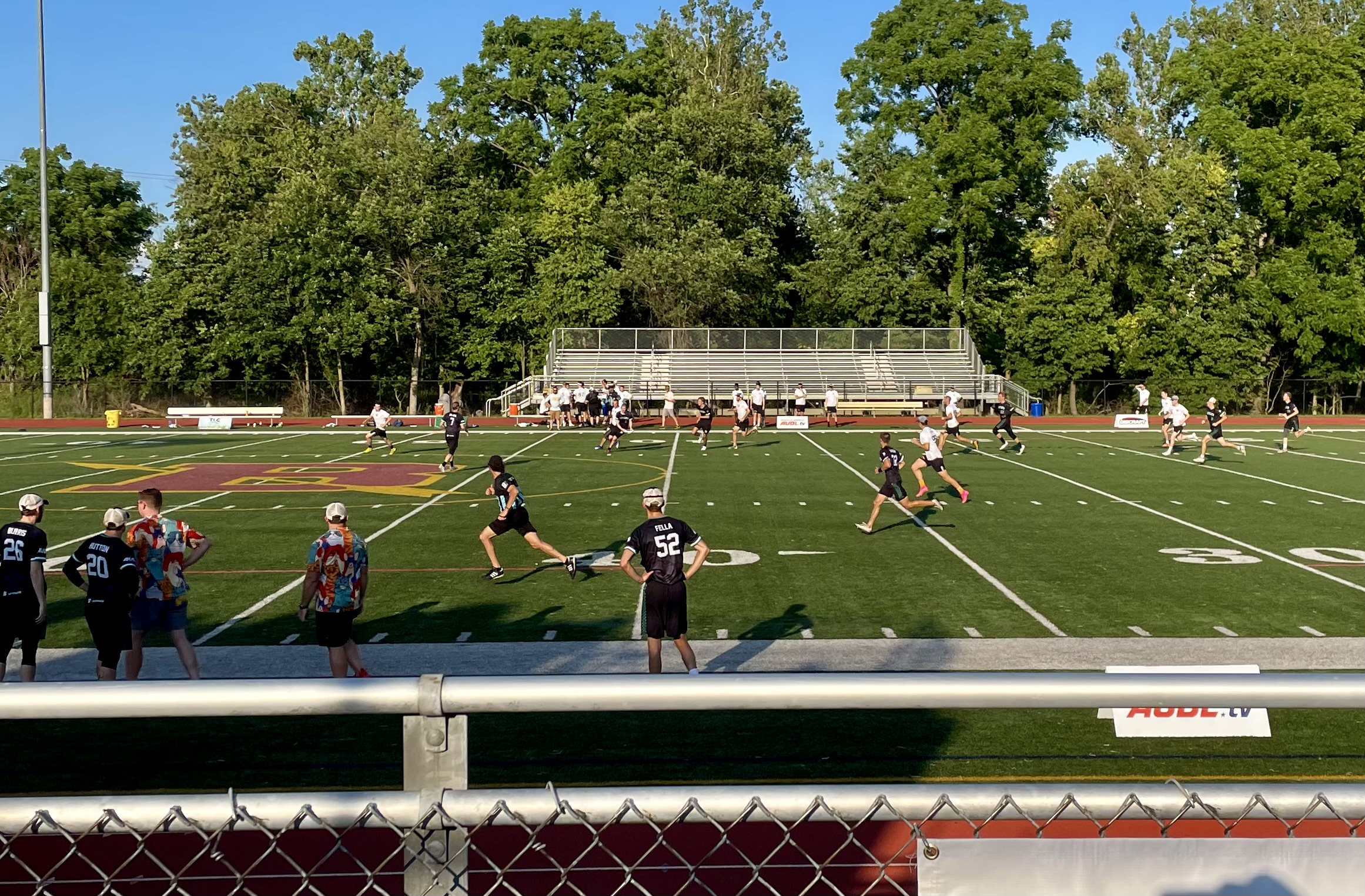
Indianapolis AlleyCats play Pittsburgh Thunderbirds on July 15, 2023, at Brebeuf Jesuit Preparatory School.

The Indianapolis AlleyCats or Indy AlleyCats are a professional ultimate team based in the Indianapolis metropolitan area. The AlleyCats compete in the Ultimate Frisbee Association (UFA) as a member of the Central Division. In their first year, the AlleyCats competed in the league championship, losing to the Philadelphia Spinners.

The AlleyCats play at Kuntz Stadium in Indianapolis. The team has called Grand Park home since midway through the 2018 season. Prior to Grand Park, the AlleyCats played home games at Roncalli Stadium during the 2012–2018 seasons except the 2013 & 2014 campaigns, when they were based out of Kuntz Stadium.

Historic Indianapolis AlleyCats players include Cameron Brock (all-time leading goal scorer in league history), Travis Carpenter, Rick Gross, Jake Fella, Levi Jacobs, Nick Hutton, Keenan Plew, Kyle Cox, Lucas Coniaris, Brodie Smith and Jonathan Helton.

As of the 2026 UFA season, following the folding of the Detroit Mechanix, the Alleycats are the last remaining original franchise of the league.

== Season-by-season results ==
Year	Regular season record	Divisional finish place	Playoffs result
2012	8-7	1st	Lost in championship game
2013	9-7	3rd	Lost in first round
2014	9-5	3rd	Lost in first round
2015	7-7	4th	Did not qualify
2016	8-6	4th	Did not qualify
2017	5-9	4th	Did not qualify
2018	11-3	2nd	Lost in the divisional round
2019	8-4	1st	Lost in semifinals
2020	-	-	Season cancelled due to the COVID-19 pandemic.
2021	3-9	5th	Did not qualify
2022	6-6	3rd	Lost in first round
2023	9-3	2nd	Lost in divisional round
2024	6-6	4th	Did not qualify
2025	4-8	4th	Did not qualify
2026	6-6	3rd	Lost in divisional round
