= Boston Glory =

Professional ultimate frisbee team

- Sport: Ultimate
- Founded: 2019
- League: Ultimate Frisbee Association
- Division: East
- Based in: Medford, Massachusetts
- Stadium: Hormel Stadium
- Owners: Peter Collery; Robert Ruocco
- Head Coach: Sam Rosenthal
- Championships: 1 (2025)
- Division titles: 1 (2025)
- Playoff berths: 3
- Website: watchufa.com/glory

The Boston Glory are a professional ultimate team based in Greater Boston area. The Glory compete in the Ultimate Frisbee Association (UFA) as a member of the East Division. The team was announced on December 4, 2019, and played its first season in 2021 owing to the cancellation of the UFA 2020 season due to the COVID-19 pandemic. The team won its first-ever UFA championship in 2025.

== History ==
On September 27, 2019, the UFA announced that franchise rights had been sold for the Boston area, and that the ownership group was looking for operating personnel with the goal of beginning play in the 2020 season. On December 4, the team was announced as an expansion franchise for the 2020 season. Former ultimate players Peter Collery and Robert Ruocco were announced as co-owners, and Mat Little and Jay Talerman were announced as general manager and director of operations, respectively. The team was also confirmed to compete in the league's newly-realigned East division. On December 19, the team announced its name as "Glory," citing the movie Glory, the nickname of the American flag, Old Glory, and a Boston-area club ultimate team named "Death or Glory." Sam Rosenthal was named as the head coach in January 2020, and remains one of the longest-serving head coaches in the UFA today.

== Season-by-season Results ==
Season	GP	W	L	W-L%	Regular Season	Playoffs
2021	12	5	7	.417	5th, Atlantic Division	DNQ
2022	12	4	8	.333	4th, East Division	DNQ
2023	12	7	5	.583	3rd, East Division	Loss, first round (DC Breeze)
2024	13	10	3	.769	2nd, East Division	Loss, division championship (DC Breeze)
2025	12	9	3	.750	1st, East Division	UFA Champions
2026	12	11	1	.916	1st, East Division	Loss, division championship (New York Empire)
