= Pittsburgh Thunderbirds =

Professional ultimate frisbee team

- Nickname: T-Birds
- Founded: 2015
- League: Ultimate Frisbee Association
- Division: Central
- Based in: Pittsburgh, Pennsylvania
- Stadium: F.N.B. Stadium
- Colours: Black, Charcoal Grey and Gold
- Owners: Darren Shultz; Dave Berg
- Head coach: David Berg
- National championships: 0
- Division titles: 0
- Playoff berths: 4
- Mascot: T-Bolt
- Website: watchufa.com/thunderbirds

The Pittsburgh Thunderbirds are a professional ultimate team based in Pittsburgh, Pennsylvania. The Thunderbirds compete in the Ultimate Frisbee Association (UFA) as a member of the Central Division. They play their home games at F.N.B. Stadium, a soccer stadium in Pittsburgh's Station Square.

== History ==
=== Founding ===
Pittsburgh has long been considered a hotbed for ultimate, with strong youth programs and adult club teams. Through the 2010s, the University of Pittsburgh's ultimate club team was a national powerhouse, winning back-to-back National Championships in 2012 and 2013 and finishing second in 2018, with multiple former players going on to compete in both the American Ultimate Disc League and Major League Ultimate.

A Pittsburgh-based franchise for the AUDL was announced via a private Pittsburgh ultimate Facebook group in June 2014, under the ownership of Dr. Tracy Neuendorf. Andrew Gardner (stepson of Neuendorf) and Elliot Diamond were announced as the team's inaugural general manager and assistant general manager. Gardner and others polled local players and fans at MARS (Pittsburgh's annual mixed Ultimate tournament) with slips of paper listing eighteen potential names. "Thunderbirds" was announced as the winning choice on July 9, 2014.

=== 2015 ===
The Pittsburgh Thunderbirds finished 2nd in the Midwest division with a 12–2 record, behind the Madison Radicals who finished 13–1. The Madison Radicals lone loss was to the Thunderbirds on May 2, 2015, at Founder's Field in Pittsburgh.

On June 12, 2015, the Thunderbirds were featured on ESPN3's game of the week against the Chicago Wildfire, dropping the contest 19–16 for their 2nd loss of the 2015 season.

Due to scheduling conflicts, the Midwest playoffs had to be played on the same day, July 25, 2015. The #3 seed Chicago Wildfire met the #2 seeded Thunderbirds at a neutral site outside of Madison, Wisconsin at 4:00PM local time. In overtime, Max Thorne threw the go-ahead goal to Aaron Watson to secure the 24–23 victory.

3 hours later, the Thunderbirds went on to face the #1 seeded Madison Radicals at Breese Stevens Field in Madison, Wisconsin. The Thunderbirds would go on to lose the Midwest Championship, 24–21 after Tyler DeGirolamo exited the game with a recurring leg injury.

2015 Regular Season Results
Date	Opponent	Score	Record
4/11/15	@ Indianapolis Alleycats	28–20 W	1–0
4/25/15	Cincinnati Revolution	30–16 W	2–0
5/2/15	@ Madison Radicals	24–18 L	2–1
5/3/15	@ Minnesota WindChill	30–17 W	3–1
5/9/15	Minnesota WindChill	28–22 W	4–1
5/30/15	Detroit Mechanix	44–20 W	5–1
6/6/15	Madison Radicals	26–22 W	6–1
6/12/15	@ Chicago Wildfire	19–16 L	6–2
6/13/15	@ Detroit Mechanix	34–21 W	7–2
6/20/15	@ Cincinnati Revolution	25–19 W	8–2
6/28/15	Chicago Wildfire	27–26 W (OT)	9–2
7/10/15	Detroit Mechanix	42–16 W	10–2
7/11/15	@ Cincinnati Revolution	33–27 W	11–2
7/18/15	Indianapolis AlleyCats	29–25 W	12–2
2015 Midwest Playoffs Results
7/25/15	@Chicago Wildfire	24–23 W (OT)	13–2
7/25/15	@Madison Radicals	24–21 L	13–3

=== 2016–2019 ===
The Thunderbirds finished the 2016 season with a 10–4 record, second in the Midwest Division behind the Madison Radicals. In the divisional playoffs, they defeated the Minnesota Wind Chill 20–18 before falling the Radicals in the Division Finals by a score of 20–16.

The Thunderbirds qualified for their third consecutive playoff appearance with a 7–4, once again defeating the Minnesota Wind Chill in the opening round and losing to the Madison Radicals in the Division Finals.

On November 13, 2017, Thunderbirds' player Pat Hammonds was announced as the new head coach, succeeding David Hogan.

The 2018 season saw Pittsburgh post its first losing season in franchise history, finishing in 5th place in the Midwest Division with a 4–10 record.

Pittsburgh saw a significant improvement in 2019, finishing with an 8–4 record and returning to the playoffs as the second-place team in the Midwest Division.

On June 8, the AUDL hosted its first All-Star Game at Breese Stevens Field in Madison. Pittsburgh cutter Max Sheppard, the sole Thunderbirds player selected for the All-Star Game, was named the game's Most Valuable Player.

In the opening round of the 2019 playoffs, the Thunderbirds defeated the Chicago Wildfire 21–20 to advance to their fourth Midwest Finals appearance in five seasons, where they lost to the Indianapolis AlleyCats 23–17.

=== 2020s ===
Following the 2019 season, the AUDL announced a realignment of its divisions, with the Thunderbirds moving from the Midwest Division (now known as the Central Division) to the newly-formed Atlantic Division.

Due to the COVID-19 pandemic, the 2020 season was initially postponed before being officially cancelled on June 24, 2020.

The 2021 season would be the Thunderbirds' worst to date, finishing last in the Atlantic Division with a 1–11 record. Only the Detroit Mechanix (0–12) would finish the season with a worse record. After the 2021 season, the AUDL went back to its prior four-division format, and the Thunderbirds returned to the Central Division.

Prior to the start of the 2022 season, the Thunderbirds announced a partnership with the Pittsburgh Riverhounds SC of the USL Championship. The deal included a home game against the Madison Radicals to be played at Highmark Stadium, a cross-promotion between the two teams, team-specific ticket discount offers, and halftime exhibition show by the Thunderbirds at the Riverhounds' May 14 home game against El Paso Locomotive FC.

On June 22, 2024, the Thunderbirds were dealt a 26–15 defeat by the Detroit Mechanix, snapping Detroit's infamous seven-year-long, 81-game losing streak. The team finished the 2024 season 6-6, including three consecutive 1-goal losses to end the season. The following offseason saw the departure of longtime players Max Sheppard and Pete Zaccardi.

Following the 2025 season, the Thunderbirds announced that the organization and head coach Max Barowski mutually agreed to part ways. During his four-year tenure, the team amassed a record of 16-32 and failed to reach the postseason. Assistant coach David Berg would later be promoted to head coach ahead of the 2026 season.

The Thunderbirds' struggles would continue into 2026, as the team struggled to a 2-9-1 record, the tie a result of a game against the Chicago Union being cancelled due to poor air quality as a result of wildfires. Following the 2026 season, the Thunderbirds' ownership group announced that they would be selling a majority ownership stake in the team for 2027. The new ownership group consisted of several former and current Thunderbirds' players, current head coach David Berg, and several local business owners.

== Rivalries ==
=== Philadelphia Phoenix ===
The Pittsburgh Thunderbirds and Philadelphia Phoenix first met during the 2018 season, with the Phoenix winning 30–18. Although the two teams have played in different divisions for much of their history, a rivalry between them was natural due to being the only teams from the Commonwealth of Pennsylvania, as well as long-standing rivalries between the cities baseball, football, and hockey teams. The two organizations created the Commonwealth Cup trophy to be awarded to the winner of each matchup. Philadelphia currently leads the all-time series 4–2.

== Stadium ==
Prior to the start of the 2023 season, it was announced that the Thunderbirds would begin playing their home games at Highmark Stadium (now known as F.N.B. Stadium) as part of an expanded partnership between the team and Pittsburgh Riverhounds SC, the stadium's primary tenant. Previously, the Thunderbirds played their home games at Founders Field in Cheswick, and J.C. Stone Field in Pittsburgh's North Park complex.

== Record ==
Year	Division	Record	Win%	Playoffs	GF	GA	GD	Postseason
2015	Central	12-2 (2nd)	0.857	1–1	410	294	+116	Divisional Final
2016	Central	10-4 (2nd)	0.714	1-1	355	296	+59	Divisional Final
2017	Central	9-5 (3rd)	0.643	1-1	322	310	+12	Divisional Final
2018	Central	4-10 (5th)	0.286		275	332	-57	DNQ
2019	Central	8-4 (2nd)	0.667	1-1	259	227	+32	Divisional Final
2021	Atlantic	1-11 (8th)	0.083		228	289	-61	DNQ
2022	Central	4-8 (5th)	0.333		225	249	-24	DNQ
2023	Central	5-7 (4th)	0.417		236	226	+10	DNQ
2024	Central	4-8 (5th)	0.333		209	233	-24	DNQ
2025	Central	3-9 (5th)	0.250		209	272	-63	DNQ
2026	Central	2-9-1 (4th)	0.208		203	302	-99	DNQ
Total		62-77-1	0.446	4-4	2,931	3,020	-89	

== Media ==
=== Television ===
Beginning in 2025, the Thunderbirds agreed to a partnership with SportsNet Pittsburgh to broadcast all home games.

=== Broadcasters ===
The Thunderbirds' current broadcasting team consists of play-by-play announcer Matt Weiss and color commentator and former Thunderbirds' player David Vatz.
