= Ottawa Outlaws =

- Sport: Ultimate
- Founded: 2014
- Conference: Eastern
- Based in: Ottawa, Ontario
- Stadium: MNP Park (2015–2016); Millennium Park Stadium (2017); MNP Park (2018–2022)
- Owner: Jean-Lévy Champagne, Jim Lloyd, Karl Loiseau, Patrick Bazinet
- Head coach: Luke Phelan / Hagan Riglin / Laura Storey
- General manager: Karl Loiseau
- Website: ottawaoutlaws.com/

The Ottawa Outlaws were a professional ultimate franchise based in Ottawa, Ontario, Canada. They were members of the Eastern Conference of the American Ultimate Disc League (AUDL).

The Outlaws were founded in 2014 and played from 2015 to 2022.
