= Austin Sol =

Ultimate frisbee team based in Austin, Texas

- Sport: Ultimate frisbee
- Founded: 2016
- League: Ultimate Frisbee Association
- Division: South
- Based in: Austin, Texas
- Stadium: The Pitch
- Owner: Patrick Christmas
- Head coach: Steven Naji
- General manager: Patrick Christmas
- Website: www.austin-sol.com

The Austin Sol are a professional ultimate team based in Austin, Texas. The Sol compete in the Ultimate Frisbee Association (UFA) as a member of the South Division. The team was founded in 2016, and played its first match on April 2, 2016. The Sol play their home games at The Pitch. The owner and general manager of the Sol is Patrick Christmas, the head coach is Steven Naji, and the assistant general manager is Ryan Purcell.

== Seasons ==
=== 2016 ===
Date	Opponent	Result
April 2, 2016	@ Dallas Roughnecks	L 18–30
April 9, 2016	Dallas Roughnecks	L 18–29
April 16, 2016	@ Charlotte Express	L 20–21
April 17, 2016	@ Raleigh Flyers	L 27–28
April 24, 2016	Jacksonville Cannons	W 28–23
May 7, 2016	@ Dallas Roughnecks	L 16–24
May 14, 2016	@ Nashville Nightwatch	W 29–22
May 15, 2016	@ Atlanta Hustle	W 23–22 (2OT)
May 21, 2016	Nashville Nightwatch	W 37–25
June 5, 2016	Charlotte Express	W 31–14
June 18, 2016	Atlanta Hustle	L 29–31 (OT)
June 25, 2016	@ Jacksonville Cannons	W 26–24 (OT)
July 2, 2016	Dallas Roughnecks	L 22–26
July 10, 2016	Raleigh Flyers	W 33–12

=== 2017 ===
Date	Opponent	Result
April 1, 2017	@ Dallas Roughnecks	L 17–21
April 8, 2017	Raleigh Flyers	L 19–26
April 22, 2017	Dallas Roughnecks	L 24–30
April 29, 2017	@ Raleigh Flyers	L 23–28
April 30, 2017	@ Jacksonville Cannons	L 22–30
May 7, 2017	Nashville Nightwatch	W 31–11
May 20, 2017	Atlanta Hustle	L 27–28
June 3, 2017	@ Nashville Nightwatch	W 28–24
June 4, 2017	@ Atlanta Hustle	L 24–27
June 17, 2017	@ Dallas Roughnecks	L 25–27
June 25, 2017	Atlanta Hustle	W 26–25
July 1, 2017	@ Nashville Nightwatch	W 27–21
July 8, 2017	Jacksonville Cannons	L 27–31
July 15, 2017	Dallas Roughnecks	L 23–27

=== 2018 ===
Date	Opponent	Result
April 14, 2018	Los Angeles Aviators	W 23–22
April 22, 2018	@ Dallas Roughnecks	L 21–23
April 27, 2018	Raleigh Flyers	W 25–23
May 5, 2018	@ Atlanta Hustle	W 23–22
May 6, 2018	@ Nashville Nightwatch	L 20–22
May 12, 2018	Dallas Roughnecks	L 23–27
May 19, 2018	Atlanta Hustle	W 28–19
May 26, 2018	@ Nashville Nightwatch	L 21–27
June 1, 2018	@ Raleigh Flyers	L 14–32
June 2, 2018	@ Tampa Bay Cannons	W 27–26
June 9, 2018	Dallas Roughnecks	L 17–19
June 23, 2018	Nashville Nightwatch	W 24–23
June 30, 2018	@ Dallas Roughnecks	L 25–29
July 8, 2018	Tampa Bay Cannons	W 6–7*
July 27, 2018	Raleigh Flyers	L 23–26

- – after a brief rain delay, Tampa was forced to leave, forfeiting the game.

=== 2019 ===
Date	Opponent	Result
April 6, 2019	Raleigh Flyers	L 18–22
April 13, 2019	Dallas Roughnecks	W 19–17
April 20, 2019	Dallas Roughnecks	L 17–21
May 4, 2019	Atlanta Hustle	L 19–23
May 5, 2019	Raleigh Flyers	L 18–23
May 11, 2019	Dallas Roughnecks	L 21–25
May 18, 2019	Tampa Bay Cannons	L 17–19
May 25, 2019	Dallas Roughnecks	L 15-20
June 1, 2019	Tampa Bay Cannons	L 16-24
June 2, 2019	Atlanta Hustle	W 25-24
June 23, 2019	Tampa Bay Cannons	W 23-14
June 30, 2019	Atlanta Hustle	L 21–22

[7]

=== 2020 ===
The 2020 AUDL Season was cancelled due to the COVID-19 pandemic

=== 2021 ===
Date	Opponent	Result
June 12, 2021	Dallas Roughnecks	W 24-23
June 19, 2021	Los Angeles Aviators	W 22-20 (OT)
June 25, 2021	@ Seattle Cascades	L 24-28
June 26, 2021	@ San Jose Spiders	L 23-28
July 2, 2021	Seattle Cascades	W 23-16
July 9, 2021	@ Dallas Roughnecks	W 17-16
July 10, 2021	@ Dallas Roughnecks	L 20-21 (OT)
July 17, 2021	@ Los Angeles Aviators	W 21-20
July 18, 2021	@ San Diego Growlers	L 20-21
July 24, 2021	San Diego Growlers	L 17-21
July 31, 2021	San Jose Spiders	W 25-15
August 7, 2021	Dallas Roughnecks	L 22-23

=== 2022 ===
Date	Opponent	Result
April 30, 2022	@ Dallas Legion	W 20-17
May 13, 2022	Dallas Legion	W 24-17
May 20, 2022	@ Carolina Flyers	L 24-27
May 21, 2022	@ Atlanta Hustle	L 21-26
June 4, 2022	Carolina Flyers	W 21-20
June 17, 2022	@ Chicago Union	L 21-24
June 18, 2022	@ Madison Radicals	W 19-18
June 25, 2022	Dallas Legion	W 26-20
July 2, 2022	@ Dallas Legion	W 26-16
July 9, 2022	Atlanta Hustle	W 18-17
July 16, 2022	Dallas Legion	W 26-22
July 29, 2022	Tampa Bay Cannons	W 30-10
August 20, 2022	@ Carolina Flyers	L 20-22

== Roster ==
2022 Roster		
Max Grove	Mark Evans	Ryan Purcell
Reese Bowman	Evan Swiatek	Eric Brodbeck
Jake Reinhardt	Jacob Sames	Saaketh Palchuru
Vinay Valsaraj	Noah Chambers	Mark Henke
Reid Bacon	Ethan Pollack	Nick Loughran
Elliott Moore	Trevor Elam	Kyle Henke
Eric Carter	Sebastien Lauzy	Mick Walter
Jackson Potts	Aaron Barcio	Alex Heath
Paul Starkel	Jake Radack	Zach Slayton
Matt Chambers	Oliver Fay	Joey Wylie
Matthew Armour	John Clyde	Chris Casella
Gavin Babbitt	Chris Layden	Kolbe Bauer
Jake Worthington	Noah Powell	Oliver Feder
Owen Smith	Thomas Maguire	Robert Lewis
Robert Hausmann		
