= Tampa Bay Cannons =

Ultimate disc team in United States

- Sport: Ultimate
- Founded: 2015 (as Jacksonville Cannons)
- Division: South
- Based in: St. Petersburg, Florida
- Stadium: Gibbs High School
- Colors: Yellow and black
- Head coach: Mike Taylor
- Overall record: 35-45 (regular season); 0-2 (playoffs)
- Website: theaudl.com/cannons

The Tampa Bay Cannons (formerly the Jacksonville Cannons) were a professional ultimate team in the South Division of the American Ultimate Disc League (AUDL) based in St. Petersburg, Florida. The Cannons were active from 2015 to 2022.

== History ==
Bill Kilgannon purchased American Ultimate Disc League franchise rights for Jacksonville, Florida in 2012; the team, called the Cannons, debuted in the 2015 season and made the playoffs in its inaugural season. The team drew from many former college during its inaugural season, including those from the University of Florida, Florida State University, and the University of Central Florida. After the team's 2017 season, ownership decided to relocate to Tampa, citing better community interest for games. It was later revealed that Kilgannon had sold the team to the AUDL, and that the league planned the move to Orlando. However, a group of owners from Tampa Bay made the purchase in time for the 2018 season and moved the team to Tampa. The Cannons also rolled out a redesigned logo coinciding with the move to Tampa. After playing two years in Tampa, the team expressed interest in moving to St. Petersburg, Florida for the 2020 season, citing more community support than Tampa. The team was realigned to the short-lived Atlantic Division for the 2021 season, which became the South Division again in 2022. The Cannons ceased operations after the 2022 season.
