= Polito =

Polito is an Italian surname that may refer to:

== People ==
- Ciro Polito (born 1979), Italian footballer
- Clemente Polito (17th century), Roman Catholic prelate
- Enzo Polito (1926–2004), Italian water polo player
- Gene Polito (1918–2010), American cinematographer
- Joachim Polito (1941), American animator
- John Polito (1950–2016), American actor
- Juan Polito (1908–1981), Argentine pianist and orchestra conductor
- Karyn Polito (born 1966), American politician and lawyer
- Lina Polito (born 1954), Italian actress
- Piero Polito (1925–2010), Italian poet and literary critic
- Robert Polito (born 1951), American academic, critic and poet
- Sergio Aponte Polito (born in 1940), Mexican Army General
- Sol Polito (1892–1960), Italian-American cinematographer
- Steven Polito (born 1968), American comedian and singer
- Stephen Polito (1760–1814), Italian menagerie owner

== Other uses ==
- Polytechnic University of Turin (Politecnico di Torino), a technical university in Turin, Italy
