= 2016 Major League Ultimate season =

2016 MLU season
- League: Major League Ultimate
- Sport: Ultimate
- Duration: April 9 – July 16, 2016
- Number of matches: 43
- Number of teams: 8
- TV partner(s): YouTube, CSN

Regular season
- Season MVP: Billy Sickles (Eastern conference - Philadelphia); Cody Bjorklund (Western conference - Portland)
- Top scorer: Cody Bjorklund (57)

Playoffs
- Eastern champions: Philadelphia Spinners
- Eastern runners-up: Boston Whitecaps
- Western champions: Portland Stags
- Western runners-up: Seattle Rainmakers

MLU Championship
- Champions: Philadelphia Spinners
- Runners-up: Portland Stags
- Finals MVP: Charlie McCutcheon (Philadelphia)

MLU seasons
- ← 2015

The 2016 Major League Ultimate season was the fourth and final season for the frisbee league. The eight teams were split into two regional conferences (East and West), with each team playing a 10-game schedule, including some cross-divisional matches. The top two teams in each conference advanced to the next round, where they competed against the other qualified team from their conference. The winners of these matches advanced to the final to compete for the MLU Championship. On July 16, Philadelphia Spinners won the final 14–11 against Portland Stags to become the 2016 MLU Champions.

== Standings ==
Eastern Conference

Pos	Team	Pld	W	L	PF	PA	PD	PCT	Qualification
1	q – Philadelphia Spinners	10	9	1	217	161	+56	.900	Conference Final (Home)
2	q – Boston Whitecaps	10	8	2	193	159	+34	.800 (Note: The DC Current @ Boston Whitecaps match on June 11 was cancelled due to transport issues, with both teams awarded the win.)	Conference Final (Away)
3	DC Current	10	3	7	156	177	−21	.300	
4	New York Rumble	10	2	8	157	222	−65	.200	

q – Qualified for the phase indicated
Notes:

Western Conference

Pos	Team	Pld	W	L	PF	PA	PD	PCT	Qualification
1	q – Portland Stags	10	9	1	228	149	+79	.900	Conference Final (Home)
2	q – Seattle Rainmakers	10	7	3	207	167	+40	.700	Conference Final (Away)
3	San Francisco Dogfish	10	2	8	166	205	−39	.200	
4	Vancouver Nighthawks	10	1	9	143	227	−84	.100	

q – Qualified for the phase indicated

== Postseason ==
Conference Finals
E1	Philadelphia Spinners	20
E2	Boston Whitecaps	16
W1	Portland Stags	18
W2	Seattle Rainmakers	9

MLU Championship
Philadelphia Spinners	14
Portland Stags	11

=== Conference Finals ===
June 25, 2016
19:00 PT
Eastern Conference

Seattle Rainmakers	9–18	Portland Stags
(1–5, 4–5, 1–4, 3–4)
2 goals Dylan Harrington	Boxscore	3 goals Topher Davis
2 assists Evan Klein; Henry Phan		3 assists Benjamin McGinn; Tad Jensen; Raphael Hayes

Milwaukie High School Turf Field, Milwaukie
Players of the game:
SEA: Dylan Harrington (2 goals, 2 blocks)
POR: Benjamin McGinn (2 goals, 3 assists)

June 26, 2016
15:00 ET
Western Conference

Boston Whitecaps	16–20	Philadelphia Spinners
(4–7, 6–4, 5–3, 1–6)
3 goals Jason Clark; Tannor Johnson	Boxscore	2 goals David Brandolph; Matt Glazer; Jack Casey; Billy Sickles
3 assists Adrian Banerji; Tyler Chan		2 assists David Brandolph; Matthew Esser; Nick Hirannet; Michael Panna; Ethan Peck; Nick Patel

Carey Stadium, Fort Washington
Players of the game:
BOS: Jason Clark (3 goals, 2 assists, 1 block)
PHL: Greg Martin (1 goal, 4 blocks)

=== MLU Championship ===
August 16, 2016
18:30 ET
Final

Philadelphia Spinners	14–11	Portland Stags
(3–5, 4–1, 5–2, 2–3)
2 goals David Brandolph; Jack Casey; Charles McCutcheon	Boxscore	2 goals Trevor Smith
2 assists Gabe Colton; Matthew Esser; David Baer		2 assists Raphael Hayes; Tad Jensen; Benjamin McGinn

Franklin Field at the University of Pennsylvania, Philadelphia
Referees:
Steve Kreider (Washington D.C.) — Head referee
Morgan Wescliff (Seattle)
James Kulinski (Philadelphia)
James Rhodes (Boston)
Alan Baggish (Vancouver)
Noah Polsky (New York) — Scoreboard official
Players of the game:
PHL: Charles McCutcheon (2 goals, 2 blocks)
POR: Tad Jensen (1 goal, 2 assists, 1 block)

== Season Awards ==
=== Most Valuable Players ===
Billy Sickles and Cody Bjorklund were voted for as the MVPs for their respective conferences.

Eastern Conference

Rank	Player	Team
1	Billy Sickles	Philadelphia Spinners
2	Delrico Johnson	DC Current
3	Marques Brownlee	New York Rumble
4	Matt Glazer	Philadelphia Spinners
5	Piers MacNaughton	Boston Whitecaps

Western Conference

Rank	Player	Team
1	Cody Bjorklund	Portland Stags
2	Raphy Hayes	Portland Stags
3	Brad Houser	Seattle Rainmakers
3	Timmy Perston	Portland Stags
3	Peter Woodside	Portland Stags

=== Spirit Awards ===
Quinn Hunziker (New York Rumble) and Clay Dewey-Valentine (Seattle Rainmakers) were voted for by the other players as the most spirited within their conferences. This award was given based on their sportsmanship both on and off the pitch.

=== Rookies of the Year ===
This award was given for the players who had the best season as a first-year player. Graeme Barber (Vancouver Nighthawks) and Sean Mott (New York Rumble) won the award for their respective conference.

Eastern Conference

Rank	Player	Team
1	Sean Mott	New York Rumble
2	Greg Martin	Philadelphia Spinners
3	Kyle Khalifa	DC Current
4	Tanner Halkyard	Boston Whitecaps
5	Ethan Peck	Philadelphia Spinners

Western Conference

Rank	Player	Team
1	Graeme Barber	Vancouver Nighthawks
2	Dylan Harrington	Seattle Rainmakers
3	Daniel Naruo	San Francisco Dogfish
4	Devon Williams	San Francisco Dogfish
5	Trevor Smith	Portland Stags

=== Breakout Player of the Year ===
This award was awarded to Raphy Hayes (Portland Stags) as the player who made the most improvement compared to the previous season.

Rank	Player	Team
1	Raphy Hayes	Portland Stags
2	Himalaya Mehta	Philadelphia Spinners
3	Brad Houser	Seattle Rainmakers
4	Lloyd Blake	DC Current
5	Taylor Cascino	San Francisco Dogfish
5	Erik Hunter	Vancouver Nighthawks

=== Offensive Players of the Year ===
This award was given to the best offensive player in each conference. Brad Houser (Seattle Rainmakers) and Delrico Johnson (DC Current) were the two winners of the award.

Eastern Conference

Rank	Player	Team
1	Delrico Johnson	DC Current
2	Billy Sickles	Philadelphia Spinners
3	Lloyd Blake	DC Current
4	Matt Glazer	Philadelphia Spinners
5	Sean Mott	New York Rumble

Western Conference

Rank	Player	Team
1	Brad Houser	Seattle Rainmakers
2	Cody Bjorklund	Portland Stags
3	Timmy Perston	Portland Stags
4	Gabe Saunkeah	San Francisco Dogfish
5	Raphy Hayes	Portland Stags

=== Defensive Players of the Year ===
This award was given to the best defensive player in each conference. Marques Brownlee (New York Rumble) and Peter Woodside (Portland Stags) were the two winners of the award.

Eastern Conference

Rank	Player	Team
1	Marques Brownlee	New York Rumble
2	Christian Foster	Boston Whitecaps
3	Charlie McCutcheon	Philadelphia Spinners
4	Matt Esser	Philadelphia Spinners
5	Greg Martin	Philadelphia Spinners

Western Conference

Rank	Player	Team
1	Peter Woodside	Portland Stags
2	Evan Klein	Seattle Rainmakers
3	Cam Bailey	Seattle Rainmakers
4	Topher Davis	Portland Stags
5	Riley Meinershagen	Portland Stags

=== Coaches of the Year ===
This award was given to the coach in each conference who surpassed their goals throughout the season. It was awarded to Danny Quarrell (Portland Stags) and Darryl Stanley (Philadelphia Spinners) who both took their teams to the final of the competition, losing only one conference match each.

== See also ==
- 2016 American Ultimate Disc League season
