= 2013 Major League Ultimate season =

2013 MLU season
- League: Major League Ultimate
- Sport: Ultimate Frisbee
- Duration: April 20 - July 13, 2013

Regular season
- Season champions: Boston Whitecaps
- Season MVP: Chris Mazur (Eastern conference - New York); Adam Simon (Western conference - Seattle)
- Top scorer: Josh Markette (62)

Playoffs
- Eastern champions: Boston Whitecaps
- Eastern runners-up: Washington DC Current
- Western champions: San Francisco Dogfish
- Western runners-up: Seattle Rainmakers

MLU Championship
- Champions: Boston Whitecaps
- Runners-up: San Francisco Dogfish
- Finals MVP: Jeff Graham (Boston)

MLU seasons
- 2014

The 2013 Major League Ultimate season was the inaugural season for the league. The season began on April 20, 2013 and concluded on July 13, 2013 with the Championship between the Boston Whitecaps and the San Francisco Dogfish. Each team played a 10-game schedule. This season had the first and only team, to date, to go completely undefeated as the Boston Whitecaps went 12-0, including playoffs.

The official uniform manufacturer was Five Ultimate.

== Standings ==
Q indicates a team qualified for the playoffs. H indicates home field advantage in the conference finals.

Eastern Conference
Team	GP	W	L	PCT	PF	PA	PD
H-Boston Whitecaps	10	10	0	1.00	219	160	+59
Q-Washington DC Current	10	4	6	.400	176	187	-11
New York Rumble	10	3	7	.300	172	188	-16
Philadelphia Spinners	10	3	7	.300	164	196	-32

Western Conference
Team	GP	W	L	PCT	PF	PA	PD
H-San Francisco Dogfish	10	8	2	.800	204	164	+40
Q-Seattle Rainmakers	10	8	2	.800	188	155	+30
Vancouver Nighthawks	10	3	7	.300	175	191	-16
Portland Stags	10	1	9	.100	151	208	-75

== Playoffs ==
Conference Championship
E1	Boston Whitecaps	23
E2	DC Current	15
W1	San Francisco Dogfish	18
W2	Seattle Rainmakers	17

Championship
E	Boston Whitecaps	20
W	San Francisco Dogfish	15

== Top scorers ==
Rank	Scorer	Team	G+A	G	A	THR	CMP	CAT
1	Christopher Mazur	New York Rumble	57	24	33	412	365	357
2	Josh Markette	Boston Whitecaps	50	18	32	177	169	187
3	Peter Prial	Boston Whitecaps	48	30	18	129	118	158
4	Mark Burton	Seattle Rainmakers	47	29	18	117	105	145
5	Ben Faust	New York Rumble	46	17	29	177	152	192

== Most Valuable Players ==
Award	Name	Team
Eastern Conference	Chris Mazur	New York Rumble
Western Conference	Adam Simon	Seattle Rainmakers
Championship	Jeff Graham	Boston Whitecaps
