= Major League Ultimate =

Defunct ultimate frisbee league

- Sport: Ultimate
- Founded: 2012
- First season: 2013
- Folded: 2016
- No. of teams: 8
- Country: United States (7 teams); Canada (1 team)
- Most titles: Boston Whitecaps (2)
- Website: MLUltimate.com

Major League Ultimate (MLU) was a North American semi-professional ultimate league from 2013 to 2016. It was composed of eight member teams, seven in the United States and one in Canada. It was formed in 2012, and began its inaugural season in April 2013.

== History ==
The Philadelphia Spinners left the American Ultimate Disc League at the end of the 2012 season after disagreements on how it was run. With the help of their staff, including former GM Jeff Snader, and a core group of individuals now referred to as the Founders, the MLU was created in 2012. On December 21, 2016, the league announced that its investors had pulled funding and that league operations would be suspended indefinitely.

== Rules ==
The MLU used most of the standard rules of Ultimate, with multiple adaptations. Most of the adaptations were like those of the American Ultimate Disc League. Games were played on slightly expanded fields, and double-teaming of an offensive player was allowed. Also unusual for Ultimate, although common in other sports and the AUDL, the MLU used referees to make the calls. With time, more changes to the rules were applied by the MLU.

While most Ultimate games use the Ultrastar disc, the MLU used a slightly different disc, the Innova Pulsar, whose design made it stay in the air longer, leading to more hucks, deep games, and skys.

Although not an on-field rule, an early rule of the league was that all players would be compensated equally, at $25 a game. This eventually led some, like Beau Kittredge, to leave the league.

== Competition format ==
The eight teams in the MLU were split into two conferences (East and West). During the regular season, each team played 10 matches (sometimes including cross-divisional matches). The top two teams from each division advanced to a conference final. The winners from these matches then advanced to compete in the MLU Championship match.

== Media coverage ==
Highlights of the 2013 championship game were broadcast on Fox Sports 1 as part of an anthology show co-hosted by former NFL player Dhani Jones and Olympic gold medalist Jonny Moseley. ESPN's SportsCenter Top 10 and SportsNation have also featured highlight clips from the MLU, bringing national attention to the league.

In 2016, all games were livestreamed on YouTube and through the MLU website.

== Sponsorship ==
In 2013, Five Ultimate was the official uniform manufacturer for all eight teams.

For the 2014 season, Puma became the official jersey sponsor.

For 2015 and 2016, Canterbury was the official jersey sponsor.

== Teams ==
Teams	City/Area	Stadium	Founded	Head Coach(es)
Eastern Conference
Boston Whitecaps	Medford, MA	Hormel Stadium	2012	Sam Rosenthal
DC Current	Washington, DC	Cardinal Stadium	2013	Keven Moldenhauer and Will Smolinski
New York Rumble	Orange, NJ	Bell Stadium	2013	Anthony Nuñez and Eileen Murray
Philadelphia Spinners	Fort Washington, PA	Carey Stadium	2012	Darryl Stanley
Western Conference
Portland Stags	Milwaukie, OR	Milwaukie High School	2013	Danny Quarrell
San Francisco Dogfish	Berkeley, CA	Yellowjacket Stadium	2013	Jason Seidler
Seattle Rainmakers	Renton, WA	Renton Memorial Stadium	2013	Kate Kingery and Fiona McKibben
Vancouver Nighthawks	Vancouver, BC	Thunderbird Stadium	2013	Patrick Gatien

== Championships ==
Season	Date	Champion	Score	Runner-up	Venue	Location	MVP	Ref
2013	July 13, 2013	Boston Whitecaps	20–15	San Francisco Dogfish	Franklin Field	Philadelphia, PA	Jeff Graham (Boston Whitecaps)	
2014	July 19, 2014	DC Current	23–17	Vancouver Nighthawks	PPL Park	Chester, PA	Markham Shofner (DC Current)	
2015	August 8, 2015	Boston Whitecaps	31–17	Seattle Rainmakers	PPL Park	Chester, PA	Jeff Graham (Boston Whitecaps)	
2016	July 16, 2016	Philadelphia Spinners	14–11	Portland Stags	Franklin Field	Philadelphia, PA	Charlie McCutcheon (Philadelphia Spinners)	

== See also ==
- Ultimate Frisbee Association (formerly known as AUDL)
