= Franklin Field =

Sports stadium in Philadelphia, Pennsylvania, US

Coordinates: 39°57′N 75°11.4′W

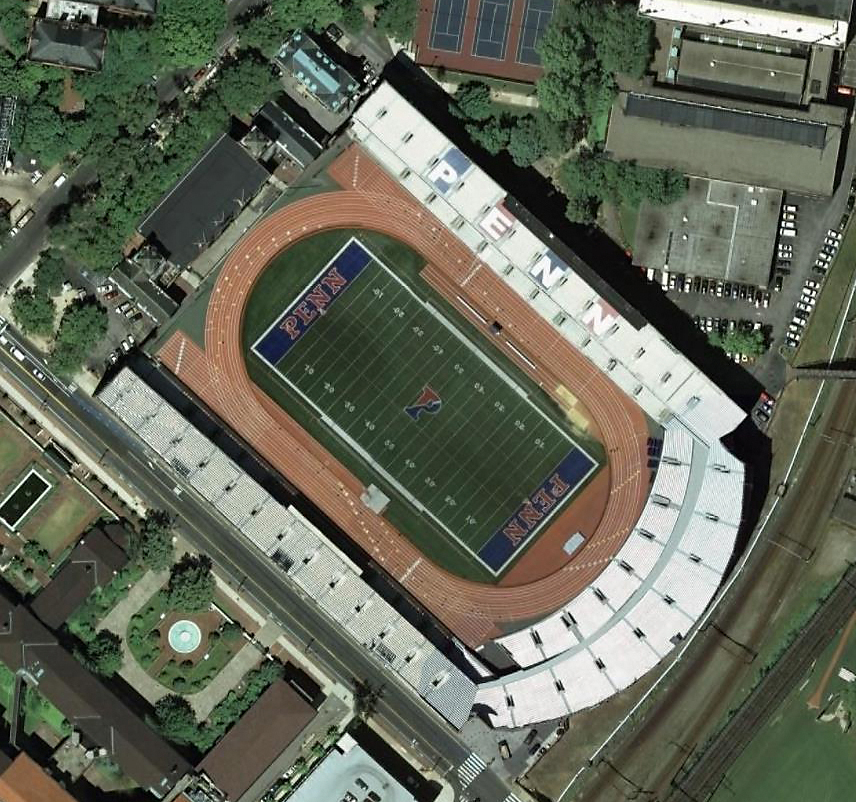
- An aerial view of Franklin Field in November 2008

- Location in the United States Location in Pennsylvania
- Interactive map of Franklin Field
- Address: South 33rd and Spruce Streets
- Location: University of Pennsylvania; Philadelphia, Pennsylvania
- Owner: University of Pennsylvania
- Capacity: 52,958 (2003–present) Former capacity: List: 30,000 (1895–1922); 50,000 (1922–1925); 78,000 (1925–1958); 60,658 (1958–1970); 60,546 (1970–1989); 52,593 (1989–2002)
- Surface: Field; Natural grass (1895–1968); AstroTurf (1969–2003); Sprinturf (2004–present); Track; Cinder (1895–1987); Rekortan (1988–present)
- Public transit: Penn Medicine Station; SEPTA bus: 30, 40, 42, 49, LUCY

Construction
- Groundbreaking: 1895
- Opened: April 20, 1895; 131 years ago
- Renovated: 1903; 1922
- Cost: $100,000 (1895) ($3.87 million in 2025) $525,000 (1903) ($18.8 million in 2025)
- Architects: Frank Miles Day & Brother; Charles Klauder
- General contractors: Turner Construction (permanent structure in 1922)

Tenants
- Penn Quakers (NCAA) (1895–present); Philadelphia Eagles (NFL) (1958–1970); Philadelphia Bell (WFL) (1975); Philadelphia Atoms (NASL) (1976); Philadelphia Spinners (MLU) (2012–2014); Philadelphia Fury (NISA) (2019)

Website
- upenn.edu/franklin-field

Franklin Field is a sports stadium in Philadelphia, Pennsylvania, at the eastern edge of the University of Pennsylvania's campus. Named after Penn's founder, Benjamin Franklin, it is the home stadium for the Penn Relays, and the university's venue for football, track and field, and lacrosse. Franklin is also used by Penn students for recreation, intramural and club sports, including touch football and cricket; it is also the site of Penn's commencement exercises, weather permitting.

Franklin Field is the oldest still operating college football site in the nation. (Note: Harvard Stadium, opened in 1903, is recognized as the oldest original stadium structure still in use for college football. While Franklin Field (1895) is the oldest site in continuous use, its current stadium structure dates from a 1922 reconstruction. Harvard Stadium, in contrast, retains its original reinforced-concrete structure, making it the oldest actual stadium building still hosting college football games.) Franklin Field was the first college stadium in the United States with a scoreboard and the second with an upper deck of seats. In 1922, it was the site of the first radio broadcast of a football game on WIP, as well as of the first television broadcast of a football game by Philco.

From 1958 through 1970, Franklin Field was the home of the Philadelphia Eagles of the National Football League (NFL). It hosted the NFL Championship Game in December 1960, as the Eagles defeated the Green Bay Packers by four points.

== History ==
=== 19th century ===
Until around 1860, the grounds of what became Franklin Field served as a potter's field. The crania of some of these individuals were acquired by Samuel Morton and are now housed in the Penn Museum.

Franklin Field was built for US$100,000 (equivalent to $3,870,000 in 2025) and dedicated on April 20, 1895, for the first running of the Penn Relays. The Field supplemented and eventually replaced the venue called University Athletic Grounds, which was located a few blocks west on a block bounded by Spruce Street (north), 36th Street (east), Pine Street (south), Woodland Avenue and 37th Street T-intersection (northwest). Its location was typically given as "37th and Spruce".

=== 20th century ===
Permanent Franklin Field construction did not begin until after the turn of the century. Weightman Hall gymnasium, the stadium, and permanent grandstands were designed by architect Frank Miles Day & Brother and were erected from 1903 to 1905. The reconstructed and expanded Franklin Field was opened on September 26, 1903 prior to Penn football's first game of the season when they hosted Dickinson. Invitations were sent to 2,000 individuals including the governor of Pennsylvania, the members of the state legislature, and city officials including the mayor, council, judges, and heads of municipal departments. Penn officials gathered at Houston Hall and paraded to Franklin Field where the provost raised the red and blue flag above the field. The reconstructed stadium seated 25,000, and was opened as the gymnasium was being constructed at the western end. The Philadelphia Inquirer reported that costs totaled US$525,000 (equivalent to $18,812,500 in 2025) and were raised entirely from alumni and undergraduates.

The field was 714 feet (218 m) long and 443 feet (135 m) wide. The site featured a ¼-mile track, a football field, and a baseball diamond. Beneath the stands were indoor tracks and indoor training facilities.

In 1916, university officials, led by George Neitzche, planned with the city to build a new 100,000-seat half-sunken stadium for $750,000 at Woodland Ravine, a depression on the southeastern side of Woodland Cemetery. Plans called for a new train station called Union Station which would feature a Pennsylvania Railroad stop and a stop on a proposed (and never built) elevated subway line connected to the Market–Frankford Line. Architecture firm Koronski & Cameron created a rendering but plans quickly collapsed. Five years later, it was decided instead to expand Franklin Field.

==== 1922 rebuilding ====
Workmen laying bricks on the south wall of Franklin Field, c. 1922

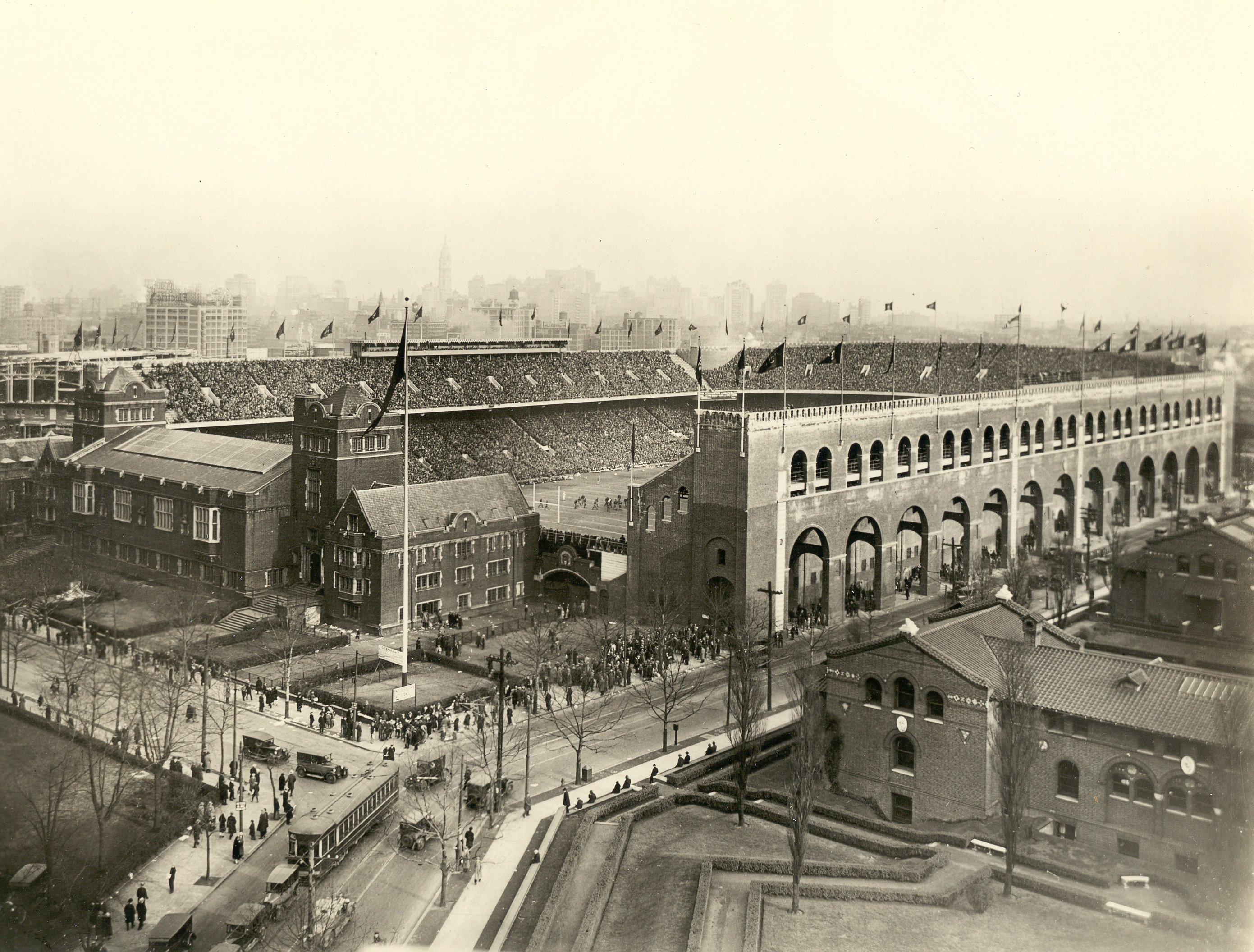
Franklin Field during a 1925 Penn football game

The current stadium structure was built in the 1920s, designed by Day & Klauder, after the original wooden bleachers were torn down. The lower tier was erected in 1922. The old wood stands were razed immediately following the Penn Relays and the new concrete lower tier and seating for 50,000 were built. The second tier was added in 1925, again designed by Day & Klauder, when it became the second and the largest two-tiered stadium in the United States.

The stadium was designed of steel and concrete in the shape of a letter "U". Initial cost was estimated around $725,000. At the time of its construction, it was noted that Franklin Field was one of the few large fields which was built to support baseball as well as football and track sports. Most other large stadia were meant only for football and track.

The first football radio broadcast originated from Franklin Field in 1922, carried by Philadelphia station WIP. This claim is pre-empted by an earlier live radio broadcast emanating from Forbes Field in Pittsburgh, on October 8, 1921, a full year before Franklin Field's claim to fame. Harold W. Arlin announced the live broadcast of the Pitt-West Virginia football game on October 8, 1921, on radio station KDKA. The first commercial football television broadcast in 1939 also came from Franklin Field.

The 1936 Democratic National Convention was concluded at Franklin Field, where President Franklin D. Roosevelt delivered his acceptance speech after being renominated for a second term.

In the 1930s and 1940s, Penn led the nation in attendance. The 65,000-seat stadium was expanded each fall with temporary stands to seat 78,000.

The annual Thanksgiving Cornell–Penn game, broadcast on national radio, attracted a reported 70,000 to the stadium in 1931. The game earned a story on the front page of The Philadelphia Inquirer along with a quarter-by-quarter breakdown of every detail of the game. The 1947 game attracted a crowd estimated in contemporary reports at "about 80,000".

By the start of the 21st Century, Franklin Field seated 52,958.

Franklin Field switched from natural grass to AstroTurf in 1969 and became first NFL stadium with artificial turf. (The Houston Oilers of the AFL had moved into the Astrodome (with AstroTurf) the previous season.) The stadium's fifth AstroTurf surface was installed in 1993, and the current Sprinturf field replaced it in 2004. Tenants since 1958, the Eagles moved to Veterans Stadium in 1971, also with artificial turf.

Franklin Field was considered a candidate to host games for the 1994 World Cup. FIFA required that host stadiums have natural grass. Had Philadelphia been selected and Franklin Field used, the stadium would have had to return to a grass surface, or perhaps use a temporary grass field as was done at two World Cup sites—Giants Stadium in East Rutherford, New Jersey, and the Pontiac Silverdome in Pontiac, Michigan.

=== 21st century ===
After 125 years, the original 1895 concrete stands were deteriorating badly. An extensive $44 million renovation to reinforce the concrete began in 2015. The project was staggered over multiple phases, which allowed the continued use of the stadium during renovation work. Previous coatings were removed, the failing sections were replaced, and rebar throughout the structure was reinforced. The project was completed by September 2023 and received a historic preservation award.

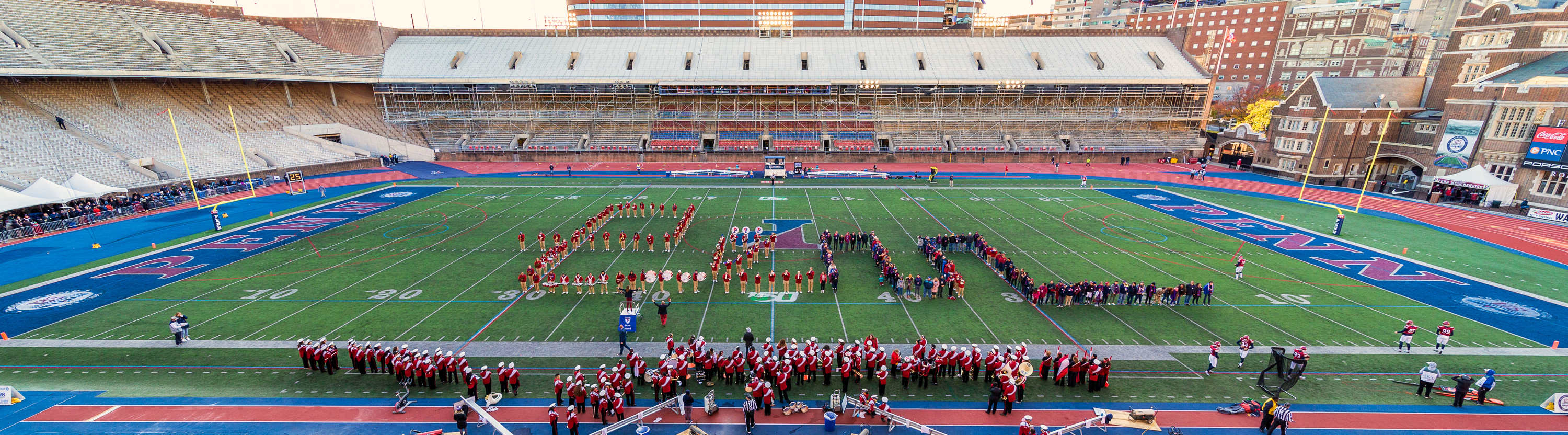
The University of Pennsylvania Band and alumni spell "Penn" on Franklin Field during the Homecoming game in November 2019. Note the south and east stands are empty while undergoing renovation.

== Athletics ==
=== Football ===
==== Penn Quakers ====
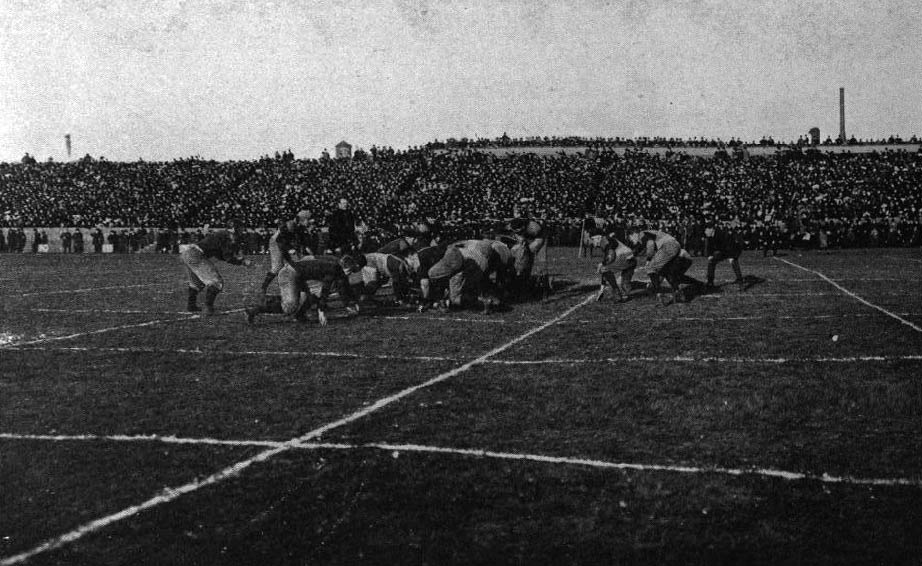
Penn hosts Harvard at Franklin Field (undated, from a 1905 book)

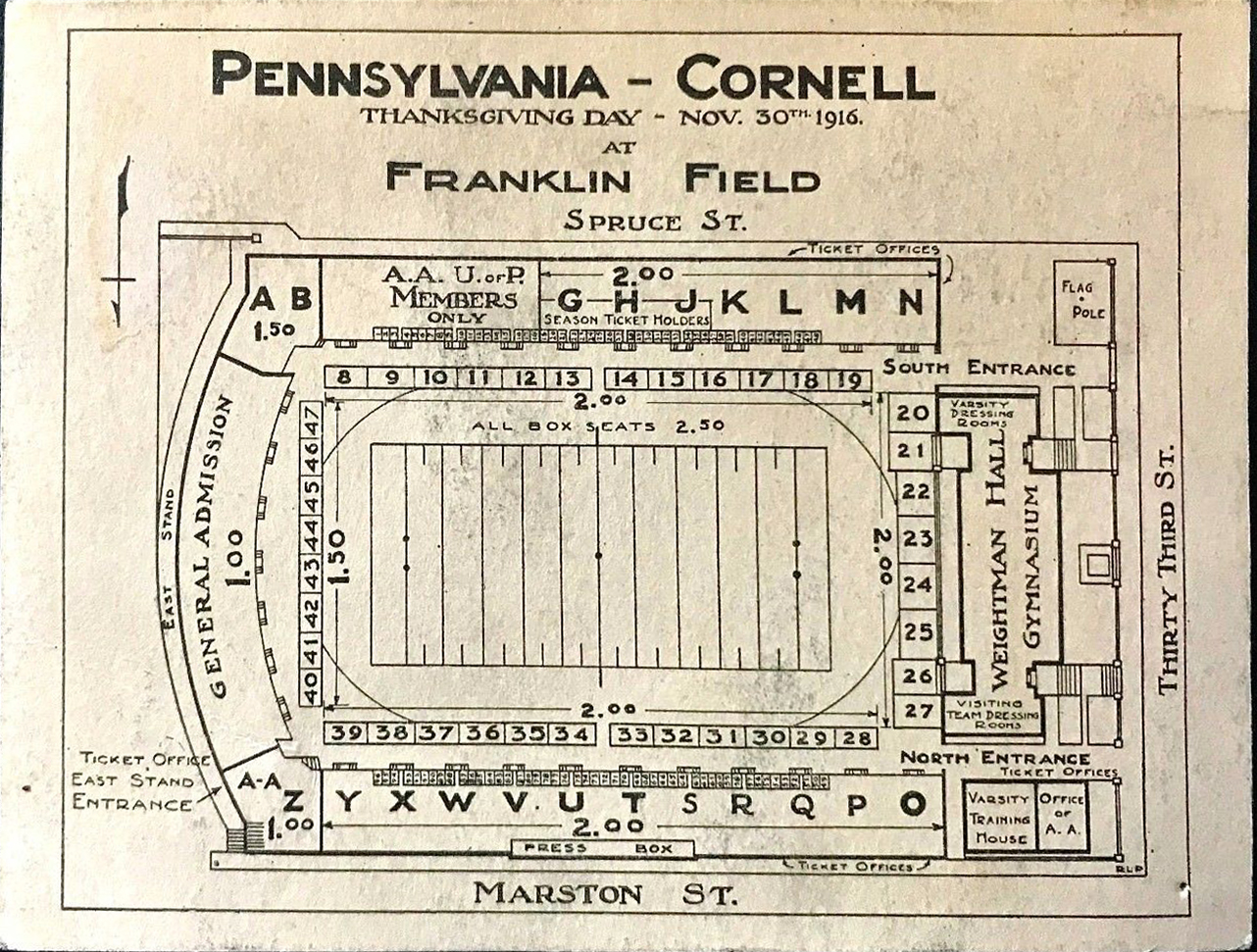
The 1916 seating map at Franklin Field for the annual Thanksgiving game between Penn and Cornell

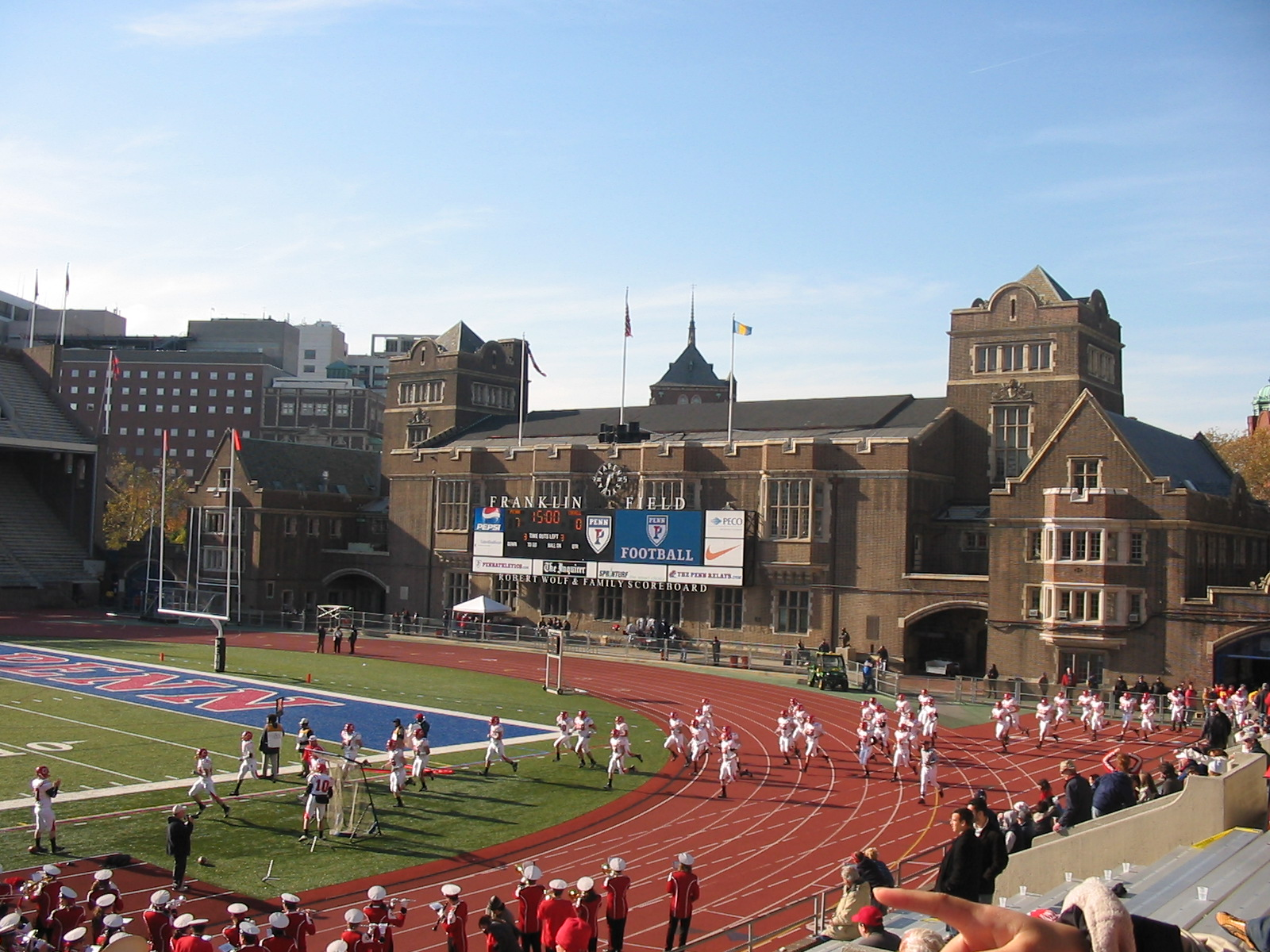
The stadium's fieldhouse at the west end of the field during a Penn–Cornell football game in November 2005

Penn football played on Franklin Field for the first time in 1895. The University of Pennsylvania was one of the top football schools in the first years of college football. Many consider Penn to have been the national champion in college football in 1894, 1895, 1897 and 1904. Other sources identify Penn as national champions in 1895, 1897, 1904 and 1908.

John H. Outland played at Franklin Field for Penn in 1897 and 1898. On October 26, 1907, Jim Thorpe and the Carlisle Indian school trounced a powerful University of Pennsylvania team, 26–6, before an overflow crowd of 20,000 at Franklin Field.

On October 26, 1918, with the Spanish flu sweeping through the city, the Penn football team played the Navy Yard's Marines football club at an empty Franklin Field with the stadium closed to fans to prevent the spread of the virus.

Red Grange set an NCAA record at Franklin Field when he rushed for 331 yards in the University of Illinois' 24–2 victory over Penn on October 31, 1925, before 67,877 spectators.

On Saturday, November 16, 2002, ESPN broadcast College GameDay from Franklin Field prior to the game between Penn and Harvard. Both teams entered the game undefeated, 5–0, in the conference. It was College GameDay's first broadcast from a Division I-AA college. Penn won the contest, 44–9, and was undefeated and untied for the season. Harvard finished 6–1 in conference, 7–3 overall.

The Penn Quakers football team played their 800th game ever at the stadium on October 4, 2008, against Dartmouth.

=== Philadelphia Eagles ===
The Philadelphia Eagles played at Franklin Field from 1958 through 1970. They moved to the stadium for the 1958 season after leaving Connie Mack Stadium: Franklin Field would seat over 60,000 for the Eagles whereas Connie Mack had a capacity of 39,000. According to then-Eagles president Frank L. McNamee, the Eagles did not pay rent for use of Franklin Field because Penn was a not-for-profit organization. Instead, the Eagles donated between $75,000 and $100,000 per-year to pay for maintenance and other expenses. The university collected all concessions and parking revenue.

On October 11, 1959, NFL Commissioner Bert Bell died at the nearby university hospital after suffering a heart attack at Franklin Field during the last two minutes of the game between the Eagles and Pittsburgh Steelers.

The Eagles hosted the 1960 NFL Championship Game here on December 26, defeating the favored Green Bay Packers 17–13 in head coach Vince Lombardi's only career playoff loss. Two years earlier, the two franchises had finished second last and last in the twelve-team league: the attendance for the title game was 67,325. As the venue did not have lights at the time, the game started at noon to allow overtime to be played if required.

Two infamous incidents in Eagles history occurred at the stadium.

==== Santa Claus booed ====
During the 1968 season finale against the Minnesota Vikings on December 15, a Christmas show was planned for halftime. The struggling Eagles entered the game at 2–11, and fans were less than pleased with Eagles quarterback Norm Snead (injured in preseason), owner Jerry Wolman, and especially coach Joe Kuharich: many fans came to the game wearing "Joe Must Go" buttons. Unfortunately, the man meant to play Santa was unable to make it to Franklin Field due to the bad weather.

In lieu of the original halftime show, a 19-year-old fan named Frank Olivo (who came to the stadium already wearing a Santa Claus costume) was invited onto the field to toss candy canes with the cheerleaders. Frustrated by the team, the ugly wet weather, and his unconvincing beard, fans booed Olivo and threw snowballs at him. This incident is often referred to by sportscasters in denigrating Philadelphia sports fans as being so mean they booed Santa Claus. The Eagles lost the game, 24–17. Olivo continued to attend Eagles games and even made a return as Santa Claus four decades later, at the Eagles' December 27, 2009, game against the Denver Broncos at Lincoln Financial Field. This time, Olivo was not targeted by snowballs. Frank Olivo died in 2015 at age 66.

==== Howard Cosell taken ill ====
In the first season of Monday Night Football in 1970, announcer Howard Cosell was apparently drunk during the Eagles-New York Giants game on November 23. After throwing up on color commentator Don Meredith's cowboy boots shortly before halftime, Cosell left the stadium and took a taxi back to New York City. Meredith and play-by-play announcer Keith Jackson made little mention of his departure during the second half.

Later, denying drunkenness, Cosell said that he had been dizzy from running laps around Franklin Field's track before the game with track star Tommie Smith. Cosell was 52 years old at the time.

=== Other college football ===
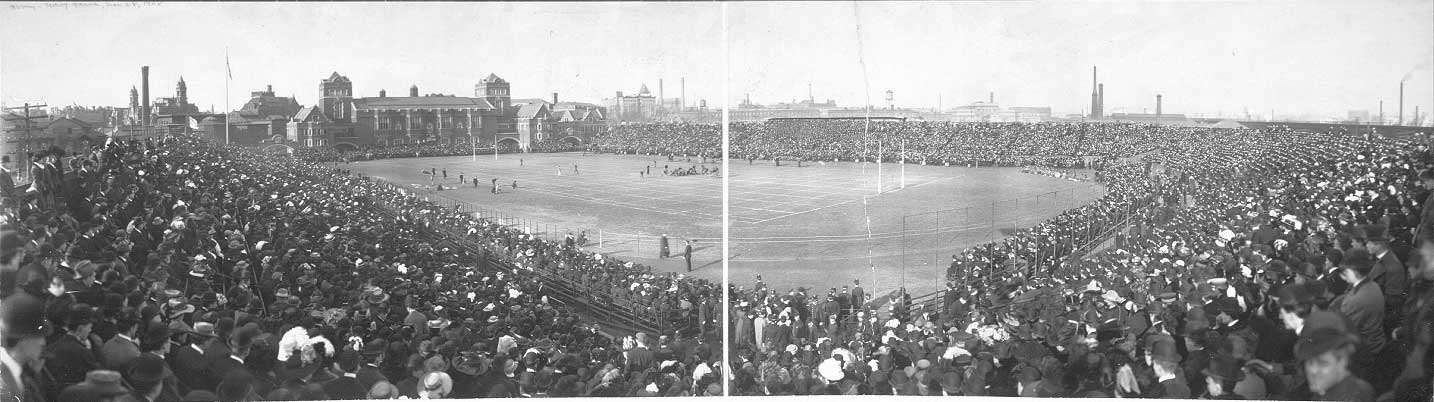
The 1908 Army–Navy Game at Franklin Field

The Army–Navy Game was played 18 times at Franklin Field between 1899 and 1935 before moving to the larger Municipal Stadium in South Philadelphia in 1936.The Army and Navy football teams had faced each other on each others campuses four times between 1890 and 1893 until the academy superintendents suspended the series. Through the efforts and diplomacy of Philadelphia surgeon and sportsman Dr. J. William White, the University gained the agreement of the academies to resume the series in 1899 at Franklin Field inaugurating the tradition of playing the game in Philadelphia. The University credits Penn alumnus and Olympic-medalist George Orton (who had worked with Frank Ellis in managing the Penn Relays) in helping to bring the game to Philadelphia in 1899.

Temple University played its home football games at Temple Stadium until the late 1970s. Temple Stadium, which opened in 1928, seated up to 34,000 for football. Over the years, Temple had played home games at Franklin Field when crowds were expected to exceed Temple Stadium's capacity. Temple moved its home games to Veterans Stadium in the late 1970s but the Phillies had priority for the field for Saturdays during baseball season, which ends the last week in September. When Temple home games conflicted with Phillies home games, Temple would play at Franklin Field. This continued through the 2002 season, Temple's final year at the Vet before the Owls moved to Lincoln Financial Field as tenants of the Eagles. One of the last Temple football games at Franklin Field was a 44–21 loss to the number-one-ranked Miami Hurricanes on September 14, 2002; Miami's Willis McGahee rushed for 134 yards and four touchdowns in front of 33,169 fans.

In 2016, the multi-division Eastern College Athletic Conference (ECAC) held the second installment of its six NCAA Division III post-season bowl games (over three days) at Franklin Field for select member teams that did not make the DIII playoffs. In the series's inaugural year, the games were played at Arute Field in New Britain, Connecticut. The bowl series will move to Delaware Stadium in 2017, but will return to Franklin Field in 2018.

=== Other professional football ===
The NFL's Frankford Yellow Jackets hosted the Dayton Triangles on September 24, 1927, at Franklin Field. The Yellow Jackets usually played their home games in the Frankford section of Philadelphia. The Triangles won, 6–3.

The Philadelphia Bell of the World Football League played their 1975 home games at Franklin Field. (The Bell drew fewer than 12,000 fans total to five home games before the WFL folded in October.)

When the United States Football League's Philadelphia Stars had to move their 1984 playoff games out of the Vet (because the Philadelphia Phillies had games scheduled on those dates), they played at Franklin Field. On June 30, 1984, the Stars defeated the New Jersey Generals, 28–7, behind two touchdowns from Kelvin Bryant; a crowd of 19,038 saw the game on a warm and overcast afternoon. A week later, the Stars downed the Birmingham Stallions, 20-10, in the Eastern Conference championship game at Franklin Field, in front of 26,616 fans. (Both games were carried by ABC Sports, as was the 1984 USFL Championship Game, in which Philadelphia crushed the Arizona Wranglers, 23-3, to claim the league title.)

=== Track and field ===
==== Penn Relays ====
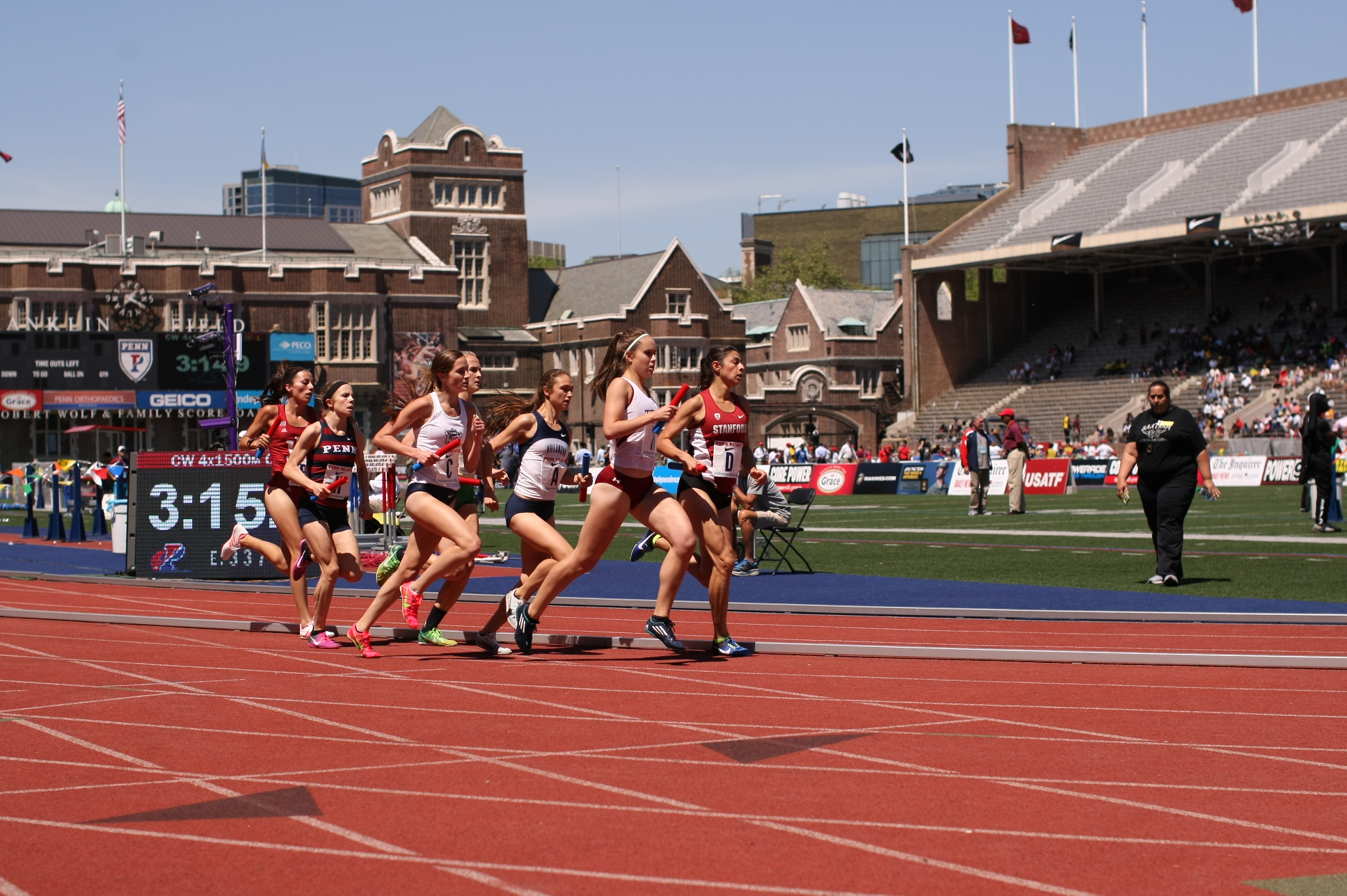
The Penn Relays at Franklin Field in April 2017

Franklin Field has hosted the annual Penn Relays Carnival, the largest track-and-field meet in the U.S., for over 100 years.

The first Penn Relays was held in 1895. Frank B. Ellis, chairman of Penn's track committee, was looking for an event to mark the dedication of the school's then new stadium, Franklin Field. Two years earlier, during his senior year at Penn, Penn and Princeton competed in a one-mile relay race in which four runners from each school each ran a quarter of a mile. That race had been an outgrowth of intramural relay races held at Penn. Ellis and others arranged a series of relay races to take place on Saturday afternoon, April 20, 1895. Sixty-four competitors from eight colleges, six prep schools and two high schools took part. Eight two-team races were run with Harvard beating Penn in the mile-relay feature in 3:34.4.

The Relays were featured in the April 29, 1961, premiere of ABC's Wide World of Sports.

The 2020 and 2021 Penn Relays were cancelled due to the COVID-19 pandemic in the United States. These were the first times the event had been canceled since the event's inception on April 21, 1895.

=== Other meets ===
The 2nd USSR-United States Track and Field dual meet was held at Franklin Field on July 18 and 19, 1959. Stars who competed included Parry O'Brien, Ray Norton, Al Cantello, Hayes Jones, Tamara Press, Vasili Kuznetsov, Dyrol Burleson, Greg Bell, a young Wilma Rudolph, and future long-jump great Igor Ter-Ovanesyan.

Franklin Field hosted the NCAA Men's Outdoor Track and Field Championship in June 1961, the first time the championship was held on the East Coast. Seven records were set, and the University of Southern California won its 21st team Track & Field championship.

Following the Montreal 1976 Summer Olympics and in honor of the United States Bicentennial, Franklin Field hosted The Bicentennial Meet of Champions track and field event on August 4, 1976. Montreal Olympians at the meet included Hasely Crawford, Don Quarrie, Michael Shine and Edwin Moses. The meet was also a chance for top runners including Houston McTear who had not been able to compete in Montreal to race against medal winners. 13,722 attended the event and saw Dwight Stones set a record for the high-jump and John Walker win the mile.

The University of Pennsylvania hosted the two-day 1980 Liberty Bell Track and Field Classic, an alternate to the 1980 Summer Olympics for 26 countries participating in the American-led boycott of the 1980 Summer Olympics which were held in Moscow. The Liberty Bell Classic began on July 16, 1980. It was the largest international track meet held in the U.S. since the 1932 Summer Olympics in terms of the number of foreign competitors. Franklin Field hosted the track and field events where 20,111 spectators saw the final evening of competitions. In several events, the times were better than those in Moscow, such as American Renaldo Nehemiah's time of 13.31 in the 110m hurdles ahead of East German gold medal winner Thomas Munkelt's time of 13.39.

In 2025, Franklin Field hosted the 3rd leg of the inaugural Grand Slam Track season.

=== Track configuration ===
The track in Franklin Field has a rarely used configuration where the 400 metre circumference is achieved in lane 4, rather than in lane one. Thus there are two curbs on the track, inside of lane one and also inside of lane 4. In order to accommodate the full fields of the Penn Relays and other meets, special adaptations are made with a movable curb on the backstretch to stagger the runners to arrive at a common break point in lane 4, rather than the conventional lane one. Single lap races in the inner lanes, run portions of an extra straightaway. Multiple lap races spend the majority of the race in lane 4 to run the proper distances.

The Franklin Field track has utilized a Rekortan track surface since 1987. The track was last renovated in 2015 when ATT Sports, Inc., installed the current Rekortan M99 track surfacing. The track was resurfaced again by ATT Sports, Inc. in the summer of 2024.

== Other sports ==
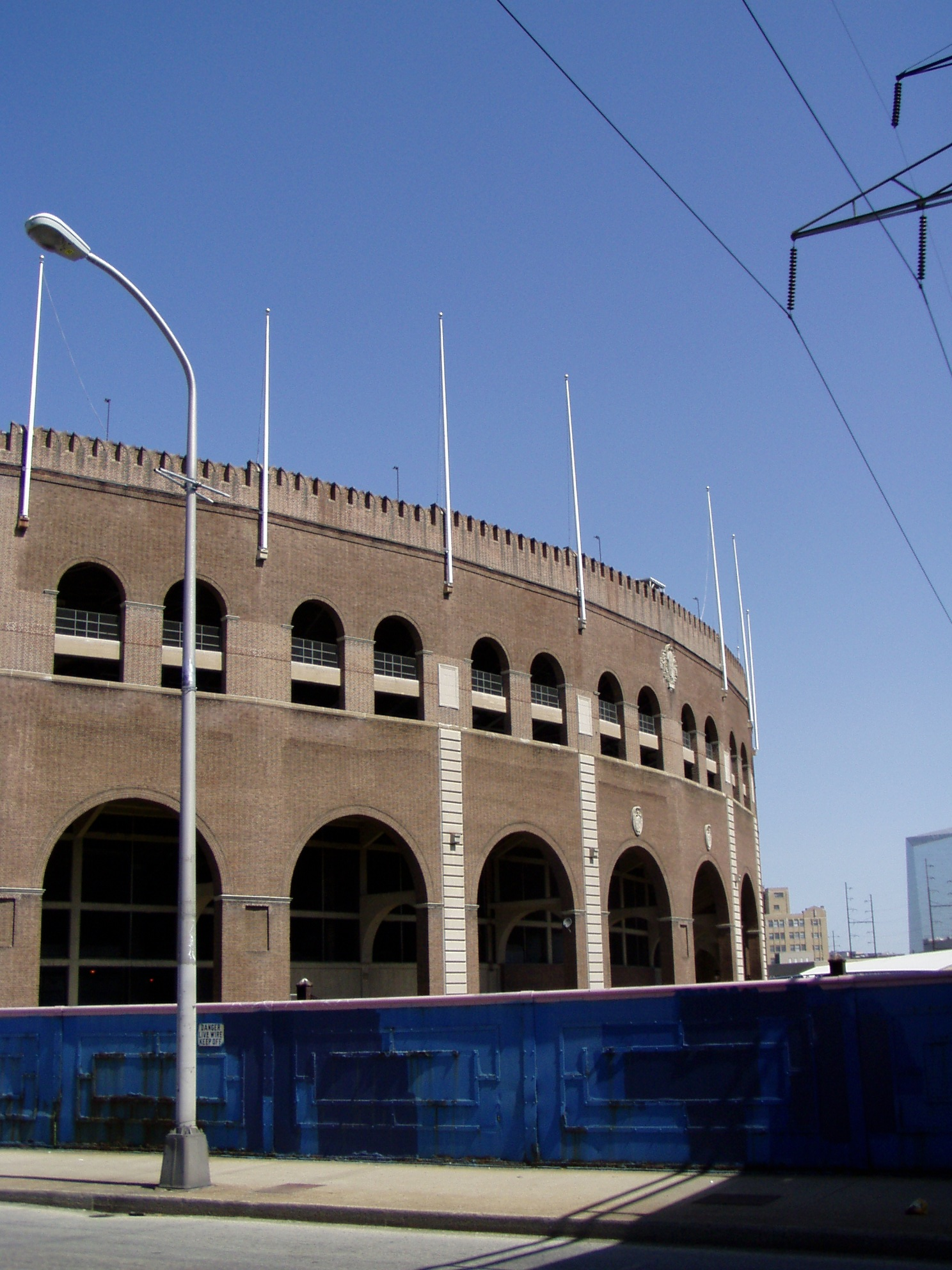
The arched exterior of Franklin Field in April 2006

Franklin Field served as the home field for Penn's baseball, whose varsity baseball team played at Franklin Field beginning from 1895 through 1939.

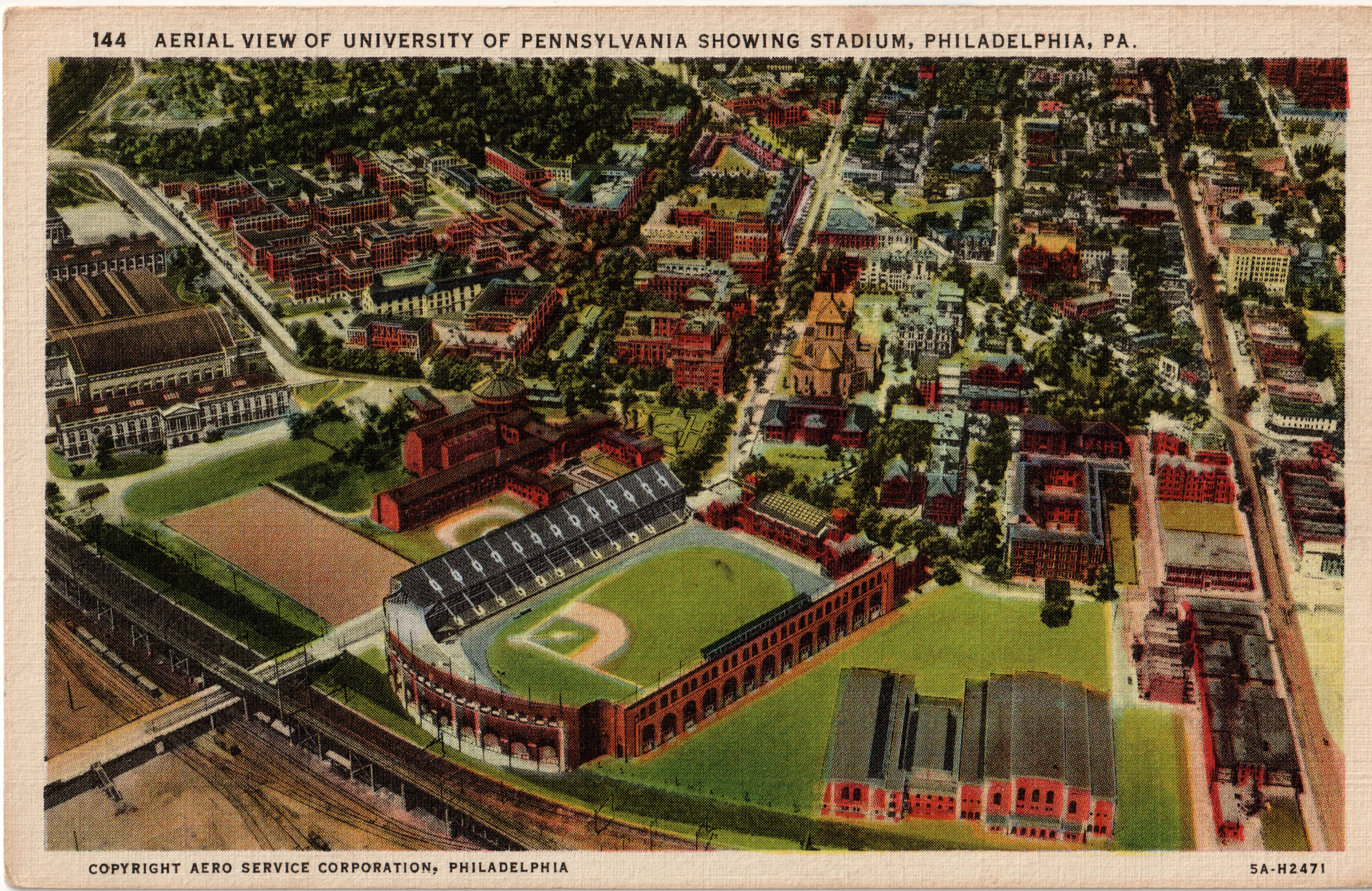
Aerial view of University of Pennsylvania showing stadium with baseball configuration circa 1940s

Franklin Field was the longtime home of Philadelphia's city title high school football championship game. The game was held at the stadium in 1938, 1940, 1941, and from 1943 through 1972, before it moved to Veterans Stadium. On Thanksgiving Day, 1941, 40,000 fans watched West Philadelphia tie West Philadelphia Catholic, 0–0. In 1945, 54,000 fans saw Southern beat West Catholic, 18–13. The 1946 game, played before 60,000, ended in a riot when Northeast fans stormed the field in the final minute of the school's 33–26 victory over West Catholic, prompting West Catholic fans to do the same.

The NASL Philadelphia Atoms had played at Veterans Stadium from 1973 to 1975. They moved to Franklin Field in 1976 which had better sight lines for soccer. Attendance was 8,400 for the home opener on May 2, 1976. They drew a season high of 25,000 for the July 17 match against the New York Cosmos which featured soccer great Pelé. The team averaged 6,449 at Franklin Field for their 11 home matches in 1976. The Philadelphia Fury hosted a play-off game against the Tampa Bay Rowdies on August 23, 1979, at Franklin Field when the Fury's home field, Veterans Stadium, was being used by the Phillies.

Along with John F. Kennedy Stadium, also in Philadelphia, Franklin Field was one of 15 United States stadiums inspected by a five-member FIFA committee in April 1988 in the evaluation of the United States as a possible host of the 1994 FIFA World Cup. On August 25, 1989, a crowd of 43,356 at Franklin Field saw the US national soccer team defeat Dnepr of the Soviet Top League, 1–0; Eric Eichmann scored the lone goal in the game's 12th minute.

On November 30, 2004, Franklin Field was home to the first rugby league match between the United States and Australia. The United States led the World Cup-holders Australia for much of the game, but eventually lost, 36–24.

The stadium hosted the Division I NCAA Men's Lacrosse Championship in 1973 and 1992 and the NCAA Division I Women's Lacrosse Championship in May 2007.

April 14, 2012, marked the debut of Franklin Field as the home stadium for the Philadelphia Spinners in their first AUDL season. An estimated 1700 were in attendance as the Spinners defeated the Buffalo Hunters, 26–14. The Spinners continued to use Franklin Field for the rest of the 2012 season and used it for two games in the 2014 MLU season.

The inaugural Major League Ultimate championship game was played at Franklin Field on July 13, 2013. The Boston Whitecaps defeated the San Francisco Dogfish, 20–15. The Stadium again hosted the MLU championship on July 16, 2016, as the Philadelphia Spinners defeated the Portland Stags, 14–11.

== Other events ==
=== Entertainment ===
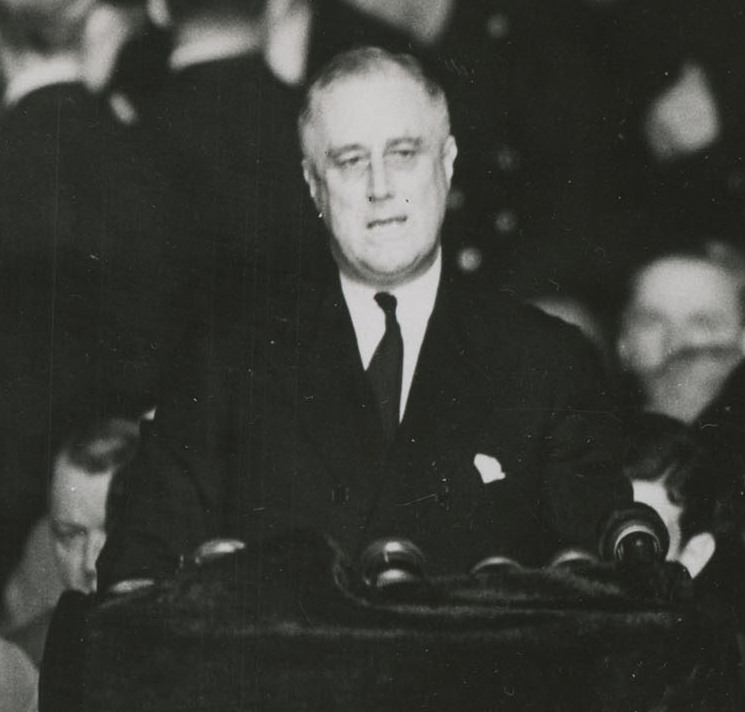
U.S. president Franklin D. Roosevelt accepts the Democratic Party's 1936 presidential nomination at Franklin Field on June 27, 1936.

Drum Corps International held its annual Drum and Bugle Corps World Championships at the stadium in 1975 and 1976.

On June 8, 1997, Franklin Field hosted Irish rock band U2 during the first leg of their PopMart tour, which was the stadium's first concert since the 1970s.

=== Films ===
The 2000 M. Night Shyamalan–directed movie Unbreakable features Franklin Field as one of its main locations. Its main character, played by Bruce Willis, works as a security guard at the stadium.

In the 2006 movie Invincible, Franklin Field served as a stand-in for the demolished Veterans Stadium, whose images were digitally superimposed on some of the football action sequences.

=== Politics ===
The stadium was the site of the speech by President Franklin D. Roosevelt in which he accepted the 1936 Democratic Party's nomination for a second term as president. It is estimated that a crowd of 100,000 sat through intermittent rain at Franklin Field to hear FDR's speech.

== See also ==
- List of NCAA Division I FCS football stadiums

Preceded by Shibe Park	Home of the Philadelphia Eagles; 1958–1970	Succeeded by Veterans Stadium
Preceded by Schoellkopf Field	Host of the Drum Corps International; World Championship; 1975–1976	Succeeded by Mile High Stadium
Preceded by Byrd Stadium	Home of the NCAA Lacrosse Final Four; 1973	Succeeded by Rutgers Stadium I
Preceded by Ralph Korte Stadium	Host of the College Cup; 1976	Succeeded by California Memorial Stadium
