= Jon Polito =

American actor (1950–2016)

- Polito in 1989
- Born: Jon Raymond Polito; December 29, 1950; Philadelphia, Pennsylvania, U.S.
- Died: September 1, 2016 (aged 65); Duarte, California. U.S.
- Occupation: Actor
- Years active: 1981–2016
- Spouse: Darryl Armbruster (m. 2015)
- Relatives: Jack Polito (brother)
- Awards: Cinequest Film Festival: Maverick Spirit Award (2005); HRIFF: Best Actor in a Short Film (2012)

Jon Raymond Polito (December 29, 1950 – September 1, 2016) was an American character actor whose 35 year film and television career saw him often playing policemen or criminals.

When asked about his being typecast, he said "Pray for typecasting... if you are a type, then you can work." "I don’t have a problem (with typecasting) — first of all, my theory is there are only gangsters and cops. There are also fathers, but they are really boring unless some tragedy happens to the father. ...I don’t mind typecasting, but I will not do the same thing over again."

Polito's over 220 acting credits included television roles playing Detective Steve Crosetti in the first two seasons of Homicide: Life on the Street and Phil Bartoli on the first season of Crime Story. He also appeared in several films including The Rocketeer, The Crow and Gangster Squad, as well as his work with the Coen brothers. He appeared in five of their films, including Miller's Crossing, Barton Fink and The Big Lebowski. Polito also portrayed hungry i nightclub impresario Enrico Banducci in a large supporting role in Tim Burton's 2014 film Big Eyes.

Asked about his eclectic approach to accepting diverse acting roles, Polito said "I’m basically kind of a whore when it comes to work. Whatever comes down the pike, I’ll do it. It’s what I’ve been doing since working with the Coen Brothers for the first time... I try to do any style of show that there is."

== Early life and education ==
Polito was born December 29, 1950 in Philadelphia, Pennsylvania, the third of John and Delaida "Dee" (née Pompei) Polito's three children. He had an older sister and brother, Rosemary Simpson and animator Jack Polito.

=== Found acting in high school and continued in college ===
Polito found his career in acting while attending the West Philadelphia Catholic High School for Boys. He explained "I was a very scared kid. No confidence, fat, strange... that was it until I found the theater." His acting roles in high school included the "Persian Peddler" in the 1967 West Philadelphia Catholic High School for Girls' production of Oklahoma!.

After high school he earned a fully paid drama scholarship at Villanova University. During that time, he was also a student of Irene Baird at the University of the Arts in Philadelphia.

== Stage career ==
=== Began acting on Broadway ===
Moving to New York City in 1977, Polito's first Broadway theatre role was as an understudy in the David Mamet play American Buffalo. His theatrical career included many Broadway and off Broadway productions where he shared the stage with actors Faye Dunaway in The Curse of an Aching Heart in 1982, Sigourney Weaver as well as Dustin Hoffman and John Malkovich in the acclaimed 1984 Broadway revival of Arthur Miller's Death of a Salesman.

=== Death of a Salesman ===
In 1984 Polito played opposite Dustin Hoffman and John Malkovich in a revival of Arthur Miller’s 1949 play Death of a Salesman. In the play, Polito's character Howard Wagner fires Hoffman’s Willy Loman at a critical point in the plot. Hoffman found Polito's performance overwhelming in the off-Broadway rehearsals.

Polito recalled:

"I was nearly fired from the production when we opened in Chicago... they wanted me to read for the character of Biff because they couldn’t get a commitment for one year from John Malkovich... Well, I never wanted to play a Biff a day in my life. I never liked the character. I just couldn’t do it. So in my audition, I actually went on the stage in front of [Dustin] Hoffman and said, “I don’t want to play Biff, I don’t want to read for Biff. I’m only interested in the role of Howard,” which they had already committed to someone else... So I was cast (as Biff) doing that kind of performance, but when we opened the play in Chicago, Hoffman did not get good reviews.

Basically, the problem seemed to center on that Death Of A Salesman scene. And it was about the fact that Hoffman was looking at me and he was seeing me see him as the loser he was. So he couldn’t really finish the play. He was crying a lot from that scene on... They almost fired me without telling me and then they finally brought me in for a meeting with Arthur Miller and with Dustin Hoffman and the director Michael Rudman... And I remember turning to Hoffman and saying, “What the hell…? Why are we doing this? What the hell did you cast me for? What’s the problem here? I wanted to do my performance. What the hell is the problem?” And Hoffman turned to me and said, “I can’t finish the play.” And I said, “What do you mean?” And he explained to me... he would like very much if I could adjust my performance for the previews. And I said, “For the previews?” And he said, “For the previews, out of town, so I can start to create my performance based on what I’m seeing you do as much meaner than what you’re being.” So I said, “Can I open in New York with my performance?” And he said, “Yes.”

So basically... the performance I began to give out of town was this kind of wicked, mean guy. And then, slowly, when we got to Washington, to the Kennedy Center, I remember him coming up before we started those performances and he said, “You can lighten up more.” And then when we got to New York, (Hoffman) said, “You can go back to your performance.” Hoffman was incredibly generous and he is an incredibly generous and interesting performer who was really tackling a tough role. So I was more than glad to do that."

A Washington Post review said Polito turned in "memorable performances as... (Hoffman's) cold-hearted boss." Another reviewer said "The scene with Hoffman and Polito in particular, in which the older man begs the son of his former mentor for work, is raw and uncomfortable to witness".

The Broadway production with the original cast including Polito was filmed and premiered on CBS September 15, 1985. It earned 10 nominations at the 38th Primetime Emmy Awards ceremony, and four Golden Globe nominations at the 43rd Golden Globe Awards ceremony, winning three and one, respectively.

== Television career ==
In 1981 Polito made his television debut portraying the real-life mafia co-founder Tommy "Three Finger Brown" Lucchese in the NBC series The Gangster Chronicles. He was a series regular on Syfy’s The Chronicle and Steven Bochco’s Raising the Bar. He appeared on Chicago Hope, It’s Always Sunny in Philadelphia, Modern Family, N.Y.P.D. Blue, Roseanne and Two and a Half Men.

Polito's guest star appearances on television shows included Silvio the landlord on Seinfeld and as Rhonda, his only appearance as a woman on The Chris Isaak Show.

=== Crime Story ===
In 1986 Polito portrayed mob crime boss Phil Bartoli during the first season of Michael Mann's noir Crime Story on NBC.

He said the show taught him how to be a better actor. "Crime Story was where I learned that I needed to get to know every crew member... By asking them what they did and taking an interest in them, they took an interest in me... when the scene is shooting, you then know that, for the most part, those guys are watching you act. And therefore you’ve got an audience. And that’s when my acting began to be much more, to me, natural. I was able to watch my acting and see a performance instead of being self-conscious. So that was the gift of Crime Story".

=== Miami Vice ===
In 1988 Polito appeared in a Miami Vice episode as El Gato, a drug dealer. He said of the role "El Gato was brilliant. That was an insane role. Basically, the word I got was an offer, there was no audition. They said, 'We’ve got a gay Hispanic drug-dealing, drug-taking lunatic, and we thought of you.' I thought, 'Hey! That’s perfect'."

=== Homicide: Life on the Street controversy ===
In 1993 Polito was offered a role as a Polish-American detective on the NBC show Homicide: Life on the Street. When the series' co-creators Barry Levinson and Tom Fontana cast Polito they changed the character to a hardened, wise-cracking Italian-American detective named Steve Crosetti.

The show initially earned lackluster viewership and low ratings. Cancellation was a continual threat. NBC pressured the producers to include a new female character (Megan Russert) hoping to gain broader appeal. In order to afford a new character, Polito's character was written out of the show for budgetary reasons at the end of Season 2.

Polito recalled Fontana saying "You have to be dropped now, but I'll bring you back — I didn't believe that because I'd been screwed by so many producers over the years... I didn't trust him. So after he said, 'NBC wants to get the girl on the show, and they have to replace somebody, and we're gonna choose you, but I'll bring you back in the fall', I instead, very stupidly, went to the newspapers... (saying) some very vicious comments". "I was wrong to jump at Fontana and all that, and not believe in Fontana and Levinson, because they're great people and would've been faithful to me, but I just didn't trust it because I'd been screwed too many times before". The outburst caused a rift with Fontana. Early in Season 3, Polito's character committed suicide and was eliminated. Polito again complained to the media, triggering a highly public dispute with Fontana. Interviewed about the situation in 2005, Polito expressed regret for his handling of the matter. He and Fontana later reconciled, and the Crosetti character returned to make a farewell appearance as a spirit in Homicide: The Movie.

== Film career ==
=== Coen brothers collaboration ===
In 1990 Polito was cast by the Coen brothers’ to play Italian mafioso Johnny Caspar in their neo-noir gangster film Miller's Crossing.

The Coens had seen Polito in the 1984 Broadway revival of Arthur Miller's Death of a Salesman. They initially approached him to play the part of The Dane in Miller's Crossing but after reading the script Polito turned that part down, saying he was only interested in playing the role of gangster Johnny Caspar. The Coens auditioned several other actors but eventually chose Polito after they made him read his entire role cold.

It would be the first of five films Polito made with the brothers. He was next offered the role of Lou Breeze in their film Barton Fink (1991). They had written the role specifically for him. He again turned down the Coens' offer, saying he instead wanted to play the part of film producer Jack Lipnick. Actress Frances McDormand persuaded him to take the Lou Breeze role, saying it would change his career. He later appeared as an eccentric businessman in The Hudsucker Proxy (1994), in The Big Lebowski (1998) as a private detective and finally in 2001 as a flirtatious salesman in The Man Who Wasn't There.

== Voice actor ==
Polito performed voice acting on 18 animated series, including American Dad, Avatar: The Last Airbender, Chowder, El Tigre: The Adventures of Manny Rivera and ThunderCats. He was also a voice actor on video games.

== Personal life ==
Polito was gay and married fellow actor Darryl Armbruster on October 16, 2015, fifteen years after they first met.

== Death ==
Polito was diagnosed with multiple myeloma in 2010. In 2012 he was reported to be in remission. Four years later, while being treated at the City of Hope National Medical Center in Duarte, California, he fell into a coma and was removed from life support on September 1, 2016. He was 65 years old.

== Accolades ==
- 1980: Obie Award in 1980 for his theater performances off Broadway
- 2001: Telly Awards - Voice Over, The Dancing Pumpkin animated short
- 2005: Cinequest Film Festival - Maverick Spirit Event Award "for outstanding achievement in film and television in recognition of his body of work"
- 2012: Hollywood Reel Independent Film Festival - Best Actor, Short Film (Anti-Muse)
- 2018: Seattle International Film Festival - Best Ensemble in a Feature Film

== Filmography ==
=== Film ===
Jon Polito film credits
Year	Title	Role	Notes	Ref
1982	The Clairvoyant	Detective Sporaco	Also known as The Killing Hour	
1984	The Princess and the Call Girl	Private Detective		
1984	C.H.U.D.	Newscaster		
1985	Compromising Positions	1st Cop	Credited as John Polito	
1985	Remo Williams: The Adventure Begins	Zack		
1986	Highlander	Detective Walter Bedsoe		
1986	Dream Lover	Dr. James		
1986	Fire with Fire	Boss		
1987	Critical Condition	Kline		
1988	Homeboy	Moe "Fingers"		
1990	The Freshman	Chuck Greenwald		
1990	Miller's Crossing	Giovanni Gasparo / Johnny Caspar		
1991	Barton Fink	Lou Breeze		
1991	The Rocketeer	Bigelow		
1992	Leather Jackets	Jack "Fat Jack"		
1992	Flodders in America	Larry Rosenbaum	Flodder in Amerika! in Dutch	
1993	The Contenders	Pedro Perusia		
1994	The Hudsucker Proxy	Mr. Bumstead		
1994	The Crow	Gideon		
1994	Blankman	Michael "The Suit" Minelli		
1995	Fluke	Boss		
1995	Bushwhacked	FBI Agent Palmer		
1996	Homeward Bound II: Lost in San Francisco	Ashcan	Voice	
1996	Just Your Luck	Nick	Direct-to-video	
1996	Inside Out	Paparazzi	Short film Included in Boys Life 3	
1997	The Corporate Ladder	Mr. Deacon		
1998	The Big Lebowski	Private Investigator Da Fino		
1998	With Friends Like These...	Rudy Ptak		
1998	Tale of the Mummy	Parsons		
1998	Music from Another Room	Lorenzo Palmieri		
1998	Nowhere Land	Frank		
1999	Angel's Dance	Vinnie "Uncle Vinnie"		
1999	Road Kill	"Jelly"		
1999	The Green Mile	D Block Prison Guard	Uncredited	
1999	Stuart Little	Detective Sherman		
1999	Carlo's Wake	Uncle Gus		
1999	Surgeon General's Warning	The Other Guy	Short film	
2000	The Adventures of Rocky and Bullwinkle	Schoentell		
2000	The Dancing Pumpkin		Animated short Credited as John Polito	
2000	The Tangerine Bear: Home in Time for Christmas!	Virgil	Voice	
2000	Boys Life 3	Paparazzi	Segment: Inside Out	
2000	Flies on Cupid	Giorgio Gagantano		
2001	The Tailor of Panama	Ramón Rudd, The Banker		
2001	Frank's Last Dance	Frank	Short film	
2001	Mimic 2	Morrie Deaver	Direct-to-video	
2001	The Shrink Is In	Judge Bob		
2001	The Man Who Wasn't There	Creighton Tolliver		
2001	After Sex	Naldo	Credited as John Polito	
2002	Black Mask 2: City of Masks	King		
2002	29 Palms	The Security Guard		
2003	The Singing Detective	Second Hood		
2003	View from the Top	Roy Roby		
2003	No Credits, No Peace	The Network Executive	Short film	
2003	The Box	Michael Dickerson		
2004	Charlie the Ox	Freddy Boon		
2004	The Last Shot	Wally Kamin		
2005	Short Order	Tony		
2005	The Honeymooners	Kirby		
2006	The Alibi	Jimmy, The Photographer	Released on DVD as Lies & Alibis	
2006	Cutting Room	Sandy		
2006	Grilled	Leon Waterman		
2006	Flags of Our Fathers	Borough President		
2006	Big Nothing	FBI Agent Hymes		
2006	Happily N'Ever After	Wolf 1	Voice; Credited as John Polito	
2006	Cleaners		Short film	
2007	Cougar Club	Mr. Archibald		
2007	American Gangster	Rossi		
2008	The Marconi Bros.	Lou Burns		
2008	Bart Got a Room	Bob		
2008	Animated American	Max Rabbit	Short film	
2009	Super Capers: The Origins of Ed and the Missing Bullion	Captain Sludge		
2009	Locker 13	Don Dillon	Short film Also known as Locker 13: Down and Out	
2010	DC Showcase: The Spectre	Police Captain	Voice, short film	
2010	Burning Palms	Ned		
2010	The Grind	HIM		
2010	Venus & Vegas	Frank		
2010	The Last Godfather	Don Bonfante		
2010	Stiffs	John "The Prince" Monaco		
2010	The Talking Head	Mr. Opportunity	Short film	
2011	Son of Morning	Mr. Bordasche		
2011	Atlas Shrugged: Part I	Orren Boyle		
2011	From the Head	Vinnie		
2011	Batman: Year One	Commissioner Loeb	Voice, direct-to-video	
2012	Jonny Boy	Jonny Boy	Short film	
2012	Anti-Muse	Anti-Muse	Short film	
2013	Gangster Squad	Jack Dragna		
2014	Big Eyes	Enrico Banducci		
2018	The Maestro	Herbert Englehart	Final film role; posthumous	

=== Television ===
Jon Polito television credits
Year	Title	Role	Notes	Ref
1981	The Gangster Chronicles	Tommy "Three Finger Brown" Lucchese	Television miniseries	
1983	Running Out	Joe Poswalsky	Television film	
1984	A Good Sport	Man in Taxi	Television film	
1985	Death of a Salesman	Howard	Television film	
1986	A Deadly Business	Vitola	Television film	
1986	The Equalizer	Gianni Greco	Episode: "Unpunished Crimes"	
1986–1988	Crime Story	Phil Bartoli	16 episodes	
1987	The Equalizer	Gene Carmack	Episode: "Memories of Manon" (Parts 1 & 2)	
1987	Ohara	Captain Ross	11 episodes	
1988	Alone in the Neon Jungle	Brad Stakowski	Television film	
1988	Wiseguy	Eddie Van Platt	Episode: "Player to Be Named Now"	
1988	Miami Vice	El Gato	2 episodes	
1989	The Equalizer	David Pfieffer	Episode: "Silent Fury"	
1989	Livin' Large	Sal	Television film	
1989	Trying Times	Agent Caponello	Episode: "Death and Taxes"	
1991	Tales from the Crypt	Nikos Stano	Episode: "Deadline"	
1991	Empty Nest	Slocum	Episode: "Harry's Got a Gun"	
1992	Hearts Are Wild	Leon "Pepe" Pepperman	4 episodes	
1992–1994	Murder, She Wrote	Lieutenant Peter DiMartini	2 episodes	
1993	Dinosaurs	Ty Warner	Voice; Episode: "Swamp Music"	
1993	Fallen Angels	Al Reseck	Episode: "I'll Be Waiting"	
1993	The Untouchables	Tommy Palumbo	2 episodes	
1993–1994	Homicide: Life on the Street	Detective Steve Crosetti	13 episodes	
1994	Viper	Councilman Strand	Episode: "Pilot"	
1994	Girls in Prison	Boss Johnson	Television film	
1994	The Shaggy Dog	Detective Al	Television film	
1995	Chicago Hope	Detective Bill Ranford	Episode: "Life Support"	
1995	Mad About You	Ralphy	Episode: "My Boyfriend's Back!"	
1995	Burke's Law	Tony Renaldo	Episode: "Who Killed Cock-a-Doodle Dooley?"	
1995	NYPD Blue	Paul Biaggi	Episode: "One Big Happy Family"	
1995	The Invaders	Whitley, Metro HQ	Miniseries; Uncredited	
1995	High Society	Alvin Spalding	Episode: "We Ought to Be in Pictures"	
1995–1996	Dream On	Louie	4 episodes	
1996–1998	New York Undercover	John Dennis	2 episodes	
1996	High Incident	Victor the Clown	Episode: "Women & Children First"	
1996	Swift Justice	Tom Luddy	Episode: "Supernote"	
1996	The Pretender	Ben Hansel	Episode: "A Virus Among Us"	
1996	Roseanne	Mr. Russo	Episode: "Millions from Heaven"	
1996–2000	The Pretender	Constantin Falzone / Ben Hansel	2 episodes	
1997	Fired Up	Sam Harris	Episode: "Domestic Bliss"; Unaired	
1997	Over the Top	Mr. Hampstead	Episode: "The Bee Story"	
1997	Life with Louie	Red Meat	Voice; Episode: "Louie's Harrowing Halloween"	
1997	Night Man	Al Capone	Episode: "That Ol' Gang of Mine"	
1997	Invasion	Detective Kemper	Miniseries	
1997–2000	Early Edition	Cliff Mourning / Louie DeFozio	2 episodes	
1998	Players	Pappas	Episode: "Mint Condition"	
1998	Jenny	Sid Bouchie	Episode: "A Girl's Gotta Get It"	
1998	Seinfeld	Silvio	Episode: The Reverse Peephole"	
1998	New York Undercover	Rinaldi / John Dennis	2 episodes	
1998	The Defenders: Choice of Evils	District Attorney Al Orsini	Television film	
1998	Money Play$	Lou Spano	Television film	
1998	Honey, I Shrunk the Kids: The TV Show	Marvin 'Marv' Fishland	Episode: "Honey, She's Like a Fish Out of Water"	
1998	Veronica's Closet	Mr. Lehman	Episode: "Veronica's Dog Day Afternoon"	
1998	Millennium	Eddie Scarpino Giannini	Episode: "Omerta"	
1999	Nash Bridges	Roland Margolis	Episode: "Truth and Consequences"	
1999	Good vs. Evil	Howard	Episode: "Sunday Night Evil"	
1999	The Apartment Complex	Dr. Caligari	Television film	
2000	Homicide: The Movie	Steve Crosetti	Television film	
2000	Popular	Caesar Croutons	Episode: "Hard on the Outside, Soft in the Middle"	
2000	The Invisible Man	Eddie The Mammoth	Episode: "Pilot"	
2000	Gideon's Crossing	Lou Peda	Episode: "The Race"	
2000	Batman Beyond	Major	Voice, episode: "Betrayal"	
2000	Oh Yeah! Cartoons	Fisherman	Voice, episode: "Tales from the Goose Lady: The Fisherman, the Fisherman's Wife, and the Fish"	
2000	Nature Boy	Mort Ruby	Television film	
2001	The Chris Isaak Show	Rhonda Parks	Episode: "Our Place"	
2001–2002	The Drew Carey Show	Stansfield	3 episodes	
2001–2002	The Chronicle	Donald Stern	22 episodes	
2002	Becker	Leonard Nagle	Episode: "Piece Talks"	
2002	Time Squad	Al Capone	Voice, episode: "The Clownfather"	
2002	Women vs. Men	Desk Sgt.	Television film	
2002	Push, Nevada	Silas Bodnick	Episode: "The Amount"	
2002	She Spies	Edward Malloy	Episode: "Ice Man"	
2002–2003	Gilmore Girls	Pete / Father in Kirk's Film	2 episodes	
2003	Dragnet	Richard Maughm	Episode: "The Silver Slayer"	
2003	Crossing Jordan	Dick	Episode: "Wild Card"	
2003	The Lyon's Den	Mr. Carpeggi	Episode: "Trick or Treat"	
2003	Life on Parole	Ernie	Television film	
2003–2004	Oliver Beene	Mr. Rayfield	2 episodes	
2004	10-8: Officers on Duty	Enzo Fontana	Episode: "Wild and the Innocent"	
2004	It's All Relative	Leonard	Episode: "A Long Day's Journey Into Leonard's"	
2004	Judging Amy	District Attorney Gerald Abner	2 episodes	
2004	The Jury	Johnny Pappas	Episode: "The Boxer"	
2004	Scrubs	Mr. Summers	Episode: "My Female Trouble"	
2004	My Wife and Kids	Minister	Episode: "The Wedding"	
2005	Family Plan	Gold	Television film	
2005	Desperate Housewives	Charles Skouras	Episode: "Love Is in the Air"	
2005	Without a Trace	Jimmy 'The Tooth' Fusco	Episode: "Lone Star"	
2005	American Dad: The New CIA	Petruchio	Animated TV short	
2005	Gone, But Not Forgotten	Sam Oberhurst	Miniseries	
2005	Threshold	Nicky Frost	Episode: "The Order"	
2005	Avatar: The Last Airbender	Chief Arnook	Voice, 3 episodes	
2005	The Buzz on Maggie	New Aldrin / New Pupert	Voice, episode: "Those Pesky Roaches"	
2005–2008	Ghost Whisperer	Joe Grimaldi	2 episodes	
2006	Masters of Horror	Montesquino	Episode: "Haeckel's Tale"	
2006	Handy Manny	Joe Bolotero	Voice, episode: "Supremoguy/Tool Talk"	
2007	Medium	Vincent DiScala	Episode: "Better Off Dead"	
2007–2008	El Tigre: The Adventures of Manny Rivera	Don Bafi Big Man	Voice, 3 episodes	
2008	Las Vegas	The Cleaner	Episode: "Guess Who's Coming to Breakfast"	
2008	Rock Monster	The Colonel	Television film	
2008	Chowder	Funjl / Guy	Voice, episode: "The Moldy Touch/The Heavy Sleeper"	
2008	Do Not Disturb	R.J.	Episode: "Dosing"	
2008	Chocolate News	Harvey Silverstein	"Episode 7"	
2008	Two and a Half Men	Mr. Sharipa	Episode: "He Smelled the Ham, He Got Excited"	
2008–2009	Raising the Bar	Judge Dominick Ventimiglia	10 episodes	
2009	Monk	George Gionopolis	Episode: "Mr. Monk Fights City Hall"	
2009	Citizen Jane	Detective Romer	Television film	
2009–2010	Glenn Martin DDS	Vito Renzuli	2 episodes	
2010	The Mentalist	Duesterberg	Episode: "Red Herring"	
2011	Funny or Die Presents...	Eddy	Episode #2.1 - Segment: "United States Police Department"	
2011	Ben 10: Ultimate Alien	Mizaru	Voice, episode: "Simian Says"	
2011	It's Always Sunny in Philadelphia	Gino Reynolds	Episode: "Frank's Brother"	
2011	ThunderCats	Conquedor	Voice, episode: "Berbils"	
2012	Franklin & Bash	"Lucky" Louie Gianelli	Season 2 episode 3: "Jango and Rossi"	
2012	Robot and Monster	Sir Cranklin	Voice, episode: "First Impressions"	
2012	Mike & Molly	Frankie Moranto	Episode: "Thanksgiving Is Canceled"	
2012–2013	Bunheads	Sal Russano	2 episodes	
2014	Castle	Harold Metzger	Episode: "That '70s Show"	
2014	Murder in the First	Judge Greer / Judge Emerson Greer	3 episodes	
2014	39 to Go	Mathis	2 episodes	
2014	Saint Francis	Cupcake	Television film	
2014–2016	Modern Family	Earl Chambers	3 episodes	
2015	Broker	Ignacio Ronconi	TV short	
2016	American Dad!	Dr. Kalgary	Voice, episode: "Roots"	
2016	Comedy Bang! Bang!	Frank O'Brien	Episode: "Tony Hale Wears a Blue Flannel Shirt and Fuchsia Sneakers"	
2016	Major Crimes	Dino Kotero	Episode: "Cashed Out"	
2016	Ultimate Spider-Man	Hammerhead	Voice, episode: "Return to the Spider-Verse: Part 3"; Posthumous release; dedicated in memory	
2017	The Super Man	Floyd	Episode: "Dumpster Diving"; Posthumous release	
2017	Rapunzel's Tangled Adventure	Griffon of Pittsford	Voice, episode: "Not in the Mood"; Final TV role; posthumous release	

=== Video games ===
Year	Title	Role	Notes
1999	Lands of Lore III	Dark Army Orc / Elliott The Guard / Viscosa	Voice
2007	Dead Head Fred	Ulysses S. Pitt	Voice
2013	Batman: Arkham Origins	G.C.P.D. Commissioner Gillian B. Loeb	Voice
2016	Batman: Arkham Underworld	Carmine Falcone	Voice
