= West Philadelphia Catholic High School for Boys =

Private high school in Pennsylvania, US

Coordinates: 39.9585°N 75.2195°W

West Philadelphia Catholic High School for Boys (West Boys, West Catholic, Burrs) was founded in 1916. A school building was later constructed at 49th Street between Chestnut and Market Streets in Philadelphia, Pennsylvania. The school closed its doors in 1989 when the co-educational West Philadelphia Catholic High School opened in the former West Philadelphia Catholic Girls High School building at 45th and Chestnut Street.

== History ==
The School began in 1916 with students at both Transfiguration Parish School and later at St. Gregory's Parish School. Designed by the firm Hoffman-Henon Co., the school was built on Chestnut St. around 1921. It consisted of two connected buildings. The original staff were the Marianist Brothers. They were replaced in 1926 by the Brothers of the Christian Schools, who administered the school until its closing by the Archdiocese of Philadelphia in 1989. An additional High School was built for the education of the area’s young women in 1927. The teams nickname was the 'Burrs".

For the first half of the 20th century, city title games, which pitted the champions of the Public and Catholic Leagues, often filled Franklin Field, the longtime home of Philadelphia's City Title high school football championship game. The game was held at the stadium in 1938, 1940, 1941, and from 1943 through 1972, before it moved to Veterans Stadium. On Thanksgiving Day, 1941, 40,000 fans watched West Philadelphia tie West Philadelphia Catholic High School for Boys, 0–0. The 1946 game, played before 60,000, ended in a riot when Northeast fans stormed the field in the final minute of the school's 33–26 victory over West Philadelphia Catholic High School for Boys, prompting West Catholic fans to do the same. In 1945, 54,000 fans saw Southern West Philadelphia Catholic High School for Boys, 18–13.

In 1984, West Catholic High School for Boys was one of sixty recognized by the Council of American Private Education as an exemplary high school.

The school colors were blue and white and its motto was Pro Deo et Patria (For God and Country).

The West Catholic Alumni Association, a 501(c)(3) non-profit organization, remains the official alumni association for West Catholic Boys as well as for the male graduates of West Philadelphia Catholic High School. The Association's website is www.westcatholicalumni.org.

== See also ==
- West Philadelphia Catholic High School
