= Jack Polito =

American animator (born 1941)

- Born: Joachim Polito; December 4, 1941 (age 83); Philadelphia, Pennsylvania, U.S.
- Occupation: Animator
- Years active: 1960s–present
- Relatives: Jon Polito (brother)

Joachim Polito (born December 4, 1941) is an American animator who has worked in the film industry since the 1960s. He was inspired by the 1933 film King Kong. Polito formed the animation company The Production House in 1980.

== Early life ==
Joachim "Jack" Polito was born in 1941 in Philadelphia, Pennsylvania. In 1951, Polito's father took him to see the King Kong rerelease of the 1933 film. This experience inspired him to follow a career in animation and special effects. He graduated from West Catholic High School in Philadelphia in 1959. Polito played tennis all through high school, and was a member of the Adoration Society. After graduating, he got his first animation job at DeFrenes Studio. Polito was the brother of actor Jon Polito.

== Career ==
Polito has worked in animation and has been part of the film industry since the 1960s. He moved to Hollywood in 1966 to work at the special effects department at 20th Century Fox. He met acclaimed individuals in the film industry like Max Steiner, L. B. Abbott and Linwood Dunn. He also met Merian C. Cooper and established a strong relationship with him. Polito discovered and restored film footage from the original King Kong film in the 1960s. Because of his love of film and passion for the movie, Polito became a collector of King Kong items. He even discussed with Peter Jackson, who directed the King Kong release of 2005.

Polito became the head of art and animation for DeFrenes Studios and Animation Arts Associates. He was also the head of Cinemotion in Philadelphia, an animation company. He has even received an Oscar nomination for his work.

Polito left DeFrenes to begin Production House, an animation studio, in 1980. They started making TV commercials and working on industrial animation and then made cartoons. They made animation using drawings to depict movement. Polito worked as a cameraman, animation cameraman, director, and animator. He Started the Production House in Philadelphia in 1980. He worked with Dava Jennings. His company worked on advertisements or industrial animation during the 1980s for his clients and had high-end clients like Welch's, Raytheon, and Honda. However, toward the end of the 1980s, the company experienced severe reduction in sales and revenue due to the recession. Production House turned to the entertainment industry. Polito worked on the production of The Dancing Pumpkin and other children's productions. They also worked on a cartoon called A Fairy's Tale. They also helped animate G.A.M.M.A. Force which consisted of 13 half-hour cartoons.
