= Piero Pòlito =

Piero Pòlito (Bologna, 24 June 1925 – Florence, 2010) was an Italian poet, literary critic and writer.

== Biography ==
Born in Bologna to a well-off family, after moving around following his parents he finally settled in Florence at the end of the 1930s. He studied at the University of Florence where he had the chance to attend Giuseppe De Robertis' courses and discussed a thesis on D'Annunzio with him.

Throughout his career he contributed with critical writings, prose and poetry, to radio programmes, newspapers and literary magazines.

He passed away in 2010 in Florence, his mother's birthplace.

== Literary works ==
- "Occhi composti" (Firenze, Nuovedizioni Enrico Vallecchi, 1979)
- "Pegni" (Firenze, Pananti, 1993)
- "Reminiscenze e rammarichi" (Firenze, Poli stampa, 1998)
- "Fascinazioni" (Firenze, Falciani, 2001)
- poesie di "Microcosmo" (Firenze, Vallecchi, 1963)
- "Santi in paradiso" (Firenze, Vallecchi, 1963)
