= Portland Stags =

- Sport: Ultimate
- Founded: 2013
- Conference: Western
- Team history: 2013-2016
- Based in: Portland, Oregon
- Stadium: Milwaukie High School
- Championships: 0
- Website: www.portland.stags.mlultimate.com

The Portland Stags were an American semi-professional ultimate team based in Portland, Oregon. The Stags competed as part of Major League Ultimate (MLU) in the league's Western Conference until the league suspended operations in 2016. The team was one of the original eight teams that formed the MLU in 2013. The team saw the post-season three times and in 2016 saw its first appearance at the MLU Championship.

In 2022, Portland Nitro began playing ultimate for the Ultimate Frisbee Association.

== History ==
=== 2013 ===
For their inaugural season the General Manager, Nathan Schorsch, brought on long-time ultimate player Justin Becker to lead the Stags as head coach. The first game of the Stags career began against the San Francisco Dogfish. While it was a fairly close game the Dogfish claimed victory 11-14. It wasn't until the fourth week of the season that the Stags found their first victory, playing again against the Dogfish, this time in Portland at Lewis and Clark College. Both teams played a close match with the Dogfish leading for a majority of the game, but the Stags were able to pull ahead in the final minutes. This was the Stags only victory of the season, leaving them with a 1-9 record.

=== 2014 ===
In their second season, the Stags looked to overhaul not only their losing but the entire team's philosophy by bringing on head coaches Danny Quarrel and Mike Knapp. Despite, or because of, little roster turnover from 2013 to 2014 there was little thought of the Stags making their way out of the MLU basement. One additional roster addition of note was the signing of Seattle Rainmaker Mark Burton, who was the second highest goal scorer in 2013.

Opening the season with a 23-21 over the #2 ranked Vancouver Nighthawks turned a few heads for the Portland Stags. The Stags continued to impress with two victories over the San Francisco Dogfish and didn't see their first loss until week 4 when they dropped a game 23-25 against the Rainmakers. The Stags finished out the regular season 8-2 with losses to both the Rainmakers and the Nighthawks. With the best record in the Western Conference, the Stags saw their post-season and hosted the Vancouver Nighthawks at Lincoln High School Stadium. While the Nighthawks were able to take an early lead the Stags were able to tie up the game but never found themselves at the advantage and missed their first shot to the MLU Championship 13-14.

=== 2015 ===
The 2015 season brought further coaching changes for the Stags when Mike Knapp left the team. Join head coach Danny Quarrell and filling Knapp's absence were two assistant coaches, Mike Grill and former player turned player-coach John Thornton. With 20 returning players the Stags experienced little roster turnover from 2014 to 2015, with all of their top players returning.

The Stags were able to roll through the conference with only a single loss, coming against the Dogfish in week six, 17-18. With the conference record, the Stags again hosted the Western Conference Championship (again at Lincoln High School Stadium) this time facing off against the second-ranked Seattle Rainmakers. The Rainmakers were able to take advantage of an early lead in the game that they never gave up, ending the Stags second post-season run 16-17.

=== 2016 ===
In 2016 the Stags won the Western conference final. They lost the MLU final to the Philadelphia Spinners.

== Venues ==
2013-2015 Lewis and Clark College 2015 Hillsboro Stadium 2016 Milwaukie High School
