= World Disc Games =

The World Disc Games (WDG) is a semi-regular event that brings the entire world flying disc community together for a week of overall disc events that allow people to compete in and enjoy disc sports. Beginning in 1978, and originally called the Santa Cruz Flying Disc Classic, the WDG has its home in Santa Cruz, California, with promoter and hall of fame disc sport player Tom Schot.

Disc sports competitions at the WDG include ultimate, freestyle, disc golf, discathon, self-caught flight, accuracy, distance, and double disc court. In July 2003, World Disc Games X held in Santa Cruz with over 500 participants.

== See also ==
- Ken Westerfield
- Flying disc games
- Flying disc freestyle
- World Flying Disc Federation
