= Flying disc freestyle =

Outdoor sport

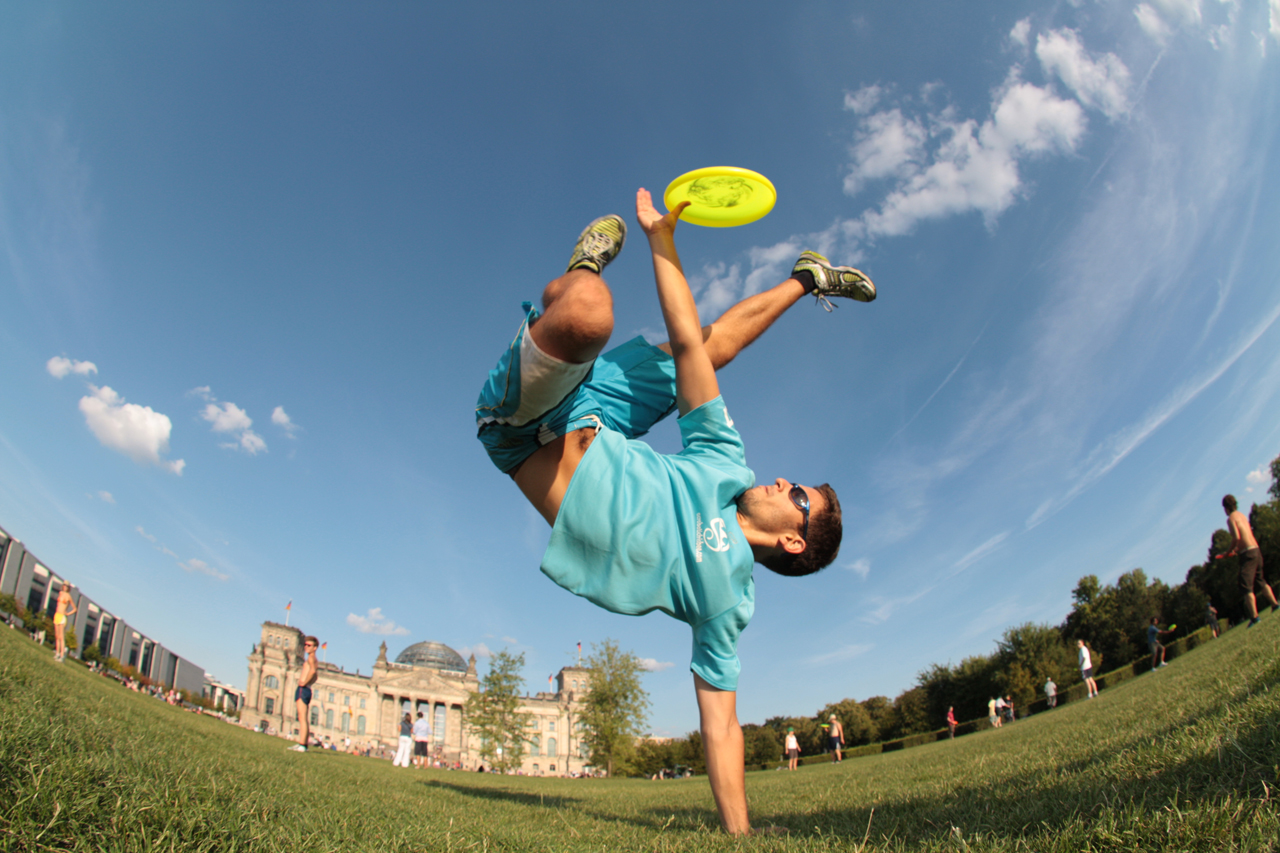
A professional freestyler performing an acrobatic maneuver

Flying disc freestyle, also known as freestyle Frisbee in reference to the trademarked brand name, is a sport and performing art characterized by creative, acrobatic, and athletic maneuvers with a flying disc. Freestyle is performed individually or more commonly in groups, both competitively and recreationally.

The Freestyle Players Association (FPA) is the governing body of freestyle, "dedicated to the growth of freestyle disc play as a lifetime recreation and competitive sport. The organization is involved in international tournaments and rankings as well as education grants and promotional activities. Every year, the FPA holds a world championship with divisions in Open Pairs, Mixed Pairs, Open Co-op, and Women's Pairs. Competitive freestyle is usually judged on execution, difficulty, and artistic impression by a panel of players.

== History ==
By the late 1960s and early 1970s, modern flying discs had become a popular pastime in the United States, developing into various disciplines such as double disc court, disc guts, ultimate, disc golf, and disc freestyle. At the time, most disc players were overall players, participating in all the various disciplines. Freestyle began in the 1960s with a few players, like Victor Malafronte, John "Z" Weyand, Ken Westerfield, Kerry Kollmar and Dan Roddick trying to perform more complex trick catches and throws. Freestyle was introduced as its own competitive discipline, with the first Frisbee freestyle competitions occurring in 1974, at the Canadian Open Frisbee Championships, Toronto, Ontario, and the Vancouver Open Frisbee Championships, Vancouver, BC.

Freestyle in the beginning before the invention of the "nail delay" catching possibilities would depend on the throw you were given, it was always spontaneous and unpredictable. Play of this type of freestyle was performed with two players standing 30–40 yards apart, the throws were fast and varied and the catches were right off the throw, except for the occasional kick or slap-up and rarely a pause between the catch and the throw back. At advanced levels, the throws and catches would become a flow that was created once you mastered the basics. It was fast and fluid and visibly would resemble martial arts and dance.

One of the earliest distinctly freestyle disc maneuver was the tip, the act of quickly pressing fingers on the bottom of the disc to maintain or alter its position without catching the disc or letting it fall to the ground. Tipping first began in the early 70s, becoming more popular and refined by 1975. The tip, according to some histories, eventually led to the nail delay, considered by many to be the beginning of modern freestyle. The invention of the nail delay is disputed, but its first tournament appearance occurred when Freddie Haft performed the delay in the freestyle pairs event at the 1975 American Flying Disc Open (AFDO) in Rochester, NY. This was the first freestyle event held in the US. The nail delay involves balancing the disc on the fingernail while the disc continues to spin. This technique allows freestylers to change the flight path of the disc and perform numerous balletic and technical maneuvers such as restricted pulls, holds, turnovers, and shoots.

The pinnacle of freestyle as a commercial and popular venture was in the late 1970s and early 1980s when Wham-O sponsored major tournament circuits culminating in the Rose Bowl, an overall event with a prominent freestyle component. Experienced players would collect points in smaller tournaments to win a spot in the Rose Bowl. Famous appearances include freestyle legends Johnny Dwork, Joey Hudoklin, Donnie Rhodes, Bill Wright, and Jens and Irwin Valasquez.

By 1981, Wham-O changed management and pulled its funding from freestyle. Subsequently, the growth of freestyle severely declined, with play mostly limited to Americans introduced to the sport in its first two decades. By the late 1990s, freestyle seemed to be in decline as few new players began playing. By the mid-2000s, however, the sport experienced a resurgence of growth in Europe, South America, and Japan. The cause of this resurgence is debated, but most attribute the growth to Paganello (a large, Italian ultimate tournament that sponsored a popular freestyle event) and its early proponents (and FPA Board members) Larry Imperiale and Paul Kenny, the impact of touring American players like Jens and Erwin Valasquez as well as Tom Leitner and Sune Wentzel (as part of a Nike tour), and a popular Nike commercial featuring two leading American freestylers, Dave Murphy and Dave Lewis. Today freestyle has a renewed popularity in the United States, as jammers across the country seek to emulate prodigy Emma Kahle (a.k.a. M-Maw), as well as in Germany, Czech Republic, Italy, Japan, Israel and Colombia.

== Getting started ==
Freestyle is performed indoors and outdoors, on fields and on the beach. The style and technique of players often depend on the conditions they play in, especially the wind. Freestyle jams, as they are called, involve anywhere from 2 to 15 people, but most hover between 2–5. A jam with more than 4 or 5 is often called a "mob-op" as opposed to pairs (2 players) or co-op (3 players). Most competitive freestyle today centers around the nail-delay with many players using what are called delay-aids (plastic nails and silicone sprays). There is also a faster throw and catch version that can be played without the use of delay-aids.

=== Equipment and play ===
Freestyle is performed with a lighter, usually 160 gram disc. The disc can be sprayed with some kind of lubricant for facilitating the nail delay such as silicone spray. In freestyle competitions, most advanced players wear fake nails made out of acrylic, some organic materials like bones or antlers, and other plastics, which are glued onto fingernails during play, though they are not necessary. A faster throwing and catching version of freestyle (fast-freestyle) can be played without the use of equipment (nail-delay paraphernalia, sprays and plastic nails).

== Basic maneuvers ==
=== Tipping ===
Tipping is performed by poking the center of the disc with various body parts to cause the disc to "pop up," usually maintaining the angle of the disc and its spin. Tipping is performed with finger tips, elbows, knees, feet, and even the top of the head. Joey Hudoklin's famous tipping combo is considered the epitome of this technique.

=== Brushing ===
Brushing involves swiping the disc tangentially with the rotation of the disc. Brushing is performed with the hands, knees, and feet.

=== Rolling ===
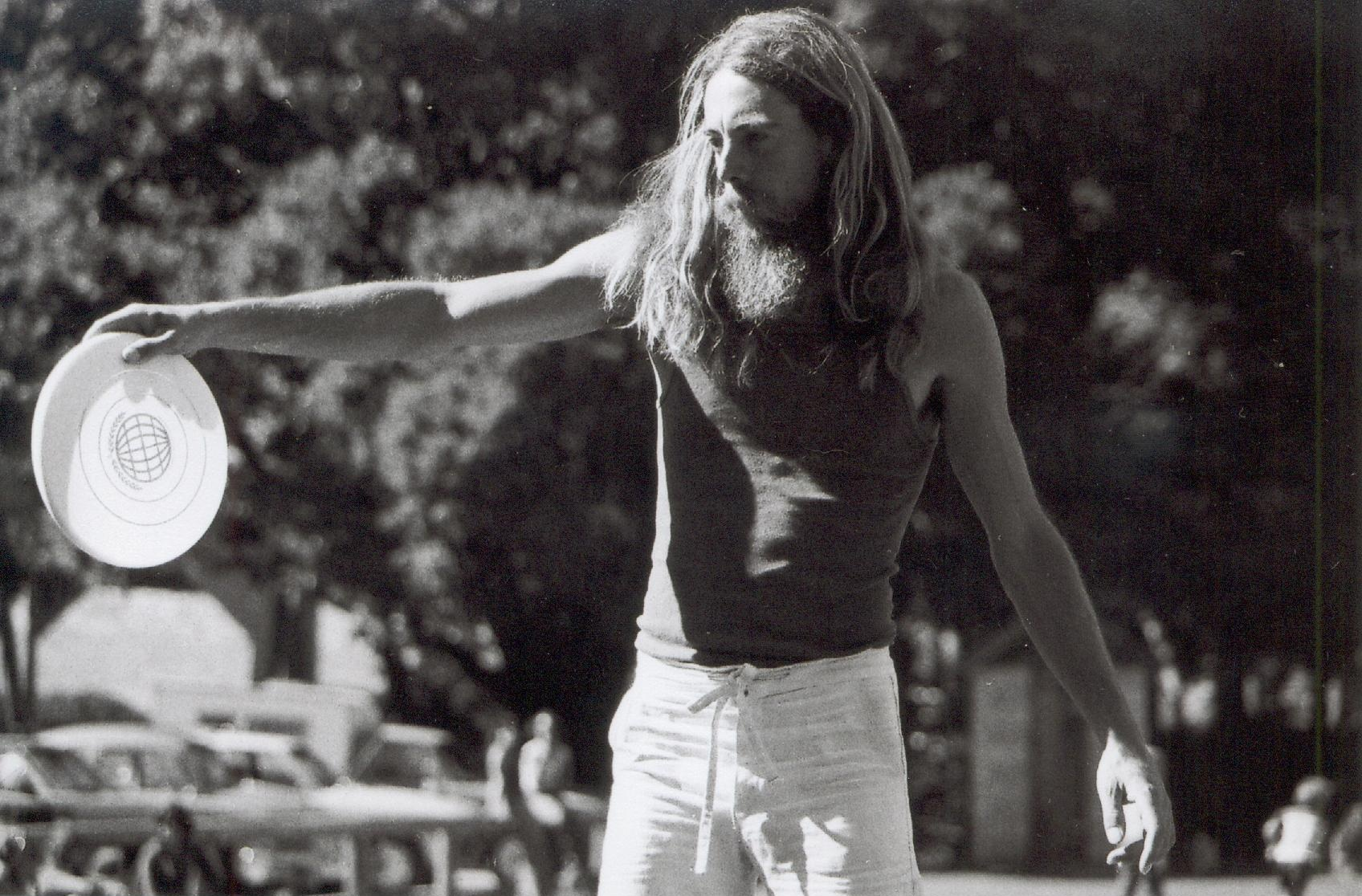
Ken Westerfield helped to popularize the flying disc as an alternative sport in the 1960s and 70s

Rolling, first demonstrated by Ken Westerfield in 1975, is performed when the disc rolls across any part of the body. The most common roll is the chest or front roll, which is performed when the disc rolls from one hand, across the chest, to the second hand to be caught or released for more maneuvers. Experienced players often perform front, back, and leg rolls, with and against the spin, in creative combination.

=== Delaying ===
The nail delay involves balancing the disc on the nail (or occasionally teeth, feet, and elbows) to manipulate the disc's position. The delay can be performed on the rim of the disc in vertical, angled, or centered/flat positions. Most players have a spin preference, preferring either clockwise or counterclockwise, but most players, especially advanced players can perform maneuvers with both spins. The delay is characteristic of more modern, technical freestyle, which uses the delay to perform more complicated maneuvers like turnovers and "against the spin" moves (manipulations that use angle and carefully applied friction to force the disc in a direction that its spin counteracts, a technique invented and mastered by Skippy Jammer).

=== Turnovers ===
A turnover is performed when the disc is changed from a right-side up position to an upside-down position. The turnover is a popular, technical aspect of the game that requires proper leverage, a pivot point, and usually a "spin change." A spin change involves changing the disc from counterclockwise to clock or clock to counterclockwise. The physics of turnover requires that the disc change spin, relative to the player, unless the turnover is a "360" turnover involving two spin changes, arriving back at the original spin.

=== Catches ===
Freestyle catches are generally split into two overlapping categories: blind and restricted. Blind catches are ones where the player cannot see the disc entering the hand and include popular moves such as scarecrow and phlaud. Restricted catches involve positioning the hand around some part of the body, such as under the leg or behind the back. One of the most famous and iconic freestyle catches is called "gitis" and involves catching a disc with one hand over and around the opposite leg. Catches can also be performed between the legs or by resting on parts of the body such as the back.

=== Throws ===
Freestyles often incorporate different kinds of throws to add difficulty and style as well as create various kinds of spin and angles. Basic throws include backhand, sidearm (forehand), overhand wrist-flip, staker, and helicopter. More advanced throws include blind, restricted, and special MAC throws (any throw that involves hitting the top of the disc mid-flight with a free limb, like the opposite hand, foot, or elbow, to create extra spin, slow the velocity, and change the angle).

== Major events ==
- FPA Worlds
- World Urban Games
- Paganello
- World Flying Disc Federation (WFDF) Championship
- EFC – European Freestyle Championships

See FPA Schedule of Events
