= Frisbee sports =

Types of sport

Flying disc sports are sports or games played with discs, often called by the trademarked name Frisbees. Ultimate frisbee and disc golf are sports with substantial international followings. Guts Frisbee was the first organized frisbee sport, established in 1958.

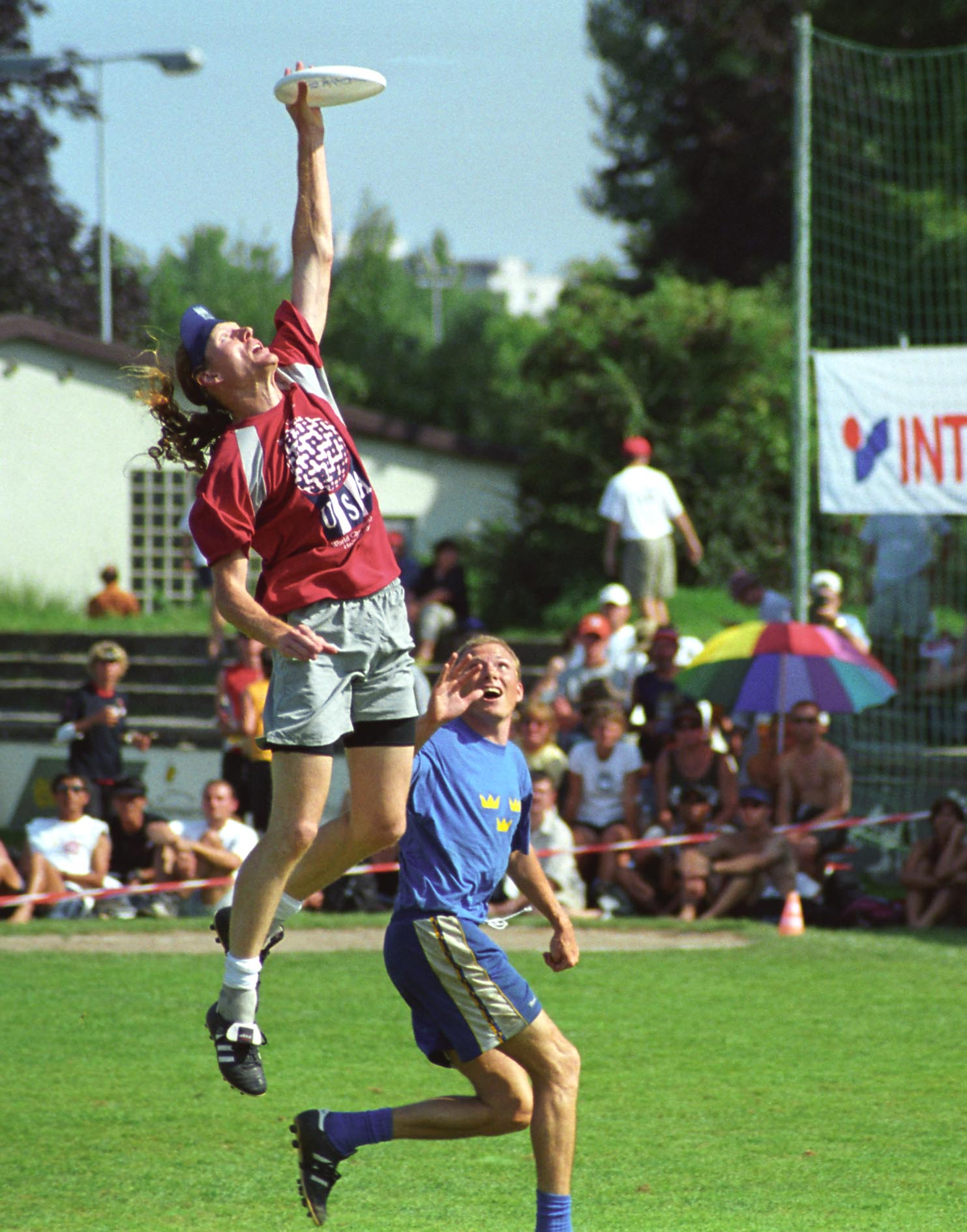
A semi-professional ultimate game in North America

== History ==
The flying disc was developed in 1948 by Walter Morrison. On January 23, 1957, Wham-O bought the rights to the invention and released it later under the trademarked name Frisbee.

Although playing catch with discs as a pastime and proto-golf games are documented from the early 1900s, and doubtlessly occurred from time to time before, disc sports began to flower in the late 1960s. As many young people became alienated from social norms, they sought alternative recreational activities, including throwing a Frisbee. What started with a few players in the sixties, like Victor Malafronte, Z Weyand and Ken Westerfield experimenting with new ways of throwing and catching a disc, later would become known as playing disc freestyle. Organized disc sports flourished in the 1970s with promotional efforts from Wham-O and Irwin Toy (Canada). These were national tournaments and Frisbee show tours at universities, fairs, and sporting events. Disc sports such as freestyle, double disc court, guts, ultimate and disc golf were among frisbees first sporting events. Two sports, the team sport of ultimate and disc golf, are very popular worldwide and are now being played semi-professionally. The World Flying Disc Federation, Professional Disc Golf Association and the Freestyle Players Association are the official sanctioning organizations for disc sports worldwide.

Guts Frisbee was invented by the Healy Brothers in 1958. It remains the premier event at the International Frisbee Tournament (IFT), the oldest frisbee tournament in the world. Ultimate, the most widely played disc sport, began in the late 1960s with Joel Silver and Jared Kass. In the 1970s, it developed as an organized sport with the creation of the Ultimate Players Association with Dan Roddick, Tom Kennedy, and Irv Kalb. Double disc court was invented and introduced in the early 1970s by Jim Palmeri. In 1974, freestyle competition was created and introduced by Ken Westerfield and Discraft's Jim Kenner. Judging standards were developed by the Freestyle Players Association. In 1976, the game of disc golf was standardized with targets called "pole holes" invented and developed by Wham-O's Ed Headrick and the Professional Disc Golf Association.

Beginning in 1974, the International Frisbee Association (IFA), under the direction of Dan Roddick, became the regulatory organization for all of these sports.

== Ultimate Frisbee ==
Ultimate playing field

Ultimate Frisbee (sometimes called Ultimate) is a competitive non-contact team sport. The object of the game is to score points by passing the disc to a team member in the opposing team's end zone. Players may not move about the field while holding the disc. Catching is done with one hand or both hands on the rim or with hands simultaneously on the top and bottom, sometimes referred to as a clap-catch. When catching with one hand on the rim, paying attention to hand placement is essential, so that you catch on the correct side of the disc, depending on the direction in which the disc is spinning. One side will tend to spin out of your hand, while the other side will spin into your hand, making for a more secure catch. Many players avoid this problem by catching with both hands when possible. The most popular throws used in a game of ultimate are Flying disc techniques, backhand, sidearm/forehand, hammer, and scoober. Being a deep threat, with multiple throwing techniques and the ability to pass the disc before the defense has had a chance to reset, is always optimal. Some players use a throw and catch freestyle practice to help improve their ultimate handling skills. The game was invented in 1968 as an evening pastime by Jared Kass. Ultimate is distinguished by its Spirit of the Game - the principles of fair play, sportsmanship, and the joy of play. USA Ultimate (USAU) and Ultimate Canada are the rules and sanctioning organizations for ultimate in the US and Canada. While USAU and WFDF rulesets differ, the organizations have been working together over the past 3 years to bring the rulesets into closer alignment. The American Ultimate Disc League (AUDL) and Major League Ultimate (MLU) are the first men's semi-professional ultimate leagues. The Major League Ultimate (MLU) ceased operation on December 21, 2016. In 2019, the Premier Ultimate League, ultimate's first Women's semi-pro league launched followed by the Western Ultimate league in 2020. Currently, the highest level of International Ultimate is the World Games, followed by the World Ultimate and Guts Championship.

=== Games based on Ultimate ===
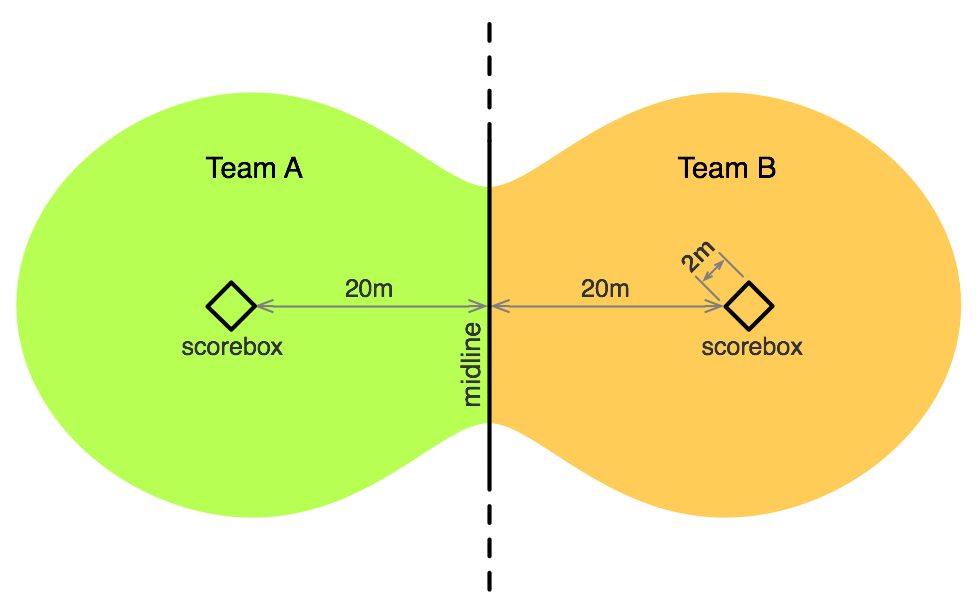
The Schtick Disc field, showing opposing team territories and scoreboxes.

A number of games have evolved that are derived or similar to Ultimate, but played with different rules. These games are often played when available fields or teams are too small for a full-sized ultimate game.

Game	Description
Goaltimate	a half-court flying disc game derived from ultimate, similar to Hot Box
Hot box	a non-contact team sport which is similar to Ultimate, but played on a smaller field and with fewer players
Mini ultimate	a high-energy, predominantly urban sport played on a smaller field than ultimate
DiscHoops	also known as D-Hoops, is a flying disc sport that combines ultimate and basketball. It is played on a regulation basketball court, making use of existing floor markings to define its boundaries and obstacles. It is played with a 145 gram disc and a specifically designed apparatus called the Disc Hoops Rim that is affixed to the rim of a basketball goal. Larry Storey is the inventor of both the sport and the Disc Hoops Rim.
Schtick disc	an Ultimate variant played with two discs where running with the disc is allowed; generally more forgiving operations of play than most team sports makes the game more fun and accessible to players of varied abilities than traditional ultimate. The game was conceived and pioneered by a group of friends from Delaware, USA and/or graduates of Rice University, and was first played in 1994 on Assateague Island. It has since been played throughout the US and in Australia as well, having been featured at Sydney's Longest Day Beach Ultimate Tournament since 2001. Typically, a football halfway line is used to mark the midline, as precise knowledge of the line's position is frequently required for tactical play. Scoreboxes can be marked out by any means that is easily visible, though traditionally bundled socks or knotted rags have been used.
Kan-jam	is a flying disc game, played with a flying disc and two cans in which you deflect the disc into the can.

Many other rules variants for ultimate are played regularly, either to accommodate the number of available players, speed up certain elements of the game, or to help a team practice specific aspects of their strategy.

== Disc golf ==
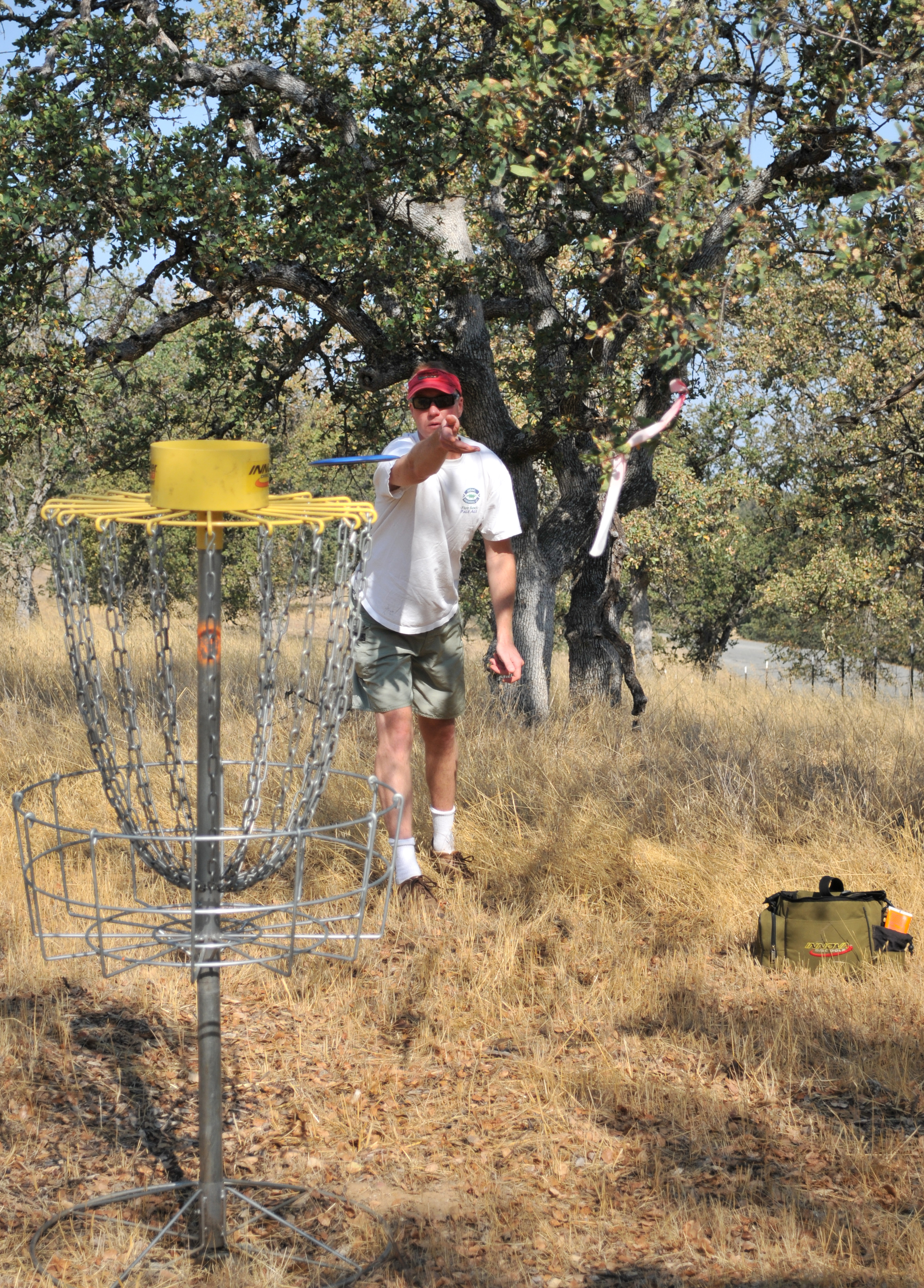
Disc golf pole hole, a standardized disc golf target created by Ed Headrick.

Disc golf is a game based on the rules of golf (sometimes jokingly referred to by disc golfers as ball golf or “bolf”). It uses discs smaller and denser than an ultimate disc. The discs are thrown towards a target, which serves as the "hole". The official targets are metal baskets with hanging chains to catch the discs. In 2016, the PDGA severed ties with WFDF, leaving it unclear who is the primary driver for global growth of the game.

=== Urban disc golf ===
Before there were standardized targets called pole holes, disc golf used to be played in parks and urban settings using natural objects as targets. In some cases courses were created by the players themselves as they played, with each player taking turns determining targets and throwing designations (mandatories and out of bounds)

== Freestyle play and competition ==
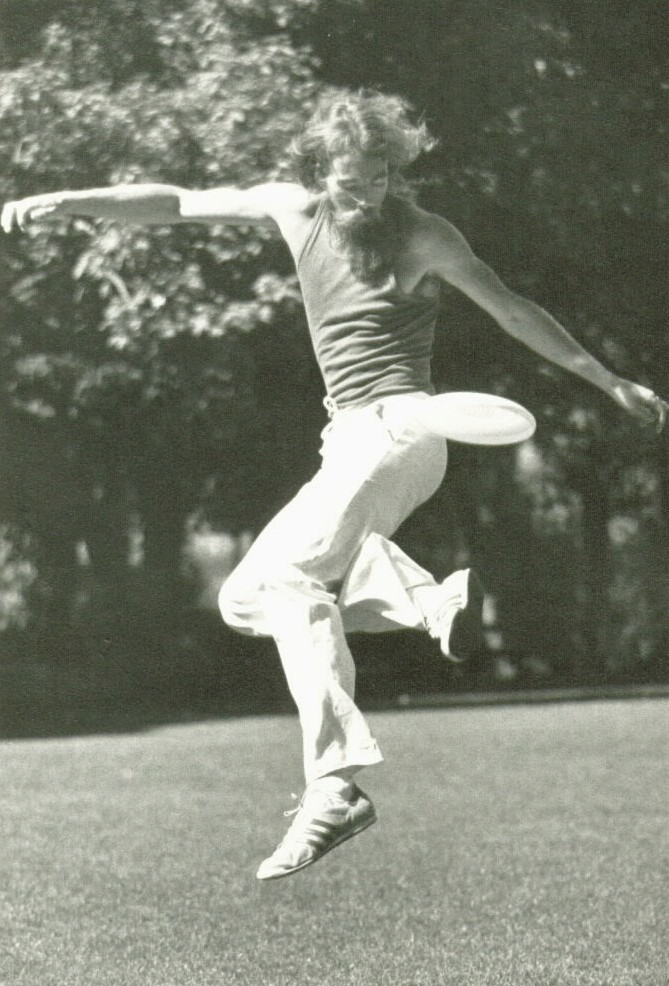
Ken Westerfield, playing freestyle, 1960s-70s.

Disc freestyle, also known as freestyle Frisbee, is a sport and performing art characterized by creative, acrobatic, and athletic maneuvers with a flying disc. Freestyle can be performed either individually or, more commonly, in groups. It is done for both competitive and recreational purposes. In the early 1970s, before the invention of the "nail-delay", freestyle catching possibilities would depend on the throw you were given; it was always spontaneous and unpredictable. Play with this type of freestyle was performed with two players standing 30-40 yards apart. The throws were fast and varied, and the catches were right off the throw, except for the occasional kick or slap-up, and rarely a pause between the catch and the return throw. At advanced levels, the throws and catches would become a flow that is created once you master the basics. It was fast and fluid, and would visibly resemble martial arts and dance. Most competitive freestyle today centers around the nail-delay with many players using what are called delay-aids (plastic nails and silicone sprays).

Many players of other disc sports will often use a throw-and-catch (no plastic nails or sprays) version of freestyle to warm up for their disc games. Ultimate disc players often use freestyle to improve their throwing and catching skills as well as a good way to add focus and flexibility to their game.

Freestyle competition is an event where teams of two or three players perform a routine that consists of a series of creative throwing and catching techniques set to music. The routine is judged based on difficulty, execution, and presentation. The team with the best total score is declared the winner.

In 1974, Ken Westerfield and Jim Kenner (founder and CEO of Discraft), introduced and won the first flying disc freestyle competition at the 3rd annual Canadian Open Frisbee Championships, Toronto, Ontario, Canada and the Vancouver Open Frisbee Championships. These were the first Frisbee freestyle competitions.

A year later the American Flying Disc Open (AFDO) in Rochester, New York, the Octad in New Brunswick, New Jersey, and the 1975 World Frisbee Championships held at the Rose Bowl in Pasadena, California, adopted Westerfield and Kenners freestyle competition format as one of their events. Today, this same freestyle event is one of the popular events in Flying disc tournaments worldwide.

The Freestyle Players Association was formed to oversee the competitive aspects of freestyle frisbee and to help new players learn how to freestyle.

== Guts ==
Guts or Guts Frisbee is a disc sport involving teams throwing a flying disc at members of the opposing team. One to five team members stand in a line facing the opposing team across the court, with the two teams lined up in parallel. Which team begins play is determined by "flipping the disc", an action similar to a coin toss, but using the disc itself. One member of the team is then selected to start play.

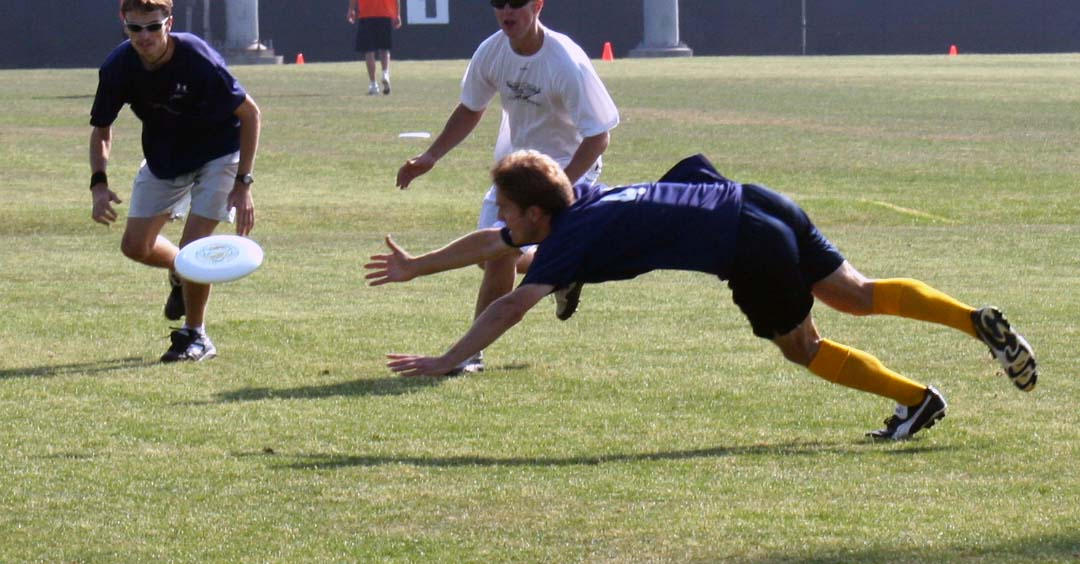
Guts Frisbee is the oldest disc sport (1957)

That member then raises an arm to indicate readiness to throw, at which point the members of the opposing team freeze in position. If the thrower misses the "scoring area" (a demarcated area a bit larger than the space occupied by the opposing team), the receiving team scores a point. If a player on the receiving team catches the disc, neither team scores a point. If the throw is within the scoring area and the receiving team fails to catch, or catches but drops the disc, the throwing team gets a point. The receiving team then picks up the disc and becomes the throwing team. The receiving team must catch the disc cleanly in one hand, and may not move from position until after the disc leaves the hand of the thrower. The disc may not be trapped between the hand and any other part of the body, including the other hand. This frequently results in a challenging sequence of "tips" or "bobbles", which are rebounds of the disc off of receivers' hands or body to slow the disc down and keep it in play until it can be caught. This often involves multiple players on the receiving team. Play continues until at least 21 points have been scored by one of the teams and there is a difference in score of at least 2 points.

== Double Disc Court ==
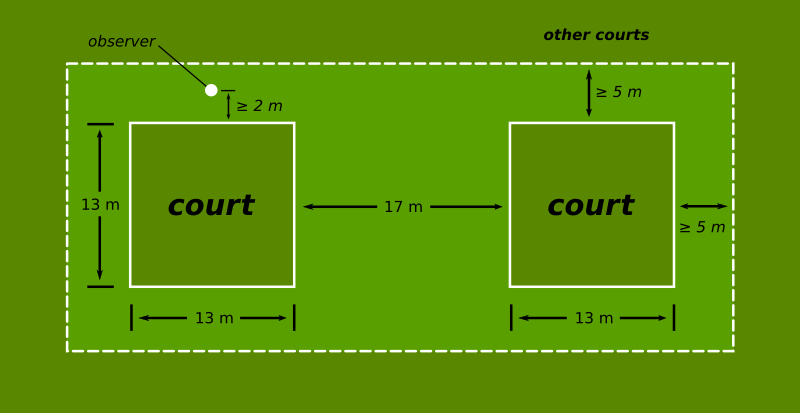
The Double Disc Court field

Double disc court (DDC) invented and introduced by Frisbee Hall of Fame inductee Jim Palmeri of Rochester, NY, is a sport played with two flying discs. Two teams of two players each stand in their own courts. The goal is to defend a court from an attack by the opposing team. Two identical square courts are located on a level playing field of grass measuring 13 meters on a side. The distance between the courts is 17 meters. Attacks are made in two ways: by throwing a disc in play into the opponents' court in an attempt to have the disc come to rest within that court without ever having touched out-of-bounds, or by causing both discs to be touched by a player or players on the opposing team at the same time (called a "double"). A team scores a point whenever they make a successful attack or whenever an opponent throws a disc out-of-bounds. The first team to score the requisite number of points as determined by the competitive format, wins the game.

== Canine Disc ==
Canine Disc (or dog disc) is a dog sport and a disc sport. In canine disc competitions, dogs and their human flying disc throwers compete in events such as distance catching and somewhat choreographed freestyle catching. The sport celebrates the bond between handler and dog, by allowing them to work together.

== Disc games adapted from non-disc games ==
These games originated when the rules of another game were adjusted to use a flying disc in place of a ball.

Game	Description
dodge disc	Variations of dodgeball using a flying disc in place of the ball or balls
Crosbee	adapted from lacrosse, it is in many ways a cross between touch football and ultimate
500	Can also be played with a football or other ball. One player throws the disc to the other players and calls out a number between 0 and 500. The catcher wins that number of points, and the first player to earn 500 is the new thrower.

== Other/unclassified games ==
- Flutterguts — a game used mainly to practice catching flying discs
- Kan-jam - a trademarked variation of horseshoes.
- Polish horseshoes - similar to Fricket, but with one pole on each end, with a bottle upright on top of each one (also known as Beersbee)

== See also ==
- Disc golf
- Ultimate Canada
- Ultimate (sport)
- Disc dog
- Guts (flying disc game)
- Flying disc freestyle
- Ken Westerfield
