= Ken Westerfield =

American frisbee player

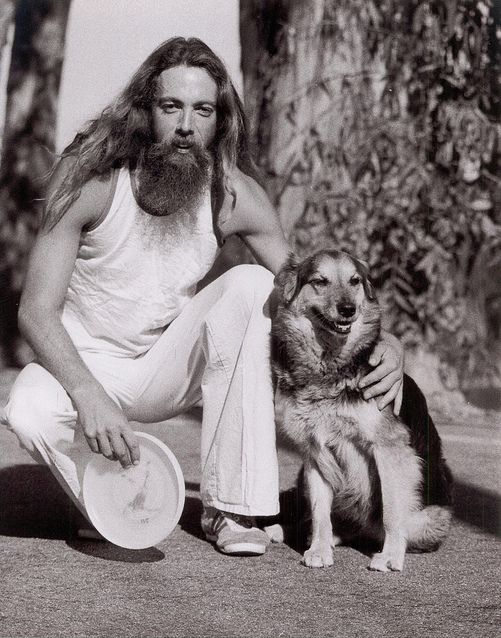
- Westerfield in Santa Cruz, California, 1970s

Personal information
- Full name: Kenneth Ray Westerfield
- Nickname: "Legend"
- Born: Detroit, Michigan, U.S.
- Years active: 1963–1988

Sport
- Country: Canada and the United States
- Sport: Disc sports (Frisbee)
- Events: Freestyle, ultimate, disc golf, double disc court, distance and overall events (TRC, MTA, and accuracy)

Kenneth Ray Westerfield is an American pioneering frisbee disc player, who achieved numerous disc sports accomplishments in the 1970s. A disc sports Hall of Fame inductee in freestyle, ultimate, and disc golf. In addition, he was voted "Top Men's Player" in the 1970–75 Decade Awards. Westerfield produced tournaments, set world records, and won awards in every disc sport. He was a tournament co-director for the Canadian Open Frisbee Championships (1972–1985) in Toronto, the Vancouver Open Frisbee Championships (1974–1977) in Vancouver, BC, the 1978 Santa Cruz Flying Disc Classic in Santa Cruz, California, the 1985 Labatt's World Guts Championships in Toronto, and the 1987 World PDGA Disc Golf Championships in Toronto.

Westerfield founded the first ultimate league in Canada – the Toronto Ultimate Club (1979). As one of the original freestylers from the 1960s, used his expertise in several company-sponsored touring Frisbee shows in the U.S. and Canada. Irwin Toy, (Frisbee distributor in Canada, 1972–76), Molson Frisbee Team (1974–77), Adidas Canada (1974–1979), Goodtimes Professional Frisbee Show (1978–82), Orange Crush Frisbee Team (1977–78), Air Canada Frisbee Team (1978–79), Lee Jeans Frisbee Team (1979–80) and the Labatts Schooner Frisbee Team (1983–85).

== Early life ==
Ken Westerfield was born in Detroit, Michigan, to Margaret Marion (née Beach), a clerical administrator for the public school system, and his father, Gene C. Westerfield, a trade school-trained refrigeration contractor in a family-owned business. Born into a close, middle-class household, Westerfield lived with his parents and younger sister, Kathy, who graduated from Winston Churchill High School in 1972 and made a career in special education. Westerfield's parents were both athletic, and his father schooled him in many different sports. Cleo Conn Westerfield, his grandfather, played baseball for the Detroit Street Railway League in the 1920s. This contributed to Westerfield's early sporting interest. Sports, in the order of interest, along with all disc sports, were baseball, hockey, motorcycles, golf, and basketball, in which he competed in several city leagues.

== Early Frisbee and disc sports career ==
In 1960, at the age of thirteen, Ken Westerfield and Jim Kenner, who later founded Discraft, became best friends. They started playing Frisbee during their high school years. Daily they would experiment with new ways of throwing and catching the Frisbee, this would later be called "playing freestyle." At the time, Frisbee was only considered a toy for recreational purposes, and there was no reason to become skilled in throwing it. There were no Frisbee professionals to look up to or disc sports tournaments to compete in. Their shared anti-establishment attitude and lifestyle, which included their rejection of traditional sports, led them to develop a proficiency in playing Frisbee that had never been seen before.

After graduating from Franklin High School in Livonia, Michigan, in 1965, Westerfield and Kenner spent their summer days at Cass and Silver Lake beaches. They also showcased their Frisbee skills at music festivals. One day, they noticed an event ad in a local alternative newspaper and decided to take their Frisbees and a VW Bug to a music festival called Woodstock in upstate New York, which later became the music event of the century. At the festival, they would throw the Frisbee over the crowd, just out of reach, and watch as people sitting on the ground reached out for it as it flew by. Many of them may not even have known what it was. Westerfield later reflected that it was an interesting crowd to play for.

In 1970, Westerfield and Kenner moved to Toronto, Canada, and established their disc-playing headquarters in Queen's Park. They made a daily routine of playing Frisbee freestyle and object disc golf at the park. The following year, with only a hundred dollars each, bedrolls, and a Frisbee, they hitchhiked across Canada. They stopped along the way to perform Frisbee street shows to audiences in cities and at popular annual events such as the Klondike Days in Edmonton and the Calgary Stampede in Alberta. After completing their cross-country tour in Vancouver, they made their home for the summer in the "All Seasons Park" (tent city), which was founded by the Youth International Party (Yippies) as a protest against the Four Seasons company's plans to build a complex on two blocks adjacent to Stanley Park. Although they were not politically affiliated with the Yippies, Westerfield and Kenner made the protested park their home. They made a minimal income by selling alternative newspapers, the Georgia Straight, on the city streets by day and performing nightly Frisbee shows in the historic Gastown area, in front of a railroad car turn restaurant named Frisby's. Because of the urban settings, their performances were highly surreal, as they freestyled with a frisbee at night in front of crowds in the streets. They bounced the disc off buildings, threw around statues, skipped the frisbee through traffic, and threw over mobs of interested spectators. One night, while performing at Frisby's, they unwittingly became involved in the Yippie-organized Gastown Smoke-in, a demonstration for the legalization of marijuana. The subsequent smoking of marijuana in the town square quickly turned the peaceful but illegal demonstration into the now-famous Gastown Riots. The police also began regular raids of All Seasons Park.

During the fall of 1971, Westerfield and Kenner, having to leave All Seasons Park due to continued police raids, needed money to return to Toronto. They continued to perform at Frisby's and decided to try collecting money like street musicians. It was a success. Upon returning to Toronto, they resided in the notorious counter-cultural Rochdale College, while performing Frisbee shows on the Yonge Street Mall. Nightly, thousands of tourists and Torontonians would enjoy displays of their Frisbee expertise, while attractive accomplices (girlfriends) would use a Frisbee to collect donations. They wanted to add professional legitimacy to their Frisbee show and approached Ed Hurst, promotions manager for Irwin Toy, the Frisbee distributor in Canada. They proposed their show as a way to promote the Frisbee. They scheduled a basketball halftime show at Jarvis Collegiate Institute as a demonstration for Irwin Toy's management. The students loved it, and so did Irwin Toy. They successfully proved that their show would be beneficial in helping the company promote the Frisbee. In 1972, Irwin Toy retained them to perform at special community and sporting events across Canada. Westerfield and Kenner became the world's first full-time professional touring Frisbee players.

== The Canadian Open Frisbee Championships and the beginning of flying disc sports ==
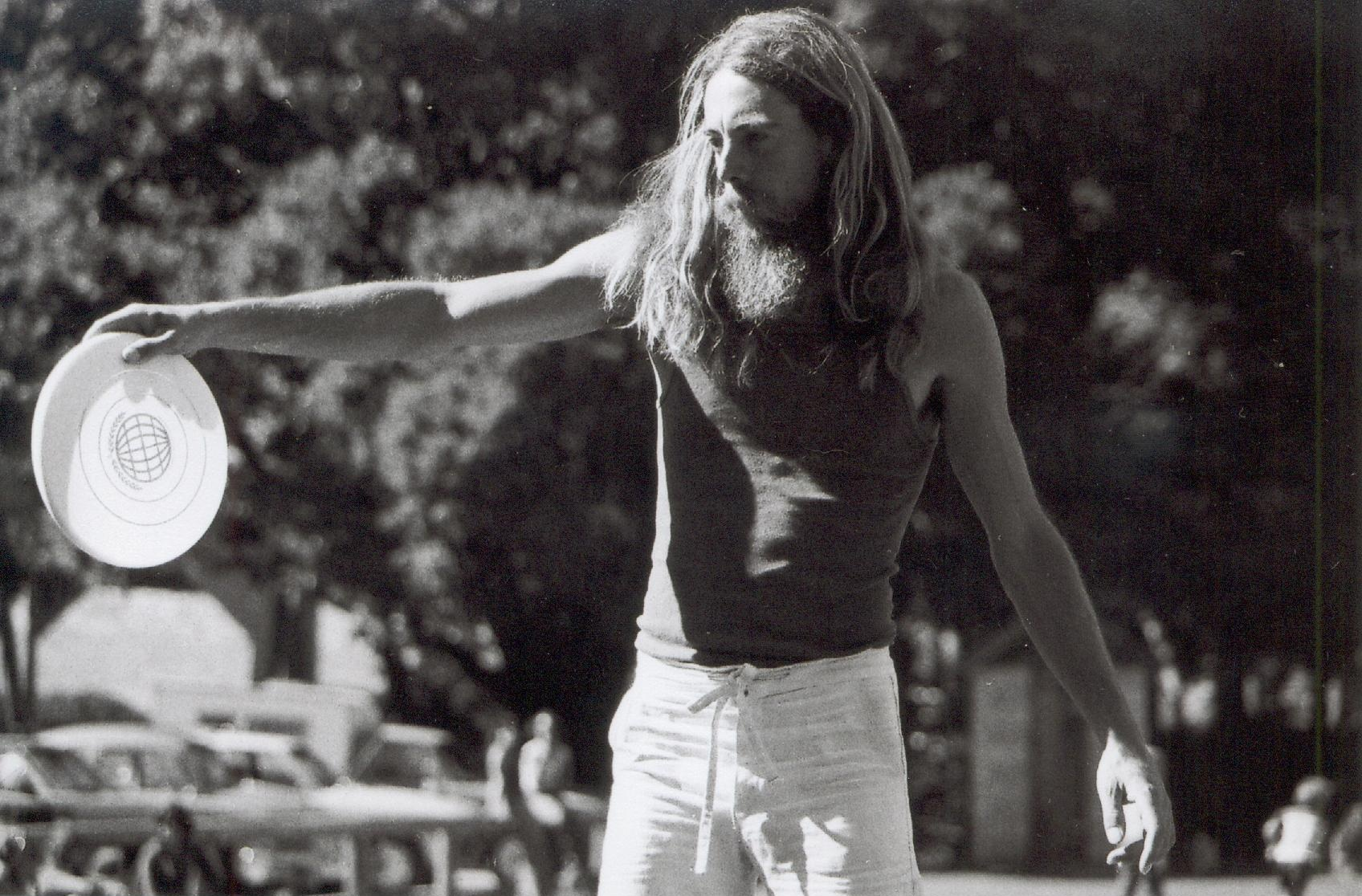
Westerfield helped to popularize Frisbee as an alternative disc sport in the 1960s and 70s. Delaveaga Park, Santa Cruz, CA.

Disc sports originated in the 1970s, and several tournaments played a significant role. These tournaments were the IFT Guts Frisbee competitions held in Northern Michigan, the Canadian Open Frisbee Championships in Toronto (1972), and Vancouver, BC (1974), the Octad in New Brunswick, NJ (1974), the American Flying Disc Open (AFDO) in Rochester, NY (1974) and the WFC in Rose Bowl, Pasadena, CA (1974). Before the events that would transform Frisbees into serious athletic equipment, they were merely considered as toys for recreational purposes. However, Ken Westerfield and Jim Kenner were already recognized as Frisbee athletes who were on par with other professional sports athletes. They joined forces with Andrew Davidson, a professor at Humber College, and Jeff Otis, the event coordinator of the Canadian National Exhibition (CNE), to organize the Canadian Open Frisbee Championships (1972-1985). This competition initially included disc guts and distance events but expanded to include disc golf, freestyle, ultimate, and individual field events at the CNE. In 1975, the tournament was relocated to Toronto Islands. Westerfield and Kenner also founded the Vancouver Open Frisbee Championships (1974-1977). Some of today's techniques and competitive formats can be traced back to these pioneers. The Canadian Open Frisbee Championships and the Vancouver Open Frisbee Championships introduced Frisbee as a disc sport, including the first competitive freestyle events.

Freestyle is a competition where teams of two or three players perform a routine that involves a series of creative throwing and catching techniques set to music. The routine is judged based on its difficulty, execution, and presentation. The team with the highest score is declared the winner. Before the invention of the nail delay in 1975, freestyle play was fast-paced and involved various throwing variations with spinning and leaping stylized catches off the throw. This intense and flowing routine was often compared to martial arts and dance.

In 1973, Westerfield and Kenner added their idea of a Frisbee freestyle competition to the 2nd Canadian Open Frisbee Championships. However, due to a lack of competitors, the freestyle event was canceled. Unknown to them, there were a few Frisbee players in the United States with freestyle interests in Berkeley, New York, Ann Arbor, New Jersey, and Chicago. The following year, newly energized freestylers from these cities gathered in Toronto to compete in this new freestyle event. In 1974, at the 3rd annual Canadian Open Frisbee Championships, Westerfield and Kenner introduced the freestyle event and won it.

The first-ever freestyle competition featured several noteworthy Frisbee pairs, including Doug Corea and Jim Palmeri, John Kirkland and Jose Montalvo, Irv Kalb and Dave "Buddha" Meyers, Dan "Stork" Roddick and Bruce Koger, and Tom Cleworth and John Connelly. Westerfield and Kenner won the competition and became the world's first Freestyle Frisbee Champions. The same year, they organized the second freestyle competition along with other Frisbee events at their Vancouver Open Frisbee Championships, which took place at Kitsilano Beach in Vancouver, British Columbia. This is where Bill King, Jim Brown, and John Anthony made their first competitive appearance and gained early freestyle fame. A year later, the American Flying Disc Open (AFDO) in Rochester, New York, the Octad in New Brunswick, New Jersey, and the 1975 World Frisbee Championships, held at the Rose Bowl in Pasadena, California, adopted Westerfield and Kenner's freestyle competition format as one of their new events. Today, this freestyle event is one of the premier events in flying disc tournaments worldwide. Jim Kenner and Ken received The Decade Awards 1970-75 Top Freestyle Routine: Canadian Open 1974. They were also inducted into the Inaugural Pioneer Class of the FPA Freestyle Disc Hall of Fame.

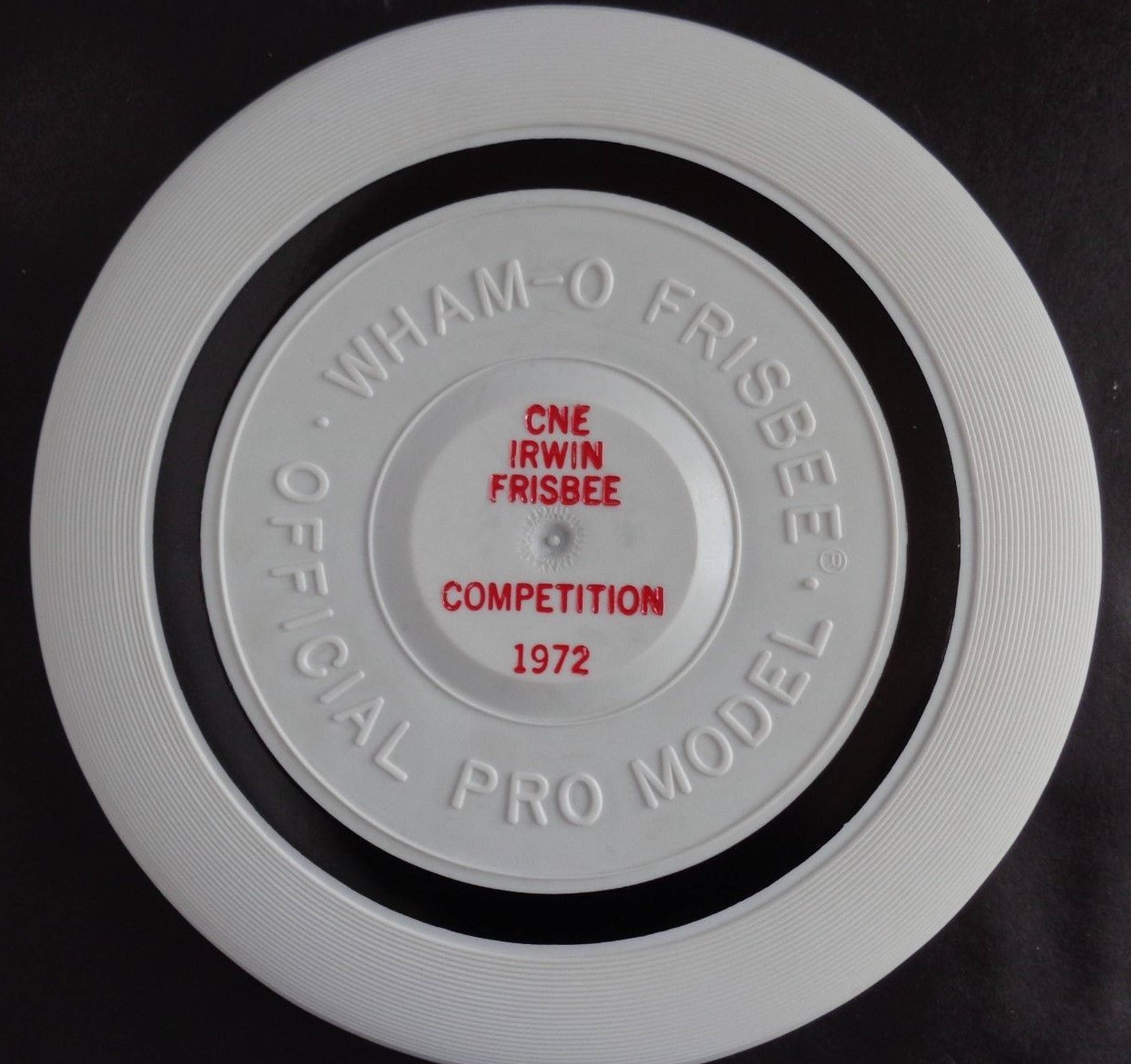
The first Frisbee ever designed with a disc sport tournament identification. The 1972 Canadian Open Frisbee Championships, Toronto. Canada. Sponsored by Irwin (Canadian Frisbee distributor) and held at the Canadian National Exhibition (CNE).

In 1974, Westerfield and Kenner approached Molson Breweries with the idea of performing Frisbee shows at basketball halftimes in Canadian universities as the Molson Frisbee Team. Always looking for unique ways to get into the university market, they accepted their proposal and were more than impressed with the results. The following year, Molson's up the promotional fee and used their show exclusively to introduce a new brand of beer called Molson Diamond.

In 1975, with Molson's sponsorship, Westerfield and Kenner moved the Canadian Open Frisbee Championships from the Canadian National Exhibition to Toronto Islands. Molson's would continue to sponsor their Frisbee shows and events for several years. Along with promoting Molson products, this would help Westerfield and Kenner to promote their new sport everywhere.

== Competitive years in disc sports, 1974–79 ==
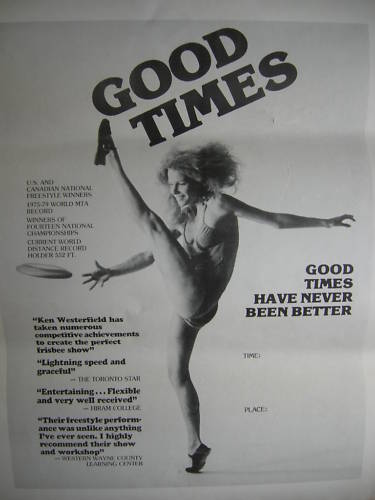
A poster from the Good Times Professional Frisbee Show, performing Frisbee shows with Women's Freestyle Champion Mary Kathron, 1978–1982

Frisbee (disc) tournaments were beginning to attract excellent disc competitors from everywhere. What was once a top-selling toy from Wham-O, was becoming a serious competitive sport. Being 27 years old in 1974 (the first year of disc freestyle and overall competitions) Westerfield's competitive participation only spanned five years, but in that short time had wins in every disc sport. What attracted Westerfield to playing with a Frisbee and developing his freestyle play in the sixties, is that he found that it didn't have to be competitive to be athletically challenging. Westerfield co-created and won the first freestyle competition and between 1976 and 1978 competed in North American Series (NAS) competitions to qualify for competing in the annual World Frisbee Championships (WFC), won six U.S. national freestyle titles including both 1976 Eastern and Western national freestyle titles and appeared in fifteen additional freestyle finals. When other sports like disc golf, ultimate, double disc court, and overall events were introduced to the Frisbee scene in the early 1970s, Westerfield quickly excelled in these new events because many of the skills involved in these new disc sports were skills that would transfer from his freestyle play. Westerfield having a dual Canadian/U.S. legal living status, considering Toronto to be his home, always competed for Canada at U.S. and World competitions.

In 1975, at the Canadian Open Frisbee Championships in Toronto, Westerfield set the maximum time aloft (MTA) world record with a sidearm throw of 15 seconds, using a Super Pro Model Frisbee, beating the old record of 11 seconds. Also in 1975, Westerfield invented a new freestyle move called "body-roll" (rolling the disc across outstretched arms and chest, or back), then presented the move in a freestyle event at a national tournament in Rochester, NY called the American Flying Disc Open (AFDO). The hottest move of the day was called the "Canadian mind blower". Westerfield would roll the Frisbee across outstretched arms and chest, to outstretched arms across the back (front to back-roll). Today body-rolls (rolls) are an integral part of every freestyle routine.

In 1974, Wham-O sponsored the first World Frisbee Championships (WFC) which included the North American Series (NAS) Frisbee tournaments held across the U.S. and Canada. These competitions were held to qualify competitors to compete annually in the WFC at the Rose Bowl in Pasadena, California. Winning numerous North American Series (NAS) freestyle and individual events, Westerfield was awarded The Decade Awards for the "Best Player of the Decade" 1970–75.

At a North American Series (NAS) Frisbee tournament in Dallas, Texas, Westerfield became a member of the "400 club" with a prelim distance sidearm throw (also known as forehand), and won the event with a throw of 378 feet, using a 119-gram World Class Model Frisbee. Only two competitors have officially ever thrown over 400 feet in competition with a 119-gram Frisbee (Lightweight disc by today's standard).

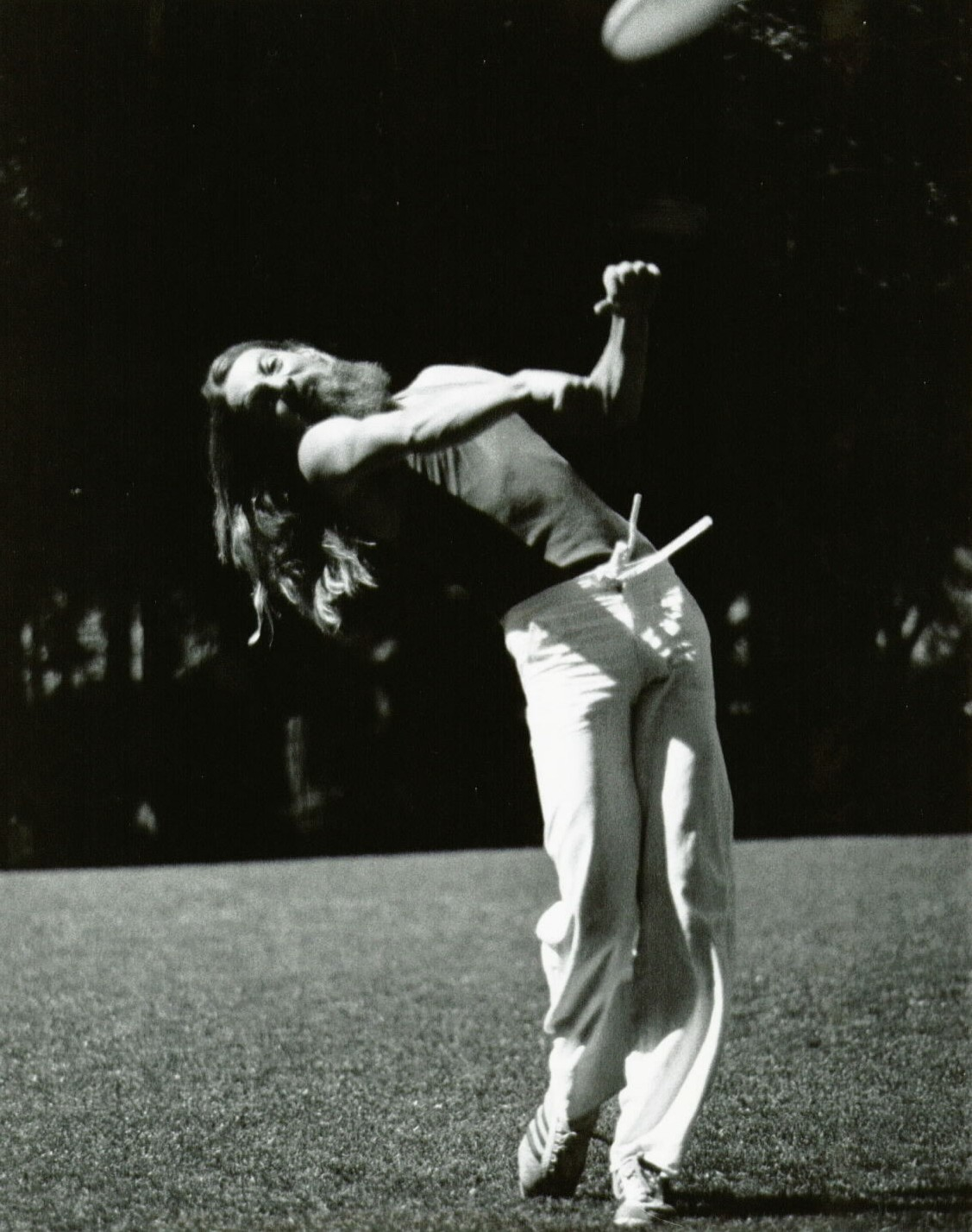
Ken Westerfield sidearm distance throwing record 552' Boulder, Colorado, 1978

In 1978, Boulder, Colorado, while doing a distance throwing demonstration at a North American Series (NAS) event, Westerfield threw a 119-gram World Class Model Frisbee, 552 feet, using his characteristic sidearm throw, beating the official world distance record of 412 feet.

This is how Kevin (Skippy) Givens, World Freestyle Champion, remembers it:

Someone paced off the distance to a building at around 500 feet. Dave Johnson,(former distance world record holder) and others we're trying to hit it. Finally, Dave hits the building and the crowd goes wild. Ken Westerfield was sitting and watching. After Dave hit the building the crowd started to yell for Ken to throw. At first, Ken was dismissive, not interested. Finally, Ken stood up, went to the line, sized up the task then let it fly. It landed in the parking lot past the building on his first throw with no warm-up. The crowd went crazy. It was the most incredible throw I'd ever seen.

Tournament officials marked and measured the throw at 552 feet and until 2014, was the longest distance toss for a sidearm (forehand) throw. Since new manufacturers have introduced heavyweight, beveled edge golf discs and new record attempts are in the high desert winds of Primm, NV, the world distance record is now just over 600 feet for the forehand (sidearm) throw. Westerfield's 552-foot throw is still the longest measured distance toss for a Wham-O brand Frisbee disc.

In 1977, Kenner relocated to London, Ontario, and established a disc manufacturing company called Discraft. Meanwhile, Westerfield went to Santa Cruz, California, and teamed up with Tom Schot, to organize Frisbee events in Northern California, including 1978 Santa Cruz Flying Disc Classic. During his stay in Santa Cruz, Westerfield played in one of the first organized ultimate leagues in the U.S. called the Northern California Ultimate Frisbee League (NCUFL, 1977-1979). The league consisted of teams from over a dozen cities in Northern California. Westerfield also developed a Frisbee Show called Good Times Professional Frisbee Show, which featured freestyle champion Mary Kathron, and later World Freestyle Champion Brian McElwain. Westerfield and his touring team performed shows at universities, fairs, music festivals and professional sporting events across the US and Canada for some of America's largest companies, Labatt Brewing Company, Air Canada, Lee Jeans, Orange Crush and Adidas.

== Disc golf ==
As of 2017, there are over 7000 disc golf courses. Before 1975 and the invention of the disc golf target called the Disc Pole Hole, there were only a few mapped disc golf "object" courses in the U.S. and Canada. In 1970, you could count the number of designed courses, using the Frisbee to play golf and designated objects as holes, on one hand, Rochester, NY, Berkeley, CA, and Toronto, ON, were disc golf's first designed courses, all completely unaware of the existence of the other.

In Canada, beginning in 1970, before even the idea of disc sports and disc golf, Ken Westerfield and Jim Kenner, played Frisbee golf daily on an 18 object hole course they designed at Queen's Park in downtown Toronto. They also added disc golf to their other tournament events at the Canadian Open Frisbee Championships on Toronto Islands and the Vancouver Open Frisbee Championships, in Vancouver, BC. These were the first disc golf tournaments in Canada, beginning with using objects as holes and then permanently placing disc pole holes.

After retiring from disc golf competition in 1979, Ken Westerfield continued to promote disc sports in Canada, specifically in developing an ultimate league in Toronto. Since the Official PDGA disc golf national tour did not launch until 1982, Westerfield never competed in nor applied for a PDGA membership. In 1987, the Canadian Disc Golf Association and PDGA approached Westerfield to produce, and tournament direct the PDGA World Disc Golf Championships in Toronto. With sponsors Orange Crush, Roots, and Irwin Group, Ken Westerfield and Bob Blakely, director of the Canadian Disc Golf Association, organized the event successfully, marking the first time the championship had been held outside the United States. In recognition of the event and his contributions, Westerfield was made an honorary PDGA Member #3248 in 1987, the same year Westerfield retired from his 25-year career in Frisbee and disc sports. He was inducted into the World Disc Golf Hall of Fame.

== Ultimate Frisbee ==
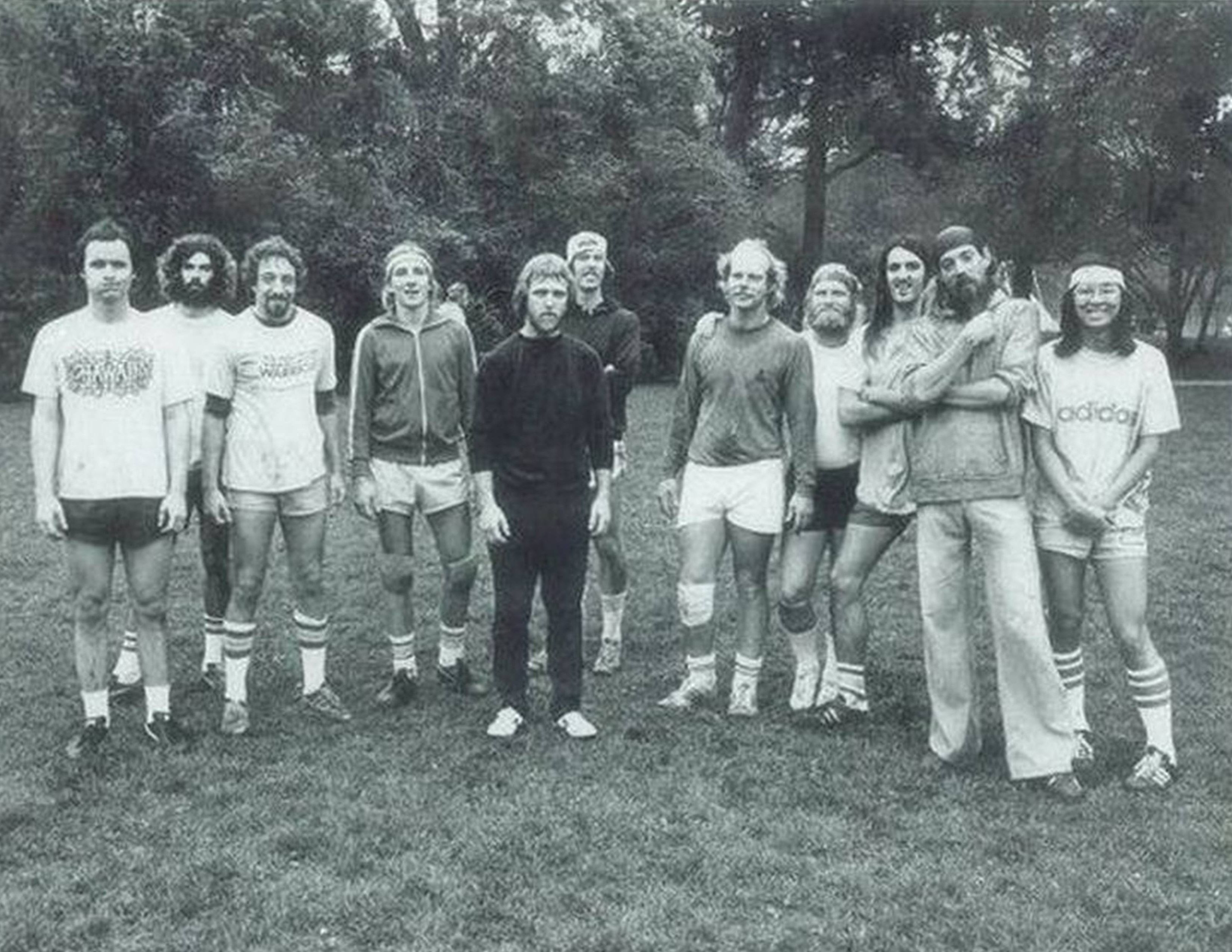
Good Times Ultimate Team. Westerfield (second from right). Good friend and disc sports promoter Tom Schot (fifth from the right) in the Northern California Ultimate Frisbee League, Santa Cruz, CA, 1978.

Ultimate is a team sport played with a flying disc on a rectangular field, 120 yards (110m) by 40 yards (37m). The sport's objective is to pass the disc down the field to team members. Points are awarded when completing a final pass to a team member in the opposing team's end zone. The opposing team, called defense, will try to interrupt their scoring mission. Ultimate comes with a self-regulated rule of playing conduct called the Spirit of the Game. "A player's conduct as a competitor is as important as winning the game," Ken Westerfield brought this unique competitive spirit to all of his disc sports, including ultimate. This spirit was not invented by any one person or group but was recognized as the way these early alternative athletes competed. The tradition of this spirit in disc sports has been carried on to this day. Ultimate was the first disc sport to recognize this unique conduct of play and named it the Spirit of the Game (SOTG). In 1978, it was added to the 7th edition of the rules for ultimate.

Beginning in 1975, the Canadian Open Frisbee Championships, held on Toronto Islands, began introducing disc ultimate to Canadians. Westerfield played in these beginning ultimate Frisbee exhibition games with some of the early promoters of the sport, Johnny Appleseeds who were also there to compete in the other events at the Canadian Open competition. Westerfield continued to play ultimate through the 1970s, mostly while competing at U.S. over-all NAS tournaments and also played on Santa Cruz's first ultimate team called Good Times (a Santa Cruz weekly newspaper) in the first two years of the Northern California Ultimate Frisbee League (NCUFL), 1977–1979.

In 1979, Westerfield retired from competing in national freestyle, disc golf, and overall competitions in the U.S. and Canada. He continued to organize and produce local disc events in Toronto. Westerfield had a passion for ultimate, and with the help of Bob Blakely and Chris Lowcock, he created the Toronto Ultimate League. Westerfield initiated weekly ultimate pick-up games on Kew Beach, then sent invitations to form teams from Wards Island, West Toronto, North Toronto, and his team Beaches. These were the first four teams with each team taking turns hosting Wednesdays weekly league game nights at their home locations. The league starting night was at Kew Beach. Westerfield, using Bob Blakely's office copy machine and mailing facility at Irwin Toy, would produce a weekly newsletter highlighting the games and scores for each team as well as their league standings through the playing season. The Toronto Ultimate League developed and was renamed the Toronto Ultimate Club (TUC), which now has 3,300 active members and over 250 teams playing the year round. This was the first ultimate league in Canada and is now one of the world's oldest.

In 1987, at the Canadian Ultimate Championships (CUC), Ottawa, Westerfield, with his team Darkside, won Canada's first national ultimate championships. In the 1980s, at the beginning of Toronto's competitive ultimate years, Westerfield's contributions to his teams were his expert handling skills as well as the strength of his sidearm (forehand) huck, hammer, and pulls (the starting throw that begins the play, similar to a kickoff in football). Consistently pulling (throwing) deep into the opposing team's end-zone, would always give his team plenty of time to get set-up on defense.

In 2013, as a founding partner, the Toronto Ultimate Club presented Canada's first semi-professional ultimate team, the Toronto Rush, They went undefeated 18–0 for the season, and won the AUDL Championships.

In 2010, Ken Westerfield was inducted into the inaugural class of the Toronto Ultimate Club Hall of Fame. In 2011, Westerfield was also inducted into the inaugural class of the Ultimate Canada Hall of Fame.

== Disc sports legacy ==
As with many discoveries, disc sports were created in part due to an unintended consequence. What began as Westerfield's and others' rebellion against social norms and a rejection of what was considered the sports establishment, eventually would work in cooperation with "establishment" Frisbee manufacturers to promote sales. Disc sports have become one of today's fastest-growing sports. Westerfield's participation in the beginning of the Frisbee and disc sports development years followed what was little more than a daily display of his counterculture activity and lifestyle. Ken Westerfield is recognized for his athletic achievements, and for his contributions as a pioneer, innovator, and organizer for all disc sports. From numerous shows and demonstrations, as one of the first professional touring Frisbee players, he has made contributions to disc sports, introducing some of the first Frisbee disc sport competitions and organizations in Canada and the U.S. that are still active today.

Freestyle and freestyle competitions are played in countries around the world, with organizing efforts of the FPA. Ultimate has also gained immense popularity, with over 1.48 million regular players in Canada and the US alone. Competitions are sanctioned by Ultimate Canada and USA Ultimate, including a semi-professional ultimate tour, called the AUDL. Disc golf is played on over 7000 courses in about 40 countries with 500,000 regular players, including a semi-professional tour, set-up by the PDGA.

What began as Ken Westerfield's daily counterculture pastime in the 1960s became his storied legacy in disc sports, as well as ironically becoming an "establishment" sport, using the flying disc.

After retiring from playing and promoting disc sports in 1988, Westerfield went on to several businesses. Importing exotic plants from South America, (1988–1992). Operating a popular biker-themed rock and roll bar in downtown Toronto called the Rats Ass Saloon, (1990–1993). A motorcycle shop in West Toronto called Rockerbox Motorcycle Maintenance and Restoration, (1994–1997). In the 1990s, although never wearing a motorcycle club patch himself, Westerfield associated with Bikers and occasionally rode with local club members that were considered to be the 1% of patch-wearing motorcycle clubs in Toronto. Today Westerfield, mostly retired, spends his time in Bisbee, Arizona, a small town near the U.S. Mexican border. He has always had a passion for helping animals and volunteers much of his time working with several animal rescue organizations.

== Awards, achievements, and event timeline ==
Ken Westerfield and Jim Kenner disc sports and career events.

- 1960 – Westerfield and Jim Kenner, at age thirteen, become friends.
- 1963–1965 – Westerfield and Kenner begin their free-form style of Frisbee play summer days at Silver lake and Cass Lake beaches through their high school years in Michigan.
- 1965–1969 – Played Frisbee freestyle to crowds, while at various outdoor rock concerts and music festivals including Woodstock.
- 1970 – Westerfield and Kenner move from Michigan to Toronto, Ontario, Canada. Play Frisbee freestyle and disc golf daily, in Queen's Park. This was one of the earliest designed object disc golf courses, along with Rochester, NY, and Berkeley, CA also designed in 1970.
- 1971 – Hitchhiking across Canada, performed unsponsored improv Frisbee street shows with Kenner in cities along the way, including a summer of Frisbee shows in the historic area of Gastown, in Vancouver, British Columbia.
- 1971 – Involved in the Vancouver Gastown Riots while doing Frisbee shows that same night in the streets of Gastown.
- 1971–1974 – Living in the highly publicized notorious counter-cultural Rochdale College they performed nightly Frisbee shows on the Yonge Street Mall in Toronto, Ontario.
- 1972–1976 – As the Canadian Frisbee Champions, Westerfield and Kenner, were contracted by Irwin Toy, the Frisbee manufacturer in Canada, to perform Frisbee shows at special events across Canada.
- 1972–1985 – The Canadian Open Frisbee Championships, Toronto (co-produced and was tournament director with Jim Kenner). Beginning as a guts and distance tournament, later adding freestyle, disc golf, ultimate, and overall individual field events. The Canadian Open and the Vancouver Open were the introduction of disc sports (up until then, the Frisbee was always considered a toy).
- 1973 – Planned to introduce the first freestyle competition event at the 2nd annual Canadian Open Frisbee Championships in Toronto, but due to a lack of competitors, canceled the event. Wham-O in the U.S. sent Victor Malafronte and Jo Cahow to see this new freestyle event. It was the first time Westerfield and Kenner would see other highly skilled freestylers.
- 1974 – Westerfield and Kenner introduce and win the first freestyle competition at the Canadian Open Frisbee Championships, Toronto, Ontario, Canada.

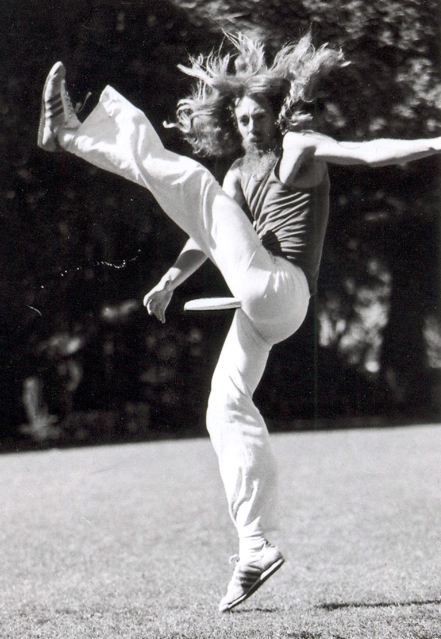
1970-1975 Best Men's Player and Best Freestyle Routine, the Decade Awards

- 1974 – The Decade Awards 1970–1975, Awarded "Best Freestyle Routine", The 1974 Canadian Open, Ken Westerfield/Jim Kenner.
- 1974–1979 – Clothing sponsored by Adidas Canada
- 1974–1977 – Molson Frisbee Team, performing Frisbee freestyle shows with Jim Kenner at special events and Canadian universities in Ontario.
- 1974–1977 – Westerfield and Kenner produced Western Canada's first Frisbee (disc sports) competitions. The Vancouver Open Frisbee Championships at Kitsilano Beach and a Wham-O/Irwin sponsored North American Series (NAS) Tournament in Stanley Park, Vancouver, British Columbia, Canada.
- 1975 – World MTA Record 15 seconds, Canadian Open Frisbee Championships, Toronto, Ontario, Canada.
- 1975 – Voted Best Men's Player, Ken Westerfield, The Decade Awards 1970-1975.
- 1975 – The Canadian Open Frisbee Championships introduces ultimate. Westerfield played in these beginning exhibitions along with some of the sports founders (Johnny Appleseeds) from Columbia High School (CHS), Maplewood, New Jersey.

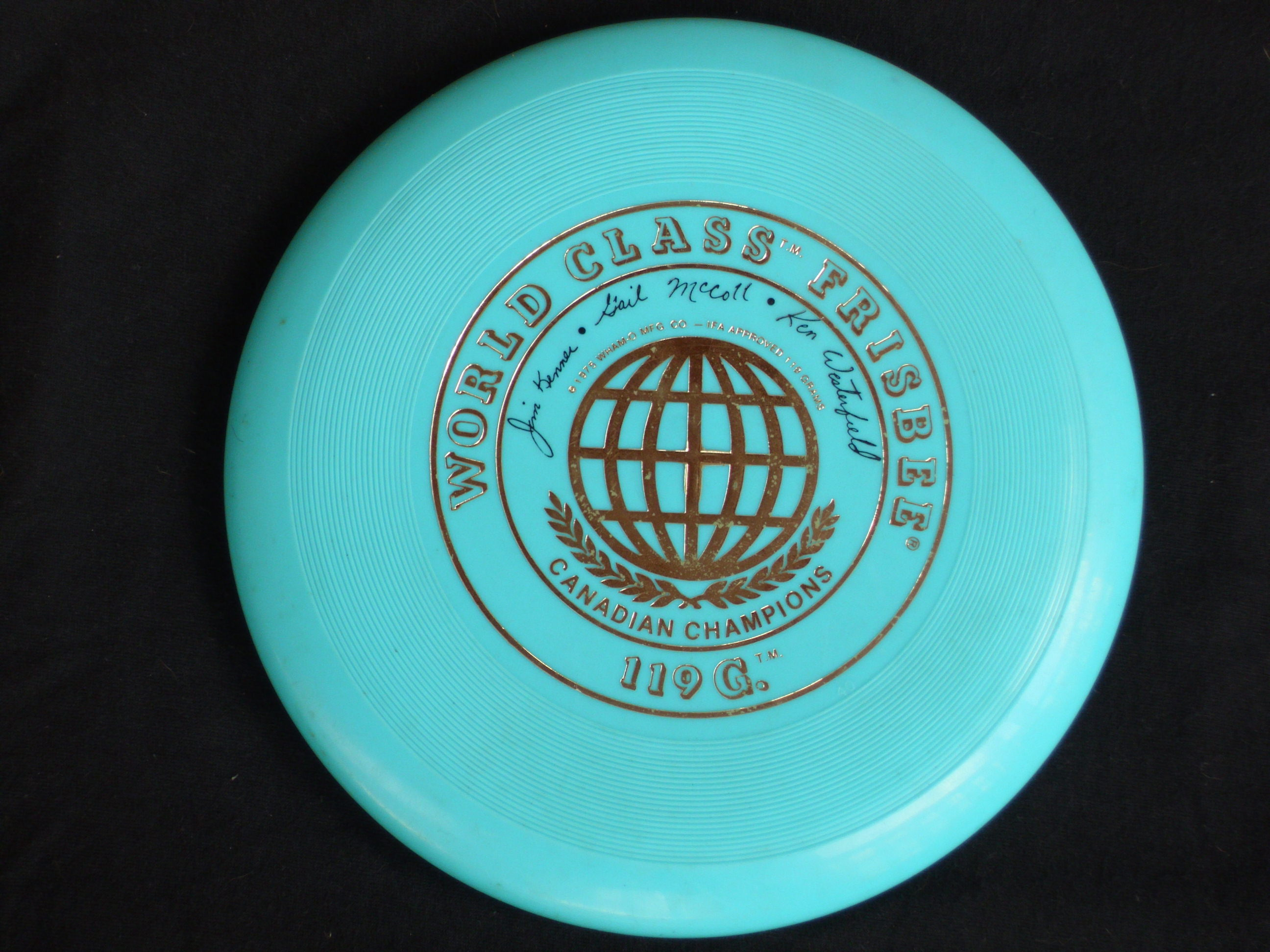
1975-1977 World Class Frisbee signatures Jim Kenner, Gail McColl, Ken Westerfield, collectively, have ten Disc Sport Hall of Fame inductions.

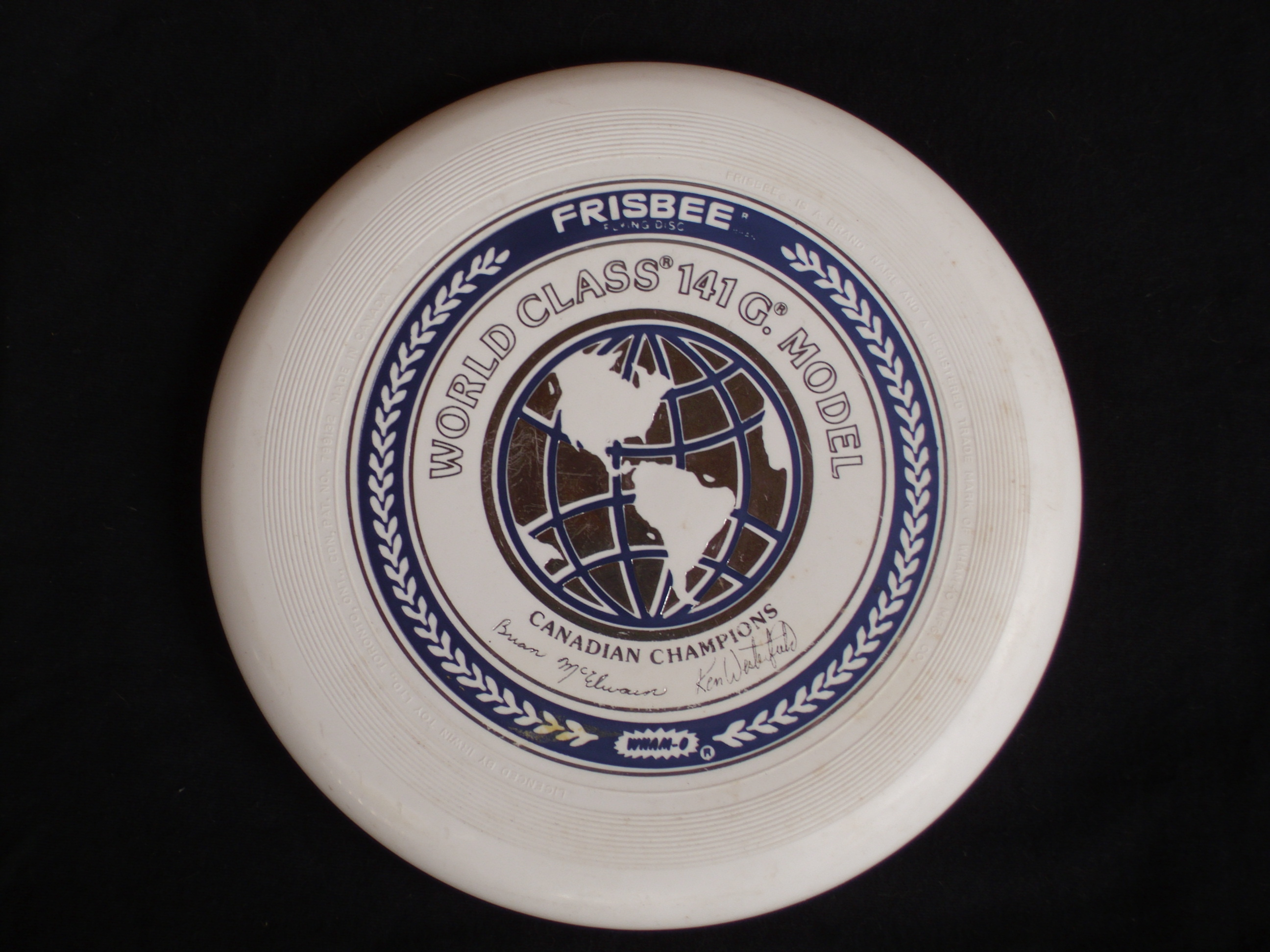
1978 World Class Frisbee signatures Brian McElwian and Ken Westerfield

- 1975 – Introduced a new freestyle move called a "body-roll" (rolling the disc across outstretched arms and chest or back), at the American Flying Disc Open (AFDO), in Rochester, New York.
- 1975–1978 – Signature endorsing the Canadian World Class Frisbee.
- 1976 – Presents the first disc golf tournaments in Canada, first as an object course, then using disc pole holes with chains and baskets. Canadian Open Frisbee Championships on Toronto Islands and the Vancouver Open Frisbee Championships, Vancouver, BC ( 1977, Wham-O, NAS event in Stanley Park using natural objects).
- 1976 – Vancouver BC, appearing on the Peter Gzowski television show along with Greenpeace activist/founder David McTaggart. The next day was invited by Mctaggart to do a Frisbee show at a Greenpeace rally/protest on Kitsilano Beach in Vancouver.
- 1976–1978 – Winning 15 first-place titles in only 10 North American Series (NAS) National Frisbee Championships in disc golf, distance, and individual overall events, including 6 U.S. national freestyle titles.
- 1977 – Westerfield goes to Santa Cruz, CA, and helps Tom Schot organize Frisbee events in Northern California. Kenner and Gail McColl moved to London, Ontario to start a disc manufacturing company called Discraft which is today's largest disc sport company that supplies flying discs and accessories for every disc sport.
- 1977–1979 – Westerfield played disc ultimate through the 1970s mostly while competing in U.S. overall North American Series (NAS) tournaments and played on the Santa Cruz Good Times Ultimate Team (sponsored by the Good Times newspaper), in the first two years in the Northern California Ultimate Frisbee League.
- 1977 – Design and manufactured a flying disc with Tom Schot. Disc is introduced at the 1978 Santa Cruz Flying Disc Classic. The disc is later retooled and manufactured by Brand-X.
- 1977–1978 – Orange Crush Frisbee Team, touring Canada doing Frisbee shows with Mary Kathron, Women's Freestyle Champion.
- 1978–1979 – Air Canada Frisbee Team, doing Frisbee shows across Canada with Mary Kathron.

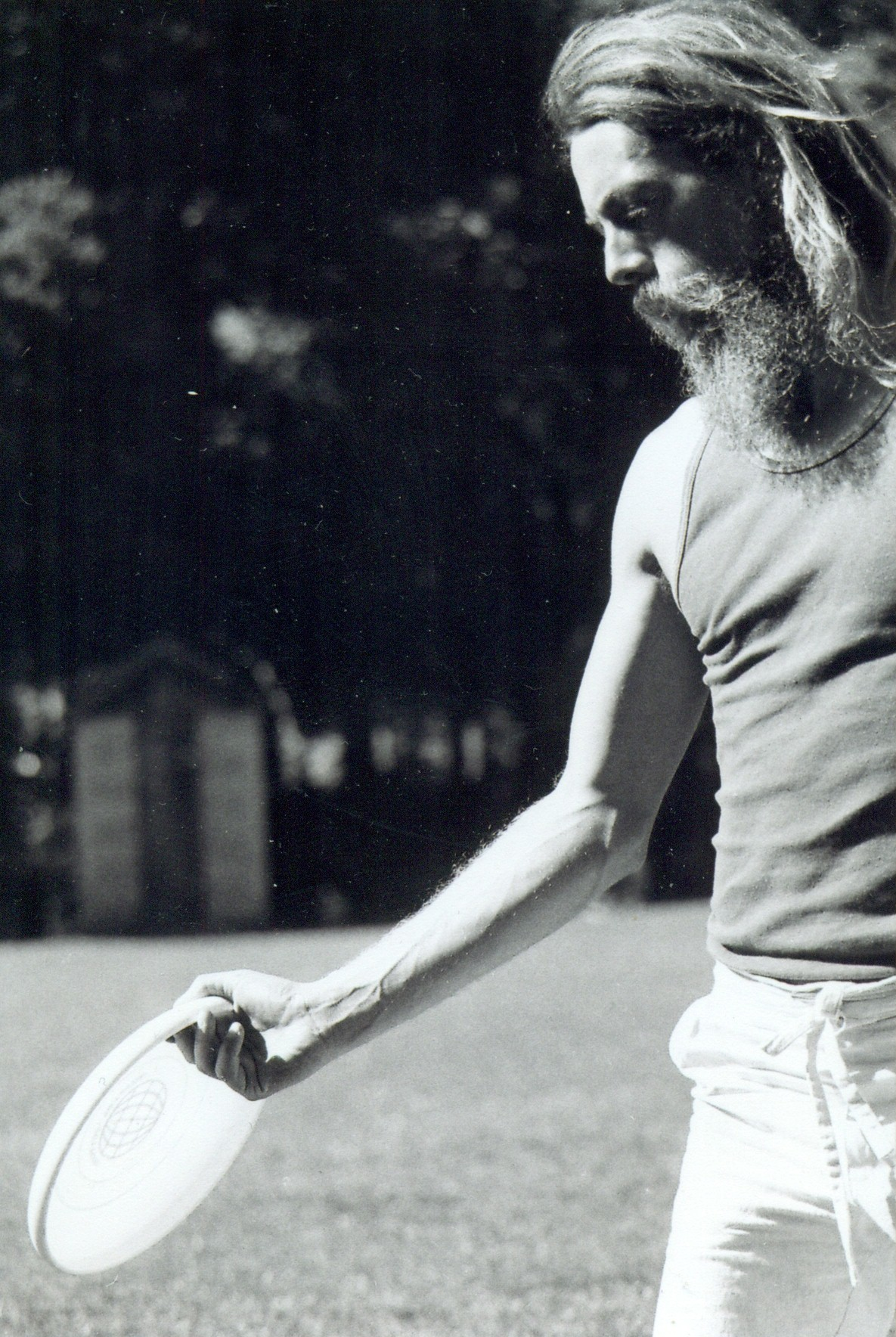
Westerfield demonstrating his sidearm throwing style, the 1970s

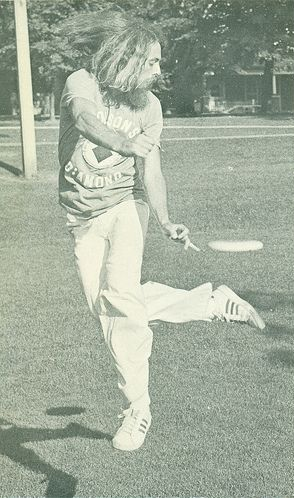
Ken Westerfield performing Frisbee shows for various companies, Irwin Toy, Molson's Breweries, Lee Jeans, Orange Crush, Air Canada, Adidas and Labatt's Breweries at universities, sporting and special events in the U.S. and Canada, 1972-1987

- 1978 – At a North American Series (NAS) tournament in Dallas, Texas, became a member of the exclusive "400 Club" with a prelim sidearm throw, and won the event with a throw of 378 feet. Only two competitors had ever thrown a 119-gram Frisbee over 400 feet in competition.
- 1978 – In Boulder, Colorado, during a distance demonstration at an (NAS) Frisbee tournament, Ken threw a forehand (sidearm) 119-gram Frisbee 552 feet. This distance record is still the longest distance toss for a Wham-O Frisbee disc.
- 1978 – Santa Cruz Flying Disc Classic, Santa Cruz, California (co-produced and was tournament director with Tom Schot).
- 1978–1982 – Good Times Professional Frisbee Show, performing shows with Women's Freestyle Champion Mary Kathron at universities, sporting events, and music festivals across Canada and the U.S.
- 1979 – Featured in a Wham-O film, "The 1979 World Frisbee Golf Championship" WFC Disc Golf final round. Not shown in the film, the championship ended in a sudden death play-off between Westerfield and Snapper Pierson.
- 1979–1980 – Lee Jeans Frisbee Team, freestyle shows in shopping malls and at special events with Mary Kathron.
- 1979 – Started the Toronto Ultimate League (Club). This was the first disc ultimate league in Canada and one of the world's oldest leagues. Canada is considered a powerhouse in world disc ultimate and has been ranked number one several times in the world ultimate rankings according to the World Flying Disc Federation.
- 1979 – Retires from competing in U.S. and Canadian national (NAS) freestyle and overall competitions. Continued to organize local disc events in Toronto, as well as playing league and touring team ultimate, Toronto's Zero Tolerance, and Darkside (1987 CUC National Champions).
- 1983–1985 – Labatt's Schooner Frisbee Team, performing freestyle shows at special events in Canada with Brian McElwain, Patrick Chartrand, and Peter Turcaj.
- 1985 – World Labatt's Guts Championships, Toronto, Ontario, Canada (co-produced and was tournament director with Peter Turcaj).
- 1987 – World Disc Golf Championships (PDGA), Toronto, Ontario, Canada (produced and was tournament director). This is the only time this annual championship has been played outside of the U.S.
- 1987 – National Champion on Toronto team Darkside. Canadian Ultimate Championships (CUC), Ottawa, Ontario, Canada.
- 1988 – At age 40, retires from playing ultimate and organizing disc sports tournaments. As recently as 2010 has returned to collaborate on historical and performance disc sports articles and occasionally has shown up as a spectator at various disc events.
- 2010 – Inducted into the Inaugural Class of the Toronto Ultimate Club Hall of Fame.
- 2011 – Inducted into the Inaugural Class of the Ultimate Canada Hall of Fame.
- 2012 – Featured in a flying disc film documentary called The Invisible String, made by a Berlin film group in Germany.
- 2013 – Inducted into the World Disc Golf Hall of Fame.
- 2013 – 34 years after playing the first league games on Kew Beach (1979), the Toronto Ultimate Club, as a founding partner, presented Canada's first semi-professional ultimate team, the Toronto Rush, to the American Ultimate Disc League.
- 2014 – Beaches Team - Special Merit - inducted into the Toronto Ultimate Club Hall of Fame (Ken's first team in Toronto ultimate 1979).
- 2016 – Inducted into the Inaugural Pioneer Class of the FPA Freestyle Disc Hall of Fame.

== See also ==
- Disc golf
- Flying disc freestyle
- Ultimate (sport)

== Newspaper articles ==
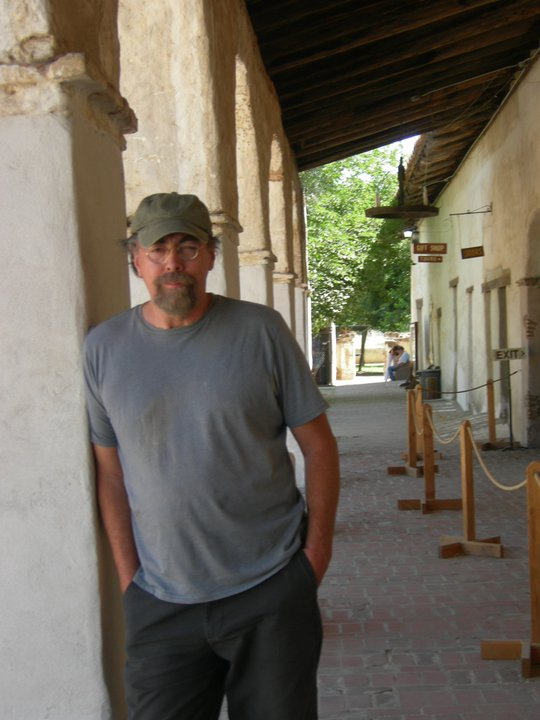
Ken Westerfield at the Mission San Miguel Arcángel, San Miguel, CA, 2009

- Sarasota Herald-Tribune - May 21, 1978
- Florence Times Daily June 6, 1976
- The Leader-Post - Jul 14, 1976
- The Calgary Herald - Aug 11, 1979
- The Leader-Post - Aug 4, 1979

== Books about Frisbee and disc sports ==
- Danna, Mark, and Poynter, Dan; Frisbee Players' Handbook, Parachuting Publications, Santa Barbara, California (1978); ISBN 0-915516-19-5
- Horowitz, Judy, and Bloom, Billy; Frisbee: More Than A Game of Catch, Leisure Press, Champaign, Illinois (1984); ISBN 978-0-88011-105-8
- Leonardo, Tony and Zagoria, Adam co-authored "Ultimate: The First Four Decades," publ. by Ultimate History, Inc., 2005, ISBN 0-9764496-0-9
- Morrison, Fred & Kennedy, Phil; Flat Flip Flies Straight! True Origins of the Frisbee, Wormhole Publishers, Wethersfield, CT (January 2006); ISBN 0-9774517-4-7
- Norton, Gary; The Official Frisbee Handbook, Bantam Books, Toronto/New York/London (July 1972); no ISBN
- Palmeri, Jim & Kennedy, Phil; A Chain of Events, The Origin & Evolution of Disc Golf Paperback, Unabridged (2015); ISBN 978-0-9774517-0-8
- Stancil, E. D., and Johnson, M. D.; Frisbee, A Practitioner's Manual, and Definitive Treatise, Workman Publishing Company, New York (July 1975); ISBN 978-0-911104-53-0
- Tips, Charles; Frisbee by the Masters, Celestial Arts, Millbrae, California (March 1977); ISBN 978-0-89087-142-3
- Tips, Charles, and Roddick, Dan; Frisbee Sports & Games, Celestial Arts, Millbrae, California (March 1979); ISBN 978-0-89087-233-8
