= Flying gyroscope =

A flying gyroscope (also known as a flying cylinder or flying tube) is a cylindrical wing or annular airfoil. It is thrown like a football, and can fly very far. The William Mark Corporation invented their flying gyroscope, X-Zylo, in 1993. It was invented by Mark Forti, a Baylor University student, and refined within the aerospace industry. In 1994, X-Zylo unofficially broke the existing world flying disc distance record when it was thrown 655 feet (200 m).

A book from MIT tells how the X-Zylo actually works: What Makes the Amazing X-Zylo Fly?: Tarr, David Landon: 9780982114834: Amazon.com: Books

"Toobee, The Amazing Flying Can" is a flying gyroscope developed in 1978. It resembles the top third of an aluminum soda can.

A simple flying gyroscope can be folded from a sheet of paper.

== See also ==
- Boomerang
- Flying disc
- Flying ring
