= 500 (ball game) =

Children's ball game

500, also known as Jackpot, or also known as Flyers, is a non-codified ball game for children. It is played by one participant throwing a ball, and others catching it for points.

== Rules ==
The players include a thrower and many catchers. The thrower will decide if points will be awarded if the ball is caught directly ('alive'), if the ball must be picked up after it hits the ground ('dead'), or either. The thrower also has the responsibility to determine the number of points that should be distributed. For example, a thrower calls out, "100, dead!" and throws the ball straight up in the air. All the catchers must wait until the ball touches the ground before they pick it up in order to receive the 100 points at stake. If a catcher's score goes over 500 (or in different variations of the game, 1,000), that person will revert to 0 and will become the thrower, and the thrower will in turn become a catcher.

== Variations ==
The game can be played using a frisbee instead of the ball.

Mystery Ball (also known as mystery box) is a variation based on the same premise, but along with calling out a number of points, the thrower has the ability to instead call out "mystery ball/mystery box." Once a player has the ball, the thrower says what the mystery ball/mystery box was worth, being an unknown (to everyone but the thrower) number of points. One must trust the thrower that they did not change this preset number of points after seeing who ended up with the ball, or have the thrower look away so that there is no way to see who has the ball, so that they cannot favor any player.

- Negative Points: To make the mystery ball more risky, the unknown number of points could also be a negative number, taking away from the total score of the player who got the ball.

Kick Ball 300 is a variation where the ball is kicked as well as being thrown and caught. It was designed as a training exercise to promote cooperation in competitive games.
