= Paganello =

Beach ultimate tournament in Rimini, Italy

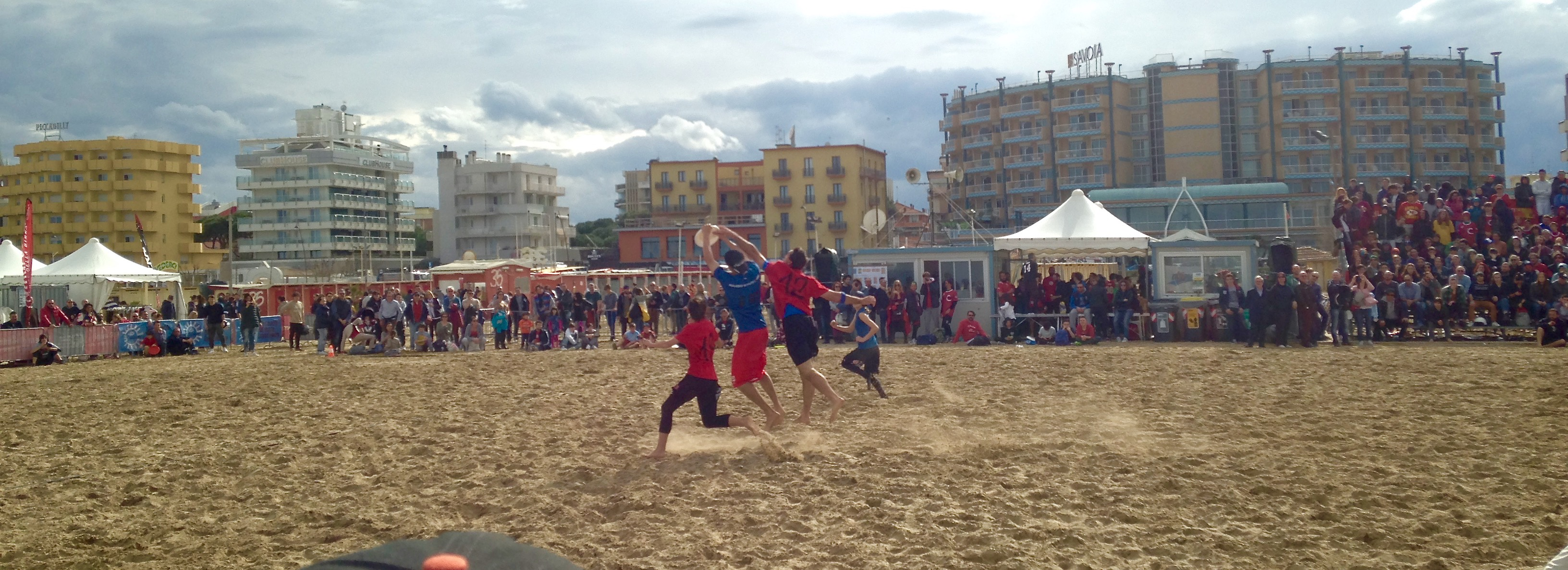
A match during the Paganello tournament, March 2016

The Beach Ultimate World Cup (Italian: Coppa del Mondo di Beach Ultimate), known as Paganello, is a beach ultimate tournament held over the Easter weekend in Rimini, in the region of Emilia-Romagna, northern Italy.

== Overview ==
First held in 1991, the tournament takes place over a 500-metre (1,600 ft) stretch of beach, between beaches 39 and 47. In 2023, the competition included 136 teams and 1,600 athletes in four categories: mixed, woman, open, and junior.

The tournament opens on Maundy Thursday with a welcome party, in which athletes receive free wine, sardines, and pasta, and concludes on Easter Monday with the finals and an awards ceremony. The event is accompanied by cultural shows along Rimini's beach.

Launched in 2008, the Green Paganello initiative has attempted to improve the tournament's ecosustainability, including through the introduction of organic frisbees, better water and waste management, and the use of renewable energy.

== Competitions ==
There are two competitions: a Frisbee tournament, and the Freestyle, which is more acrobatic.

In the Frisbee tournament, two teams of five players each play on a pitch measuring 75 metres (246 ft) by 25 metres (82 ft), and attempt to pass the disc into the opponent's goal. There is no physical contact between competitors, and no referee: a rule known as the Spirit of the Game (Spirito del Gioco) means disputes are resolved between players.

In the Freestyle tournament, which is held on pitches nearer the seashore, the frisbee is passed in time with music.
