= Frisbee =

Throwing toy

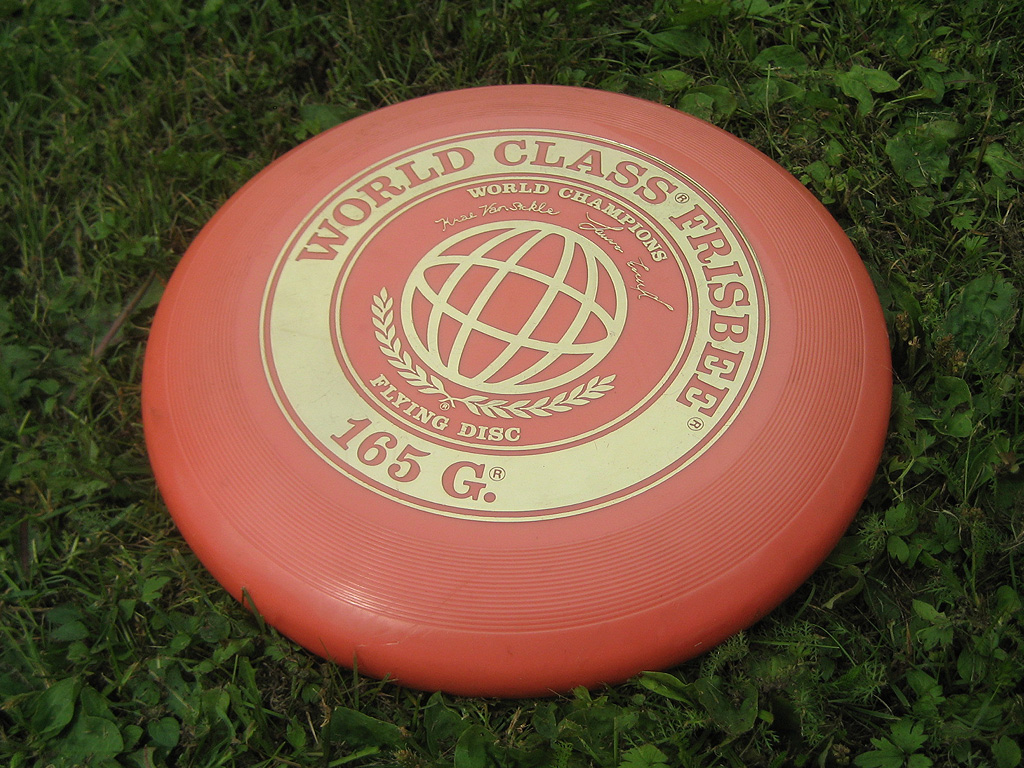
A flying disc with the Wham-O registered trademark "Frisbee"

A frisbee (pronounced /ˈfrɪzbiː/ FRIZ-bee), also called a flying disc or simply a disc, is a gliding toy or sporting item generally made of injection-molded plastic and roughly 20 to 25 centimetres (8 to 10 in) in diameter with a pronounced lip. It is used recreationally and competitively for throwing and catching, as in flying disc games. The shape of the disc is an airfoil in cross-section which allows it to fly by reducing the drag and increasing lift as it moves through the air, compared to a flat plate. Spinning the disc imparts a stabilizing gyroscopic force, allowing it to be both aimed with accuracy and thrown for distance.

A wide range of flying disc variants is available. Those for disc golf are usually smaller but denser compared to ultimate frisbee, and tailored for particular flight profiles to increase or decrease stability and distance. The longest recorded disc throw is by David Wiggins Jr. with a distance of 338 metres (1,109 ft). Disc dog sports use relatively slow-flying discs made of more pliable material to better resist a dog's bite and prevent injury to the dog. Flying rings are also available which typically travel significantly further than any traditional flying disc. Illuminated discs are made of phosphorescent plastic or contain chemiluminescent fluid or battery-powered LEDs for play after dark. Others whistle when they reach a certain velocity in flight.

The term frisbee is often used generically to describe all flying discs, but Frisbee is a registered trademark of the Wham-O toy company. This protection results in organized sports such as ultimate or disc golf having to forgo use of the word "Frisbee".

== History ==
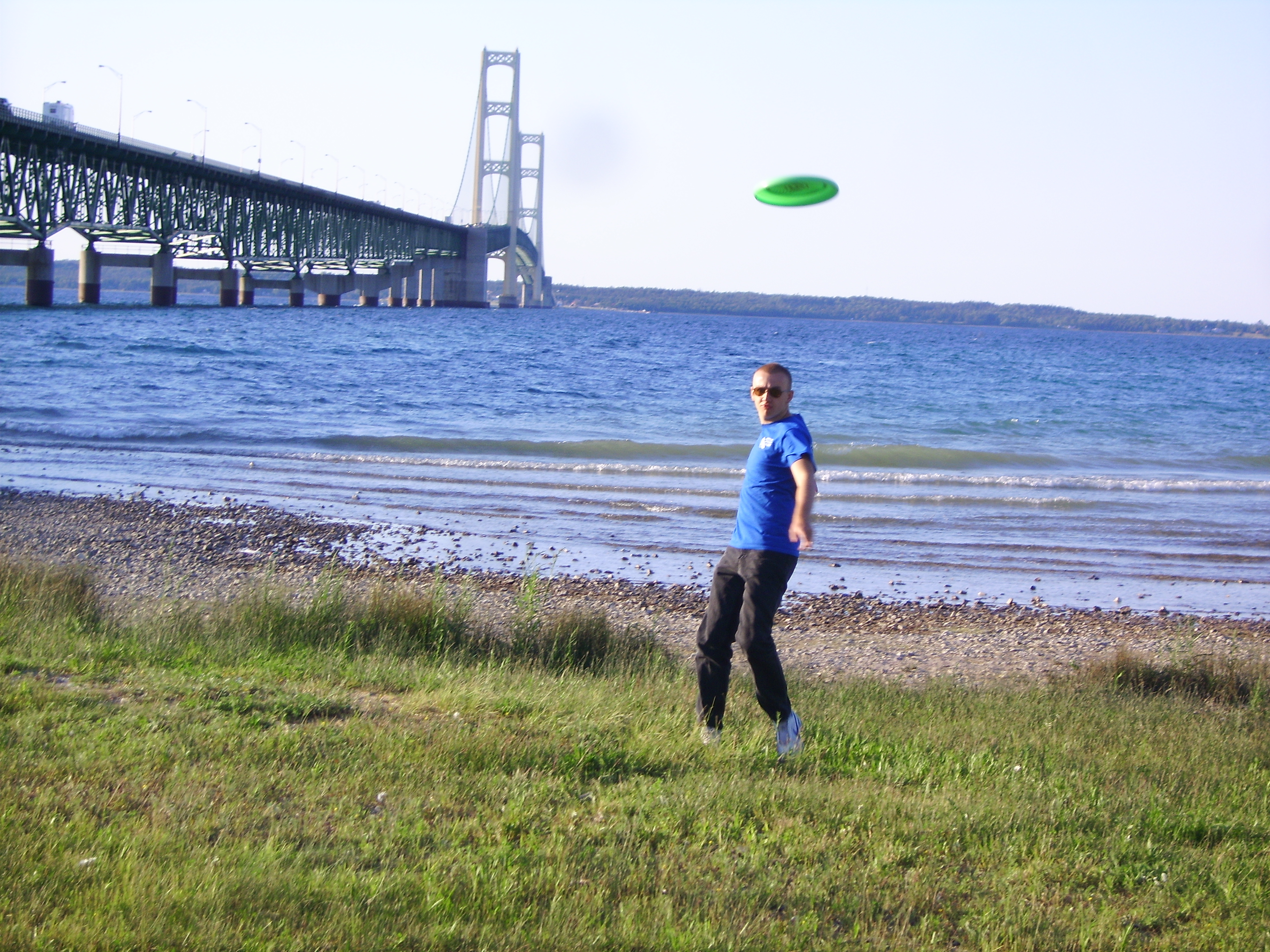
A flying disc in flight near the Mackinac Bridge

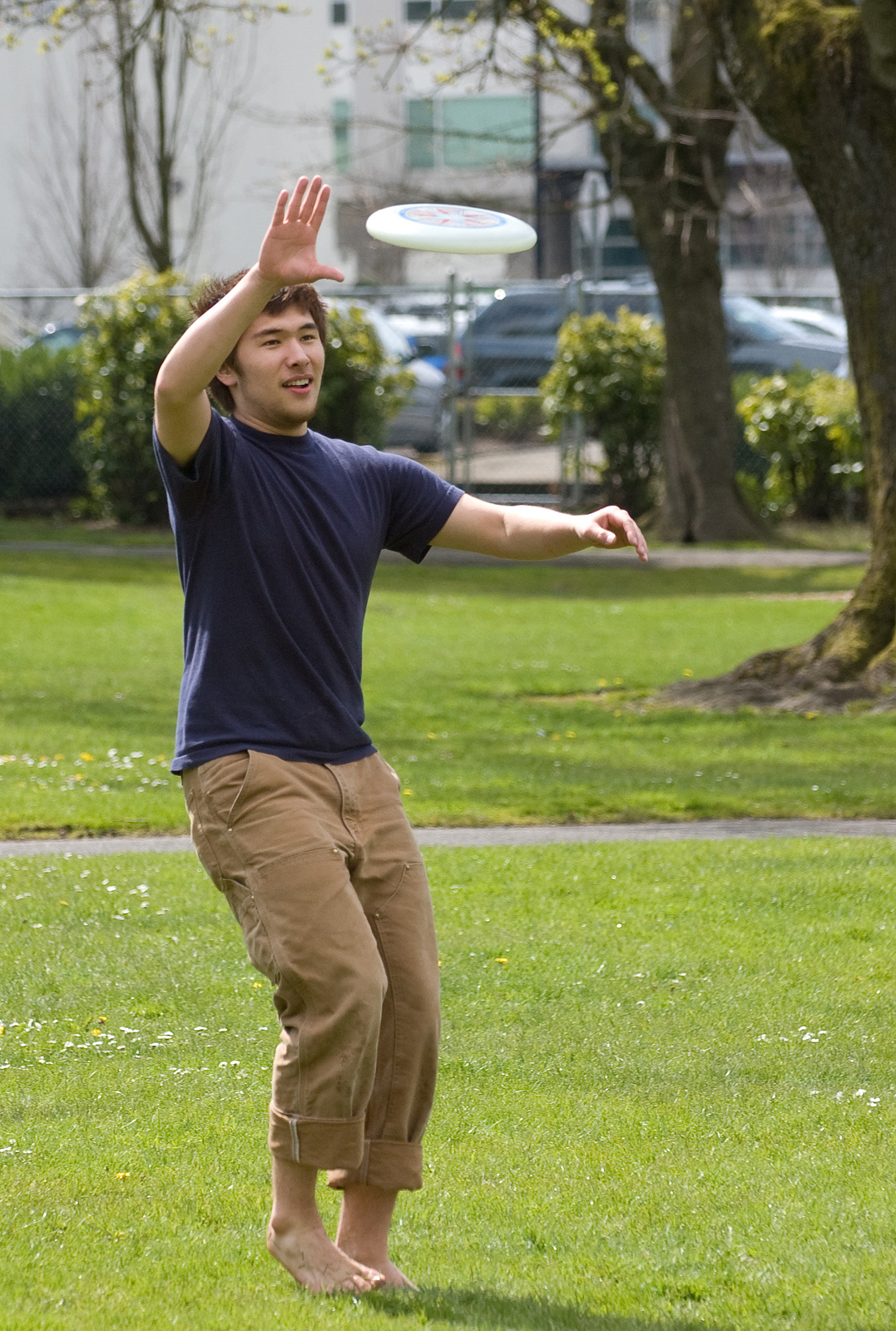
A flying disc being caught

Frisbees were invented in the late 1930s by the American inventor Walter Frederick Morrison. Morrison and his future wife Lucile had fun tossing a popcorn can lid after a Thanksgiving Day dinner in 1937. They soon discovered a market for a light-duty flying disc when they were offered 25 cents (equivalent to $6 in 2025) for a cake pan that they were tossing back and forth on a beach near Los Angeles. In 2007, in an interview in The Virginian-Pilot newspaper, Morrison compared that with the 5 cents (equivalent to $1 in 2025) it cost back then:

"That got the wheels turning, because you could buy a cake pan for five cents, and if people on the beach were willing to pay a quarter for it, well—there was a business."

The Morrisons continued their business until World War II, when Walter served in the Army Air Force flying P-47s, and then was a prisoner of war. After the war, Morrison sketched a design for an aerodynamically improved flying disc that he called the Whirlo-Way, after the famous racehorse Whirlaway. He and business partner Warren Franscioni began producing the first plastic discs by 1948, after design modifications and experimentation with several prototypes. They renamed them the "Flyin-Saucer" in the wake of reported unidentified flying object sightings.

"We worked fairs, demonstrating it," Morrison told the Virginian-Pilot. The two once overheard someone say that the pair were using wires to make the discs hover, so they developed a sales pitch: "The Flyin' Saucer is free, but the invisible wire is $1.00." (equivalent to $13 in 2025) "That's where we learned we could sell these things," he said, because people were enthusiastic about them.

Morrison and Franscioni ended their partnership in early 1950, and Morrison formed his own company in 1954 called American Trends to buy and sell "Flyin Saucers" (no hyphen after 1953), which were being made of flexible polypropylene plastic by Southern California Plastics, the original molder. He discovered that he could produce his own disc more cheaply, and he designed a new model in 1955 called the Pluto Platter, the archetype of all modern flying discs. He sold the rights to Wham-O on January 23, 1957. (Note: It is often mistakenly reported that the company began producing Frisbees on this date, but production did not actually begin until a few months later.)

In June 1957, Wham-O co-founders Richard Knerr and Arthur "Spud" Melin gave the disc the brand name "Frisbee" after learning college students were calling the Pluto Platter by that term, which was derived from the Connecticut-based pie manufacturer Frisbie Pie Company, a supplier of pies to Yale University, where students started a campus craze tossing empty pie tins stamped with the company's logo—the way Morrison and his wife had in 1937. In 1955 International Frisbee Association charter member Richard Warden first encountered frisbee as a freshman at Dartmouth.

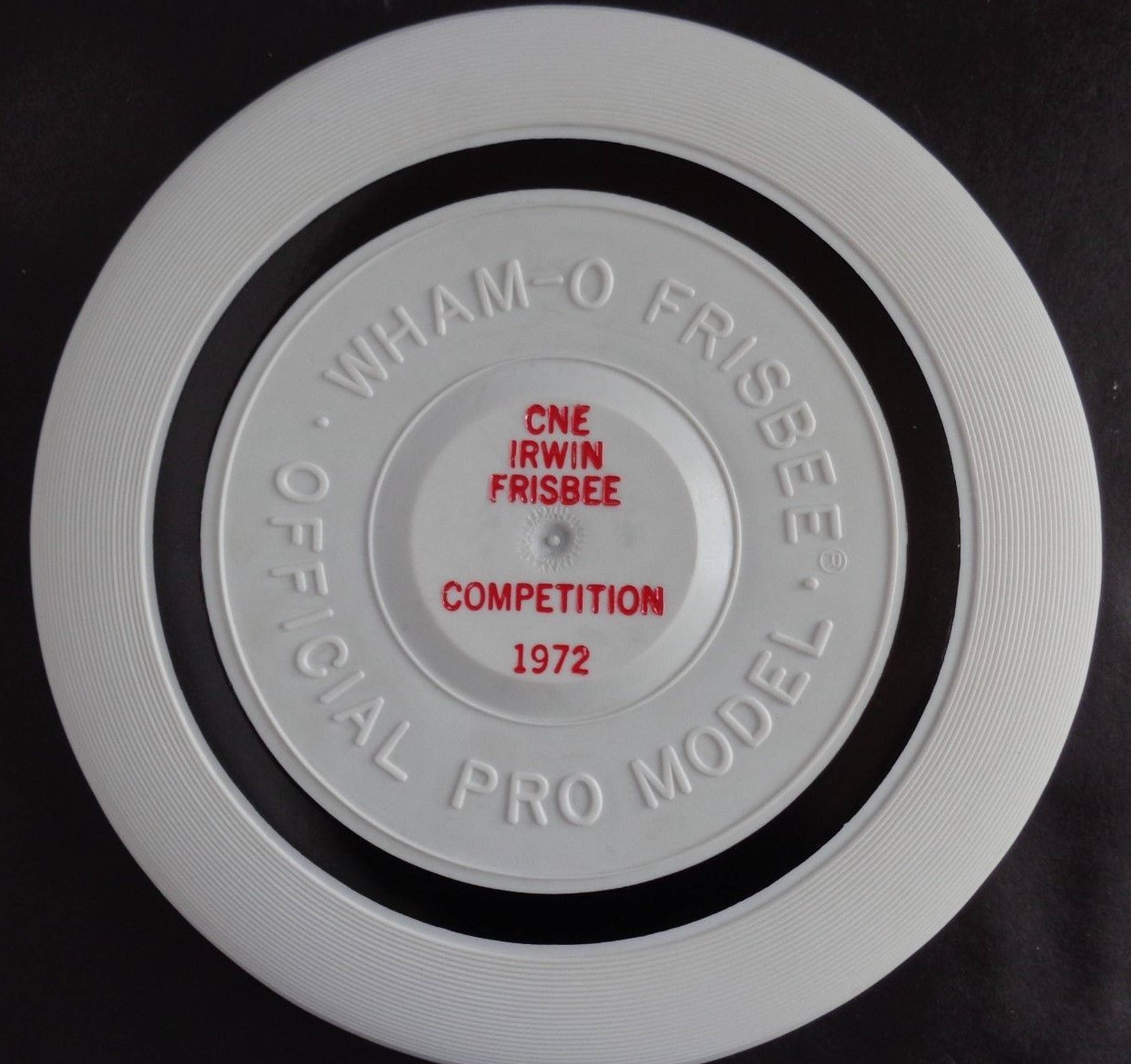
The first Frisbee (Professional Model) to be produced as a sport disc with the first disc sport tournament identification, the 1972 Canadian Open Frisbee Championships in Toronto.

In November 1957, the Frisbee was featured in what may be the first rock musical, Anything & Everything, written by Ted Nelson. The game of Frisbee (spelled Frisby) is described in the song "Friz Me the Frisby," as a Frisbee was passed among stooges in the audience. The scene was expressly intended as a way to introduce the game to the audience.

In 1958 the sport of Guts Frisbee was created in Eagle Harbor, Michigan. Rich Warden brought a Pluto Platter, and the idea of frisbee as a sport, home from Dartmouth. His friends, 4 Healy brothers, subsequently created the game of Guts Frisbee.

In 1964, Ed Headrick was hired as Wham-O's general manager and vice president of marketing. Headrick redesigned the Pluto Platter by reworking the mold, mainly to remove the names of the planets, but fortuitously increasing the rim thickness and mass in the process, creating a more controllable disc that could be thrown with higher accuracy.

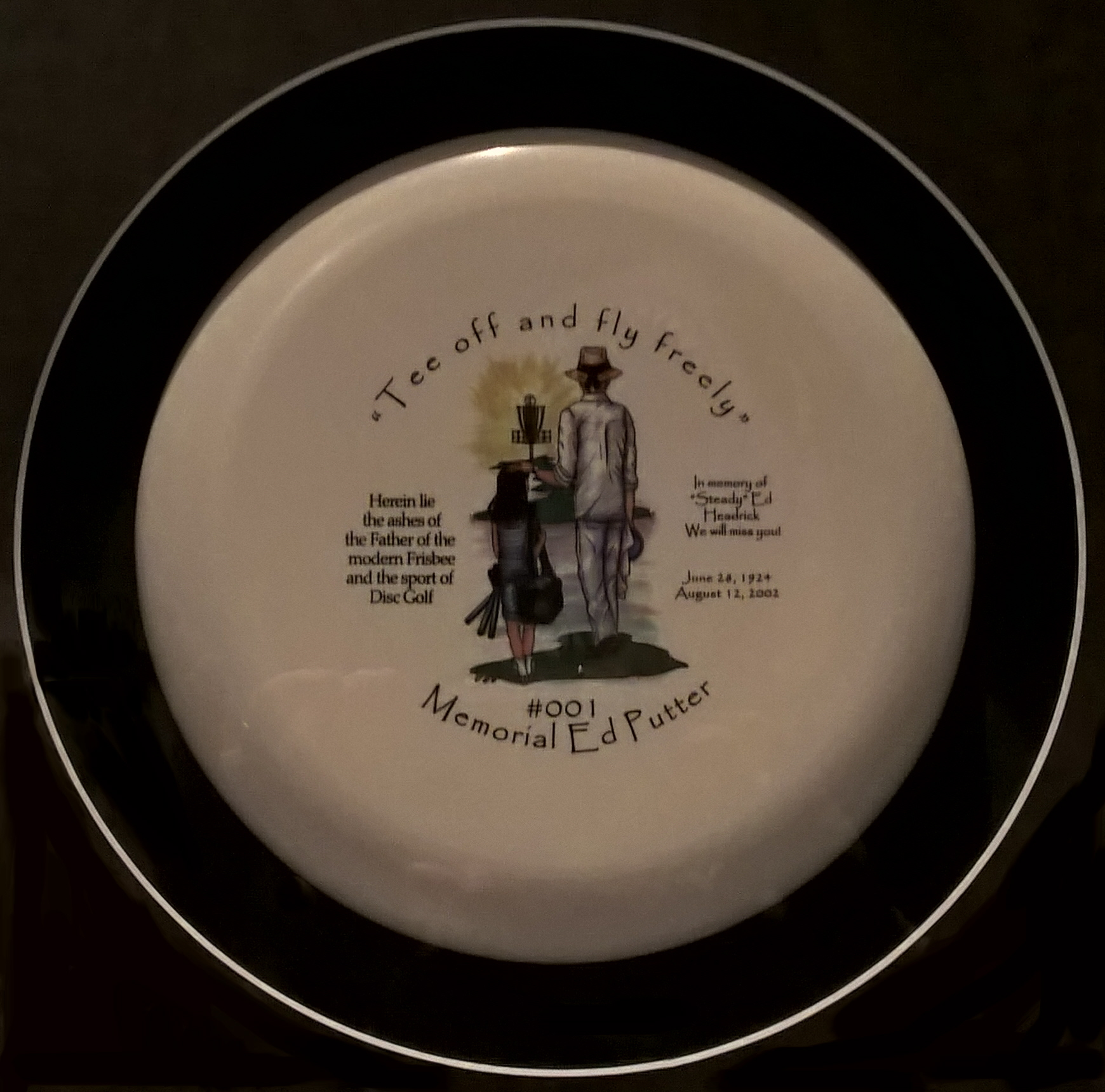
A memorial disc containing some of the ashes of Ed Headrick, on display at Ripley's Believe It or Not!, London.

Wham-O changed their marketing strategy to promote Frisbee use as a new sport, and sales increased. In 1964, the first professional model went on sale. Headrick patented its design; it featured raised ridges (the "Rings of Headrick") that were claimed to stabilize flight. In 1969 Michigan proclaimed July 6th of that year as Frisbee Day in recognition of the sport.

Headrick became known as the father of Frisbee sports; he founded the International Frisbee Association and soon after recruited Harvey J. Kukuk (a shared persona often portrayed as a real person) from Eagle Harbor to serve as Executive Director. In 1975 he appointed Dan Roddick as its head. In May 1976 Wham-O applied for Trademarks for International Frisbee Association and IFA, the former was canceled in 1984 and latter expired in 1998. Roddick began establishing North American Series (NAS) tournament standards for various Frisbee sports, such as Freestyle, Guts, Double Disc Court, and overall events. Headrick later helped to develop the sport of disc golf, which was first played with Frisbees and later with more aerodynamic beveled-rim discs, by inventing standardized targets called "pole holes". When Headrick died, he was cremated, and his ashes were molded into memorial discs and given to family and close friends and sold to benefit The Ed Headrick Memorial Museum.

In 1998, the Frisbee was inducted into the National Toy Hall of Fame. Many championships have sprung up around the world and the sport became very popular, with nine-time champion Miguel Larrañaga from Spain being the leading exponent of frisbee throwing.

== Variations of flying discs ==
Flying discs, also known as "frisbees," have variations produced for different purposes to optimize alternatives between branches of disc sports. The three main categories are: ultimate disc, golf disc, and freestyle disc.

=== Ultimate disc ===
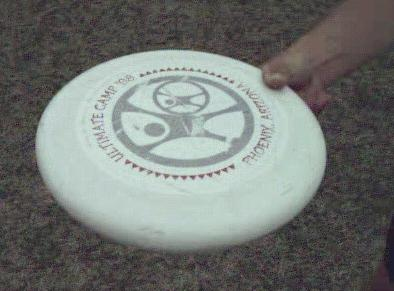
An ultimate frisbee.

Ultimate discs are designed for use in the sport of Ultimate. They are made of durable plastic (often polyethylene) and are designed to be thrown for the combination of maximum distance and accuracy.

Ultimate has a unique standard with a diameter of 27.3 centimetres (10.75 in) and a weight of 175 grams (6.2 oz). For competitive use, WFDF or other official organizations such as EuroDisc set disc standards to ensure quality.

=== Disc golf ===
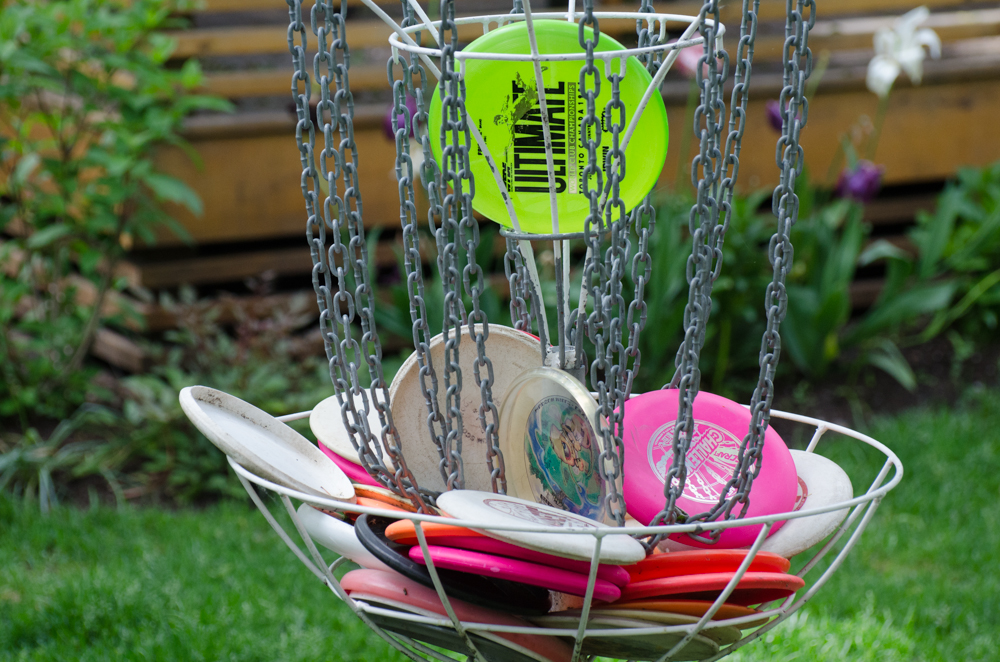
Disc golf discs in a target.

Another type of flying disc is the disc golf disc, which is used in disc golf. Disc golf discs are similar in size and shape to ultimate discs, but have different weights and designs. They are made of polypropylene. There are three main types of golf discs: drivers, mid-range discs, and putters.

Each type is designed for a specific purpose, with drivers being used for long-distance throws, mid-range discs for more controlled shots, and putters for short and accurate throws into the target. The rim for golf discs are sharper than ultimate frisbee, to reduce wind drag.

Each type of golf disc has hundreds of variations, subject to a uniform requirement in the size of discs: the minimum diameter of a golf disc is 21 cm (8.3 in).

=== Freestyle disc ===
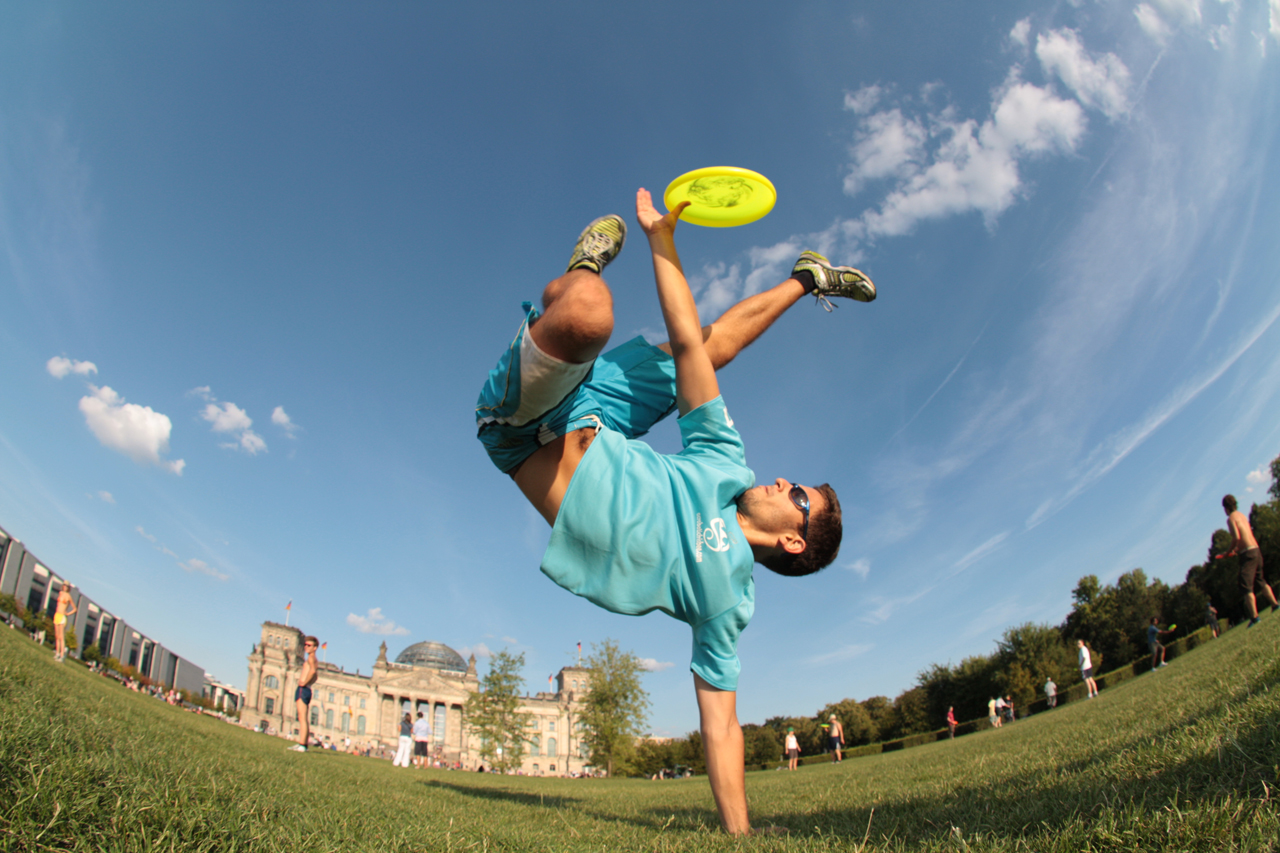
Freestyle disc

Freestyle discs are another variation of flying discs used in freestyle Frisbee competitions. These discs are usually smaller and lighter than other types of flying discs. Most freestyle discs have a diameter of 25.5 centimetres (10.0 in) or less and a weight of around 160 grams (5.6 oz), but this is subject to change according to the performer's need.

== Disc sports ==
The IFT Guts competitions in Northern Michigan (1958), the Canadian Open Frisbee Championships (1972), Toronto, Ontario, the Vancouver Open Frisbee Championships (1974), Vancouver, British Columbia, the Octad (1974), New Jersey, the American Flying Disc Open (1974), Rochester, New York, and the World Frisbee Championships (1974), Pasadena, California, are the earliest Frisbee competitions that presented the Frisbee as a new disc sport. Before these tournaments, the Frisbee was considered a toy and used for recreation.

=== Double disc court ===
Double disc court was invented and introduced in 1974 by Jim Palmeri, a sport played with two flying discs and two teams of two players. Each team defends its court and tries to land a flying disc in the opposing court, without the other team being able to catch it. It is a game highly based on correct timing of throws and catches, and less about athleticism compared to some of the other disc sports.

=== Disc dog ===
Dogs and their human flying disc throwers compete in events such as distance catching and somewhat choreographed freestyle catching.

=== Disc golf ===
This is a precision and accuracy sport where individual players throw a flying disc at a target pole hole. In 1926, In Bladworth, Saskatchewan, Canada, Ronald Gibson and a group of his Bladworth Elementary school friends played a game using metal lids, they called "Tin Lid Golf". In 1976, the game of disc golf was standardized with targets called "pole holes" invented and developed by Wham-O's Ed Headrick.

=== Freestyle competition ===
In 1974, freestyle competition was created and introduced by Ken Westerfield and Discraft's Jim Kenner. Teams of two or three players are judged as they perform a routine that consists of a series of creative throwing and catching techniques set to music.

=== Goaltimate ===
A half-court disc game derived from ultimate, similar to hot box. The object is to advance the disc on the field of play by passing, and score points by throwing the flying disc to a teammate in a small scoring area.

=== Guts ===
The game of guts was invented by the Healy Brothers in the 1950s and developed at the International Frisbee Tournament (IFT) in Eagle Harbor, Michigan. Two teams of one to five team members stand in parallel lines facing each other across a court and throw flying discs at members of the opposing team.

=== KanJam ===
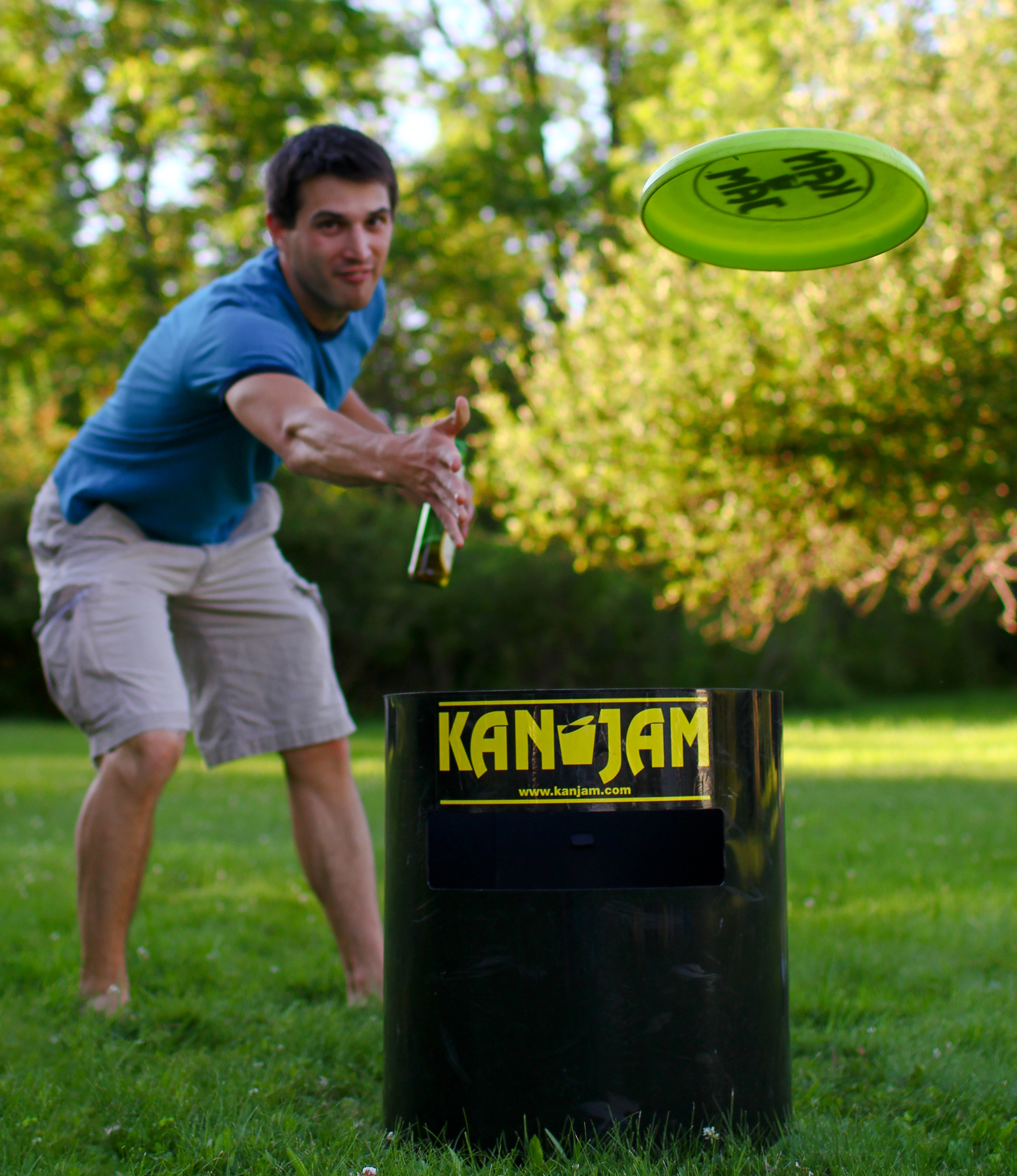
Man plays KanJam.

A patented game scoring points by throwing and deflecting the flying disc and hitting or entering the goal. The game ends when a team scores exactly 21 points or "chogs" the disc for an instant win.

=== Ultimate ===
The most widely played disc game began in the late 1960s with Joel Silver and Jared Kass. In the 1970s, it developed as an organized sport with the creation of the Ultimate Players Association by Dan Roddick, Tom Kennedy, and Irv Kalb.

The object of the game is to advance the disc and score points by eventually passing the disc to a team member in the opposing team's end zone. Players may not run while holding the disc.

== Disc-wing Aerodynamics ==
=== Theory ===
Frisbees are characterized aerodynamically as disc-wings. While their profile is generally an aerofoil like most wings, disc-wing flight is distinct from other wing arrangements because the center of pressure of a disk at a typical flight angle of attack (AOA) is ahead of the center of gravity for the disk. Therefore, without stabilizing gyroscopic effects from the disk's spin, the frisbee has a tendency to roll about the direction of motion.

The aerodynamic flight of a disc-wing consists of two main changing components, the coefficient of lift (C_{L}), and the coefficient of drag (C_{D}). They are governed by the following.

$C_L=C_{L0}+C_{L\alpha}\alpha$

$C_D=C_{D0}+C_{D\alpha}\alpha^2$

Where C_{L0} and C_{D0} are base lift and drag values of the airfoil itself, based on its geometry, as well as skin friction and pressure drag for C_{D0} [6]. The other two parameters, C_{Lα} and C_{Dα}, are the effects that on the lift and drag brought on by changes in the angle of attack (α).

Overall lift and drag for a disc-wing can be calculated from the coefficients of lift and drag using the following equations.

$L=Av^2C_L\rho/2$

$D=Av^2C_D\rho/2$

Where ρ is the density of air, A is the surface area of the frisbee and v is the velocity of the frisbee. It is noted that in almost all calculations, the airfoil is approximated as a disc and as such A is calculated through the standard area of a circle formula.

Another contributing factor to the aerodynamics is the pitching moment of the frisbee. This is caused due to an imbalance of the lift force between the front and back ends of the frisbee during the flight, and causes the AOA to change based on the moment it experiences. As such, lift, drag, AOA, velocity in x, y, and z as well as acceleration in x and z change throughout the duration of the flight.

The changes in velocity and acceleration in the z direction are due to a force known as the Robins-Magnis force acting on the frisbee. When a spin is applied, the frisbee experiences a force that causes it to travel in a curved path relative to the ground. As such, depending on the spin that the frisbee experiences, it could drift far to the left or to the right of the thrower, even if a thrown with no z direction velocity, due to the spin that is applied.

Some spin is necessary for stable flight of the frisbee, as the angular momentum self stabilizes in the air and allows for a smooth flight. This is due to the spin causing the frisbee to act as a gyroscope in the air. The roll dynamics and moments that a frisbee experiences play an insignificant role in the flight dynamics of the frisbee.

=== Research into disc-wing aerodynamics ===
The limited use of flying discs in mainstream aeronautical applications means that research and procedures for studying them are less available than for traditional wing shapes.

A common thread across existing research materials is that theoretical results for disc trajectories and performance are checked against data collected in the field. Professional Ultimate and disc golf players are preferred because they provide consistent release speeds and angles of attack. For example, researchers developed a 2D flight dynamics approximation to find the theoretical maximum range an unpowered disk can travel given a set launch speed, and checked it against field tests.

Sources agree that controlling the trajectory of a frisbee to make landing points repeatable relies on understanding spin rate's effect on frisbee lift and curve. One study using smoke wire flow visualization and particle image velocimetry measurements determined that spin rate has a slight but noticeable effect on a disk's aerodynamic drag. At a low AOA (under 5 degrees), the trailing edge vortex strength remained unchanged between spinning and non-spinning tests. However, greater angles of attack allowed rotation to generate a large vortex region that heightened drag. In a similar experiment using a different frisbee design, spin assisted lift across the board but lift enhancement was inversely proportional to the angle of attack.

== See also ==
- Aerobie
- AUDL
- Boomerang
- Discus
- Flying ring
- Flying cylinder
- Ultimate Canada
- USA Ultimate
