= History of Canadian sports =

The history of sports in Canada falls into five stages of development: early recreational activities before 1840; the start of organized competition, 1840–1880; the emergence of national organizations, 1882–1914; the rapid growth of both amateur and professional sports, 1914 to 1960; and developments of the last half-century. Some sports, especially ice hockey, lacrosse, curling, and ringette enjoy an international reputation as particularly Canadian. Although typically thought of as American, the origin of the sport of baseball began in the Canadian town of Beachville, Ontario, and American football was initially developed by Canadians at McGill University before two different playing styles emerged, American football and Canadian football. Canadian sports attract large numbers of participants and huge audiences; hockey has become part of the national identity.

Women actively compete in most of these sports. Historically, team sports often involved informal gambling and more formal, bigger-stakes wagering and prize competitions were particularly characteristic in the sports of horse racing and boxing. In Canada, individual sports such as figure skating, skiing, golf, paddling, swimming, and track and field have long been important. In recent years, there has been an increase in the popularity of more "extreme" sports such as snowboarding, rollerblading, and mountain climbing.

In many modern nations including Canada, sports have faced a number of challenges in recent decades such as violence, racism, illegal drug therapies, ridicule of women, the disproportionally high salaries of professional athletes, and the exorbitant costs of newly built stadiums. Such problems stand in contrast to the fundamental values of sports including personal health, teamwork, striving for responsibility, loyalty, equality, winning, pleasure, and freedom.

== Origins ==
Immigrants brought along their favourite sports, often adapting them to the snowy environment. The influence of the games of the First Nations can be seen especially in the evolution of lacrosse. British officers, soldiers, and royal officials, and indeed ordinary British immigrants as well, transplanted such games as association football, rugby, curling, and cricket; sailors brought rowing competitions. Britons considered these sports to be conducive to relieving boredom on remote outposts, and more generally produced team spirit, good health, hardiness, and manliness; they were a sophisticated alternative to "blood sports", such as cockfighting, bullfighting or bear baiting.

=== First Nations ===
Paraschak identifies two approaches to the history of Native American sports. On the one hand, there is the history of First Nation athletes playing within the Euro-American mainstream culture. Important topics include the issues of racism, exploitation, and ethnocentric distortion. Secondly there is the history of the sports played among the natives, especially the history of lacrosse as well as other games. The different tribes played (and wagered bets on) toboggan, snowshoe, and canoe races as well as archery, wrestling, spear throwing and running events. They provided entertainment for the community and a way to sharpen essential survival skills, including the ability to endure pain and hardship.

=== First organized sports ===
The roots of organized sports in Canada date back to the 1770s, often originating in horse racing at British military garrisons, curling in Scottish settlements, and lacrosse among the Indians. Perhaps the first athletic celebrities were the Canadian scullers who won several international championships.

=== Cultural influences of sports ===
French Canadians by 1700 were influenced by native culture to the degree that they began to measure themselves and their masculinity against their native counterparts by competing against them in such activities as canoeing, snowshoeing, and tobogganing and in the team sport of lacrosse. In building on this mix of French and native traditions, the French Canadiens expressed not only their masculinity and identity through sports, but also built a sense of national identity that contrasted sharply with the Anglo spirit of sports for bourgeois gentlemen during the Victorian era.

Much of Canadian historiography on sports education deals with the linkage between sports education and the construction of a national identity. Hudon examines the history of sports education from 1870 to 1940 in Quebec's classic schools for boys from ages 11 to 18. He finds an impact of religious pedagogy on sports education, arguing that it promoted a Catholic spirituality with masculine undertones.

In Anglophone Canada a strong influence came from the ideals of English author and reformer Thomas Hughes, especially as exemplified in Tom Brown's School Days (1857). Hughes's notions that sportsmanship exemplified moral education and provided training for citizenship, have had a powerful influence on the Canadian sport community. Despite commercialism and the celebration of high-performance athletes, the Hughesian principles of Christian socialism continues to influence sports programs for youth. Outside of sports the social and moral agendas behind muscular Christianity influenced numerous reform movements, thus linking it to the political left in Canada, contrary to its right-wing reputation in other parts of the world.

Canadians in the 19th century came to believe themselves possessed of a unique "northern character," due to the long, harsh winters that only those of hardy body and mind could survive. This hardiness was claimed as a Canadian trait, and such sports as ice hockey and snowshoeing that reflected this were asserted as characteristically Canadian. Outside the arena, Canadians express the national characteristics of being peaceful, orderly and polite. Inside they scream during ice hockey games, cheering the speed, ferocity, and violence, making hockey an ambiguous symbol of Canada.

== Sports fans ==
The advantage of the larger cities was the potential availability of a large paying crowd; the problem was providing cheap transportation for people not living close by. The solution was to use steamers, and later railways and trams to run special schedules to bring fans to an outlying event. As early as the 1830s steamers were making special trips to horseracing events to horse races. By the 1860s there were special trains or steamers to take fans to rowing contests, track and field events, bicycle races, and other contests.

Baseball emerged in the 1870s, as a nonviolent, rules-oriented game that appealed to middle-class reformers seeking antidotes to crime, rowdiness and social disorder. However, when professional baseball emerged in the 1880s, unruly behavior by players and fans contradicted the reformers ideal of a gentleman's game played before a well-behaved audience. Gambling became a major feature, as did the rise of working-class players and rowdy working-class fans. The only solution the reformers found was to separate gentleman elite amateur baseball from the professional version that was getting out of control.

Although many small cities and towns had their own local teams, the residents paid special attention to the celebrity players on the big-city teams. Advancing technology of the telegraph, the radio, and television allowed real time reporting of major games, often to public gatherings or restaurants and bars. Further details were sure to appear in the next newspaper, keeping up local interest, and wagering, on a daily basis. Vicarious participation as the fan of a particular team enhanced a sense of belonging to the Canadian nation and its rapidly developing popular culture.

=== Funding ===
In recent decades professional sports has involved large-scale funding for stadiums. The intense interest shown by the fan base in their community's teams encourages the political leadership to invest heavily in public subsidies for new arenas. There is a "honeymoon" effect producing a surge in attendance in the first few years of the new arena. In the 1972–2003 era, the honeymoon effect for major new arenas in hockey, baseball, and basketball is an increase in attendance of 15–20% in the first few years. The honeymoon ends after 5 to 8 years.

=== Media ===
As the popular daily press emerged in all Canadian cities in the late 19th century, they broadened their audience appeal by detailed coverage of local provincial and national sporting events. Readers developed a sense of community pride, while also involving fans in the national and international "world of sport." The telegraph provided near-real-time coverage of events. Despite the vast distances separating them from other Canadians, local fans discovered that they were part of a common national audience as they followed the successes and disappointments of Canadian and American hockey and baseball teams, as well as such sports as rowing and boxing.

== Organizational infrastructure ==
In the early 20th century the major sports set up volunteer national organizations to take jurisdiction; by 1914 there were 20 governing bodies. By 1919 the Amateur Athletic Union of Canada (AAU) presided over all leadership and provided international recognition. The AAU promoted participation in the Olympics. All the governing bodies saw sport as a suitable training ground or productive citizenship, allegiance to the social order, and English Canadian nationalism. They fought against professionalism through a "Canadian Parliament of Sport". However, in the 1930s the amateur leaders split bitterly over the issue of a liberalized amateur code, as ice hockey, basketball and lacrosse walked out of the AAU. By 1939, the jurisdiction of the AAU was reduced to track and field and the other individual Olympic sports. The Canadian Olympic Association broke away in 1948.

From 1909 until 1967, the Canadian Track and Field Association (C.T.F.A.) controlled track and field sports. It operated under the umbrella of the A.A.U. of C. (Amateur Athletic Union of Canada). In 1968, the C.T.F.A broke loose from the A.A.U. of C. The A.A.U. of C. dissolved in the early 1970s as all national the federations in the different sports went their own ways. In 1991 the C.T.F.A. changed its name to Athletics Canada.

== Ice hockey ==
Early men's ice hockey leagues (1886–1926)
Amateur Hockey Association of Canada
Manitoba Hockey Association
Western Pennsylvania Hockey League
CAHL
FAHL
IPHL
ECAHA
TPHL
OPHL
CHA
National Hockey Association
Pacific Coast Hockey Association
WCHL
│
1886
│
1891
│
1896
│
1901
│
1906
│
1911
│
1916
│
1921
│
1926

Informal stick-and-ball games on ice had been played for years, especially in the Maritime provinces and at military garrisons. In its modern form hockey was standardized by students at McGill University in 1875. The game rapidly spread nationwide; recognition came in 1893 when Lord Stanley, Canada's governor general, established the Stanley Cup. Ice hockey was distinctly Canadian; it was a winter sport with vague rules, played on conveniently available outside ice. There were few spectators. Professional teams appeared around 1900; in 1904, five cities in the United States and Ontario formed the International Hockey League (IHL). The American-based league paid salaries that attracted many Canadian stars. Canadian amateur teams were forced to secretly pay their players, even as they proclaimed the principles of amateurism. The IHL collapsed in 1907. in 1908 came the first Canadian-based professional league, the Ontario Professional Hockey League. The Timiskaming League, fuelled by gambling and mining profits, started paying players and raiding amateur and professional senior teams for players

Canadians explored polar extremes of masculinity by a watching the Ottawa Silver Seven battle the Montreal Wanderers in 1907. Reporters depicted the game as a combination of "strenuous spectacle" and "brutal butchery." Middle-class ideals of gentlemanly masculinity and genteel sportsmanship stood opposed to a rough, working-class expression of violent masculinity. They both coexisted within the fast, skilled, rugged, hard-hitting hockey, thereby appealing to the largest possible audience.

By 1910, the world of ice hockey had split into two worlds, the amateurs of the junior, intermediates and the seniors playing for the new Allan Cup, while the professionals took over as the elite leagues, playing for the Stanley Cup. From a combination of the money of the mining of Timiskaming and the industry of Montreal, the National Hockey Association (NHA) was formed. Unlike previous leagues, which were derived from amateur hockey associations, the NHA organized itself as a business, organizing each team as a franchise of the business and first used standard player's contracts and a salary cap. Professional ice hockey came to the west coast with the arrival of the Patrick family, organizing the Pacific Coast Hockey Association (PCHA). Organized as a single business, it developed as an alternative elite league and furthered the development of ice hockey in western Canada. Professional ice hockey was established from coast to coast by this time. Although the PCHA eventually failed, other professional leagues were organized to take its place.

In 1917, the NHA became the National Hockey League (NHL). After a few weak years, the NHL grew with expansion into the United States. By 1940 it had strong bases in Montreal, Toronto, Boston, New York, Chicago, and Detroit—the "original six". After 1926 it became a cartel that controlled all aspects of professional hockey. Other professional leagues one by one collapsed. The NHL exerted its control by expansion into the U.S., the establishment of a minor league system.

At the same time, amateur hockey continued, and was still competitive with professional ice hockey. The Winnipeg Falcons, composed of Icelandic Canadians, was excluded from Winnipeg's senior hockey league for the 1919–20 season. Nevertheless, the team became Canadian national champions and won the 1920 Olympic gold medal in Antwerp. Combined with their willingness to volunteer for military service in the Great War, its success made the team a symbol of Canadian manhood, transcending the ethnic stereotyping and discrimination that affected some other sports teams during postwar era.

With fans having less discretionary spending during the Great Depression, the Canadian Amateur Hockey Association faced financial uncertainty. Its response was to reevaluate its purist position on amateurism and to rethink its relation to the system of amateur sports, which was headed by the Amateur Athletic Union of Canada. The weak performance of the Canadian hockey team at the 1936 Olympics led to substantial changes in policies and procedures.

The NHL formed an affiliation with the major governing body in Canadian amateur hockey, the Canadian Amateur Hockey Association (CAHA). The alliances made with the minor leagues and the CAHA, in particular, gave the NHL's market control over players such as the waivers, reserve clause, draft, and territorial right much broader impact. Although the NHL only had six teams, they had control of the best players. Players could be signed for life to an NHL team's organization at the age of twelve.

The original six era cemented the NHL as the biggest draw in Canada, fuelled partly by the rivalry of the Montreal Canadiens and the Toronto Maple Leafs. The Canadiens' Maurice "Rocket" Richard (1921–2000) became one of Canada's iconic heroes, especially in Quebec. Playing from 1942 to 1960, he scored 544 regular season goals and 82 more in playoffs. Famed for his dashing style of play, his intensity, determination, and scoring prowess, Richard became the first 50-goal scorer in NHL history in 1944–45, with a 50-game schedule. He was named to the All Star team 14 times, won two Hart trophies as league MVP, and led the Canadiens to eight Stanley Cups.

After World War II, the amateur system declined in the face of competition from professional ice hockey, both in the growth of minor leagues, and the introduction of televised matches by the NHL. Several amateur leagues, such as the Quebec Senior League, became first mixed then fully professional. While senior play for the Allan Cup continued, fewer and fewer senior players were available. Further growth in hockey leagues in the United States led to further demand for players. By this time, several of the minor leagues had many players who could have played in the NHL, had there been more teams. By the 1960s, there was interest in setting up another professional league in the United States. In response, the NHL expanded to 12 teams, the new positions mostly filled by players from the minors. The control of junior players by the NHL went away at this time. The signing of contracts to under-age players, binding them to a single team was replaced by a draft of the available players by the NHL teams. The junior leagues became the pre-eminent Canadian leagues, discarding the control of the regional associations to set up "major junior" leagues. Senior amateur play dwindled further with the increase in professional positions.

By the 1960s, Canada had difficulty forming amateur senior teams to compete internationally. University players and a dedicated amateur national team were no match for the organized amateurism of teams from Europe, especially the Soviet Union. Finally, the Canadian ice hockey federation broke off from amateur play at the Olympics and world championships. The Canadians demanded that the organizations allow professionals, those considered Canada's best.

In September 1972, Canada's best hockey players from the National Hockey League (NHL) played the elite amateurs from the Soviet Union in a friendly series. Canadian prime minister Pierre Trudeau and his Soviet counterpart, Alexei Kosygin in 1971 proposed increasing the hockey competitions between the two northern nations. National hockey officials Planned series of eight games, four to be played across Canada and four in Moscow. Canadians saw the Summit Series as an affirmation of their global supremacy in hockey. However, the Soviets planned an upset that would impress the world and let them claim the Canadian game as their own. The publicity was enormous. The media portrayed a global contests pitting East against West - communism against capitalism - and many of the players were swept away with the sense of history in the making. The Summit series became a politically charged event with widespread cultural repercussions - quite literally, a Cold War. The Canadians fell 2 games behind but swept the final three games in Moscow to win the series four games to three, with one tie.

The Summit Series awoke an interest in developing the sport of ice hockey further in Canada. Before 1919, few safety rules existed in amateur hockey. By 1945, however, there were rules against boarding and hits from behind, and fighting was penalized more severely. By 1972, the professionals still did not wear helmets, required in amateur play. Fighting was still allowed in amateur and professional play in Canada. There was also an interest in further developing the quality of instruction. Canada returned to international play with the IIHF and the Olympics allowing professionals.

At the same time, the number of professional teams was expanding with the formation of the World Hockey Association. New professional teams were formed in Edmonton, Winnipeg, Quebec and Ottawa. Several of the teams made it into the expanded NHL in 1979, which now had professional teams from Vancouver all the way east to Quebec City. The 1980s saw a period of consolidation, and the introduction of European players into the professional teams of the NHL, made necessary by the expansion of the NHL. In the 1990s, the Canadian dollar declined, and while Canada gained an NHL team in Ottawa, teams from Quebec City and Winnipeg move to the United States.

Women's hockey continued to develop in popularity in the 1980s. The first women's world championship was held in 1990. Women's ice hockey became a medal sport in the Olympics of 1998. Women players developed to the point where professional leagues were organized and women players started playing in men's professional leagues.

The Memorial Cup, a tournament originated in 1920 for junior-level teams began to grow in popularity. The junior leagues also grew in popularity and expanded into United States near to the border. The junior leagues, like the professionals, started to allow non-Canadian players, partly in response to the American teams, and partly in response to the growing popularity and competition within its ranks to make it to the Memorial Cup tournament. The growth of cable television meant more junior-level games were televised.

By 2022, the NHL had grown to 32 teams. The junior leagues had consolidated into three; in Quebec and the Maritimes, Ontario and Western Canada. The further introduction of European players became a concern and was limited. In 2002, Canada won its first men's ice hockey title in 50 years, at the Olympics in Salt Lake City, using NHL players. The Canadian team won another title in 2010, at the Olympics held in Vancouver, where the Olympics used Canadian standard-sized rinks.

== Ringette ==
Canada Sports Hall of Fame inductee, Sam Jacks, a Canadian born in Scotland whose parents immigrated to Canada when he was five, invented ringette in West Ferris in Northern Ontario (now North Bay, Ontario), in 1963. Red McCarthy of Espanola, Ontario was responsible for designing ringette's first set of official rules using basketball concepts for guidance, and the organization of the Northern Ontario Recreation Directors Association (NORDA) was responsible for the sport's early development in Canada. The Society of Directors of Municipal Recreation of Ontario (SDMRO) of which Sam Jacks was President was eventually tasked with developing the sport further and eventually passed the copyright for the sport's rules onto the Ontario Ringette Association (now Ringette Ontario) before they were eventually acquired by Ringette Canada.

== Football, rugby and soccer ==
The game of Soccer goes back centuries in England, where around 1823 was transformed into rugby. The first game in Canada came in the 1860s with British officers playing university students in Montreal. Universities quickly adopted the new sport, as did rowing clubs that found it useful in the off-season. The Americans were developing a similar game, so in 1874 McGill played two games with Harvard, alternating the rules. The series was played out for several years, but Canada increasingly adopted the American rules and so the two versions of football were very similar. In 1898 the Canadian rules were formalized; they differed from the American rules chiefly in the size of the field and in three- rather than four-down play.

Governor General Earl Grey donated a championship trophy in 1907 to the best amateur team; the Grey Cup went to the professional champions in 1954. Major innovations, such as the forward pass, came in the 1920s and 1930s as American athletes and coaches arrived. In 1936, fearful of the drift towards Americanization, the Canadian Rugby Union placed a limit on the number of foreigners; import quotas remain in effect in the 21st century. After 1945 football flourished at the intercollegiate and professional levels. The Canadian Football League (CFL) distributed franchises across the country, and crowds flocked to the games. The Grey Cup championship game, first telecast in 1952, attracts one of the largest TV audiences, over 4 million. The CFL added five American teams in 1993; this proved a costly blunder, as four teams folded and the fifth moved to Montreal. After surviving the closing of the Ottawa Rough Riders in 1996 and bankruptcies by the Toronto and Hamilton teams in 2003, football has recovered and is in fair health in the 21st century.

Soccer in Canada has grown in popularity in recent decades, especially as a school sport for boys and girls. It has more players than ice hockey. At the professional level, the Toronto FC in 2007 became the first Canadian club in the American Major League Soccer (MLS). In 2009, another MLS franchise was awarded to Vancouver, and began play in the 2011 season. In 2010, an MLS franchise was awarded to Montreal for the 2012 season. Both the Vancouver and Montreal clubs had their roots in lower-tier professional soccer leagues.

== Other sports ==
=== Lacrosse ===
Lacrosse was invented in the 1850s, when the Anglophone middle class of Montreal adopted the Indian game of "baggataway", which was a violent game played by the First Nation teams numbering hundreds of players. The 1860s saw the first powerhouse team, the Montreal Shamrocks; it was Irish, Catholic, and aggressive. During the 1870s and 1880s the Shamrocks had bloody confrontations with the upscale Protestant Montreal and Toronto Lacrosse Clubs. Field lacrosse spread across the country with the tide of Anglophone settlers from Ontario and Quebec. By the early 1890s it was the most popular summer game in Canada. The golden age came in the 1900s, as two professional leagues operated. Escalating violence led to the collapse of the professional leagues in 1914, and the game's base of support shrank to Montreal, Victoria, Vancouver, New Westminster, and small-towns in Ontario. The organizational infrastructure proved too weak—for example, it was never adopted by schools or churches.

In 1931, promoters introduced "box lacrosse" to broaden the fan base to include a summer audience. Played in a smaller space, box lacrosse could be held indoors or in baseball stadiums. The game was especially violent. The poverty of the Great Depression reduced the number of fans who could afford to attend and cities that could find sponsors. The promoters, while failing to make a profit, changed the landscape of Canadian amateur lacrosse, isolating it from the more widely contested field lacrosse played in the United States, Britain, and Australia. In 1987 the National Lacrosse League began; it opened clubs in twelve cities in the United States and Canada.

Field lacrosse was revived in the late 1990s when some Ontario universities included it in their women's athletic programs; university women now play the game once associated with Canadian masculinity.

=== Basketball ===
James Naismith, a Canadian who emigrated to the U.S., invented basketball in Springfield, Massachusetts in the 1890s. It rapidly became popular as an indoor winter sport that needed a minimum of equipment, gaining popularity at upscale high schools and colleges in both the U.S. and Canada. In 1946, early in the era of professional basketball, the owners of the Toronto Maple Leaf hockey team started a franchise in the newly formed Basketball Association of America. Seven thousand spectators watched the first game of the Toronto Huskies, but they lost and attendance fell off as newsmen called it a freak show. The Huskies ended in last place, and folded. It had suffered inconsistent management decisions and the temper tantrums of its coach. The Huskies could not compete with Toronto's successful teams and sporting heroes in hockey, baseball, football, rugby, and wrestling.

=== Boxing ===
The sport of boxing, both amateur and professional, has been practised in Canada since before Confederation. Professional boxing was illegal in Canada during the London Prize Ring era but fights still took place outside major towns in barns and farmers' fields. The first universally recognized world boxing champion from Canada was George Dixon a black man from Halifax, Nova Scotia. Despite its relatively small population this country has produced many world class pugilists in both the pro and amateur ranks.

=== Curling ===
Curling, a sport that earned Olympic status in 1998, arrived with Scottish soldiers in the 1750s. the Royal Caledonian Curling Club in Scotland standardized the rules in the 1830s. It involves sliding a 42-pound teapot-shaped granite curling stone by its handle toward a goal painted on the ice, with players using brooms to alter its course. The sweeping removes debris, and warms the surface, creating a hydroplane-like effect. By 1903 Winnipeg had become the world's curling capital of an intensely competitive winter sport played throughout Canada.

=== Baseball and cricket ===
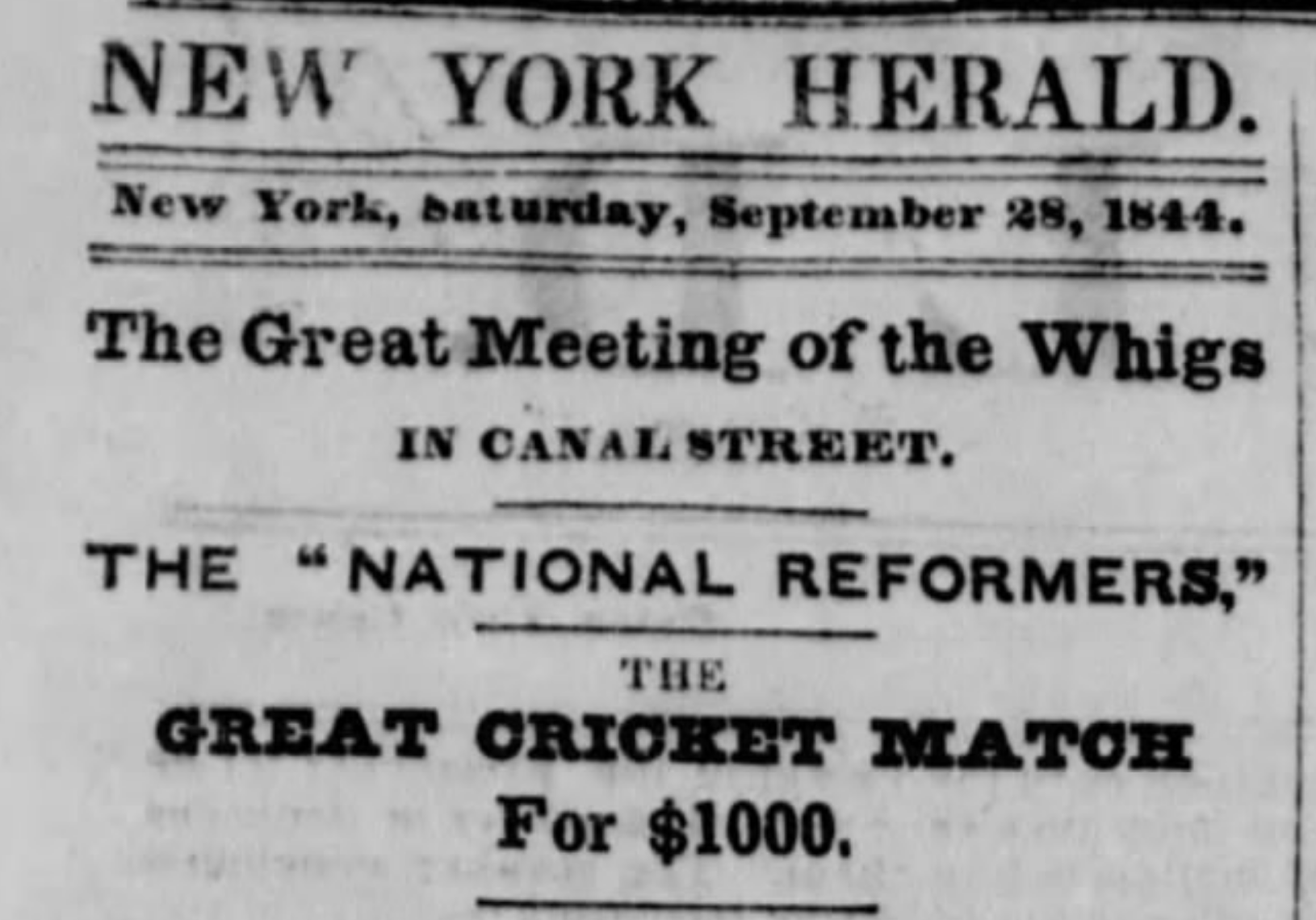
The first international cricket match took place in 1844 between the United States and Canada in New York City.

Cricket never caught on, despite efforts by an imperial-minded elite to promote the game as a way of identifying with the British Empire. Linked to upper class Canadian elites, the game never became popular with the general public. Despite once being named as a national sport by the first Prime Minister, John A. Macdonald, the sport declined due to the 19th-century rise of baseball, and being handicapped by the short summer season. During the First World War, Canadian units stationed in Britain played baseball, not cricket.

In modern times, immigration from cricket-playing countries has seen a minor resurgence of the sport in Canada.

=== Ultimate and disc sports (Frisbee) ===
In Canada, organized disc sports began in the early 1970s, with promotional efforts from Irwin Toy (Frisbee distributor for Canada), the Canadian Open Frisbee Championships, Toronto (1972–1985), the Vancouver Open Frisbee Championships (1974–1976). Freestyle, double disc court, disc guts, ultimate and disc golf, became disc sports first events. The first Canadian Ultimate Championships (CUC) were held, for the open division, in Ottawa 1987, produced by Marcus Brady and Brian Guthrie. OCUA subsequently hosted the 1993, 1999, 2002 and 2011 Canadian Ultimate Championships.

== Women ==
While sports are considered a high priority in Canadian culture, girls and women did not traditionally partake in sport at the same rate as men for a variety of reasons. For a time this included the belief that their engagement in sports at the physical level could pose serious dangers to girl's and women's health. Better science, research, education, and changing social attitudes, as well as technological advancements, eventually enabled girls and women to participate more often and for longer periods making sport for girls and women more attractive, as did new legislation focused on creating better access and more opportunities. In some cases during the late-to-early 20th century, there were regional differences in rules codes for girls' and women's games which further complicated the growth process, such as in the case of girls' and women's basketball. In the case of female basketball, Canada's eastern provinces emphasized a more feminine "girls rule" game of basketball, while the Western provinces preferred rules which were identical to the men's game. A set of uniform rules codes for female basketball did not development until a later period in the administration of the women's game both nationally and internationally. In the case of sports which are female equivalents, growth in the girls' and women's domain in Canada has occurred more slowly than in comparison to their male counterparts, while sports created specifically for female competitors like the sports of synchronized swimming, netball, and ringette, have had a different history and trajectory altogether.

Slower growth in the equivalents has been observed and is believed to have been affected by a series of factors. For example, girls and women historically have low levels of interest and participation in sport. As a result, there have been few women in leadership positions in academic administration, student affairs or athletics, which some believe is a crucial factor limiting the growth in participation by the female population. It has also been pointed out that there are fewer women coaches in women's sports than men. In regards to mass media, it has historically emphasized men's sports as a demonstration of masculinity very strongly. Some have interpreted this media presentation as suggesting that within a societal context, women who have been seriously interested in sports are "crossing gender lines", a development to which the male sports establishment has responded to in an actively hostile manner. Another initial impediment to female athletic participation included its dismissal by staunch feminists who deemed the subject as unworthy of their support.

While women's participation in sport began slowly, it eventually began accelerating after 1980. The Fitness and Amateur Sport Act of 1961 (Bill C-131) and the report of the Royal Commission on the Status of Women in 1970 marked major advances. Perhaps the most critical development came in 1974, when Marion Lay and the federal government's Fitness and Amateur Sport Branch (FASB) sponsored a National Conference on Women and Sport. The event brought together coaches, academic administrators, and athletes to talk over the issues raised by the Royal Commission, and to chart a way forward. Even so, there was no way to monitor the process and implement the recommendations. The 1980s accelerated the movement forward. The Sport Canada's Women's Program took place in 1980, the Female Athlete Conference in 1981, the Women in Sport program took lace in 1981, and the Constitution Act of 1982 took place soon thereafter.

In the beginning, women's progress in Canadian sport was an uphill battle. Canadian women first had to counter the widespread notion that women's bodies were so restricted and delicate that vigorous physical activity was dangerous. These notions where first challenged by the "new woman" around 1900. These women started with bicycling. During this period of history, women became increasingly engaged in education, work, and suffrage.

The 1920s marked a breakthrough for women, including working-class young women in addition to the pioneering middle class sportswomen. The Women's Amateur Federation of Canada (WAAF) was formed in 1926 to make possible new opportunities, particularly in international competition. The WAAF worked to rebut the stereotype that vigorous physical activity and intense competition was "unwomanly". One tactic was to set up a system of medical supervision for all women athletes. The WAAF forged an alliance with the Amateur Athletic Union of Canada and its vice-president J. Howard Crocker, which then allowed Canadian women to compete in the Olympics and the British Empire Games.

=== 1920s ===
Many barriers in women's sport fell in the 1920s. The Edmonton Grads became the world champions of women's basketball in 1924, the first Canadian women participated in the Olympics, and women sportswriters such as Phyllis Griffiths were hired to cover their feats on the sports pages.

=== 1930s ===
The 1930s involved a number of setbacks such as when critics recommended non-competitive athletic activities as the recreation most suited to women.

In Canadian women's ice hockey, the Preston Rivulettes overcame the difficulty of obtaining adequate ice time for practice and the challenge of raising adequate funds from their small fan base. The Rivulettes dominated women's ice hockey in the 1930s, winning ten provincial championships and four of the six Dominion championships. With money short during the Great Depression in Canada, women's sport took another hit.

=== 1940s ===
Figure skater Barbara Ann Scott was a stand out female athlete of the 1940s, as the 1948 Olympic champion, a two-time World champion (1947–1948), and a four-time Canadian national champion (1944–46, 48) in ladies' singles. She was very heavily covered by the media. However, it focused less on her sportsmanship and athletic achievements and more on her beauty and her "sweetheart" image.

=== Post WWII ===
After 1939, the hyper-masculinity of the Second World War blocked women's opportunities.

During the Second World War, women's ice hockey largely disappeared. After the war, the "back-to-the-family" conservatism is considered by some largely resulted in women's sports disappearing into the shadows.

=== 1970s ===
The feminists of the 1970s rarely helped promote women's breakthroughs in sports. Nevertheless, more and more women became engaged in aerobics and organized sport.

=== 1980s ===
Women increasingly became more active after 1980. In 1981 Abby Hoffman, a former Olympian, was named director general of Sport Canada. Its "Policy on Women's Sport" called for "equality". The Amateur Athletic Union of Canada (AAU) became more supportive.

Canadian court cases covered issues relating to Canadian women's rights to participate in sport. In the provinces, human rights commissions addressed dozens of sport-related equity cases for women. Gender barriers in sports became a political topic, as shown by the Minister's Task Force Report in 1992 and the landmark decision of the Canadian Sport Council to include gender equity quotas in their operating principles.

=== 1990s ===
New problems emerged for sportswomen trying to achieve equal status with sportsmen: raising money, attracting popular audiences, and winning sponsors.

Harrigan, (2003) reviews the emergence of women's athletics in higher education during 1961–2001. The establishment of the National Fitness and Amateur Sport Advisory Council helped women's intercollegiate sports to gain momentum. Simultaneously there was a rise in the proportion of women in the student bodies, which enhanced the visibility of their sports. Women concentrated on organizing their sports and raising the consciousness of both male and female students. In 1969, the Canadian Women's Intercollegiate Athletic Union was formed to oversee events and sanction national championships.In 1978 it merged with the Canadian Intercollegiate Athletic Union.

== Multi-sports Games ==
=== Olympics ===
Canadians have participated in the Olympics since 1900.

The 1976 Summer Olympics, officially known as the "Games of the XXI Olympiad," held in Montréal, was the first Olympics in Canada. The entire province of Quebec prepared for the games and associated activities, generating a resurgence of interest in amateur athletics across the province. The spirit of Québec nationalism helped motivate the organizers; however, the city went $1 billion into debt. The Games helped introduce Quebec (and Canada) to the rest of the world. Nadia Comaneci's outstanding performances in gymnastics helped popularize the sport in Canada.

Like Montreal, Calgary, Alberta, which hosted the 1988 Winter Olympics, used the event to reposition itself as world-class city.

The 2010 Winter Olympics, officially known as the XXI Olympic Winter Games, was held from February 12 to February 28, 2010, in Vancouver, British Columbia, and nearby venues.

=== Commonwealth Games ===
Canada hosted the first ever British Empire Games in 1930 in Hamilton, Ontario, as well as the 1954 British Empire and Commonwealth Games in Vancouver, British Columbia, the 1978 Commonwealth Games in Edmonton, Alberta, and the 1994 Commonwealth Games in Victoria, British Columbia. Halifax, Nova Scotia had been nominated to host the 2014 Commonwealth Games before it withdrew its bid due to unacceptably high cost projections.

=== Pan American Games ===
Canada hosted three Pan American Games. Winnipeg hosted the 1967 Pan American Games and the 1999 Pan American Games. Toronto hosted the 2015 Pan American Games. The Toronto 2015 Pan American Games was the largest multi-sport event hosted in Canada in terms of athletes competing.

== See also ==
- Heritage Minutes
- History of sport

== Bibliography ==
=== Surveys ===
- Bouchier, Nancy For the love of the game: Amateur sport in small-town Ontario, 1838-1895. (2003)
- Brown, D., 'The Northern Character Theme and Sport in Nineteenth Century Canada', Canadian Journal of History of Sport, 1989, 20(1), 47–56.
- Coakley, Jay and Peter Donnelly, Sports in Society: Issues and Controversies, (2003), 576pp
- Harvey, Jean and H. Cantelon, eds. Not Just A Game: Essays in Canadian Sport Sociology, (1988)
- Howell, Colin D. Blood, Sweat, and Cheers: Sport and the Making of Modern Canada. (2001).
- Kidd, Bruce. The Struggle For Canadian Sport. (1996).
- Lupien, Philippe-Antoine. "Sport and public service in Canada: The roots of the inherent bonds between the Canadian Broadcasting Corporation/Radio-Canada and the Olympic Games." International Communication Gazette 79.2 (2017): 120–134.
- Macintosh, D. and D. Whitson. The Game Planners: Transforming Canada's Sport System. (1990). excerpts and text search
- Macintosh, Donald. Sport and politics in Canada: Federal government involvement since 1961 (2003) excerpts and text search
- Metcalfe, Alan. Canada Learns To Play: The Emergence of Organized Sport, 1807-1914. (1987).
- Metcalfe, Alan, 'The Meaning of Amateurism: A Case Study of Canadian Sport,1884-1970', Journal of History of Sport, 1995, 26(2): 33–48.
- Morrow, Don, and Kevin Wamsley. Sport in Canada: A History. (2005). 318 pp. ISBN 978-0-19-541996-2. online review
- Morrow, Don, 'The Myth of the Hero in Canadian Sport History', Canadian Journal of History of Sport, 1992, 2:72–83.
- Robidoux, Michael A. "Imagining a Canadian Identity through Sport: A Historical Interpretation of Lacrosse and Hockey" The Journal of American Folklore, Vol. 115, No. 456, Special Issue: Folklore in Canada (Spring, 2002), pp. 209–225 in JSTOR
- Schrodt, Barbara, 'Problems of Periodization in Canadian Sport History', Canadian Journal of History of Sport, 1990, 21(1): 65–76.
- Smith, Michael, 'Sport and Society: Towards a Synthetic History', Acadiensis, 1989, 18(2): 150–158.
- Wall, Karen L. Game Plan: A Social History of Sport in Alberta (2012)

=== Race, ethnicity and gender ===
- Ballem, Charles, "Missing From The Canadian Sport Scene: Native Athletes," Canadian Journal of History of Sport, 1983, 14(2): 33–39.
- Blair, Kelsey. "Screen and Roll: Transmissions of Embodied Knowledge through Canadian Women’s Basketball History." Canadian Theatre Review 169 (2017): 20–25.
- Burstyn, V. The Rites of Men: Manhood, Politics, and The Culture of Sport. (1999).
- Dauphinais, Paul R., 'A Class Act: French-Canadians In Organized Sport, 1840-1910', International Journal of the History of Sport, 1992 7(3): 432–442.
- Dallaire, Christine, 'Sport's Impact On The Francophoneness of the Alberta Francophone Games', Ethnologies, 2003, 25(2): 33–58.
- Demers, Guylaine and Lorraine Greaves, eds. Playing it Forward: 50 Years of Women and Sport in Canada (2014). online review
- Donnelly, Peter and Jean Harvey, 'Class and Gender: Intersections in Sport and Physical Activity' in Philip White and Kevin Young (eds), Sport and Gender in Canada, (1999), pp. 40–64.
- Gillespie, Greg, 'Sport and "Masculinities" In Early-Nineteenth-Century Ontario: The British Travellers' Image." Ontario History, 2002, 92(2), 113-26.
- Hall, M. Ann, 'Rarely Have We Asked Why: Reflections on Canadian Women's Experience in Sport', Atlantis, 1980, 6(1): 51-60.
- Hall, M. Ann. The Girl and the Game: A History of Women's Sport in Canada. (2002).
- Lathrop, Anna H, 'Contested Terrain: Gender and "Movement" In Ontario Elementary Physical Education, 1940-70', Ontario History, 2002, 94(2): 165–182.
- Lenskyj, Helen, 'Whose Sport? Whose Traditions? Canadian Women and Sport in the Twentieth Century', International Journal of the History of Sport, 1992, 9(1): 141–150.
- Lenskyj, Helen, 'Common Sense and Physiology: North American Medical Views On Women and Sport, 1890-1930', Canadian Journal of History of Sport, 1990,21(1): 49–64.
- Metcalfe, Alan. 'Sports In Nineteenth-Century French Canada: The Case of Montreal, 1800-1914', Loisir et Societe/Society and Leisure, 1983: 105–120.
- Tester, Jim, ed. (1986). Sports Pioneers: A History of the Finnish-Canadian Amateur Sports Federation 1906-1986. Alerts AC Historical Committee. ISBN 0-9692405-0-3.

=== Specific sports ===
- Barclay, James A. Golf in Canada: A History (1992)
- Boyd, Bill. All Roads Lead to Hockey: Reports from Northern Canada to the Mexican Border. (2006). 240 pp
- Charters, David A. The Chequered Past: Sports Car Racing and Rallying in Canada, 1951 - 1991 (2007) excerpt and text search
- Dryden, Ken. "Soul on Ice: A Century of Canadian Hockey." Beaver(Dec 2000/Jan 2001), Vol. 80, Issue 6 in EBSCO
- Dryden, Ken, and Roy MacGregor. Home Game: Hockey and Life in Canada (1989)
- Fisher, D.B. Lacrosse: A History of the Game. (2002).
- Goodman, Jeffrey. Huddling Up: The Inside Story of the Canadian Football League. (1981). 249 pp.
- Gruneau, Richard. Hockey night in Canada: Sport, identities and cultural politics, (1993)
- Hollan, Andrew C., 'Playing in the Neutral Zone: Meanings and uses of ice hockey in the Canada-U.S. Borderlands, 1895-1915', American Review of Canadian Studies, 2004, 34(1).
- Howell, Colin D. Northern Sandlots: A Social History of Maritime Baseball. (1995).
- Hughes-Fuller, Helen Patricia. "The Good Old Game: Hockey, Nostalgia, Identity." PhD dissertation U. of Alberta 2002. 258 pp. DAI 2004 64(7): 2496-A. DANQ81202 Fulltext: ProQuest Dissertations & Theses
- Humber, William. Diamonds of the North: A Concise History of Baseball in Canada (1995)
- Leonardo, Tony and Zagoria, Adam co-authored "Ultimate: The First Four Decades," publ. by Ultimate History, Inc., 2005, ISBN 0-9764496-0-9
- Lorenz, Stacy L. Media, Culture, and the Meanings of Hockey: Constructing a Canadian Hockey World, 1896-1907 (Taylor & Francis, 2017).
- Manore, Jean L., and Dale G. Miner. The Culture of Hunting in Canada, (2006)
- Maxwell, Doug. Canada Curls: The Illustrated History of Curling in Canada, (2002) excerpt and text search
- Moore, Mark. Saving the Game: Pro Hockey's Quest to Raise its Game from Crisis to New Heights. (2nd ed. 2006). 420 pp.
- O'Brien, Steve. The Canadian Football League: The Phoenix of Professional Sports Leagues (2nd ed. 2005) excerpt and text search
- Poulterab, Gillian. " Snowshoeing and Lacrosse: Canada's Nineteenth-Century 'National Games'," Culture, Sport, Society (2003) 6#2 pp pages 293-320 DOI: 10.1080/14610980312331271639
- Stebbins, Robert A. Canadian Football: The View from the Helmet. London, Ont.: Center for Social and Humanistic Studies, 1987. 207pp
- Stubbs, Dave, and Neal Portnoy. Our Game: The History of Hockey in Canada (2006) excerpt and text search
- Wong, John Chi-Kit. "The Development of Professional Hockey and the Making of the National Hockey League." PhD dissertation U. of Maryland, College Park 2001. 432 pp. DAI 2002 62(9): 3152-A. DA3024988 Fulltext: ProQuest Dissertations & Theses

=== Primary sources ===
- Mott, Morris, ed. Sports in Canada: Historical Readings, (1989).
