= Stancil =

Stancil is both a given name and surname. Notable people with the name include:

- Felicia Stancil (born 1995), American bicyclist
- Stancil Johnson (1933–2021), psychiatrist and frisbee enthusiast
- T. J. Stancil (born 1982), football player
- Will Stancil, American political candidate

== See also ==
- Stancil, Missouri
- Stancil, South Yorkshire
- Stancils Chapel, North Carolina
- Stencil, a graphic design technique
