= Ultimate Canada =

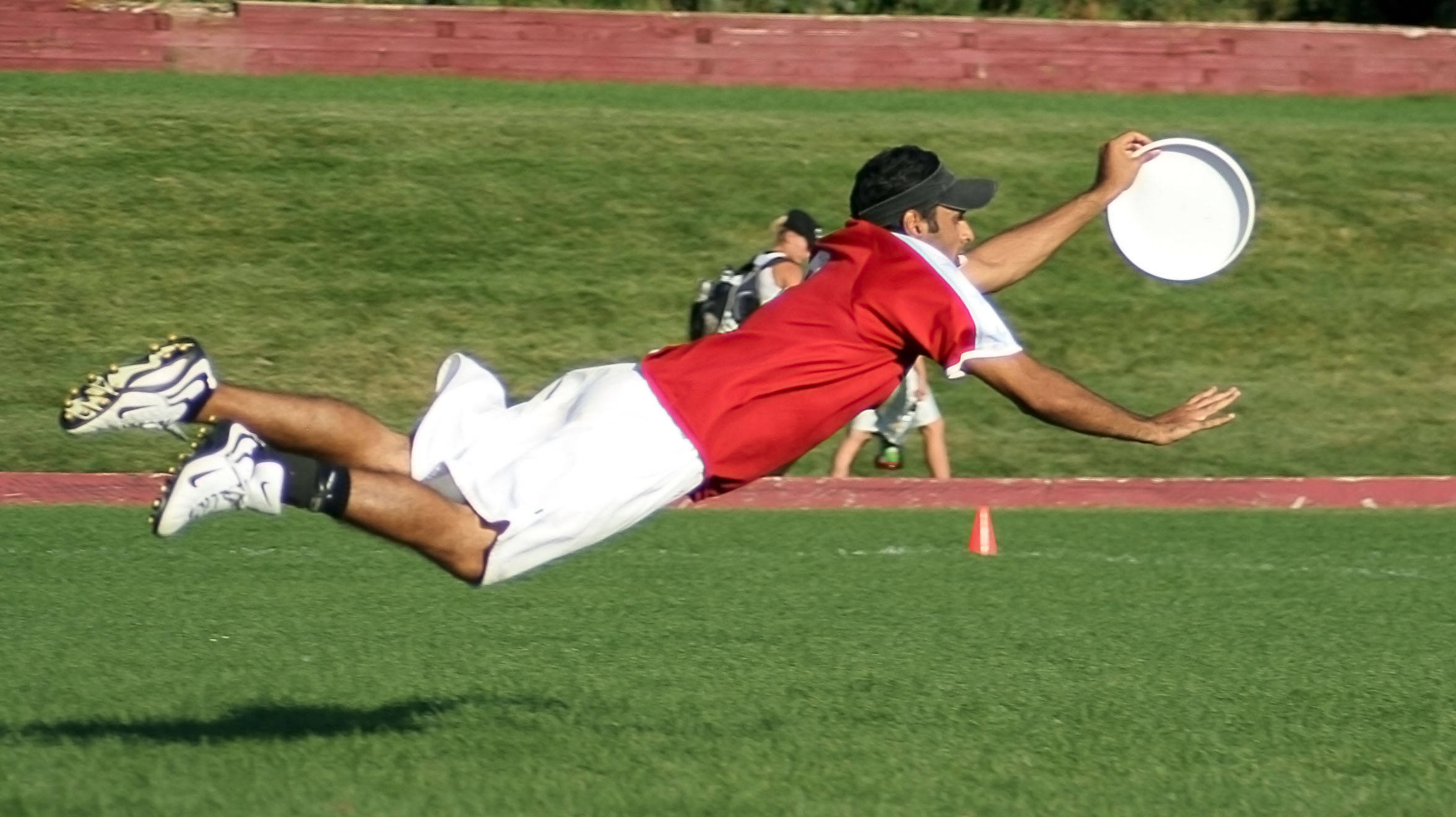
- Sport: Ultimate (sport)
- Jurisdiction: National
- Founded: 1993
- Affiliation: World Flying Disc Federation
- CEO: Danny Saunders

Official website
- www.canadianultimate.com
- (Canada)

Ultimate Canada is a not-for-profit organization that serves as the governing body of the sport of Ultimate (also known as "Ultimate Frisbee") in Canada. It runs the Canadian Ultimate Championships (CUC) and Canadian University Ultimate Championship (CUUC) series.

Canadian Ultimate Championships (CUC)

Each August, teams from across the country travel to the Canadian Ultimate Championships (CUC) to compete for the national title in 7 different divisions: mixed, open, women's, junior open, junior women, masters open and masters women. Teams compete at this seven-day tournament not only to determine the national champion but also to determine who will represent Canada at the next world championships.

From 2016 to 2019, the mixed divisions were held separately from the remaining divisions.

In 2022, the format was changed again with the three Masters divisions at their event, the three senior divisions at their event, and the two Junior divisions at their own event.

Canadian University Ultimate Championships (CUUC)

The CUUC started in 1995 and brings university teams from across the country to compete in the open & the women's division. Each fall Ultimate Canada operates two competitions for university Ultimate teams in Canada: the Canadian University Ultimate Championships (CUUC) and the Canadian Eastern University Ultimate Championships (CEUUC). The CEUUC began in 1998 and brings university teams primarily from Ontario and Quebec together to compete in the open & the women's division.

== History ==
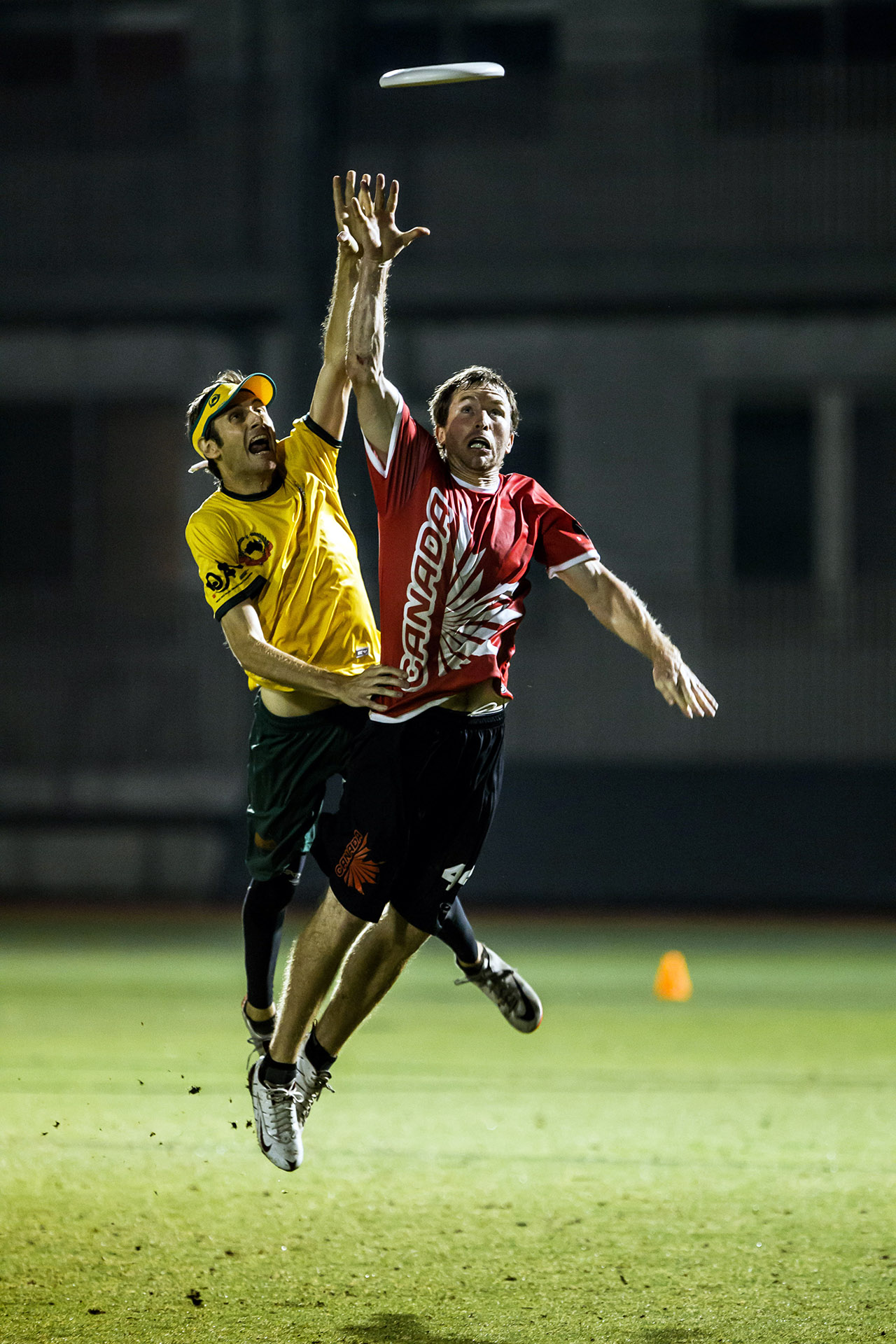
Australia vs Canada at 2012 WUGC in Japan

In 2010, the Toronto Ultimate Club released a documentary film, 30 years in 30 minutes, that traces the club's history as well as the history of ultimate Frisbee in Canada. Not far removed from the invention of ultimate in the late 1960s, Ken Westerfield and Jim Kenner (the founder and CEO of Discraft) ran the Canadian Open Frisbee Championships with guts, disc golf, freestyle, ultimate and individual field events in the early 1970s at the Canadian National Exhibition. In 1975, they moved the tournament to the Toronto Islands. They also participated in several Frisbee show tours across Canada for Irwin Toy (Wham-O licensee and Frisbee distributor for Canada). Each year their show tours would end in Vancouver where they would set up the Vancouver Open Frisbee Championships on Kitsilano Beach and Stanley Park (1974-1977). This is where Jim Brown, Bill King, and John Anthony of freestyle fame made their first competitive appearances. From these championships and the presence of these touring professional Frisbee players Ken Westerfield, Jim Kenner, and Bob Blakely of Irwin Toy, Toronto became the hub of Frisbee activity in Canada.

Ken Westerfield initiated the Toronto Ultimate Club (TUC). The Toronto Ultimate Club is one of ultimate's oldest leagues. Ken Westerfield lived in the Beaches in southeast Toronto, this is where he would set up shop, taking his Frisbees down to the beach on a grassy area next to the boardwalk called Kew Beach and would play with whoever wanted to join him. Four of the original ultimate players, Ken Westerfield, Jim Lim, Stuart Godfrey, and Patrick Chartrand and others played a pickup game of ultimate Frisbee one afternoon with Westerfield outlining the rules. For this group, it became a regular thing and the group began to grow. In 1979, Westerfield using his local tournament player contact list, started weekly ultimate pick-up games in the Beaches on the same grassy area next to the boardwalk on Wednesday evenings. Christopher Lowcock, introduced to disc sports by his brother Les, became part of this group. Lowcock, Westerfield, and the others would recruit more players as they passed along the boardwalk, Wednesday's ultimate pick-up was becoming very popular.

In 1979, Westerfield sent team invitations to Wards Island, West End, North Toronto and Westerfield's team the Beaches, to join the Toronto Ultimate League. These were the first four teams, each taking turns hosting the league games at their home locations. The league starting night was at Kew Beach. These were the very first disc ultimate league games in the city of Toronto, the beginning of the Toronto Ultimate League (Club), and the first ultimate league in Canada. The Toronto Ultimate League developed into the Toronto Ultimate Club (TUC), which now has 3300 active members and over 250 Teams playing the year round.

The first Canadian Ultimate Championships (CUC) was held, for the open division, Ottawa in 1987, produced by Marcus Brady and Brian Guthrie. OCUA subsequently hosted the 1993, 1999, 2002 and 2011 Canadian Ultimate Championships.

Canada has been ranked number one in the Ultimate World Rankings several times since 1998 in all the Ultimate Divisions (including Open and Women's) according to the World Flying Disc Federation.

In 2013, as a founding partner, the Toronto Ultimate Club presented Canada's first semi-professional Ultimate team, the Toronto Rush, to the American Ultimate Disc League (AUDL). They went undefeated 18-0 and won the AUDL Championships. In 2014, the Montreal Royal and the Vancouver Riptide joined the AUDL. In 2015, the Ottawa Outlaws became the fourth Canadian team to compete in the AUDL, of 26 teams.

In 2015, the International Olympic Committee (IOC) granted full recognition to the World Flying Disc Federation (WFDF) for flying disc sports including ultimate.

== Timeline of National Ultimate Developments in Canada ==
- 1972-1985: Canadian Open Frisbee Championships, Toronto and Vancouver Open Frisbee Championships (1974-1977) introduced Frisbee and the beginning of competitive disc sports.
- 1975: Ultimate is played at the Canadian Open Frisbee Championships on Toronto Islands.
- 1977: Ultimate is played at the Vancouver Open Frisbee Championships in Stanley Park, Vancouver, BC.
- 1980: Toronto League started
- 1986: Vancouver and Ottawa Leagues started
- 1987: First Canadian Ultimate Championships - open division only
- 1987: Winnipeg Ultimate League begun by Jean-Luc Forest and Mike Jones. The first full season in 1988 had three teams and roughly 14 people.
- 1988: MODS (first Provincial Sports Organization) founded
- 1989: Women's Division added to Nationals
- 1991: WFDF World Ultimate Club Championships in Toronto
- 1993: Canadian Ultimate Players Association begins
- 1994: Juniors Division added to Nationals
- 1995: Masters Division added to Nationals. First Annual University National Championships - open & women's divisions.
- 1997: WFDF World Ultimate Club Championships in Vancouver
- 1998: Team Canada Masters wins first gold medal for Canada at Worlds (WUGC) - quickly followed by Gold in Mixed and Open. Since 1998, Canada has been ranked number one in the World, for several years in all divisions, by the WFDF World Ultimate Ranking.
- 1999: Mixed Division added to Canadian Ultimate Championships
- 2002: First Canadian team to win USAU (UPA) Championship: Furious George (Vancouver)
- 2008: WFDF World Ultimate & guts Championships in Vancouver
- 2010: Canadian Ultimate Players Association changes its name to Ultimate Canada.
- 2011: Ultimate Canada Hall of Fame is created to honor pioneers, players, and leaders in the sport.
- 2012: Junior Division at CUC splits from Mixed into Junior Open and Junior Women's Divisions.
- 2013: The Junior Open and Junior Women's divisions at CUC split away from the adult events competition turning CUC into a 7-day tournament.
- 2013: As a founding partner, the Toronto Ultimate Club presented Canada's first semi-professional Ultimate team, the Toronto Rush, to the American Ultimate Disc League (AUDL).
- 2015: WFDF World Ultimate Rankings by country. Canada is ranked number 2 out of 44 countries.
- 2015: The International Olympic Committee (IOC) granted full recognition to the World Flying Disc Federation (WFDF), (of which Ultimate Canada is a member) for flying disc sports including ultimate

== Toronto Ultimate Club ==
Ultimate training at York University.

The Toronto Ultimate Club was founded in 1980. It is Canada's oldest ultimate league with teams participating every season, on most days of the week and various fields (indoor and outdoor) throughout the year. It is a not-for-profit organization that was incorporated in 1995. The club consists of three full-time managers, a strong board of directors that represents the membership, and over 100 volunteers.

== London Ultimate Club ==
London Ultimate Club (LUC) is a growing league in London, Ontario. The club was founded in 1998 and incorporated as a not-for-profit in 2008. The club runs outdoor leagues in the summer and indoor leagues in the fall and winter.

== Ottawa Carleton Ultimate Association ==
Ultimate is popular in Ottawa, Ontario. OCUA is currently one of the two largest leagues in Canada (alongside the Vancouver Ultimate League), and for a time was the largest ultimate league in the world. In 2004, there were 354 teams in the summer league and approximately 5000 members.

== Vancouver Ultimate League ==
The Vancouver Ultimate League has around 5300 active members who play throughout the year. Its primary focus is recreational play. It also hosts clinics and introductory programs for new players and supports several elite club teams that compete in provincial, national and international championships.

== Calgary Ultimate Association ==
Founded in 2004, the CUA coordinates year-round leagues, annual tournaments, a growing juniors program, and outreach efforts to promote the sport of ultimate frisbee within Calgary and surrounding areas. Each year in June the CUA hosts the annual Ho-Down and Slo-Down tournament that draws more than 30 teams from across Western Canada and the United States. Calgary Juniors Ultimate hosts an annual tournament and youth league.

== Windsor Ultimate ==
Windsor Ultimate in Windsor, Ontario since 2007. In 2010, Windsor Ultimate officially became a non-profit entity in the province of Ontario, this move allowed the organization to better situate itself as a legitimate sports league in Southern Ontario.

== Montreal Ultimate ==
The Montreal Ultimate Association has enjoyed incredible growth and has become one of the largest Ultimate associations in Canada. Although the sport first came to Montreal in 1984, the 1993 season truly signaled the start of an Ultimate league that eventually became the association we know today. In 1997, players felt the need to create a non-profit organization that they called Association de Ultimate de Montréal.

== Canadian Ultimate Hall of Fame ==
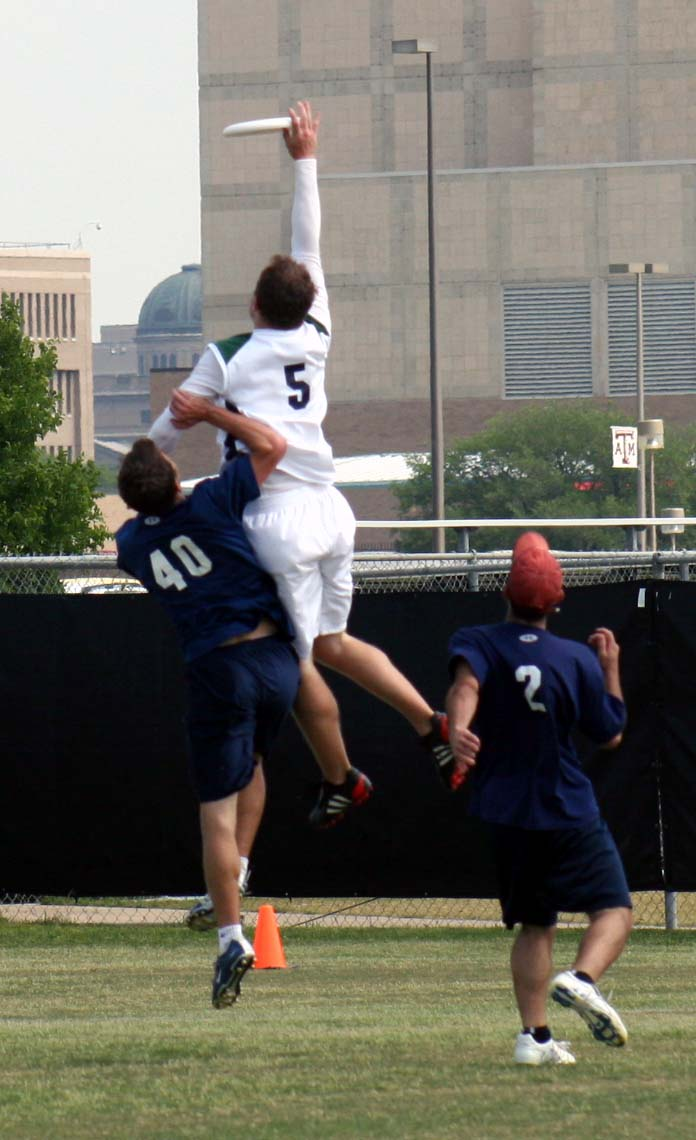

Hall of Fame Inductees 2011 was the inaugural year. Ultimate Canada created the Hall of Fame to recognize contributions from pioneers in the sport.

Builders

- Lorne Beckman (2011)
- Brian Gisel (2011)
- John Harris (2011)
- Scott Lewis (2011)
- Chris Lowcock (2011)
- Ken Westerfield (2011)
- Dean Wright (2011)
- Jim Brown (2013)
- Jeff Malmgren (2014)
- Donnie McPhee (2016)

Players

- Adam "Elvis" Berson (2011)
- Grant Burns (2011)
- Jen Catalano (2011)
- Anja Haman (2011)
- Steev Limin (2011)
- Al "Al-Bob" Nichols (2011)
- Gillian Scarfe (2011)
- Dante Anderson (2012)
- Andrew Lugsdin (2012)
- Leslie Calder (2013)
- Alex Hughes (2014)
- Monica Kerr-Coster (2014)
- Cheryl Claibourne (2016)
- Jeff Cruickshank (2017)
- Kirk Savage (2017)
- Evan Wood (2018)

Teams

- GOO/Prime (2011)
- Furious George (2011)
- See Jane Run (2012)
- Nomads (2013)
- Chaos (2014)
- The Calgary Cynics (2016)
- Masters of Flying Objects (MOFO) (2017)

Founders

- Marcus Brady (2011)
- Brian Guthrie (2011)
- Keith Whyte (2011)

== Leagues and Associations ==
Saskatchewan Saskatoon Ultimate Disc-sport Society Saskatoon, SK

Alberta

Calgary Ultimate Association Calgary, AB

Edmonton Ultimate Players Association Edmonton, AB

British Columbia

Vancouver Ultimate League Vancouver, BC

Victoria Ultimate Players Society Victoria, BC

Kamloops Ultimate League Society Kamloops, BC

Manitoba

Winnipeg, MB

Nova Scotia

Halifax Ultimate Recreational League Halifax, NS

Ontario

Ottawa-Carleton Ultimate Association Ottawa, ON

Toronto Ultimate Club Toronto, ON

Sudbury Ultimate Club Sudbury, ON

Kingston Ultimate Kingston, ON

Guelph Ultimate Players Association Guelph, ON

Waterloo Disc Sports Waterloo Region, ON

London Ultimate Club London, ON

Windsor Ultimate Windsor, ON

Durham Ultimate Club Durham, ON

Peterborough Ultimate League Peterborough, ON

Quebec

Fédération québécoise d'ultimate PQ

Association d'Ultimate de Sherbrooke Sherbrooke, PQ

UltimAction, Pour une relève du ultimate PQ

Ultimate PQ, Le film PQ

Saskatchewan

Saskatchewan Ultimate Players Association SK

Saskatoon Ultimate Disc-Sport Society Saskatoon, SK

Regina Ultimate Flying Disc Club Regina, SK

Newfoundland and Labrador

Ultimate Newfoundland and Labrador NL

Men's Avalon Ultimate League St. John's, NL

St. John's Women's Ultimate Recreation League St. John's, NL

Mile Zero Ultimate St. John's, NL

== See also ==
- Flying disc freestyle
- Ultimate (sport)
- Flying disc
- Guts (game)
- Flying disc games
- USA Ultimate

== Books on ultimate and disc sports ==
- Palmeri, Jim; A Chain of Events, The Origin & Evolution of Disc Golf Paperback, Unabridged (2015); ISBN 978-0-9774517-0-8
- Leonardo, Tony, and Zagoria, Adam co-authored "Ultimate: The First Four Decades," publ. by Ultimate History, Inc., 2005, ISBN 0-9764496-0-9
- Tips, Charles; Frisbee by the Masters Celestial Arts, Millbrae, California (March 1977); ISBN 978-0-89087-142-3
- Stancil, E. D., and Johnson, M.D. Frisbee, A Practitioner's Manual and Definitive Treatise Workman Publishing Company, New York (July 1975); ISBN 978-0-911104-53-0
