= Dwight M. Sabin =

American politician (1843–1902)

Dwight Sabin
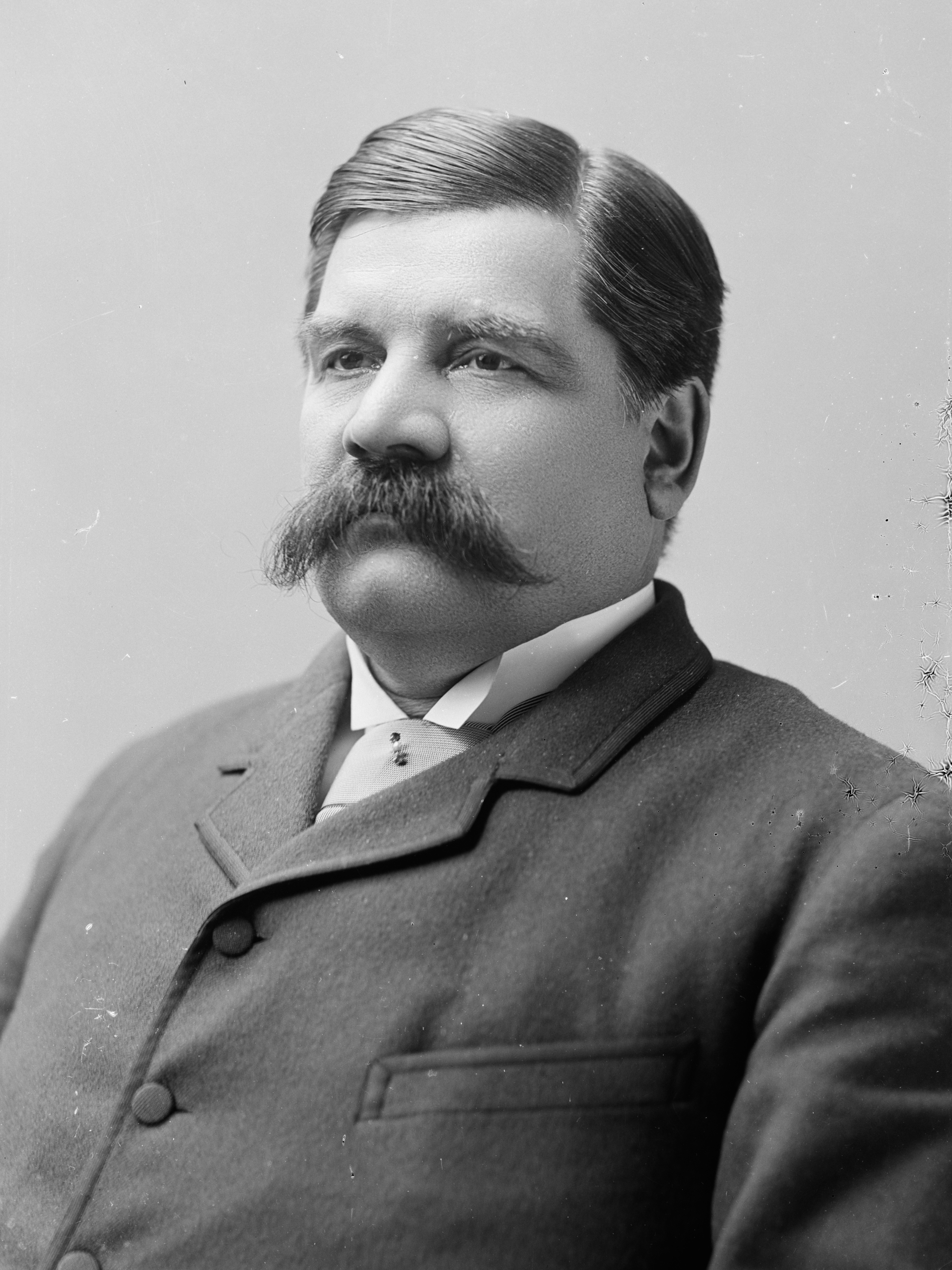
- Sabin c. 1873–1890

Chair of the Republican National Committee
- In office December 21, 1883 – June 6, 1884
- Preceded by: Marshall Jewell
- Succeeded by: Benjamin Jones

United States Senator from Minnesota
- In office March 4, 1883 – March 3, 1889
- Preceded by: William Windom
- Succeeded by: William D. Washburn

Member of the Minnesota House of Representatives
- In office January 8, 1878 – March 3, 1883
- Constituency: 22nd district (1878–1883); 24th district (1883)

Member of the Minnesota Senate
- In office January 3, 1871 – January 5, 1874
- Constituency: 2nd district (1871–1872); 22nd district (1872–1874)

Personal details
- Born: Dwight May Sabin; April 25, 1843 Marseilles, Illinois, U.S.
- Died: December 22, 1902 (aged 59) Chicago, Illinois, U.S.
- Resting place: Fairview Cemetery, Stillwater, Minnesota
- Party: Republican

Military service
- Allegiance: United States • Union
- Branch/service: Union Army
- Battles/wars: American Civil War

Dwight May Sabin (April 25, 1843 – December 22, 1902) was an American politician who served as U.S. Senator from Minnesota and in the Minnesota Legislature. He is known for the business ventures of Seymour, Sabin & Co. and the Northwestern Car Company, highly successful enterprises dependent on the highly profitable prison labor contracts he had negotiated with the Minnesota State Government in the 1870s. His election to federal office, in 1883, came following an infamous prolonged dead-lock in the Minnesota State Senate, during which incumbent Senator William Windom failed of re-election following "the worst campaign in the known history of the state."

== Early life ==
Dwight May Sabin, the elder of the two sons of Horace Carver Sabin and Maria Elizabeth Webster (originally of Fredonia, New York), was born in 1843, in Marseilles, Illinois, where he spent his childhood years.

Horace, Dwight's father, of Windham County, Connecticut, had moved west to establish his own property near Marseille, Illinois, platted 1853 as a canal town in the expectation of the completion of the Illinois-Michigan Canal. Horace's enterprise was successful, but illness returned the Sabins to Connecticut by 1857, where the family moved into the Sabin's ancestral home, part of the original Connecticut New Roxbury Grant, and descended through the family from the area's earliest white settlers, circa 1686.

In 1862, following his grandfather's death, Sabin attended Phillips Academy, studying civil engineering and mathematics, leaving school after a year of coursework to enlist as a Union soldier in the American Civil War. A period review of his life and career from 1883 noted that he arrived at Gettysburg in July, 1863, "on the second day of the decisive and dreadful battle of the rebellion, at the very period when the only regiment from Minnesota in the Army of the Republic was behaving so gallantly on Cemetery Hill," but this Minnesota reference, and its supposed significance to Sabin, may simply have been a political nod to his recent election to the US Senate at the time of the piece's publication.

While in the Federal Army, Sabin served as aide to the "chief medical officer of General Pleasanton's Cavalry", until several months' "exposure in the field" brought on an unidentified pulmonary illness that took him from camp duty to a clerkship in "the Third Auditor's Office" (Auditor of the War Department) in the US Treasury Department in Washington, D.C.. When his father died in 1864 Sabin, just twenty, was discharged and returned to Connecticut to help his mother manage his father's estate. Sabin took on the management of the family property in Windham County, while his mother, accompanying his brother Jay, returned to Illinois to take on management of the Illinois farm. The next three years were spent "cutting his woodlands into lumber and disposing of the same". in Connecticut

In 1867 his doctor suggested Sabin relocate for the sake of his health. After spending time with his family in Illinois, he moved to Minnesota, where he settled in Stillwater and became involved in lumber and manufacturing interests.

== Seymour, Sabin & Co. and the Stillwater Prison ==
In 1868, Sabin embarked on a new business venture as the firm of Seymour, Sabin & Co. This new company was contracted with the State of Minnesota to leverage the labor force at the recently established Stillwater Prison.

The labor contract system at Minnesota's Stillwater prison had begun in 1859 with John B. Stevens, a manufacturer of windows and blinds, who had leased the prison workshop from the state, taking over the labor and paying what was then a generous seventy-five cents a day for each full-time worker. But Stevens was forced to declare bankruptcy when his mill burnt down in 1861, and George M. Seymour, a manufacturer of flour barrels, moved in and took over the prison contract, establishing "a wage for a day's work from each prisoner which was scaled to advance from thirty to forty-five cents over a five-year period." 1868 was the first year of record in which a warden protested the exploitative aspects of this system, arguing that, at the very least, "inmates be allowed to work for the benefit of the state rather than for private concerns." It is unclear whether the warden's protests were prompted by the formation of the new company, with Seymour bringing Sabin into the business, or if these protests prompted the formation of the new company. Whichever the case, Seymour, Sabin & Co. were swift to consolidate and expand their business venture. By 1871 the firm's sales had topped $135,000.

Initially the business manufactured doors, window sashes, cooperage (barrels) and the like, a logical progression from Sabin's lumber interests. In 1874 the firm expanded to include a foundry and boiler room, allowing for the production of agricultural implements. The firm began producing threshing machines in 1876, and soon could pride itself as the largest manufacturer of the world famous model "Minnesotan Chief" thresher. Profits topped three hundred thousand dollars by 1881. Sabin himself was described that year as a man "very suggestive of potential force, stored ready for use. He isn't much of a talker. His power is tangible."

By 1882, Sabin was the "prime organizer of the Northwestern Car Company, with capital of $5,000,000", (a coterie which included "'certain wealthy persons' representing large railroad interests") which then purchased Seymour, Sabin and Co., and elected Sabin president of this new business. With an additional almost twelve hundred civilians employed in the prison shops (constructed ...) as well as in and around the extensive yards and workshops that had proliferated outside the prison walls, Sabin appeared poised to take charge of a manufacturing operation at a scale beyond, at least, that ever imagined by the prison inspectors of 1884, who marched through the conglomeration of workshops declaring, ""It was never expected when the contract for prison labor was made, that the Manufacturing Co. of Seymour, Sabin & Co. would develop into the mammoth N.W. Manufacturing & Car Co."

But before Sabin could solidify his role at the summit of this behemoth, political events intervened. Incumbent Minnesota US Senator William Windom undermined his re-election campaign, and Sabin, unexpectedly, was put up as US Senator in his place. Resignation from active leadership of his new business venture would be a requirement for this new role.

== Political career ==
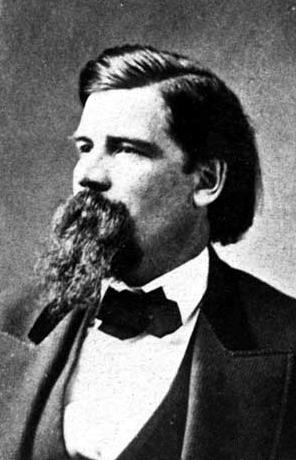
Dwight May Sabin in 1873, Minnesota State Senator from the 22nd District.

=== The Minnesota State House ===
Sabin first became politically active in Minnesota at the State level when he was elected to the Minnesota Senate in 1871, participating in Minnesota's 13th Legislative Session as representative of the Chisago, Kanabec, Pine, and Washington Counties.

In 1872 and 1873, following county reapportionment, he was re-elected, this time as State Senator, for District 22, Washington County (which included his new hometown, Stillwater). Following a break of four one-year terms, he returned to elected office in 1878, 1881, and 1882, as a member of the Minnesota House of Representatives (again for Washington County), winning election to both Minnesota's Houses of State a total of six times. Additionally during this period, Sabin served as a delegate to the Republican National Conventions of 1872, 1876, 1880, and 1884, and would sit as Committee chair of the Republican Party from 1883 to 1884. He appears to have been a popular, if not outstanding figure.

=== The 1883 State House Vote for US Senator ===
Sabin's election as US Senator in early 1883 followed the chaos that incumbent William Windom, a strong advocate of railroad regulation, had brought upon his own re-election. Following 1880, when Windom had effectively abandoned his place (and his Committees) in the US Senate for an unsuccessful presidential run, he did not return to retake his 'own' seat under ideal circumstances. By the 1883 elections, he had "antagonized in various ways a large number of his political associates," a loss of support that became amply clear in the first round of senatorial balloting. The New York Times, reporting in the aftermath, called it "the worst campaign in the known history of the state."

Windon, in DC as this vote was cast, immediately got on a train and headed back to his state, but it was too late. Over the next weeks, a series of indeterminate votes was cast. On January 31, 1883, Sabin's name appeared on the ballots for the first time, receiving a surprising 17 votes. Just two weeks later, on February 17, Sabin would receive 81 votes, and take the election.

=== United States Senator from Minnesota ===
Sabin served from March 4, 1883, to March 3, 1889, in the 48th, 49th, and 50th congresses, chairman, Committee to Examine Branches of the Civil Service (Forty-ninth Congress), Committee on Railroads (Fiftieth Congress), and was involved in legislation regarding railroads, veterans pensions and the development of the Soo Locks (where one lock is named in his honor).

In character, he "made no pretense to oratory, and was not known as a speech-making senator, but rather a hard working member in the interest of his state, especially in the line of transportation."

In 1888 he was not renominated by his party and returned to his business pursuits. Sabin charged that bribery had impacted the vote, but these charges were never verified.

== Personal life ==
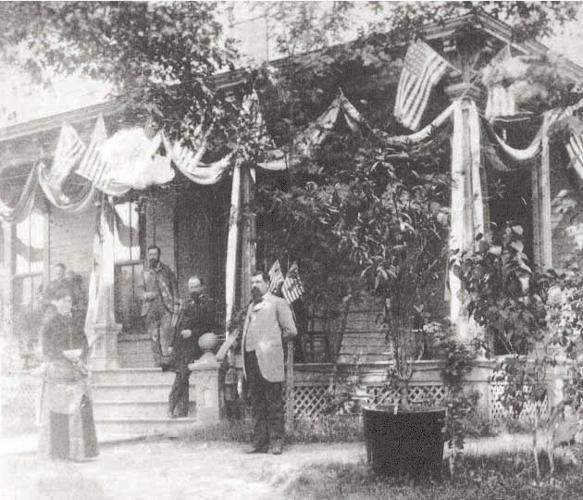

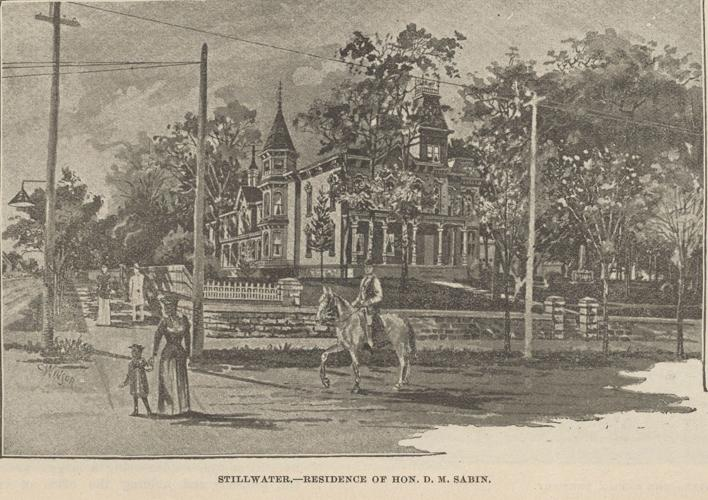
Senator Dwight M Sabin Stillwater Residence, circa 1880

Sabin married twice, first, to Ellen Amelia Hutchins and second, on July 1, 1891, to Jessie Larmon, daughter of Asabel and Susan Slee of Paducah, Kentucky.

E. Amelia Hutchens (b. May 1, 1844) was the adoptive daughter of a doctor from Danielson, Connecticut, who married Dwight sometime between his return from his wartime service in D.C. and his departure for Minnesota. For their family, Dwight and Ellen adopted, first, the sisters Blanche and Ethel (children of John B. Raymond of Fargo, a former congressional delegate for the Dakotas.). Later they added a third child to their family, Ada Chambers, the young daughter of a Sabin relative.

"All Stillwater believed them to be a happy pair." In the early 1870s Sabin constructed a palatial home at the northeast corner of Laurel & Third streets in Stillwater. This was the first private residence in Stillwater to boast electric lights—Sabin had installed cables that ran from the Prison's powerhouse to his home. Wired throughout, visitors would "gaze on the wonderful Aladdin Cave lights and soon it was the talk of the country about the marvelous light that was to be seen both day and night at the stately Sabin home." This socially adept couple seemed to make a smooth transition to Washington life following Sabin's election as US Senator. Together they were active participants in the social scene, the grand dinners, the gala birthday parties, the delegations to formal occasions such as Grant's funeral. "Socially, Mrs. Sabin is a most fascinating lady", the New York Times reported, "in Washington she gave weekly receptions which were among the most popular given by any lady in that city, and were attended by the most distinguished people."

When Dwight entered a petition for divorce on the grounds of misuse of alcohol and morphine, the news made the front page of the New York Times. Mrs. Sabin had been hospitalized in "an asylum for inebriates" in Flushing, New York. The proceedings, which followed directly on Sabin's loss of his Senate seat, had been kept quiet until the last days of his office. The Times, which had in past coverage described Sabin's political talents as mediocre, and been unstinting in their reports on his financial machinations, approached this sad domestic story from a widely sympathetic standpoint. This stood in high contrast other reports of the period, which painted a rather more dramatic picture of Mrs. Sabin, villainously committed against her will, "Senator Sabin has acted generously by her in his provisions for her present and future comfort." Neither Mrs. Sabin, or her friends and family, would oppose the suit. Sabin's conduct in the matter, "has been all that could be expected under the melancholy circumstances of the case."

Jessie Swann was the widow of W. G. Swann of St. Paul. She was with Sabin in Chicago at the time of his death, "unexpected heart failure", on December 22, 1902, at the Auditorium Annex. They had been living in Duluth for two years at that time, near the home of daughter Ethel, now married to T.C. Phillips. The over-magnificent Sabin mansion was left empty after Mrs. Sabin returned to Duluth, and ultimately pulled down in 1918 for its timber.

He is the namesake of the city of Sabin, Minnesota.

== Notes ==
U.S. Senate
Preceded by William Windom	U.S. Senator (Class 3) from Minnesota; 1883–1889; Served alongside: Samuel J. R. McMillan, Cushman K. Davis	Succeeded by William D. Washburn
Preceded by Philetus Sawyer	Chair of the Senate Railroads Committee; 1887–1889	Succeeded by John H. Mitchell
Party political offices
Preceded by Marshall Jewell	Chair of the Republican National Committee; 1883–1884	Succeeded by Benjamin Jones
