= VUL =

VUL may refer to:

- Vancouver Ultimate League
- Variable universal life insurance
- Vilnius University Library
- Virginia University of Lynchburg
- Vulpecula, a constellation
- PSS silent pistol, or "Vul"
