= Will Stancil =

American lawyer and political commentator

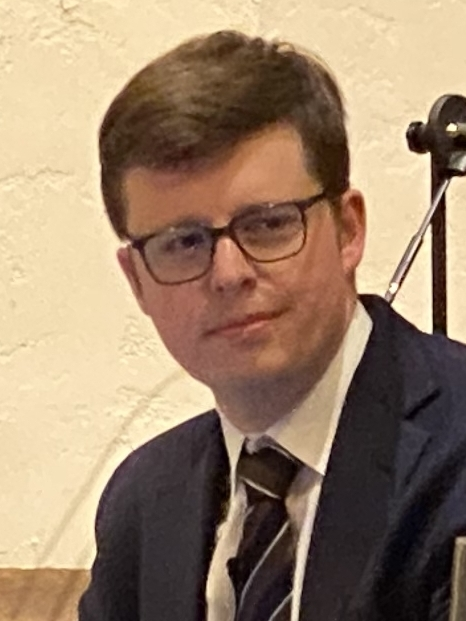
- Stancil in 2024
- Born: William Stancil; July 16, 1985 (age 41); Belmont, North Carolina, U.S.
- Education: Wake Forest University (BA); Queen's University Belfast (MA); University of Minnesota (MPP, JD)
- Political party: Democratic (DFL)

X information
- Handle: @whstancil
- Years active: 2009–2025 (Note: Since mid-December 2025, Stancil has not posted to Twitter.)
- Followers: 112.2 thousand

Bluesky information
- Handle: @whstancil.bsky.social
- Years active: 2023–present
- Followers: 103.3 thousand
- Last updated: April 28, 2026

William Stancil (born July 16, 1985) is an American lawyer, activist, and researcher on housing policy. A Democrat and a liberal, Stancil is known for his presence on Twitter and Bluesky, where he has defended the economic policy of the Biden administration, criticized Operation Metro Surge, and been frequently harassed by right wing accounts.

In 2024, Stancil ran to represent District 61A in the Minnesota House of Representatives. During the race, far-right accounts claiming to be Stancil supporters harassed his opponents, who obliquely criticized his use of social media. Stancil was defeated in the district's Democratic primary, earning 36.43% of votes cast.

== Early life and education ==
Stancil was born on July 16, 1985, to a local lawyer and an English teacher in Belmont, North Carolina. He received a bachelor's degree in history from Wake Forest University in 2007 and a master's degree in Reconstruction-era Black history from Queen's University Belfast in 2008. Stancil moved to Minnesota in 2009 and received a juris doctor and master's degree in public policy from the University of Minnesota in 2013. As of 2024, he was a research fellow at the University of Minnesota's Institute of Metropolitan Opportunity, with a focus on civil rights and education and housing policy, working for Myron Orfield, who later endorsed his House campaign. From 2018 to 2021, Stancil wrote articles for The Atlantic.

== Social media ==
Stancil has been described as one of the "most well-known online pugilists in American politics" by the editor-in-chief of the Minnesota Reformer and the Minneapolis–Saint Paul region's "most prolific public intellectual on social media" by Mpls St.Paul Magazine.

Stancil joined Twitter in 2009, around the time he moved to Minnesota. He stated that he was not particularly active on Twitter until the first presidency of Donald Trump. Stancil's Twitter account saw a boost in popularity starting in May 2023, when he began posting in favor of the idea of the economic policy of the Biden administration causing economic growth instead of a recession. This saw positive reception among centrists and negative reception among leftists, the latter group believing that Stancil was a shill for the Democratic Party.

=== Harassment ===
Stancil has been called the "most harassed guy on X" by Slate. During his run for the Minnesota House of Representatives, far-right accounts further escalated the harassment to his opponents, claiming they were supporters of Stancil. Such users also prompted Grok to tweet graphic fantasies of raping Stancil. In October 2025, provocateur-cartoonist and self-described Nazi Emily Youcis began posting The Will Stancil Show on X, an AI-assisted cartoon satirizing Stancil and his politics. The far-right author Charles Cornish-Dale, writing for The Spectator, described the series as "better than anything Comedy Central or Adult Swim has produced in the last 20 years". The Atlantic described it as the "racist, AI-generated future of entertainment".

== 2024 Minnesota House of Representatives campaign ==
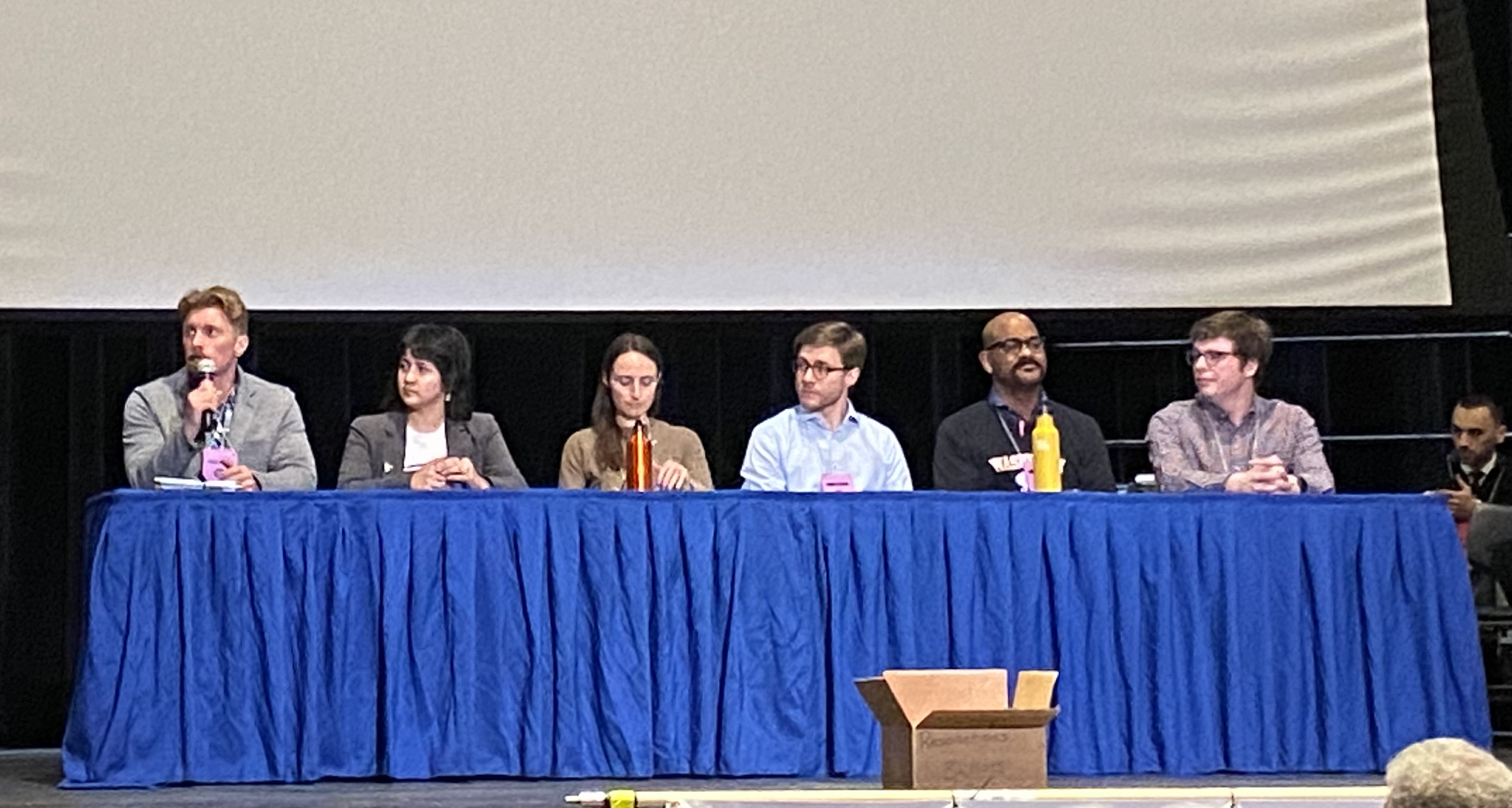
Candidates for endorsement at the SD61 DFL convention, left to right: Trevor Turner, Isabel Rolfes, Katie Jones, Dylan McMahon, Jared Brewington, and Will Stancil

In 2024, Stancil ran for the Minnesota House of Representatives in District 61A as part of the Minnesota Democratic–Farmer–Labor Party. Stancil ran on a platform of increasing government accountability, revitalizing Minneapolis economically, better public education, enhancing public safety, restoring the tax base, and protecting civil rights.

Far-right accounts claiming to be Stancil supporters harassed his opponents, resulting in his opponents increasing security at public events and limiting their use of Twitter. Stancil received veiled criticism from his fellow candidates Katie Jones and Isabel Rolfes for his social media activity, both online and in person. The candidates in the primary agreed that most voters in their district were not aware of Stancil's online presence. Opposition to Stancil mailed various social media posts Stancil had made to voters. Stancil claimed the bulk of online harassment would eventually subside after some weeks.

Stancil's endorsements included Carpenters Local 322 and Lisa Goodman, a former Minneapolis City Councilwoman. His social media presence allowed him to receive $92,000 in campaign funding by August 2024. An independent expenditure committee called United 61A Neighbors, with initial funding of $3,000 from Unidos We Win PAC, was formed with the apparent purpose of causing Stancil to lose the primary.

Stancil lost the primary to Katie Jones, who proceeded to win the seat in the general election.

== Political positions ==
Stancil's politics are considered center-left or liberal and he has received substantial criticism of his positions from both the left and right. Stancil has been described as being a "die-hard liberal Democrat" since 2003.

Initially holding Republican beliefs in high school, Stancil marched against the Iraq War in 2002, describing it in an interview as "radicalizing" him. Stancil ran a field office in Belmont for Barack Obama in 2008. In 2020, he supported Elizabeth Warren's presidential campaign, and still cites Warren as a good indicator of his basic political outlook.

Stancil stated in 2024 that he was "scared to death" of Donald Trump during his first presidency from 2016 to 2020, expressing his wishes that Trump would not be reelected that year. In 2023 and 2024, Stancil argued that the economy under the presidency of Joe Biden was successful despite high inflation, claimed that those who argued otherwise were dishonest, and that the negative polarization against Biden was largely as a result of social media.

Stancil believes that voters' perception of the world colored through social media is significantly more important than their material wellbeing, and that psychology was the primary reason Kamala Harris lost the 2024 election and Trumpism is successful.

During Operation Metro Surge, Stancil repeatedly tailed United States Immigration and Customs Enforcement agents, and expressed support for the abolition of ICE. Stancil later claimed that his willingness to take reporters on ridealongs resulted in his removal from Signal chat networks in his neighborhood that coordinate direct opposition to ICE agents.

== Electoral history ==
DFL primary results by precinct: Jones: 30–40%; 40–50%; 50–60%; Stancil: 60–70%

2024 Minnesota House of Representatives election, District 61A DFL primary
Party	Candidate	Votes	%
Democratic (DFL)	Katie Jones	3,956	43.15
Democratic (DFL)	Will Stancil	3,340	36.43
Democratic (DFL)	Isabel Rolfes	1,872	20.42
Total votes		9,168	100.0
