= Canadian Ultimate Championships =

Annual Ultimate Frisbee tournament

Canadian Ultimate Championships (CUC) is an annual Ultimate Frisbee tournament organized by Ultimate Canada and the player association of the city where the championships are held. Until 2016, all divisions were hosted in the same location. Beginning in 2016 the mixed divisions have been held as a separate event.

== History of ultimate and disc sports in Canada ==
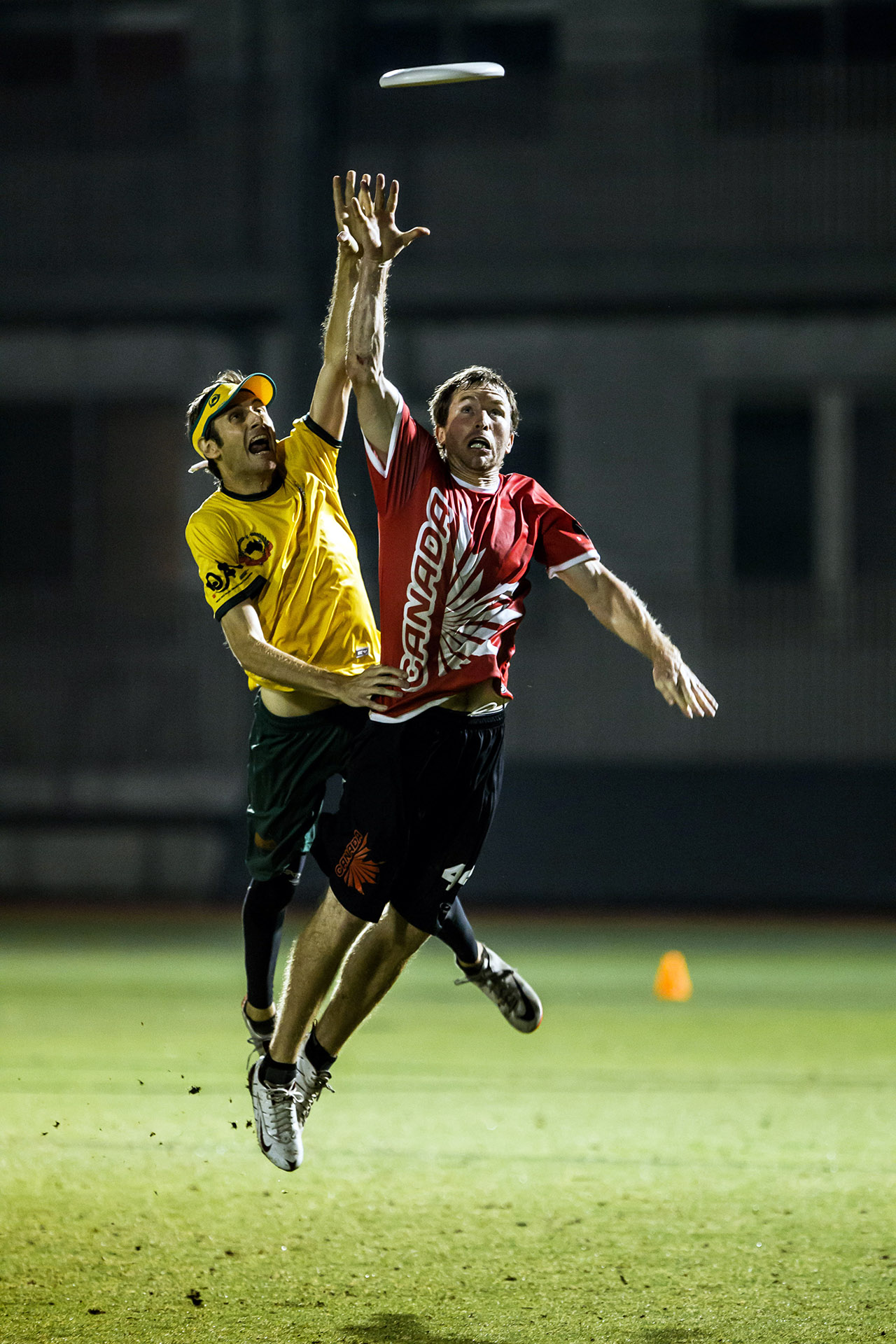
Australia vs Canada Ultimate players at WUGC 2012 in Japan. Ultimate Canada

Organized disc sports began in the early 1970s, with promotional efforts from Irwin Toy, the Canadian Open Frisbee Championships, Toronto (1972–1985), the Vancouver Open Frisbee Championships (1974–1977) and professionals using Frisbee show tours to perform at universities, fairs, and sporting events. Disc sports such as freestyle, double disc court, guts, ultimate and disc golf became this sports first events. Two sports, the team sport of ultimate and disc golf are very popular worldwide and are now being played semi-professionally. The World Flying Disc Federation, Professional Disc Golf Association, Freestyle Players Association are the official rules and sanctioning organizations for flying disc sports worldwide. Ultimate Canada is the official rules and sanctioning organization for ultimate in Canada.

Ultimate is a team sport played with a flying disc. The object of the game is to score points by passing the disc to members of your own team, on a rectangular field, 120 yards (110m) by 40 yards (37m), until you have successfully completed a pass to a team member in the opposing team's end zone. In the early 1970s, Ken Westerfield and Jim Kenner (Discraft founder) introduced ultimate along with other disc sports North of the 49th parallel at the Canadian Open Frisbee Championships, Toronto (1972–1985) and the Vancouver Open Frisbee Championships (1974–1977). In 1979, Ken Westerfield and Chris Lowcock created the Toronto Ultimate Club (TUC). The Toronto Ultimate Club is one of the ultimate's oldest leagues.

The first Canadian Ultimate Championships (CUC) were held for the open division in Ottawa in 1987, produced by Marcus Brady and Brian Guthrie. OCUA subsequently hosted the 1993, 1999, 2002, 2011 and 2017 Canadian Ultimate Championships.

Canada has been ranked number one in the Ultimate World Rankings several times since 1998 in all the Ultimate Divisions (including Open and Women's) according to the World Flying Disc Federation.

In 2013, as a founding partner, the Toronto Ultimate Club presented Canada's first semi-professional ultimate team, the Toronto Rush to the American Ultimate Disc League (AUDL). In their first season they went undefeated 18–0 and won the AUDL championships. The American Ultimate Disc League and the now defunct Major League Ultimate (MLU) are the first semi-professional ultimate leagues.

== Past Championships ==
=== Locations ===
Year	Location	Tournament Director(s)	Ultimate Canada Competition Director
2024	CUC: UPI, Ottawa, ON CUC Masters: RIM Park, Waterloo, ON CUC Grandmasters: Saskatoon, SK		Andrew Portwine Ben Klar
2023	CUC: Newton Athletic Park. Surrey, BC CUC Masters: Kelowna, BC	Surrey LOC with Troe Weston Kelowna LOC with Troe Weston	Andrew Portwine Andrew Batchelor
2022	CUC: Creditview Sandalwood Park. Brampton, ON CUC Masters: UPI. Ottawa, ON	Troe Weston	Andrew Portwine Andrew Batchelor
2021	UCI (Senior): UPI. Ottawa, ON UCI (Masters): UPI. Ottawa, ON Note: These are not considered CUCs	Teri-Lynne Belanger	Andrew Batchelor
2020	CUC: Creditview Sandalwood Park. Brampton, ON CUC Mixed: Laval, QC	Cancelled due to COVID-19	
2019	CUC: Ivor Dent Sports Field. Edmonton, AB CUC Mixed: Creditview Sandalwood Park. Brampton, ON	Edmonton LOC with Teri-Lynne Belanger Teri-Lynne Belanger	Andrew Batchelor Jen Stark & Andrew Batchelor
2018	CUC: Creditview Sandalwood Park. Brampton, ON CUC Mixed: Newton Athletic Park. Surrey, BC	Teri-Lynne Belanger Brian Gisel with Teri-Lynne Belanger	Andrew Batchelor
2017	CUC: UPI. Ottawa, ON CUC Mixed: Saskatoon, SK	Ottawa LOC: Venissa de Castro, Isabelle Blanchard, Naomi Garneau with Teri-Lynne Belanger Saskatoon LOC with Teri-Lynne Belanger	Kalen Carslaw Andrew Batchelor
2016	CUC: Ivor Dent Sports Field. Edmonton, AB CUC Mixed: Hamilton, ON	Edmonton LOC with Teri-Lynne Belanger Linda Kudo with Teri-Lynne Belanger	Kalen Carslaw Andrew Batchelor
2015	Winnipeg, MB	Winnipeg LOC with Teri-Lynne Belanger	Andrew Batchelor
2014	Waterloo, ON	Andrew Portwine with Teri-Lynne Belanger	Andrew Batchelor
2013	Vancouver, BC	Brian Gisel with Teri-Lynne Belanger	Teri-Lynne Belanger
2012	Victoria, BC	Kevin Burleigh	Andrew Batchelor
2011	Ottawa, ON	Cory Bowditch, Stuart Ginn and Ken Lange	Andrew Batchelor
2010	Sherbrooke, QC	Damien Roy	Blue McClellan
2009	Winnipeg, MB	Corey Draper	n/a
2008	Calgary, AB	Dave McLean	n/a
2007	Toronto, ON	Blue McClellan & Allison Fletcher	n/a
2006	Halifax, NS	Ed Fong	n/a
2005	Winnipeg, MB	Danny Sanders	n/a
2004	Vancouver, BC	Brian Gisel	n/a
2003	Saint-Jean-sur-Richelieu, QC	Louis Beauregard	n/a
2002	Ottawa, ON	Gwen Prillo & Mike Hall-Jones	n/a
2001	Edmonton, AB	Calvin Li	n/a
2000	Vancouver, BC	Brian Gisel	n/a
1999	Ottawa, ON	Jack Webb & Mike Hall-Jones	n/a
1998	Saint-Jean-sur-Richelieu, QC		n/a
1997	Victoria, BC		n/a
1996	Toronto, ON		n/a
1995	Calgary, AB	Grant Burns	n/a
1994	Winnipeg, MB	Dean Wright	n/a
1993	Ottawa, ON	Maren Hansen and Keith Whyte	n/a
1992	Vancouver, BC	Mike Kaweski	n/a
1991	Montreal, QC		n/a
1990	Calgary, AB	Grant Burns & Rick Collins	n/a
1989	Vancouver, BC	Adam Berson, Liam Robinson, Douglas Grant	n/a
1988	Toronto, ON	Chris & Les Lowcock	n/a
1987	Ottawa, ON (inaugural championship)	Marcus Brady & Brian Guthrie	n/a

=== Open ===
Year	Champion	Finalist	Third place	SOTG	MVP
2024	Phoenix (Ottawa)	Mephisto (Montreal)	Red Circus (Halifax)	RUT (Regina)	Owen Daigeler
2023	GOAT (Toronto)	General Strike (Winnipeg)	Furious George (Vancouver)	RUT (Regina)	James Lewis
2022	General Strike (Winnipeg)	AFC Rumble (Edmonton)	Houndd (Durham)	ONI (Vancouver)	Devin Cohen
2021	Furious George (Vancouver)	Mephisto (Montreal)	GOAT (Toronto)	Regiment (Newfoundland)	
2019	Furious George (Vancouver)	GOAT (Toronto)	General Strike (Winnipeg)	Berta Flatball Club (Edmonton)	Ty Barbieri
2018	Phoenix (Ottawa)	Alberta Flatball Club (Edmonton)	Grand Trunk (Toronto)	Houndd (Durham)	Russ Nicolls
2017	GOAT (Toronto)	General Strike (Winnipeg)	Phoenix (Ottawa)	GOAT (Toronto)	Jason Huynh
2016	Grand Trunk (Toronto)	General Strike (Winnipeg)	Mio Grape (Vancouver)	Maverick (Waterloo)	Connor Armstrong
2015	GOAT (Toronto)	Furious George (Vancouver)	Mockingbird (Montreal)	Alberta Flatball Club (Edmonton)	Derek Alexander
2014	Shepdog (Toronto)	Blackfish (Vancouver)	Demon (Montreal)	Red Circus (Halifax)	Isaiah Masek-Kelly
2013	Furious George (Vancouver)	Phoenix (Ottawa)	Mephisto (Montreal)	Mephisto (Montreal)	Peter Yu
2012	Furious George (Vancouver)	General Strike (Winnipeg)	The Ghosts (Calgary)	Nelson Homegrown (BC)	Kevin Underhill
2011	Furious George (Vancouver)	GOAT (Ottawa / Toronto)	Phoenix (Ottawa)	Maverick (Waterloo)	Morgan Hibbert
2010	Moondoggies (Toronto)	Mephisto (Montreal)	Phoenix (Ottawa)	NLA (NFLD) / Roy (Toronto)	John Hassell
2009	Mephisto (Montreal)	Phoenix (Ottawa)	Invictus (Calgary)	Tommy Douglas Dream Team (SK)	Jean-Levy Champagne
2008	Nomads (Victoria)	Mephisto (Montreal)	Invictus (Calgary)	General Strike (Wpg) / EMU (Edm)	Oscar Pottinger
2007	Furious George (Vancouver)	GOAT (Ottawa / Toronto)	Invictus (Calgary)	Too Bad (Toronto)	
2006	GOAT (Ottawa / Toronto)	Mephisto (Montreal)	Grand Trunk (Toronto)	Swass (Fredericton)	Andrew Ouchterlony
2005	Nomads (Victoria)	GOAT (Ottawa / Toronto)	Phoenix (Ottawa)	Too Bad (Toronto)	Anthony Maley
2004	Nomads (Victoria)	Calgary D&D (Calgary)	—	Grand Trunk (Toronto)	Joey Houssian
2003	Furious George (Vancouver)	GOAT (Ottawa / Toronto)	RWBB (Calgary)	Jerk Factory (Atlantic)	Jeff Cruickshank
2002	GOAT (Ottawa / Toronto)	Mephisto (Montreal)	Phoenix (Ottawa)	FOG (Halifax) / Mangina (Regina)	Pete Knowles
2001	Nomads (Victoria)	Invictus (Calgary)	Frisbots (Vancouver)	Incognito (Edmonton)	Evan Wood
2000	Furious George (Vancouver)	Invictus (Calgary)	waX (Ottawa)	Incognito (Edmonton)	John Wooldrige
1999	Furious George (Vancouver)	waX (Ottawa)	YES (Toronto)	Eddies (Vancouver)	Andrew Lugsdin
1998	waX (Ottawa)	Nomads (Victoria)	—	Chaos (Winnipeg)	Chris Sullivan
1997	Furious George (Vancouver)	Alter Boyz (Vancouver)	Cynics (Calgary)	Sausage Party (Saskatoon)	Adam Berson
1996	Furious George (Vancouver)	—	—	Da Cod Fodders (Halifax)	Evan Wood
1995	Furious George (Vancouver)	waX (Ottawa)	Toronto		Allan Nichols
1994	waX (Ottawa)	Vertigogh (Vancouver)	Cynics (Calgary)	Mufferaw Joe (Ottawa)	Phillip Roger
1993	waX (Ottawa)	Vertigogh (Vancouver)	Taxidermy (Toronto)		Phillip Roger
1992	Vertigogh (Vancouver)	PP Wax (Ottawa)	Cynics (Calgary)		Steve Oldenberg
1991	Vertigogh (Vancouver)	—	—		Michael Kader
1990	Cynics (Calgary)	Van Gogh (Vancouver)	—	Prairie Fire (Winnipeg)	Steev Limin
1989	Van Gogh (Vancouver)	Cynics (Calgary)	Secret Police (Ottawa)		Adam Berson
1988	Cynics (Calgary)	Darkside (Toronto)	—	Cynics (Calgary)	Steev Limin
1987	Darkside (Toronto)	Cynics (Calgary)	Montreal A (Montreal)		Rick Collins

=== Women ===
Year	Champion	Finalist	Third place	SOTG	MVP
2024	Stella (Ottawa)	Salty (Halifax)	StellO (Ottawa)	Stella (Ottawa)	Lauren Ballantyne
2023	6ixers (Toronto)	Traffic (Vancouver)	Iris (Quebec)	Tie: Momentum (Montreal), Valkyrie (Montreal), Oz (Ottawa)	
2022	Iris (Quebec)	QUB (Quebec City)	Stella (Ottawa)	Volt (Montreal)	Florence Dionne
2021	6ixers (Toronto)	Traffic (Vancouver)	Fusion (Winnipeg)	Iris (Quebec)	
2019	6ixers (Toronto)	Iris (Quebec)	Traffic (Vancouver)	Fusion (Winnipeg)	Brittney Dos Santos
2018	Iris (Quebec)	Stella (Ottawa)	PPF (Waterloo)	Korra (Regina)	Shaunaugh Howard
2017	6ixers (Toronto)	Traffic (Vancouver)	Iris (Quebec)	Wendigo (Vancouver)	Anouchka Beaudry
2016	Fusion (Winnipeg)	Sneaky House Hippos (Vancouver)	Flurry (Edmonton)	Fusion (Winnipeg)	Alexa Kovacs
2015	Traffic (Vancouver)	Iris (Montreal)	Capitals (Toronto / Ottawa)	Lily (Toronto)	Terri Whitehead
2014	PPF (Waterloo)	Stella (Ottawa)	Wild Rose (AB)	Zephyr (Vancouver)	Melissa Dunbar
2013	Traffic (Vancouver)	QUB (QC)	Fusion (Winnipeg)	Brizo (BC)	Ashlee Davison
2012	Traffic (Vancouver)	QUB (QC)	Stella (Ottawa)	Mystik (QC)	Kira Frew
2011	Capitals (Ottawa / Toronto)	Traffic (Vancouver)	QUB (QC)	Vintage (Montreal)	Alyson Walker
2010	Storm (Montreal)	Stella (Ottawa)	Lotus (Toronto)	Storm (Montreal)	Genevieve Dufresne
2009	Lotus (Toronto)	Stella (Ottawa)	Zephyr (Vancouver)	Salty (Halifax)	Kaitlyn Lovatt
2008	Stella (Ottawa)	Storm (Montreal)	FLO (Calgary)	Foxy (Edmonton)	Kate Crump
2007	Traffic (Vancouver)	Capitals (Ottawa / Toronto)	Team Alberta (AB)	Feisty (Toronto)	Sanya Pleshakov
2006	Lotus (Toronto)	Stella (Ottawa)	Flo (Calgary)	Storm (Montreal)	Alyson Walker
2005	Stella (Ottawa)	Lotus (Toronto)	Roughriders (Vancouver)	Fusion (Winnipeg)	Kathleen Lemieux
2004	Lotus (Toronto)	Ya Ya's (Edmonton)	Stella (Ottawa)	Bushfire (Vernon, BC)	Heather Killian
2003	Prime (Vancouver)	Stella (Ottawa)	Dame Edna (Ottawa)	Sirens (Regina)	Val Dion
2002	Fuse (Ottawa)	Urge (Toronto)	Dame Edna (Ottawa)	Crave (Winnipeg)	Erin Huck
2001	Flo (Calgary)	Urge (Toronto)	Stella (Ottawa)	Ya Ya's (Edmonton)	Melanie Labine
2000	Prime (Vancouver)	Flo (Calgary)	Urge (Toronto)	Flo (Calgary)	Teresa Fong
1999	Prime (Vancouver)	Stella (Ottawa)	Gameface (Toronto)	Flo (Calgary)	Su Ning Strube
1998	Stella (Ottawa)	Guests of Oprah (Goo) (Vancouver)		Venus Fly Trap (Montreal)	Nikki Brackstone
1997	Guests of Oprah (Goo) (Vancouver)	Gameface (Toronto)		Big Talk, No Practice (Vancouver)	Jules Shalman
1996	Guests of Oprah (Goo) (Vancouver)	Bitchin' Sweet Peas (Victoria)		Huckin Harlots (Vancouver)	Leslie Calder
1995	Guests of Oprah (Goo) (Vancouver)	Layout Sisters (Toronto)			Leslie Calder
1994	Guests of Oprah (Goo) (Vancouver)	Horizont'elle (Ottawa)	Flo (Calgary)		Liz Case
1993	Horizont'elle (Ottawa)	Guests of Oprah (Goo) (Vancouver)	Psychocybernetics (North Bay)		Justine Price
1992	See Jane Run (Toronto)	Flo (Calgary)	Spin Sisters (Vancouver)		Giliian Scarfe
1991	See Jane Run (Toronto)				Giliian Scarfe
1990	See Jane Run (Toronto)	Lipstick Girls (Montreal)			
1989	See Jane Run (Toronto)	Lipstick Girls (Montreal)	Flo (Calgary)		

=== Mixed ===
Year	Champion	Finalist	Third place	SOTG	MVP
2024	tobe! (Toronto)	Harfang (St Jean sur Richelieu)	Royals (Richmond)	Schweek (Montreal)	Keith McCrae
2023	Red Flag (Vancouver)	Union (Toronto)	Pretty Boys & Handsome Girls (Winnipeg)	Jam (Saskatoon)	
2022	Union (Toronto)	Pretty Boys & Handsome Girls (Winnipeg)	Danger Noodle (Toronto) & T.T. (Vancouver) (game not played due to lightning)	Harfang (St-Jean-sur-Richelieu)	Jordan Ing-Chen
2021	Red Flag (Vancouver)	Pretty Boys & Handsome Girls (Winnipeg)	Union (Toronto)	Zen (Toronto)	Zellema Mot
2019	Lab (Quebec)	Soup (Ontario)	Battleship (Saint-Jean-sur-Richelieu)	Quakers (Quebec) Fable (Vancouver)	Miguel Goderre
2018	Pretty Boys & Handsome Girls (Winnipeg)	Goomba Gang (Vancouver)	Beer Kitty (Vancouver)	Thunder (Waterloo)	Jamal El-Fatih
2017	Anchor (Halifax)	Crash (Kitchener-Waterloo)	Battleship (Montreal)	Union (Toronto)	Jennie Korus
2016	Montreal Old Star (Montreal)	Nagano 98 (Aurora)	Local 613 (Kingston)	Local 613 (Kingston)	Antoine Lepagnol
2015	Team Fisher Price (Vancouver)	Union (Toronto)	Bunny Thugs (Saskatoon)	Force (Barrie)	Cole Keffer
2014	Crash (Waterloo)	Max Power (Toronto)	Local 613 (Kingston)	Rogue Hippo (Edmonton)	Heather Neary
2013	Union (Toronto)	Stache (Vancouver)	Team Fisher Price (Vancouver)	Bytown Flatball Club (BFC) (Ottawa)	Hadiya Roderique
2012	Odyssée (Montreal)	Union (Toronto)	UNight (Montreal)	Skysharks (Victoria)	Ray Nemours
2011	Team Fisher Price (Vancouver)	Odyssée (Montreal)	Onyx (QC)	Odyssée (Montreal)	Jeremy Norden
2010	Onyx (QC)	RIP (Montreal)	Spawn (Fredericton)	Swarm (Winnipeg)	Mathieu Bordeleau
2009	Chaos (Winnipeg)	Onyx (QC)	RIP (Montreal)	Pandemic (Vancouver)	Christy Mader
2008	Team Fisher Price (Vancouver)	Onyx (Quebec City)	Psychoplastic (Edmonton)	Wannabago (Montreal)	Kevin Cheung
2007	Team Fisher Price (Vancouver)	Bytown Flatball Club (BFC) (Ottawa)	Gecko (Sherbrooke)	Wannabago (Montreal)	
2006	Camelot (Montreal)	Chaos (Winnipeg)	Bombing Madd Fatties (Toronto)	Here to Pickup (Toronto)	Lorne Beckman
2005	Team Fisher Price (Vancouver)	Joyride (Vancouver)	Camelot (Montreal)	Hail (Edmonton)	Kevin Cheung
2004	Team Fisher Price (Vancouver)	Bombing Madd Fatties (Toronto)	Bodhi (Toronto)	Krank (Halifax)	Brendan Wong
2003	Chaos (Winnipeg)	Lucky (Victoria)	Bonesaw (Vancouver)	Sugar (Halifax)	Nina Bansal
2002	Lucky (Victoria)	Mon Ami Burundi (Toronto)	Grin (Montreal)	Stakatak (Sherbrooke)	Tassy Davidson
2001	Idle Hands (Vancouver)	Chaos (Winnipeg)	Sumo (Montreal)	Nine Inch Ales (Toronto)	Sara Falkner
2000	Ro-Sham-Bo (Vancouver)	Chaos (Winnipeg)	Idle Hands (Vancouver)	Undecided (Vancouver)	Chris Lowe
1999	Chaos (Winnipeg)	Thrive (Toronto)	Fabulous Flying Flamingos (Ottawa)	Chaos (Winnipeg)	

=== Junior Open ===
Year	Champion	Finalist	Third place	SOTG	MVP
2026	Ignite (Ottawa)	Dyno (Vancouver)	Team Manitoba (Winnipeg)	Cannons (Calgary)	Chase Alexander
2025	Origine (Quebec)	Dyno (Vancouver)	Canyon (North Vancouver)	New Scotland Blues (Halifax)	
2024	Dyno (Vancouver)	Ignite (Ottawa)	Canyon (North Vancouver)	Argon (Montreal)	
2023	Dyno (Vancouver)	Team Manitoba (Winnipeg)	Ignite (Ottawa)	Blaze (Ottawa)	Miles Wong
2022	MOFO (Winnipeg)	Eclipse (Vancouver)	Origine (Québec city)	Mischief (Vancouver)	Ethan Nemetchek
2019	Eclipse (Vancouver)	Ignite (Ottawa)	TORO (Toronto)	Titane (Montreal)	Neo Debroux
2018	TORO (Toronto)	Eclipse (Vancouver)	Vortex (Fraser Valley)	TORO (Toronto)	
2017	MOFO (Winnipeg)	TORO (Toronto)	Ignite (Ottawa)	Wheaties (Saskatchewan)	
2016	MOFO (Winnipeg)	TORO (Toronto)	Bonfire (North Vancouver)	TORO (Toronto)	
2015	TORO (Toronto)	Alpha (BC)	MOFO (Winnipeg)	Bonfire (North Vancouver)	
2014	TORO (Toronto)	MOFO (Winnipeg)	Bonfire (North Vancouver)	Révolution (Quebec)	
2013	Wildcard (Vancouver)	MOFO (Winnipeg)	Capital Punishment (Ottawa)	Hydro (Quebec)	
2012	MOFO (Winnipeg)	Hydro (Quebec)	BC Blaze (British Columbia)		

=== Junior Girls ===
Year	Champion	Finalist	Third place	SOTG	MVP
2025	Origine (Quebec)	Titane (Montreal)	Team Manitoba (Winnipeg)	Cimes (Saint-Hyacinthe)	
2024	Dyno (Vancouver)	Origine (Quebec)	Canyon (North Vancouver)	West (Ottawa)	
2023	Dyno (Vancouver)	Wicked West (Ottawa)	Vortex (Fraser Valley)	Wheaties (Regina)	
2022	Eclipse (Vancouver)	Vortex (Fraser Valley)	Wicked West (Ottawa)	Titane (Montreal)	Jenalyn Ng
2019	TORO (Toronto)	MOFO (Winnipeg)	Vortex (Fraser Valley)	Cannons (Calgary)	
2018	MOFO (Winnipeg)	Eclipse (Vancouver)	TORO (Toronto)	TORO (Toronto)	
2017	Misfit (Vancouver)	TORO (Toronto)	Vortex (Fraser Valley)	Aera (QC)	
2016	Misfit (Vancouver)	Alpha (BC)	TORO (Toronto)	Fallout (Edmonton)	
2015	Alpha (BC)	Vortex (Fraser Valley)	MOFO (Winnipeg)	NL Juniors (NL)	
2014	TORO (Toronto)	West Coast Tribe (BC)	MOFO (Winnipeg)	Team Quebec (QC)	
2013	Wildcard (BC)	Vortex (Fraser Valley)	Overdrive (Toronto)	Aera (QC)	
2012	BC Blaze (BC)	Overdrive (Toronto)	MOFO (Winnipeg)		

=== Junior Mixed ===
Year	Champion	Finalist	Third place	SOTG
2011	Shock (Vancouver)	Overdrive (Toronto)	Vortex (Surrey)	bEAST (Halifax)
2010	West Coast Reign (Vancouver)	Overdrive (Toronto)	Vortex (Surrey)	
2009	Blackout (Vancouver)	Vortex (Surrey)	MOFO (Winnipeg)	DOAP (Winnipeg)
2008	MOFO (Winnipeg)	Crossfire (Vancouver)	Dirt (Toronto)	QC (QC) / CUJO (Calgary)
2007	Backbone (Vancouver)	Dirt (Toronto)	OJ (Ottawa)	
2006	Pyro (Vancouver)	MOFO (Winnipeg)	Vortex (Vancouver)	Hustle n' Flow (Sackville)
2005	West Coast Blitz (Vancouver)	MOFO (Winnipeg)	OJ (Ottawa)	
2004	MOFO (Winnipeg)	Deep Threat (Vancouver)	OJ (Ottawa)	MOFO (Winnipeg)
2003	MOFO (Winnipeg)	Hazmats (Montreal)	G-Men (Calgary)	The 613 (Ottawa)
2002	MOFO (Winnipeg)	Schadenfreude (Vancouver)	G-Men (Calgary)	Dirt (Toronto)
2001	DFA (Vancouver)	MOFO (Winnipeg)	Calgary Juniors (Calgary)	MOFO (Winnipeg)
2000	DFA (Vancouver)	MOFO (Winnipeg)	Blue Milk (BC)	
1999	Tetris626 (North Bay / Ottawa)	Seamless (Vancouver)	MOFO (Winnipeg)	
1998	626 (North Bay)	MOFO (Winnipeg)	Tetris (Ottawa)	
1997	Invisible Hand (Calgary)			
1996	Prime Sinisters (Ottawa)			
1995				
1994	Eagles (Winnipeg)			

=== Masters Open ===
Year	Champion	Finalist	Third place	SOTG	MVP
2023	Richard & Associates (Vancouver)	Dead Circus (Halifax)	Carbon (Edmonton)	Carbon (Edmonton)	Joel Bellavance
2022	Still (ON)	Quack (QC)	NSOM (QC)	Grandsome (QC)	John Hallet
2019	Still (ON)	Queen City Kings (Regina)	Carbon (Edmonton)	Viper (Waterloo)	Brian O'Callaghan
2018	Max Power (Toronto)	Borderline (Halifax)	Queen City Kings (Regina)	Viper (Waterloo)	Aaron Hooper
2017	NSOM (Montreal)	Torque (Winnipeg)	Best Before (Toronto)	Viper (Waterloo)	
2016	NSOM (Montreal)	Grizzle (Central BC)	Carbon (Edmonton)	Carbon (Edmonton)	Ray Nemours
2015	Shepherds (Toronto)	Muriqui (Vancouver)	NSOM (Montreal)	NSOM (Montreal)	John Hassell
2014	Borderline (Atlantic)	The Forgotten (Toronto)	NSOM (Montreal)	NSOM (Montreal)	Sean Patrick Malone
2013	FIGJAM (Calgary)	NSOM (Montreal)	Flood (Winnipeg)	NSOM (Montreal)	David Burdziuk
2012	Nomads (Victoria)	FIGJAM (Calgary)	NSOM (Montreal)	Gauntlet (Vancouver)	Pete Atkinson
2011	Nomads (Victoria)	Glum (Ottawa)	FIGJAM (Calgary)	Flood (Winnipeg)	Al Nichols
2010	Glum (Ottawa)	FIGJAM (Calgary)	Fuel (Toronto)	Glum (Ottawa) / Scotch (Halifax)	Seton Stiebert
2009	Glum (Ottawa)	FIGJAM (Calgary)	Grind (Vancouver)	EPIC (AB)	Chee Chan
2008	Glum (Ottawa)	FIGJAM (Calgary)	Fossil (Toronto)	Sabotage (Vancouver) / Scotch (Halifax) / Epic (AB)	Blayne Ferguson
2007	Tombstone (Toronto)	Glum (Ottawa)	Retro (Vancouver)	Glum (Ottawa)	John McArton
2006	Bad Daddy Ultimate (Ottawa)	Smell My Mule (Ottawa)	Relic (Calgary)	Scotch (Halifax)	Ken Lange
2005	Grind (Vancouver)	Flood (Winnipeg)	Cynics (Calgary)	ECU (Halifax)	Brian Harris
2004	Cynics (Calgary)	Eddies (Vancouver)	Grind (Vancouver)	Red Flood (Winnipeg)	Grant Burns
2003	Wuz (Ottawa)	Grind (Vancouver)	Smell My Mule (Ottawa)	Never (Ottawa)	Jamie Kelly
2002	Wuz My Mule (Ottawa)	NADS (North Bay)	Negli-gents (Vancouver)	Aged to Perfection (ATP) (Toronto)	John Findlay
2001	Relics (Calgary)	Farm Accidents (Vancouver)	Prairie Fire (Winnipeg)	Smell My Mule (Ottawa)	Paul Lepper
2000	Farm Accidents (Vancouver)	Relics (Calgary)	Quality Control	Esoterics (Lasquiti)	Trevor Stokes
1999	NADS (North Bay / Toronto)	Smell My Mule (Ottawa)	Relics (Ottawa)	Stinky Old Monkeys (Vancouver)	Rob Bourre
1998	Wuz (Ottawa)	Never (Ottawa)	Smell My Mule (Ottawa)	Stinky Old Monkeys (Vancouver)	Cliff Youdale
1997	Smell My Mule (Ottawa)	Relics (Calgary)		Relics (Calgary)	Russ MacDonald
1996	D.E.A.D. (Ottawa)	Aged to Perfection (Toronto)	Passing Wind (Ottawa)	Zoyds (Toronto)	Steve Ott

=== Masters Women ===
Year	Champion	Finalist	Third place	SOTG	MVP
2023	StellO (Ottawa*)	VANS (Vancouver)	Sage (Quebec)	Korra (Regina)	Jessie Brown
2022	StellO (Ottawa)	MaQramée (QC)	Agwata (Gatineau)	Agwata (Gatineau)	
2019	lowercase (ON)	'Berta (AB)	PNW Basic (Vancouver)	Throwback (Edmonton)	Courtney Benvenuti
2018	Forever 31 (Toronto)	Thrift Shop (Hamilton)	Mint (Winnipeg)	Nebula (Ottawa)	Kate Jardine
2017	Vintage (Montreal)	lowercase (ON)	DYNA (Calgary)	Annie Oakley	
2016	Throwback (Edmonton)	Eclipse (Ottawa)	DYNA (Calgary)	MASH (Calgary)	Jenn Nicholls
2015	Vintage (Montreal)	Terra (Toronto)	The Collective	Vintage (Montreal)	Julie Tremblay
2014	Terra (Toronto)	Eclipse (Ottawa)	Thrift Shop (Hamilton)	DYNA (Calgary)	Bonnie Lee
2013	Vintage (Montreal)	Terra (Toronto)	Contraband (Vancouver)	Vintage (Montreal)	Alison Fischer

=== Masters Mixed ===
Year	Champion	Finalist	Third place	SOTG	MVP
2023	Qold (Quebec)	Notorious KWG (Kitchener-Waterloo & Guelph)	Forever Young (Vancouver)	Firefly (Winnipeg)	Mathieu Bordeleau
2022	Forever Young (Vancouver) & POQ POQ(Quebec) (QOLD vs POQ called due to lightning)		Qold (Quebec) & Elder (Ottawa) (game not played due to lightning)	Pushing Daisies (Ottawa)	
2019	Qold (Quebec City)	Flux (Calgary)	Notorious KWG (Kitchener-Waterloo & Guelph)	Firefly (Winnipeg)	Marianne Pilon
2018	Happy Campers (Victoria)	Mastadon (Vancouver)	Tilde (Vancouver)	Firefly (Winnipeg)	Scott Craig
2017	Penguin Village (Saskatoon)	Mastadon (Vancouver)		Bingo & Chill	Marcus Storey
