= Stancil Johnson =

American psychiatrist and disc golfer (1933–2021)

Stancil E. D. Johnson (1933–2021) was a psychiatrist, a frisbee enthusiast and served as Frisbee's official historian.

He was a member of the International Frisbee Hall of Fame and the Disc Golf Hall of Fame.

In 1968 he played on Ed Headrick's Guts Frisbee team that won the 11th annual International Frisbee Tournament.

He is considered a pioneer in competitive disc golf and the history of the sport. In 1975, he wrote Frisbee: a Practitioner's Manual and Definitive Treatise. His 1975 book is considered the authority on early disc activities. At the time of his death he was working on a book about disc golf.

Between 2000–2007, he was the first instructor at California State University, Monterey Bay (CSUMB) to teach a disc golf class.

In 2006, the inaugural West Coast College Open at CSUMB was held, and the tournament trophy presented to the winning team was named, "The Stancil Johnson Cup."

In 2009, the two disc golf courses at CSUMB were renamed "The Stancil Courses at CSU Monterey Bay, featuring Cypress and Oaks" in honor of his contributions.

He is quoted as having said, "When a ball dreams, it dreams it's a frisbee."
