= Ottawa-Carleton Ultimate Association =

Ultimate frisbee association

- Formation: 1993
- Type: Ultimate Frisbee Association
- Location: Ottawa, Ontario, Canada
- Website: http://www.ocua.ca

The Ottawa-Carleton Ultimate Association (OCUA) is a registered not-for-profit corporation dedicated to the sport of disc Ultimate in Ottawa, Ontario, Canada. Ultimate in Ottawa began in 1984 as a result of individuals coming together to play Ultimate in scrimmage games. In the summer of 1985, local Ottawa players organized the first "No Borders" tournament, with visiting teams from North Bay, Toronto, and the United States. In 1986 formal league organization meetings took place to organize a league with basic principles and guidelines.

The first Ultimate League in Ottawa began play in May 1986 with 5 teams as OCULT (Ottawa City Ultimate League, Thing). The original 5 teams were the Screaming Yellow Zonkers (still playing in OCUA), Bruce and the Usuals, the Ultimate Revolution, Disc Guys, and Disc Drive. As a result of this new league, players from Ottawa helped organize a Canadian entry into the 1986 World Championships in Colchester, England, joining players from Toronto, Calgary, and Vancouver to form the Canadian team. The first Canadian Ultimate championships for Ultimate were held for the open division in Ottawa in 1987. OCUA subsequently hosted the 1993, 1999, 2002, 2011, 2017 and 2024 Canadian Ultimate Championships.

In 1993, the league which had increased its number of teams six-fold, officially incorporated as a not-for-profit and renamed as OCUA. Since 1993 OCUA has provided recreational Ultimate Frisbee leagues in Ottawa, reaching a peak of 354 teams registered for summer league play in 2004 .

As of 2012, OCUA offers a variety of indoor and outdoor leagues throughout the year and have over 260 teams playing in the recreational adult and youth summer leagues. The number of teams that play in OCUA summer leagues has made it one of the largest Ultimate leagues in the world; having between 250-350 registered teams every summer since 2000.

OCUA has the unique distinction of being the Ultimate Frisbee association with the largest privately owned field complex for Ultimate Frisbee in the world. Located in the south Ottawa community of Greely (1295 Manotick Station Road), UPI (Ultimate Parks Incorporated) was built in 1998, funded entirely by the membership of OCUA, and is owned by the Association. The 19 fields of UPI (17 of which are irrigated) are dedicated solely to Ultimate and were in large part constructed by the efforts of OCUA members.
