= Stancil, Missouri =

Extinct hamlet in Missouri, U.S.

Coordinates: 36°21′05″N 89°38′43″W

Stancil is an extinct town in Pemiscot County, in the U.S. state of Missouri. The GNIS classifies it as a populated place.

A post office called Stancil was established in 1890, and remained in operation until 1906. The community has the name of John P. Stancil, a state legislator.
