= Minnesota's 61A House of Representatives district =

American legislative district

Minnesota's 61A State House of Representatives district
Representative
Katie Jones; DFL–Minneapolis
- Demographics: 83.6% White; 4.4% Black; 4.8% Hispanic; 4.0% Asian; 0.6% Native American <0.1% Hawaiian/Pacific Islander; 2.4% Other; 5.0% Multiracial
- Population: 43,916

District 61A is a district of the Minnesota House of Representatives covering portions of the city of Minneapolis in the Twin Cities metropolitan area including portions of the Phillips, Ventura Village, Seward, and Lyn-Lake neighborhoods.

In the Senate, the same area comprises part of District 61.

== List of representatives ==
Member	Party	Residence	Term
Katie Jones	DFL	Minneapolis	2025–Present
Frank Hornstein	DFL	Minneapolis	2013–2025
Karen Clark	DFL	Minneapolis	1993–2013
Lee Greenfield	DFL	Minneapolis	1983–1992
John Brandl	DFL	Minneapolis	1981–1982
William A. Crandall	I-R	Minneapolis	1979–1980
John Brandl	DFL	Minneapolis	1977–1978
Franklin J. Knoll	DFL	Minneapolis	1974–1976
Gary Flakne	R	Minneapolis	1973
