= Guts (flying disc game) =

Game involving throwing flying discs at the opposing team

Guts Frisbee

Guts Frisbee is played by two five-man teams standing about 15 yards apart. They hurl a plastic disc at each other with force, scoring points when an opponent fails to catch a throw one-handed. It requires intestinal fortitude, top level players must display courage and endurance.

== Game play ==
The Basics:

- The Lineup: The five players on a team stand arm's length apart along their goal line.
- The Throw: A thrower must throw the disc from behind their own line. For a throw to be considered "good," it must arrive within the extended arm reach of the defending team (not too high, not hitting the ground first, and between the outermost players). The frisbee must cross the defending teams line top-side-up, it may not be vertical or any angle past vertical.
- The Catch: The defending team must catch the disc cleanly with one hand. They cannot trap it against their body, use two hands, or let it hit the ground.
- Bobbling: If a player touches the disc but doesn't catch it cleanly, they can repeatedly "bobble" or tip it into the air so that they or a teammate can complete the one-handed catch before it touches the ground.
- Scoring:
  - The throwing team earns a point if they execute a legal throw and the defending team fails to catch it.
  - The defending team earns a point if the thrower throws an "un-catchable" disc (out of bounds, over their heads, vertical, or into the dirt).
  - If the defending team catches the disc cleanly, no points are scored, and they become the throwing team.
- Winning: Games are traditionally played to 21 points, and a team must win by at least 2 points.

Social and developmental play:

- Guts is inclusive: when the force of the throws is dialed down to account for the willingness and ability of the receiving team. This involves the concept of learning with players of the same experience level but is adapted to include any level player willing to play in a manner comfortable to their opponents.
- Bobbling for practice and warm up: stand in a circle and attempt to pass the frisbee around without letting it touch the ground. At any point that you feel you can catch the disc, do so in an upward manner so that if you do not secure the frisbee it goes upwards and not into the ground. Your circle of players are all your team and, as a team, you should do whatever you can to keep the frisbee off of the ground. This includes kicking it up when necessary and passing it to a teammate by pushing it or swatting it when you cannot make the catch yourself.

== History ==
Julius T. Nachazel Trophy

Early History - 1950s and 1960s

Rich Warden, a native of Michigan's Copper Country, first encountered frisbee in 1955 as a freshman at Dartmouth College. Warden subsequently introduced the idea of frisbee as a sport to his home region and spun the discs on the Eagle Harbor beach with the Healy brothers. The first International Frisbee Tournament (IFT) was held in Eagle Harbor, Michigan, in 1958. The main event, Guts, was created by the Healy family - specifically, brothers James (Tim), John (Jake), Robert (Boots), & Peter (Beka). During the 1960s the national profile of the IFT was increased by Jim Boggio. By 1966 it is documented that Guts Frisbee was an organized competitive sport, with uniformed teams, women's participation, regional participation, promotional photography and a sought-after trophy. In 1969 the official rules for Guts Frisbee were written for the 12th IFT and Michigan proclaimed July 6th of that year Frisbee Day. The event received national attention. It was attended by Ed Headrick, Stancil Johnson, Julius T. Nachazel and many others who were memorialized on 16mm video.

The early history of Guts and the IFT often requires an understanding of the cultural context of that era. It was serious sport wrapped in humor and publicity that could sometimes look comic if read at face value. Goldy Norton addressed this in his 1972 book "The IFT has been called a spoof on organized sports. Nothing could be further from the truth." By the late 1960s Ed Headrick was trying to show the world that frisbee could be used for sports as well as casual play. Jim Boggio was promoting the Eagle Harbor tournament as well as tourism in an area experiencing the economic shock of the closing of Calumet and Hecla mining operations. The synergies these two men created help explain the state Frisbee Day proclamation and the Wall Street Journal front page coverage. As the 1960s drew to a close, the center of gravity for frisbee as a sport shifted from the Midwest to California after it was announced that Harvey J. Kukuk (a shared persona long thought to be a real person) was stepping down from the IFT to become the director of the International Frisbee Association in California.

1970s and later

By the early 1970s, the game had spread across the United States and to other countries, with coverage on radio, television, major newspapers, and magazines such as Time.

With over 60 teams at a tournament in the heyday of the game, matches quickly became competitive affairs. Guts has become an extreme sport demanding fast reflexes, physical endurance, and concentration.

Since its rise in the 1970s, when even ABC's Wide World of Sports was televising guts action, and numerous tournaments were springing up, from Toronto to Chicago and Los Angeles, the sport has gradually declined in popularity in America. Guts had been introduced in Asia by the toy company Wham-O in the 1970s, and by the 1990s it had become even more popular in Japan and Taiwan than in the US. Recent years, however, have seen pockets of strong new American players renewing competitive American interest in the game, also drawing some older players out of "retirement".

== Organization ==
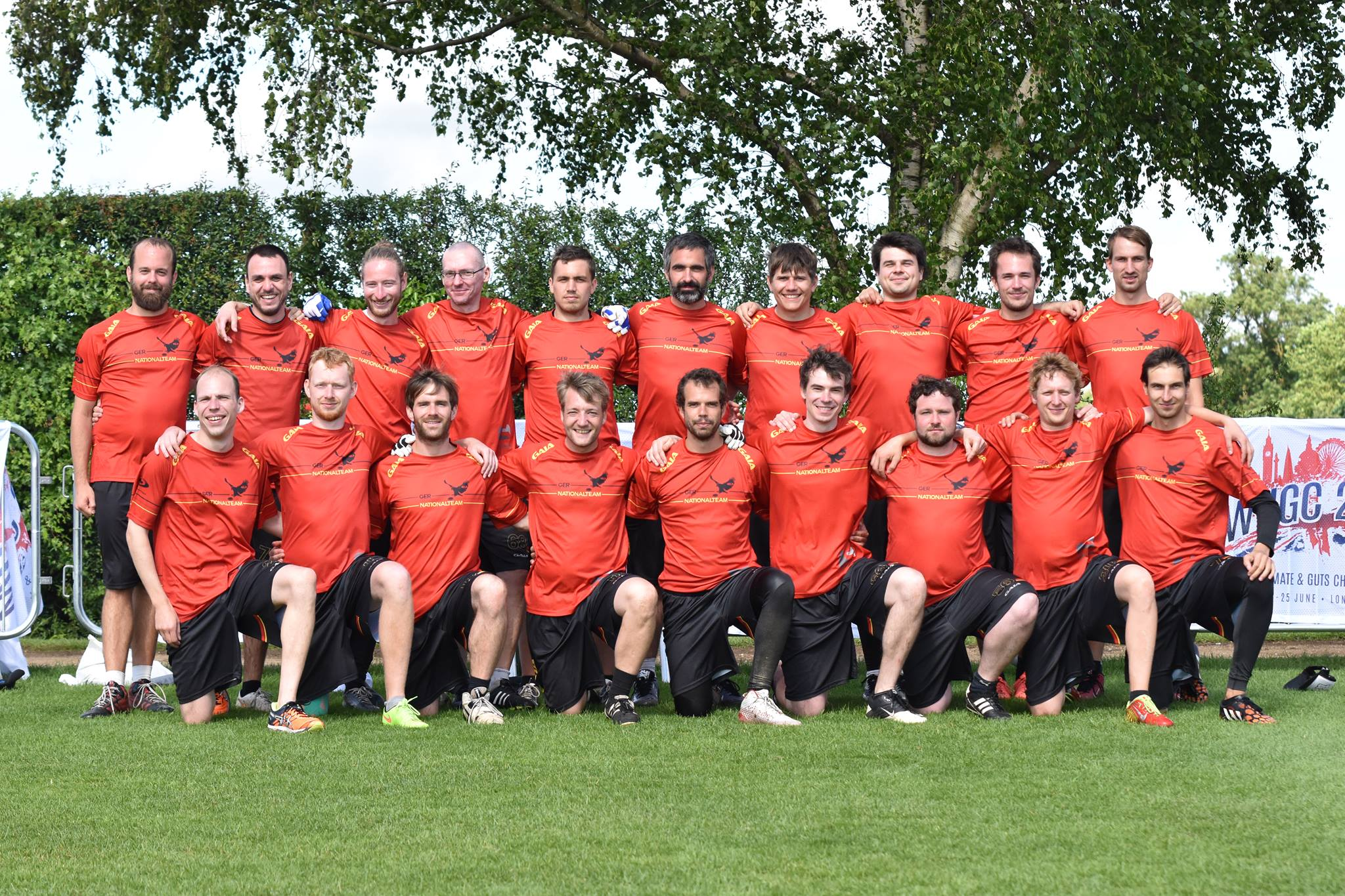
Team photo of the German Guts National Team at the 2016 World Championship 2016 London, England

The sport's international governing body, as with other major flying disc games, is the World Flying Disc Federation (WFDF). For North America, the more game-specific United States Guts Players Association (USGPA) officiates.

The fiftieth annual International Frisbee Tournament (IFT), held in Hancock, Michigan, June 30 – July 1, 2007, was a large guts disc tournament, drawing players from all over the United States and Canada, and for the first time, two strong teams from Japan – including Katon, the WFDF World Champions.

As of 2007, the USGPA plans to induct some of the most outstanding players into the Guts Hall of Fame, joining Fred Morrison (inventor of the original Pluto Platter flying disc), the Healy brothers (inventors of guts and founders of the IFT), and "Steady Ed" Headrick (IFT champion and inventor of the standard "pole hole" basket used on modern disc golf courses).

== See also ==
- Canadian Open Frisbee Championships –(second oldest guts tournament, Toronto)
