= Irwin Toy =

Canadian toy company

Irwin Toy Limited
- The Irwin Toy logo and font "Johnny Irwin".
- Type: Private
- Industry: Toys, games
- Founded: 1926
- Headquarters: Toronto, Ontario, Canada
- Key people: Sam and Beatrice Irwin

Irwin Toy Limited was a Canadian distributor and manufacturer of toys. It was Canada's oldest toy company and remained independent and family owned until 2001.

== History ==
The company began in 1926 as an importer and distributor of dry goods and clothing, located in Sam and Beatrice Irwin's house. Later on, the company moved to a warehouse in the west end of Toronto and focused mainly on toys. Sam and Beatrice's sons, Arnold and Mac Irwin, took over management of the company in the years to follow.

Most of Irwin's profits came from distributing other (usually American) companies' toys. Almost all of the more popular toys available in Canada until the early 1990s were distributed by Irwin. Major American companies wished to sell their toys in Canada, but did not open Canadian branches because of the lower population and tariffs which would generate less income for them. Irwin's success came mainly due to their licensing and contract manufacturing of American companies Kenner and Parker, where Irwin was the Canadian importer and distributor of their products.

The business found success with the help of the Hula Hoop, Slinky, Frisbee, and later on in the century with the popular Star Wars action figures, Care Bears and the Easy-Bake Oven. In the early 1980s, the Atari Video Computer System was a success, and Irwin was the Canadian distributor. Irwin would also acquire the rights to the Sega video game brand in Canada later on. The video game sales helped fuel revenues of $100 million and growth for the company. The company also had a junior shareholders program to have children become interested in the toy company and introduce them to the stock market.

The company had 350 employees at their downtown Toronto factory.

From 1972 to 1987, Ed Hurst, Jerry Inch and Bob Blakely, in charge of Irwin's Frisbee promotions, were instrumental in the introduction of disc sports (Frisbee) across Canada. With the use of performing Frisbee athletes Ken Westerfield and Jim Kenner, Irwin partnered with several major companies such as Lee Jeans, Orange Crush, and Air Canada. Together they sponsored Frisbee show tours and the beginning of organized disc sports programs in Canada. Two successful nationally sponsored tournaments were the Canadian Jr Frisbee Championships and the Canadian Open Frisbee Championships (1972-1985).

During the 1980s and 1990s, major American companies such as Hasbro, Mattel, and Kenner, acquired many of the companies which Irwin did business with.

In the 1980s, with the introduction of the Free Trade Agreement and later, the North American Free Trade Agreement, it became less expensive for American companies to form their own Canadian branches, and Irwin lost many business deals as major toy companies began to distribute toys themselves.

In 1989, Irwin Toy challenged the constitutionality of a Quebec law prohibiting advertising directed toward children. The Irwin Toy Ltd. v. Quebec (Attorney General) case reached the Supreme Court resulting in a landmark ruling regarding the interpretation of freedom of expression provision in the Canadian Charter of Rights and Freedoms.

As Irwin Toy faced financial and business difficulties, the company was sold to a private investment group, LivGroup Ltd. of Toronto in 2001 for approximately $55 million. Eighteen months after the buyout, Irwin Toy, now owned by Richard Ivey and Jean Marie Halde of Toronto, declared bankruptcy and entered into creditor supported liquidation. The original factory was sold to developers for $10 million and converted into a condominium called Toy Factory Lofts.

Following liquidation, the company officially closed down, then in 2003 was re-purchased by the former employees, George and Peter Irwin.

== Brands and toys distributed ==
- 1 vs. 100
- A-Team
- American Gladiators
- Atari
- Bandai
- Barcode Battler
- Caillou
- Dowell-Brown Power Fighters
- Dino-Riders
- Dragon Ball Z
- Easy-Bake Oven
- Etch A Sketch
- The Flintstones
- Frisbee
- Gogo's Crazy Bones
- Ideal
- Ipix
- Jenga
- Kenner (prior to Hasbro's purchase)
- Kids Can Press
- Lil' Sport
- Magic Dip
- Meccano
- My One and Only
- Mighty Max
- Mighty Morphin Power Rangers
- Oopsie Daisy
- Pound Puppies
- Power Wheels
- Predasaurs (DNA Fusion Series only)
- Pressman
- ReBoot
- Robotech
- Sailor Moon
- Sega
- The Simpsons
- Snoopy
- Slinky
- Spawn
- Square-1
- Tyco (prior to Mattel's purchase)
- Wham-O
- Wheel of Fortune
- Who Wants to Be a Millionaire?
- Wrebbit
- Zaks

== Toys and games manufactured ==
- 3D Snakes & Ladders
- Dragon Ball Z action figures & items
- Extreme RPS (Rock Paper Scissors)
- Fib Finder
- Frisbee manufactured in Canada under a Wham-O license
- Girder and Panel building sets
- Globetrotters
- I See It!
- iPix
- i-Top
- Interior Decorator Set (with Marvin Glass and Associates) in 1964
- Irwin Toy Pedal Motorcycle in 1960s
- Lazer Doodle
- Lil Makin Faces
- IToys LCD Handheld & Deluxe Games
- ME2
- My One and Only Guy dolls, like "Cliff the Aviator"
- Oozers
- Paint-Sation
- Powerplay Hockey
- ReBoot action figures
- Sailor Moon adventure dolls & other Sailor Moon items
- Skwooshi
- SpectraColor
- Street Stackers
- Suzie Stretch dolls
- The G.U.R.L.Z.
- Thunderbirds
- Top Corner Hockey
- Trouble (usually under the name "Frustration")
- Deal or No Deal (U.S. version only)

== Sources ==
- Ashdown, Simon (1 July 2001). "Irwin Toy at 75". Kidscreen.
- https://web.archive.org/web/20090609232917/http://www.koskieminsky.com/client_links/IrwinToy/home.aspx
