= Ouf =

Ouf may refer to:

== People ==
- -ouf (familial affix), a family name affix in Norman-French and a French spelling of Arabic names ending with -ūf, see List of family name affixes
- Ouf (surname), a Norman surname concentrated around Le Havre, from Old Norse personal name Úlfr
- ouf, a usual French Verlan word from fou meaning "crazy, mad, fool"
- Ufentina (abbreviated: Ouf.) a Roman Empire voting division, a Roman tribe

Surnamed

- Abdurrahman Ibn Ouf (581-654), a companion of the Prophet Mohammed
- Ezzat Abu Ouf (musician), founding member of Egyptian rock band Les Petits Chats
- Heba Abu Ouf (squash player), Egyptian national champion of squash, cousin to pro squash player Lina El Tannir (born 1987)
- Haji Ouf, father of Iranian artist Aydin Aghdashloo (born 1940)
- Hazem Ouf (businessman), CEO since 2017 of chain restaurant Logan's Roadhouse
- Maha Abu Ouf, wife (married 1981) of Egyptian musician Omar Khorshid (1945-1981)
- Youssef Abou Ouf (1924-1989), Egyptian basketball player

Nicknamed

- Robert Citerne (born 1961, nicknamed "Bob le Ouf") French wheelchair fencer

=== Fictional characters ===
- King Ouf the First (French: Roi Ouf 1re), main character from the 1877 opera L'étoile (opera)
- Ouf, character portrayed by Claude Brosset from the 1967 drama film Shock Troops (film)

== Places ==
- Ouf-en-Ternois, Pas-de-Calais, Hauts-de-France, France; a commune

== Other uses ==
- Nuts (2012 film), originally released and released in French as "Ouf", a French comedy film
- Beijing Eofa International Jet (ICAO airline code: OUF), see List of airline codes (B)
- Operation Urgent Fury (1983), the U.S. invasion of Grenada
- O-Unit Flippase (OUF), an enzymic protein related to the protein family MOP flippase

== See also ==
- Osaka University of Foreign Studies (OUFS)
- Oeuf (disambiguation)
- EUF (disambiguation)
