= MVF =

MVF can refer to:

- Main Variable Figure, a type of fictional mobile suit in the anime Mobile Suit Gundam SEED
- Mamidipudi Venkatarangaiya Foundation
- Man v. Food, a TV series
- Mouse virulence factor (MVF), a family of transport proteins belonging to the MOP flippase superfamily
- mvf, the ISO 639-3 code for the Peripheral Mongolian language
- Montgomery Village Foundation in Montgomery Village, Maryland
