= Oeuf =

Oeuf or Œuf may refer to:

- the French word for "egg", in English used in culinary contexts
- Œuf (river), the upper course of the Essonne River in the Île-de-France region of France
- Œuf-en-Ternois, a commune in the Hauts-de-France region of France
- "Oeuf" (Hannibal), an episode of the TV series Hannibal

== See also ==
- EUF (disambiguation)
- Ouf (disambiguation)
