= DFV =

The abbreviation DFV can refer to:

- Cosworth DFV, a Formula One racing engine
- DeepFuckingValue or Keith Gill (born 1986), an American financial analyst known for his posts on the subreddit r/wallstreetbets
- Dependencias Federales de Venezuela, the designation of most of the island dependencies of Venezuela
- Deutscher Frisbeesport-Verband, the association of frisbee players and teams in Germany
- Deutscher Fußball-Verband (East German Football Federation)
