= European Underwater Federation =

Umbrella organisation representing scuba diver training organisations in Europe

- Abbreviation: EUF
- Formation: 1989
- Type: INGO
- Legal status: Company Limited by Guarantee (incorporated in the UK)
- Region served: Europe
- Members: Scuba training organisations
- Official language: English
- President: Wolfgang Mehl (FIAS) (term 2012-15)
- Main organ: Executive Board
- Website: www.euf.eu

The European Underwater Federation (EUF) is an umbrella organisation representing the interests of scuba diver training organisations operating in both the not for profit and for profit sectors within Europe.

== Purpose and scope ==
EUF seeks to be the peak consultative body within Europe in respect to all matters that concern recreational diving activities, particularly those concerning legislation, regulation and safety. By virtue of the knowledge and experience of its corporate members, it claims an area of competency within recreational, cultural and sporting underwater activities in matters such as the conduct of diving activities (including competitive activities), access to diving sites, training, all aspects of diving equipment, treatment of diving injuries, teaching and the use of recreational diving techniques by professional persons. It claims no expertise in areas involving commercial or military diving.

== Members ==
The EUF has a membership consisting of a broad range of European training organisations, including for-profit and non-profit making bodies. It is incorporated in the UK as a Company Limited by Guarantee. The EUF estimates that its members represent over 3,000,000 divers, 60,000 diving instructors, 5,000 clubs and 2,500 diving schools.

Individual training organisations may apply for full voting membership of the EUF either as profit distributing organisations and non-profit distributing organisations. Organisations that cannot meet the definition of a training organisation can either apply for Associate Membership or Observer status. Two special members also exist: CMAS Europe, which represents the interests of national diving federations located in Europe and who are affiliated to Confédération Mondiale des Activités Subaquatiques and RSTC Europe, which represents the interests of for-profit scuba training organisations operating in Europe. The membership consisted of the following organisations as of October 2012.

=== Profit distributing ===
- International Aquanautic Club (former Barakuda)
- NAUI Europe
- PADI EMEA Limited
- Professional Diving Association (PDA) (Spain)
- SSI GmbH
- National Dive League (NDL-Nord)

=== Special members ===
- CMAS Europe
- RSTC Europe

=== Non-profit distributing ===
- British Sub Aqua Club (BSAC)
- Comhairle Fo-Thuinn (CFT) (Ireland)
- Dansk Sportsdykker Forbund (DSF) (Denmark)
- Sukeltajaliitto, Finska Dykarförbundet (Finland)
- Federazione Italiana Attività Subacquee (FIAS) (Italy)
- Federation Luxembourgeoise Des Activities Et Sports Subaquatiques (FLASSA)
- Norges Dykkeforbund (NDF) (Norway)
- Nederlandse Onderwatersport Bond (NOB)
- Svenska Sportdykarförbundet (SSDF) (Sweden)
- Verband Deutscher Sporttaucher (VDST) (Germany)

=== Associates/observers ===
- Actinia
- Chamber of Diving and Water Sports
- Divers Alert Network Europe
- International Association for Handicapped Divers (IAHD)
- International Diving Schools Association (IDSA)
- National Dive League (NDL) (Russia)
- Professional Diving Schools Association of Malta (PDSA)
- World Organisation of Scuba Divers (WOSD)
- International Association for the Development of Apnea (AIDA)
- Israeli Diving Federation (TIDF)

== History ==
The EUF first became active in its modern form in 1989, initially comprising a number of non profit distributing European diver federations, then subsequently expanding to include the major profit distributing training agencies.

== The EUF and international standards ==
The EUF states that it actively supports the development of both European Norms (via CEN, the European Committee for Standardization) and International Organization for Standardization (ISO) standards for recreational scuba diving.

== EUF Certification Body ==
In 2003, the EUF Certification Body was formed, a joint-venture between the EUF and the Austrian Standards International (ON). The EUF Certification Body, (which is also known as EUF Certification International) exists to offer the recreational scuba diving community a unified procedure of reliable and recognised proof of the quality of scuba diving training services based on European and ISO standards. It audits diver training organisations and service providers and, where appropriate, certifies them as complying with the relevant standards.

As of January 2016, the following recreational scuba diving training organisations have been certified by EUF Certification International since the year 2004:

- Professional Association of Diving Instructors (EUF CB 2004001)
- VDST (EUF CB 2004002)
- International Aquanautic Club (EUF CB 2005001)
- Scuba Schools International (EUF CB 2005002)
- FIAS (EUF CB 2005004)
- American Nitrox Divers International (EUF CB 2005005)
- DSF (EUF CB 2005006)
- IANTD International Association of Nitrox and Technical Divers (EUF CB 2006001)
- SDI Scuba Diving International / TDI Technical Diving International (EUF CB 2006002)
- CFT (EUF CB 2006003)
- PDA (EUF CB 2006004)
- BSAC (EUF CB 2007001)
- NDL (EUF CB 2007003)
- IAHD (EUF CB 2007005)
- NASE Worldwide (EUF CB 2008003)
- VDTL (EUF CB 2009001)
- ISDA (EUF CB 2010002)
- WOSD (EUF CB 2011002)
- Disabled Divers International Ltd (EUF CB 2011003)
- TIDF (EUF CB 2012001)
- GUE Global Underwater Explorers (EUF CB 2013001)
- TSVÖ (EUF CB 2015001)
- NADD Global Diving Agency (S 000513 – issued January 2016)
- WASE (Worldwide Academy of Scuba Educators) (S 000577 – issued August 2016)
- RAID (Rebreather Association of International Divers) (S 000764 – issued October 2017)
- Professional, Technical & Recreational Diving (S S 000786 – issued January 2018)
- ISC [International Scuba Certification] (S 001241- issued July 2021)

== EUF Lavanchy Award ==
On 18 June 2016 the EUF's General Assembly unanimously agreed to create a new award in honour of former EUF Honorary Vice President, Jack Lavanchy. The award will be presented at the beginning of each year to an individual who the members of the EUF feel has made a significant and sustained contribution towards the responsible development of the European diving community.

Winners:

- 2017 – Deric Ellerby
- 2018 – Martin Parker
- 2019 – Don McGlinchey
- 2020 – Franz Brümmer
- 2021 – Peter Symes

== See also ==
- EUF (disambiguation)
