= Israeli Diving Federation =

Israeli nonprofit scuba diving association

The Israeli Diving Federation
- Abbreviation: TIDF
- Formation: 1966
- Type: NGO
- Purpose: Underwater Diver training
- Headquarters: Wingate Institute, Netanya Israel
- Location: P.O. Box 22421, Tel Aviv
- Region served: Israel
- Official language: Hebrew
- Affiliations: CMAS; EUF
- Website: Diving.org

The Israeli Diving Federation (Hebrew: ההתאחדות הישראלית לצלילה, Hitahdut Haisraelit Letslila) (TIDF) is a non-governmental SCUBA diving training organization based in Israel.

The Israeli Diving Federation is active in varied fields. To date it has scuttled 10 vessels to serve as dive sites, and has contributed to the creation of various other dive sites such as submerged underwater archaeological theme parks, the Sculpture Garden in Eilat, and more. TIDF is active in various “green” bodies dedicated to conservation of the underwater environment, the Coral Reef, and natural as well as man-made dive sites along the coasts of Israel.

TIDF obtained CEN certification from the EUF certification body.

== History ==
The Association for Underwater Activities (the former name of The Israeli Diving Federation) was founded in 1966 by diving instructors, navy veterans and members of the Underwater Archeology Association. In the 1970s, the association took care of the institutionalization of diving in Israel and began to hold organized instructor courses. The number of divers in Israel was small at the time and everyone knew everyone. The period was characterized by a light and free approach, which contributed to the increase in diving accidents, especially on the Sinai beaches. In the early 1970s, the diving order was issued in the Slomo region (Sinai), which was then a military area under Israeli control. Towards the end of the decade, the recreational diving law was completed, and the association was appointed the authorized authority to enforce it, a position it held - intermittently - until the end of 1997.

The 1980s were characterized by the institutionalization of diving courses, and the safety rules. The number of members of the TIDF grew from hundreds to thousands, and an Hebrew diving manual was published for the first time, which defined the standards and the various courses.

The 90s were the peak years of diving in Israel. Each year over ten thousand divers, Israelis, and non-Israelis, were certified as TIDF divers. Many diving clubs were opened, and diving became a thriving commercial business. Towards the end of the decade, international diving organizations began to open offices in Israel and the TIDF lost its exclusivity over certifying divers, although many divers continued to prefer the Israeli course, which has high standards and uncompromising safety.

In the 2000s, the TIDF had to adapt to operating in a market with multiple organizations, some of which had operated in Israel for only a few years. The TIDF decided to highlight its uniqueness as an Israeli organization and invested heavily in preparing literature and advanced training aids in Hebrew. In the middle of the decade, the TIDF launched a training program for technical diving, written by the best professionals in the field. At the same time, the TIDF held events and conferences for divers and diving instructors.

== Courses and certification ==
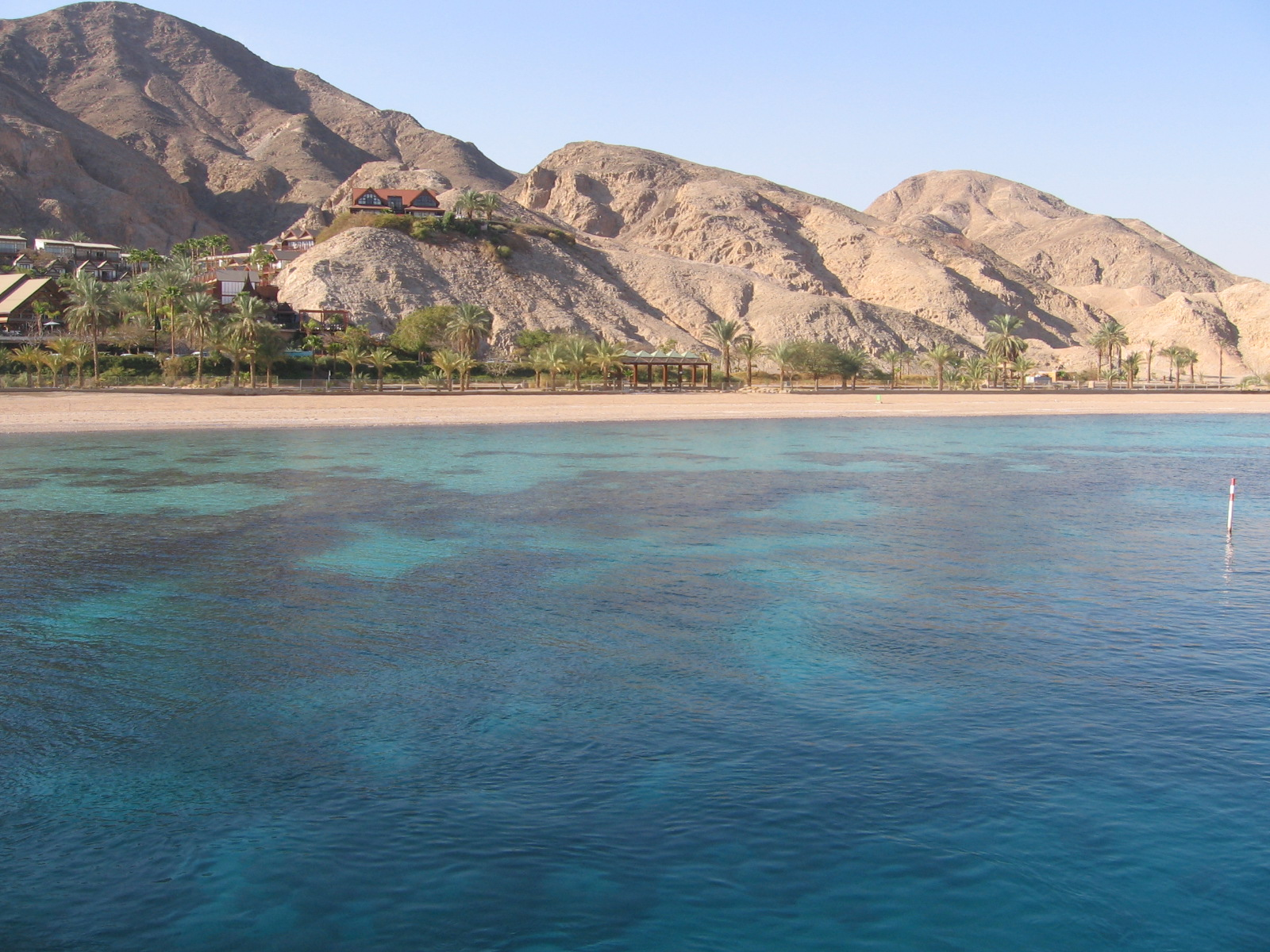
Diving resort, Gulf of Eilat

- club Diver - Supervised Diver (ISO 24801-1).
- One-star Diver – The one-star diver certificate is parallel to Open Water Diver of SSI/PADI (ISO 24801-2). This level entitles its owner to perform dives up to 20 meters (66 feet) accompanied by another diver with Two-stars or higher certification.
- Two-star diver – This level is parallel to Advanced Open Water Diver of SSI/PADI. Two-star divers can dive to depths of up to 30 meters (98 feet).
- Three-star diver – This level is parallel to DiveMaster (ISO 24801-3) This level entitles its owner to perform dives up to 42M.
- Assistant Instructor – This level is an ISO 24802-1 (Instructor Level 1).
- Diving Instructor - This level is an ISO 24802-2 (Instructor Level 2)

=== EUF Certification ===
At the beginning of 2012, the Israeli Diving Federation decided that it would be appropriate to carry out a quality check by external and independent reviewers.

The TIDF invited quality inspectors from the Austrian Standards Institute to conduct an organization audit in accordance with the requirements of the International Organization for Standardization - ISO and obtained CEN certification from the EUF certification body.

== Underwater sports ==
TIDF currently offers the following underwater sports – Apnoea, Aquathlon (also known as underwater wrestling) and Sport Diving.

== See also ==
- Sport in Israel
- Tourism in Israel
