= EUF =

EUF may refer to:

- Egypt Urban Forum, an international urbanization forum held in Cairo, Egypt
- Ethiopian Unity Front, a successor of the Kefagn Patriotic Front
- European Ultimate Federation, the governing body for the sport of ultimate frisbee in Europe
- European Underwater Federation, a scuba diving training federation
- Weedon Field (IATA airport code: EUF, ICAO airport code: KEUF), an airport in Barbour County, Alabama, United States
- Existential unforgeability; see digital signature forgery
- Eva Under Fire, American rock music ensemble

== See also ==
- Oeuf (disambiguation)
- Ouf (disambiguation)
