= Federazione Italiana Attività Subacquee =

Italian non-profit recreational diver training organisation affiliated to CMAS

- Abbreviation: FIAS
- Formation: 1972
- Type: NGO
- Headquarters: Milan
- Location: Viale Andrea Doria, 8 20124 Milano Lombardy
- Region served: Italy
- National President: Bruno Galli
- Affiliations: CMAS; EUF; Confederazione Italiana delle Attività Subacquee (CIAS)
- Website: www.fias.it
- Formerly called: ENAL-FIAS

The Federazione Italiana Attività Subacquee (FIAS) (Italian Underwater Activities Federation) is an Italian non-profit diver training organization. It is a member of:

- CMAS (Confédération Mondiale des Activités Subaquatiques)
- EUF (European Underwater Federation)
- CIAS (Confederazione Italiana delle Attività Subacquee).

It counts in Italy 130 distinct federated clubs (34 sezioni territoriali and 96 circoli).

== History ==
It was founded as ENAL-FIAS in 1968, then changed in FIAS in 1972.

== Activities ==
=== Courses and diver certifications ===
FIAS offers internationally recognized (CMAS) diver certifications.

==== Most relevant courses ====
- Base - 20m, air (CMAS *)
- ARA - 30m, air (CMAS **)
- ARA Estensione - 40m, air, decompression diving (CMAS ***)
- Nitrox - Nitrox diving
- IAA 1 - 50m, air
- IAA 2 - 60m, air
- Trimix 62 - 62m, normoxic Trimix

==== EUF Certification ====
The FIAS obtained CEN certification from the EUF certification body in 2005 for the following scuba diver grades:

- Base certified to EN 14153-2/ISO 24801-2
- Diving Guide certified to EN 14153-3/ISO 24801-3
- Trainee Instructor certified to EN 14153-3/ISO 24801-3
- Federal Instructor certified to EN 14153-3/ISO 24801-3

The EUF register number is EUF CB 2005004.

=== Other activities ===
It works alongside Italian Civil Protection and actively supports environment research and protection projects like the MAC project for the coastal environmental monitoring.
