= Goaltimate =

Disc game

Participants at play in a goaltimate game

Goaltimate is a half-court disc game derived from ultimate, similar to hot box. The object is to score points by throwing a flying disc to a teammate in a small scoring area, through a large semicircular hoop called the goal. The name is a portmanteau of "goal" and "ultimate".

== History ==
Goaltimate was invented by players of ultimate in Wellesley, Massachusetts. It was invented on Christmas Day around 1980, on hard-pack snow, after not enough players for ultimate showed up. It was originally played between the lower spars of a set of H-shaped football uprights. Jim Herrick, one of the Boston inventors, brought the game to San Diego, where it was further developed and replaced the uprights with a large hoop made with PVC pipes. In 1999, Rick and Bibbi Conner, San Diego entrepreneurs with interest in the sport, subsidized a goaltimate tournament with a US$30,000 purse for the winners, inviting top players from competitive ultimate teams. The San Diego team took the prize, defeating a team from Boston in the finals. Through this introduction, the sport rapidly spread across the US as a pickup alternative to ultimate.

In 2016, USA Goaltimate, the national governing body for the sport, was launched.

== Play ==
Play consists of two teams of four players each, competing in a large oval area with the goal at one end and a clear zone in the other. Throwing the disc through the goal to a teammate standing within the scoring area results in one point. A pass through the goal to the scoring area past the Clear/Two-Point Line is worth two points. Games are played to 5, with a 'Best of 3' or 'Best of 5' games in a match.

The disc may only pass through the goal in the scoring direction; passing otherwise results in a turnover. As in ultimate, turnovers also result when a disc is dropped, intercepted, goes out of bounds, or when the thrower is stalled (the thrower has five seconds to throw, the duration of which is enforced by opponents' stall count). Unlike in ultimate, a stall count may be called from anywhere on the playing field, provided it is audible to the thrower. After any turnover or score, the disc must be passed beyond the clear line before the next point may be scored. Play is continuous, with no pause after scores or clears.

Most throwing and receiving rules are identical to those of ultimate. Official rules can be found here 1. However, many goaltimate communities use slight variations of the rules in based on the number of available players, field space, equipment or local tradition.

Substitutions occur on-the-fly, so teams typically take the opportunity to sub immediately after gaining possession of the disc. In pick-up-play, subbing on a mistake (turnover, drop) is the usual practice.

=== Field setup ===
The Goaltimate field is a circle 45 yards (41 meters) in diameter. PVC piping forms an arch (the "goal") 11 feet (3.4 metres) high and 18 feet (5.5 meters) wide at the base and is located at the front of the end zone. The end zone is a half-oval 24 feet (7.3 meters) wide and 24 feet deep. The back of the end zone starts 2 yards (1.8 metres) from one end of the playing field. A poach zone is often set up in front of the goal in order to prevent defensive players from setting up their initial defense at the goal line (which prevents Two-point throws) while the offensive team clears the disc. The poach zone is identical to the end zone and is a half-oval, 24 feet (7.3 meters) wide and 24 feet deep. A Clear Line/Two-point line 24 yards (22 metres) wide and 10 yards (9.1 metres) deep at the center is located 25 yards (23 meters) in front of the goal. The substitution box is at one side of the field. Complete instructions on how to make a PVC set with 1" PVC, couplings, 2 pieces of Rebar and a hammer are available here.

A common alternate field setup which uses a rectangular field is described on the USA Goaltimate web site.

=== Strategy ===
Goaltimate offensive strategy mimics that of a basketball offense's half-court set. Offensive players stand to the fore of the scoring area and make streaking cuts behind the goal. Throwers attempt to either strike through the goal, or, when this is impossible, throw the disc to an open player in position before the goal. Defenders position themselves between the offensive players and the scoring area, and attempt to minimize throwing windows by remaining aware of where the disc is and where a scoring opportunity may ensue.

Even in competitive play, defensive effort against a team trying to clear the disc is often token, as defenders will take the opportunity to rest or position themselves to prevent the two-point play. The soaring passes and long, streaking cuts familiar to observers of ultimate are typically only present in goaltimate games during the clear. The exception to lax defense on the clear is when a team gains possession well beyond the goal, as it becomes advantageous to leave the thrower unguarded, and double-team any cuts that are coming toward the thrower, similar to guarding an in-bounds pass after a score in a full-court press in basketball. Passing is typically quick, with short and fast cuts.

Turnovers occur with greater regularity in goaltimate than ultimate. Scores are frequently achieved in a burst of several in a row, when fatigued defenders find themselves merely chasing their assigned offensive players but unable to safely substitute out.

=== Equipment ===
Goaltimate requires a hoop to play. This might seem daunting to casual folks, but kits can be made using PVC pipe and setup can be done in about the same time it takes to set up an ultimate field. Goaltimate hoops are UV protected PVC (about $200 for a 'kit'). Usually rebar stakes are used to support the hoop on a grass field.

Goaltimate can also be played indoors. One setup used successfully was to put high-friction mats on a gym floor. On top of that were placed heavy cast iron Christmas tree stands. In the stands was fastened vertically 3.5 feet of 1.25 PVC, into which the normal hoop slid. In order to keep the hoop stationary, a bag of rocksalt was placed on each tree stand.

Instead of building a homemade kit, Goaltimate kits can be purchased online. One company, GoaltyLife, has engineered Goaltimate Kits both for indoor and outdoor use. Their kits use a foldable tent-pole style arch and custom anchors for support.

Low-profile cones are used to demarcate the end zone and clear lines. The round field is sometimes changed to a square or rectangle shape to ease setup (or Goaltimate is played with no boundaries).
