= European Ultimate Federation =

- Sport: Ultimate
- Jurisdiction: International (Europe)
- Abbreviation: EUF
- Founded: 2009
- President: Andrea Furlan

Official website
- www.ultimatefederation.eu

European Ultimate Federation (EUF) is the governing body for the sport of Ultimate in Europe. As part of the European Flying Disc Federation (EFDF) and the World Flying Disc Federation (WFDF) the EUF works for the coordination and development of Ultimate in Europe and the promotion of its Spirit of the Game ideals. The EUF coordinates Ultimate associations in Europe, and supports Ultimate in countries where there are no local organization. The EUF organizes tournaments for European teams, develops educational programs and courses for them, and support other activities of interest. Its board of directors is elected every two years, the latest election took place in October 2014.

== History ==
The EUF in certain way is the proactive continuation of the European Flying Disc Federation (EFDF). The EUF was conceived in 2007 out of the need of the European national ultimate associations to have a professional and transparent coordinating body. Formally founded in 2009 under the WFDF, and later under the newly formed EFDF, in the past few years the EUF has evolved to meet and foster changes in the fast-growing ultimate community, while staying true to upholding the ideals of Spirit of the Game. The EUF for instance coordinates youth summer camps and Train-the-Trainer weekends, but most of all, the federation focuses on organizing its big championship events.

Since 2009 the federation has had the same chairman in Andra ´Oddi´ Furlan (AUT). The federation is registered in Guntramsdorf, Austria. There are 35 member associations around Europe which represent their countries.

== European Championship Events ==
The biggest task of the EUF is to organize the great championship events over the year. Yearly there is a club championship, called EUCS. That starts with regional tournaments in five regions and culminates in one big final event come October. Besides the federation used to organize championships for players Under17 and Under20 every year, but these big youth tournaments have changed into a biannual setup (EYUC).

The most important tournament of the EUF is the European Ultimate Championships (EUC) that take place every four year. EUC is a competition for national teams and already started in 1980 in Paris. Therefore it´s the oldest international ultimate tournament that still exists. Until 2015 in Copenhague - Denmark the EUC also had Masters divisions, but as of 2019 the European federation has separated the three main divisions from the Masters. In June 2019 in Gyor - Hungary the EUC will consist of the divisions Men, Mixed and Women, while for the first time in history the European Masters half October will have their own tournament in Madrid - Spain (EMUC).

=== European Ultimate Club Championship (EUCC) ===
Previously named European Ultimate Championship Series. Europe was divided into five geographic regions : North, East, Central, West, South. Each nation (or group of nations if they are very small) could send a maximum number of qualified teams to its European Ultimate Club Regional (EUCR) tournament in all three divisions.

The ideal entry to an EUCR would be from a country’s nationals results. However a National Federation could also nominate its EUCR candidates. These teams competed at the EUCR´s to advance to the European Club Finals (EUCF). The EUCF is Europe's premier club competition and it is held annually. At the Finals there are currently 24 Men´s teams, 12 Women´s teams and 12 Mixed teams. Starting in Bruges 2020 the number of Women´s teams will be elevated to 16.

On 13 November 2019, EUF announced that the 2020 EUCF would see the Women's division increased to 16 teams, keeping the size of the other divisions unchanged: Men - 24 teams; Mixed - 12 teams.

Since the 2024 edition the championship is divided in a regular season, the European Ultimate Club Season and a post season tournament, the European Ultimate Championship Finals.

=== European Ultimate Club Finals (EUCF) ===
Year and Location	Division	(gold) Spirit	(gold) Gold	(silver) Silver	(bronze) Bronze
2025 Wroclaw, Poland	Men	Freespeed (Switzerland)	Mooncatchers (Belgium)	Wall City (Germany)	Clapham (United Kingdom)
2025 Wroclaw, Poland	Women	Iceni (United Kingdom)	BFD Shout (Italy)	Mooncup (Belgium)	YAKA (France)
2025 Wroclaw, Poland	Mixed	Deep Space (United Kingdom)	Mosquitos (Austria)	Deep Space (United Kingdom)	Tiefseetaucher (Germany)
2024 Ostend, Belgium	Men	Ranelagh (Republic of Ireland)	Mooncatchers (Belgium)	Clapham (United Kingdom)	Tchac (France)
2024 Ostend, Belgium	Women	Jinx Midnight (Germany)	GRUT (Netherlands)	Mooncup (Belgium)	Jinx Midnight (Germany)
2024 Ostend, Belgium	Mixed	Sesquidistus (France)	Deep Space (United Kingdom)	Tiefseetaucher (Germany)	Tartu Turbulence (Estonia)
2023 Wroclaw, Poland	Men	Wall City (Germany)	Clapham Ultimate (United Kingdom)	Mooncatchers (Belgium)	BFD LaFotta (Italy)
2023 Wroclaw, Poland	Women	Troubles Warsaw (Poland)	BFD Shout (Italy)	JinX (Germany)	YAKA (France)
2023 Wroclaw, Poland	Mixed	Deep Space (United Kingdom)	Deep Space (United Kingdom)	GRUT (Netherlands)	Reading Ultimate (United Kingdom)
2022 Caorle, Italy	Men	Devon Ultimate (United Kingdom)	Ranelagh (Republic of Ireland)	Clapham Ultimate (United Kingdom)	CUSB La Fotta (Italy)
2022 Caorle, Italy	Women	Mantis (Austria)	CUSB Shout (Italy)	YAKA (France)	Bristol Women (United Kingdom)
2022 Caorle, Italy	Mixed	Mosquitos (Austria)	GRUT (Netherlands)	Reading Ultimate (United Kingdom)	Left Overs (Czech Republic)
2021 Bruges, Belgium	Men	Smash'D (United Kingdom)	Clapham Ultimate (United Kingdom)	CUSB La Fotta (Italy)	Gentle Open (Belgium)
2021 Bruges, Belgium	Women	Box Vienna (Austria)	YAKA (France)	CUSB Shout (Italy)	Dublin Gravity (Republic of Ireland)
2021 Bruges, Belgium	Mixed	Colorado (Germany)	GRUT (Netherlands)	Salaspils Mixed (Latvia)	PuTi (Finland)
2019 Caorle, Italy	Men	Flying Angels Bern (Switzerland)	CUSB La Fotta (Italy)	Clapham Ultimate (United Kingdom)	Chevron Action Flash (United Kingdom)
2019 Caorle, Italy	Women	Dublin Gravity (Republic of Ireland)	CUSB Shout (Italy)	Cosmic Girls (Russia)	YAKA (France)
2019 Caorle, Italy	Mixed	Hässliche Erdferkel (Germany)	Salaspils Mixed (Latvia)	GRUT (Netherlands)	PuTi (Finland)
2018 Wroclaw, Poland	Men	KFK (Denmark)	Clapham Ultimate (United Kingdom)	CUSB La Fotta (Italy)	Mooncatchers (Belgium)
2018 Wroclaw, Poland	Women	Nice Bristols (United Kingdom) Iceni (United Kingdom)	CUSB Shout (Italy)	Iceni (United Kingdom)	Troubles (Poland)
2018 Wroclaw, Poland	Mixed	Maultaschen (Germany)	SeE6 (Sweden)	Hässliche Erdferkel (Germany)	Rebel (Republic of Ireland)
2017 Caorle, Italy	Men	Frank N (Germany) Crazy Dogs (Switzerland)	Clapham Ultimate (United Kingdom)	Bad Skid (Germany)	Flying Angels Bern (Switzerland)
2017 Caorle, Italy	Women	CUSB Shout (Italy) FABulous (Switzerland)	Atletico (Finland)	Iceni (United Kingdom)	YAKA (France)
2017 Caorle, Italy	Mixed	Left Overs (Czech Republic)	GRUT (Netherlands)	Colorado (Germany)	Reading Mixed (United Kingdom)
2016 Frankfurt, Germany	Open	Pelt (Republic of Ireland)	Clapham Ultimate (United Kingdom)	CUSB La Fotta (Italy)	Tchac (France)
2016 Frankfurt, Germany	Women	box (Austria) SYC (United Kingdom)	FABulous (Switzerland)	CUSB Shout (Italy)	Iceni (United Kingdom)
2016 Frankfurt, Germany	Mixed	Reading Mixed (United Kingdom)	Reading Mixed (United Kingdom)	GRUT (Netherlands)	Hässliche Erdferkel (Germany)
2015 Wroclaw, Poland	Open	Crazy Dogs (Switzerland)	Clapham Ultimate (United Kingdom)	CUSB La Fotta (Italy)	Salaspils (Latvia)
2015 Wroclaw, Poland	Women	Nice Bristols (United Kingdom)	Iceni (United Kingdom)	Atletico (Finland)	CUSB Shout (Italy)
2015 Wroclaw, Poland	Mixed	Reading Mixed (United Kingdom)	Grandmaster Flash (Poland)	Yellow Block (Czech Republic)	Reading Mixed (United Kingdom)
2014 Frankfurt, Germany	Open	Gentle Open (Belgium)	Clapham Ultimate (United Kingdom)	Freespeed (Switzerland)	Bad Skid (Germany)
2014 Frankfurt, Germany	Women	Prague Devils (Czech Republic)	Iceni (United Kingdom)	FABulous (Switzerland)	Woodchicas (Germany)
2014 Frankfurt, Germany	Mixed	FlyHigh (Switzerland)	Sun (France)	Grandmaster Flash (Poland)	Terrible Monkeys (Czech Republic)
2013 Bordeaux, France	Open	Ka-pow! (United Kingdom)	Clapham Ultimate (United Kingdom)	Freespeed (Switzerland)	Bad Skid (Germany)
2013 Bordeaux, France	Women	Nice Bristols (United Kingdom)	Iceni (United Kingdom)	U de Cologne (Germany)	Lotus (Switzerland)
2013 Bordeaux, France	Mixed	Cambridge (United Kingdom)	Bear Cavalry (United Kingdom)	Croccali (Italy)	UFO Utrecht (Netherlands)
2013 Bordeaux, France	Masters	Caracals (Germany)	Zimmer (United Kingdom)	UFO Tampere (Finland)	Ultimate Vibration (France)
2012 Frankfurt, Germany	Open	Crazy Dogs (Switzerland)	Clapham Ultimate (United Kingdom)	Chevron Action Flash (United Kingdom)	Ragnarok (Denmark)
2012 Frankfurt, Germany	Women	Nice Bristols (United Kingdom)	Iceni (United Kingdom)	Viima (Finland)	Lotus (Switzerland)
2011 Bruges, Belgium	Open	Clapham Ultimate (United Kingdom)	Flying Angels Bern (Switzerland)	Clapham Ultimate (United Kingdom)	Chevron Action Flash (United Kingdom)
2011 Bruges, Belgium	Women	Eyecatchers (Austria)	Iceni (United Kingdom)	Woodchicas (Germany)	Lotus (Switzerland)
2010 Lloret de Mar, Spain	Open	Fusion (United Kingdom)	Flying Angels Bern (Switzerland)	Skogshyddan (Sweden)	Freespeed (Switzerland)
2010 Lloret de Mar, Spain	Women	Lotus (Switzerland)	Hot Beaches (Czech Republic)	Leeds (United Kingdom)	Iceni (United Kingdom)
2009 London, UK	Open	Wall City (Germany)	Chevron Action Flash (United Kingdom)	Skogs (Sweden)	Clapham Ultimate (United Kingdom)
2009 London, UK	Women	Hot Beaches (Czech Republic)	Iceni (United Kingdom)	Leeds (United Kingdom)	Hot Beaches (Czech Republic)
2009 London, UK	Mixed	Frizzly Bears (Germany)	Brighton (United Kingdom)	Frizzly Bears (Germany)	Gronical Dizziness (Netherlands)
2009 London, UK	Masters	Frisbeurs (France)	Helsinki (Finland)	Age Against the Machine (United Kingdom)	Iznogood (France)
2008 Paris, France	Open	Bad Skid (Germany)	Skogshyddan (Sweden)	Fire of London (United Kingdom)	Ragnarok (Denmark)
2008 Paris, France	Women	Hot Beaches (Czech Republic)	Woodchicas (Germany)	Iceni (United Kingdom)	LeedsLeedsLadies (United Kingdom)
2007 Basel, Switzerland	Open	LeedsLeedsLeeds (United Kingdom)	Clapham Ultimate (United Kingdom)	Skogshyddan (Sweden)	CotaRica (Italy)
2007 Basel, Switzerland	Women	LeedsLeedsLadies (United Kingdom)	Woodchicas (Germany)	Iceni (United Kingdom)	LeedsLeedsLadies (United Kingdom)
2006 Florence, Italy	Open	Flying Angels Bern (Switzerland)	Skogshyddan (Sweden)	Clapham (United Kingdom)	Ragnarok (Denmark)
2006 Florence, Italy	Women	Tequila Boom Boom (Italy)	Iceni (United Kingdom)	Bliss (United Kingdom)	Frisky Bees (Austria)

Performance by country:

Total (excluding Masters division):

Country	Spirit	Gold	Silver	Bronze	Total (excl. Spirit)
United Kingdom	16	24	17	12	53
Germany	10	2	9	5	16
Switzerland	7	3	3	5	11
Italy	3	6	7	4	17
France	2	2	1	8	11
Sweden	0	3	3	0	6
Finland	0	2	3	2	7
Czech Republic	3	1	1	3	5
Netherlands	0	4	3	2	9
Denmark	0	0	0	3	3
Poland	1	1	1	1	3
Latvia	0	1	0	1	2
Austria	2	1	0	1	2
Russia	0	0	1	0	1
Belgium	1	2	3	2	7
Republic of Ireland	1	1	0	1	2

Women's Division:

Women	Spirit	Gold	Silver	Bronze	Total (excl. Spirit)
United Kingdom	7	7	7	4	18
Germany	0	2	3	1	6
Switzerland	2	1	1	3	5
Italy	2	4	2	1	8
Finland	0	1	2	0	3
Czech Republic	3	1	0	1	2
France	0	0	0	2	1
Russia	0	0	1	0	1
Poland	1	0	0	1	1
Austria	2	0	0	1	1
Ireland	1	0	0	0	0

Open Division:

Open	Spirit	Gold	Silver	Bronze	Total (excl. spirit)
United Kingdom	4	10	5	3	18
Switzerland	5	2	2	1	5
Sweden	0	2	3	0	5
Italy	0	1	3	2	6
Germany	4	0	1	2	3
Denmark	1	0	0	3	3
Belgium	1	0	1	1	2
France	0	0	0	1	1
Finland	0	0	0	1	1
Latvia	0	0	0	1	1

Mixed:

Mixed	Spirit	Gold	Silver	Bronze	Total (excl. Spirit)
United Kingdom	5	4	0	3	7
Netherlands	0	1	3	2	6
Germany	4	0	3	1	4
Czech Republic	0	0	1	1	2
Latvia	0	1	0	0	1
Poland	0	1	1	0	2
Italy	0	0	1	0	1
France	0	1	0	0	1
Sweden	0	1	0	0	1
Finland	0	0	0	1	1
Republic of Ireland	0	0	0	1	1

=== European Youth Ultimate Championships (EYUC) ===
Since 2003 first EFDF and since 2009 the European Ultimate Federation has been organizing an annual event for teams of players under 20 and under 17, the European Youth Ultimate Championship (EYUC). In the even years the EYUC only had two divisions, only the U17 divisions, because those years the U20 teams would be at World Junior Ultimate Championships (WJUC). In 2014 and 2016 the name of the tournament changed to Open European Youth Ultimate Championship (OEYUC) when Colombia took part. Since 2017 EYUC is biannual and in 2019 the tournament for the first time had a fifth division, a pilot of an U20 Mixed category won by a dominant Latvia. The purpose of EYUC is to offer younger players the opportunity to be seen on a European stage and demonstrate how much the sport has grown in the younger age brackets. During the Covid Pandemic, the event was cancelled (2020 and 2021). In 2022, after the pandemic, the tournament was jointly hosted by WFDF and EUF. Following the return, the event would only host the U17 division during even years and U20 division during odd years.

	(gold) Spirit	(gold) Gold	(silver) Silver	(bronze) Bronze
2025	Trnava, Slovakia			
U20 Open	Germany	Italy	Germany	France
U20 Women	Belgium	Italy	France	Czech Republic
U20 Mixed	Spain	Hungary	France	Italy
2024	Ghent, Belgium			
U17 Open	Great-Britain (United Kingdom)	Germany	Sweden	France
U17 Women	Great-Britain (United Kingdom)	France	Italy	Belgium
U17 Mixed	Poland	Italy	Romania	Belgium
2023	Padova, Italy			
U20 Open	Austria	Italy	France	Germany
U20 Women	Austria	France	Italy	Czech Republic
U20 Mixed	Switzerland	Hungary	France	Ireland (Republic of Ireland)
2022	Wroclaw, Poland			
U17 Open	Great-Britain (United Kingdom)	Italy	France	Switzerland
U17 Women	Italy	Italy	France	Germany
U17 Mixed	Austria	Hungary	Italy	Belgium
2019	Wroclaw, Poland			
U20 Open	Austria	Italy	France	Great-Britain (United Kingdom)
U20 Women	Slovenia	France	Sweden	Russia
U20 Mixed	Turkey	Latvia	Spain	Netherlands
U17 Open	Great-Britain (United Kingdom)	France	Italy	Belgium
U17 Women	Netherlands	Czechia (Czech Republic)	Hungary	France
2017	Veenendaal, Netherlands			
U20 Open	Slovenia	Italy	Ireland (Republic of Ireland)	France
U20 Women	Austria	Netherlands	Russia	Czechia (Czech Republic)
U17 Open	Austria	France	Germany	Belgium
U17 Women	Austria	Germany	Austria	Czechia (Czech Republic)
2016	Ghent, Belgium			
U17 Open	Austria	France	Colombia	Germany
U17 Women	Austria	Germany	Austria	France
2015	Frankfurt, Germany			
U20 Open	Spain	Germany	Italy	Great-Britain (United Kingdom)
U20 Women	Slovakia	Austria	Italy	France
U17 Open	Austria	Germany	Belgium	Great-Britain (United Kingdom)
U17 Women	Sweden	Netherlands	Germany	France
2014	Lecco, Italy			
U17 Open	Ireland (Republic of Ireland)	Great-Britain (United Kingdom)	Austria	France
U17 Women	Austria	Netherlands	France	Austria
2013	Cologne, Germany			
U20 Open	France	Germany	France	Sweden
U20 Women	Austria	Germany	Italy	Austria
U17 Open	Ireland (Republic of Ireland)	Great-Britain (United Kingdom)	Germany	Austria
U17 Women	Austria	Germany	Austria	Great-Britain (United Kingdom)
2012	Dublin, Ireland			
U17 Open	Switzerland	Germany	Israel	France
U17 Women	Austria	Austria	Great-Britain (United Kingdom)	Germany
2011	Wroclaw, Poland			
U20 Open	Belgium	Germany	Austria	Italy
U20 Women	Czechia (Czech Republic)	Italy	Germany	Sweden
U17 Open	Germany	Germany	Great-Britain (United Kingdom)	France
U17 Women	Finland	Great-Britain (United Kingdom)	Germany	Finland
2010	Heilbronn, Germany			
U17 Open	Belgium	Germany	Great-Britain (United Kingdom)	Sweden
U17 Women	Germany	Germany	Sweden	Great-Britain (United Kingdom)
2009	Vienna, Austria			
U20 Open	France	Finland	France	Sweden
U20 Women	Belgium	Sweden	Finland	Great-Britain (United Kingdom)
U17 Open	Belgium	Great-Britain (United Kingdom)	Germany	Austria
U17 Women	Sweden	Great-Britain (United Kingdom)	Germany	Sweden

=== European Ultimate Championships (EUC) ===
The European Ultimate Championships are the continental ultimate competition for national teams. The first EUC was in 1980 in Paris - France with seven teams in only one division, Finland crowned as Open champions, followed by an edition in 1981 in Milan - Italy with eight countries, Sweden being Open champions. Also the following seven editions of 1982 (Obertraun - Austria), 1985 (Obertraun - Austria), 1987 (Cologne - Germany), 1989 (Vejle - Denmark ), 1991 (Colchester - UK), 1993 (Arnhem - Netherlands) and 1995 (Fontenay-le-Comte - France) were won by Sweden, while the number of participating Open teams never exceeded eleven. All these first tournaments were organized by EFDF, but when in 1997 (Millfield - UK) only five Open teams took part, something had to be done. The World Flying Disc Federation (WFDF) recognized that the year was too full with championships and decided to change the setup of all its big events into a four-year-cycle. The next EUC was in 2003 (Fontenay-le-Comte - France) with again eleven participating nations in the Open division, but EUC Southampton in 2007 was a big success with seventeen Open teams. From 2011 in Maribor - Slovenia the EUF was responsible for the organization and until 2019 the -now- Men´s division has grown into a competition with twenty national teams.

Already during the third tournament in 1982 in Obertraun there was a Women´s division at EUC as well, albeit with only three national teams, Finland crowned champions. The following editions the number of participating Women´s teams rose steadily, although until 2003 it never surpassed the number of nine. Then in 2007 Southampton also the Women´s competition exploded with fourteen entrees. The best Women´s attendance knew 2015 Copenhague with nineteen, but in Gyor it dropped again to fifteen. From 2003 in Fontenay-le-Comte the EUC also had a Mixed division, starting with eight squads. The Mixed participation rose quickly over the years with eighteen national teams in Copenhagen and even nineteen in Gyor in 2019.

Year	Division	(gold) Spirit	(gold) Gold	(silver) Silver	(bronze) Bronze
2023 Limerick, Ireland	Men	Czech Republic	Belgium	Great-Britain (United Kingdom)	Germany
2023 Limerick, Ireland	Women	Czech Republic	Germany	Great-Britain (United Kingdom)	Czech Republic
2023 Limerick, Ireland	Mixed	Switzerland	France	Italy	Ireland (Republic of Ireland)
2019 Györ, Hungary	Men	Finland	Great-Britain (United Kingdom)	Germany	Russia
2019 Györ, Hungary	Women	Sweden	Ireland (Republic of Ireland)	Switzerland	Russia
2019 Györ, Hungary	Mixed	Great-Britain (United Kingdom)	Great-Britain (United Kingdom)	France	Russia
2015 Copenhagen, Danemark	Men	Ireland (Republic of Ireland)	Great-Britain (United Kingdom)	Germany	France
2015 Copenhagen, Danemark	Women	Netherlands	Finland	Switzerland	Germany
2015 Copenhagen, Danemark	Mixed	Norway	Great-Britain (United Kingdom)	Ireland (Republic of Ireland)	France
2011 Maribor, Slovenia	Men	Belgium	Sweden	Great-Britain (United Kingdom)	Germany
2011 Maribor, Slovenia	Women	Netherlands	Germany	Great-Britain (United Kingdom)	Italy
2011 Maribor, Slovenia	Mixed	Germany	Great-Britain (United Kingdom)	Russia	Belgium
2007 Southampton, United Kingdom	Men	Denmark	Great-Britain (United Kingdom)	Sweden	Switzerland
2007 Southampton, United Kingdom	Women	Belgium	Finland	Great-Britain (United Kingdom)	Switzerland
2007 Southampton, United Kingdom	Mixed	Czechia (Czech Republic)	Great-Britain (United Kingdom)	Czechia (Czech Republic)	Germany
2003 Fontenay-le-Comte, France	Men	Ireland (Republic of Ireland)	Great-Britain (United Kingdom)	Sweden	Denmark
2003 Fontenay-le-Comte, France	Women	Ireland (Republic of Ireland)	Finland	Great-Britain (United Kingdom)	Germany
2003 Fontenay-le-Comte, France	Mixed	Austria	Great-Britain (United Kingdom)	Germany	Czechia (Czech Republic)

=== European Masters Ultimate Championships (EMUC) ===
The European Masters Ultimate Championships are the continental ultimate competition for national teams in the Masters division. Until EUC 2015, the open masters division was part of the EUC. In 2019, the first separate masters competition for Mixed Masters, Women Masters, Open Masters, Grand Masters Men was held in Madrid, Spain. Masters in Mixed Masters and Open Masters have to turn 33 in the year of the competition, whereas for Women Masters, the female matching players have to turn 30 in the year of the competition. For Grand Masters, eligible players have to turn at least 40 in the year of the competition.

There were 4 Grand Masters Men teams, 9 teams for Open Masters, 8 Mixed Masters and 6 Women Masters teams in attendance, with France as the only country being represented in all divisions.

A second EMUC competition was held in 2023 in Bologna, Italy. Divisions were expanded to include Great Grand Masters (Age group 48+). Germany sent teams in all divisions. In total, 42 teams attended the event.

	(gold) Spirit	(gold) Gold	(silver) Silver	(bronze) Bronze
2019	Madrid, Spain			
Grand Masters	Germany	France	Italy	Spain
Women Masters	Great-Britain (United Kingdom)	France	Great-Britain (United Kingdom)	Finland
Mixed Masters	Great-Britain (United Kingdom)	Sweden	France	Great-Britain (United Kingdom)
Open Masters	Czech Republic	Great-Britain (United Kingdom)	France	Italy
2023	Bologna, Italy			
Open Masters	Poland	Great-Britain (United Kingdom)	France	Italy
Masters Women	Great-Britain (United Kingdom)	France	Great-Britain (United Kingdom)	Italy
Masters Mixed	Ireland (Republic of Ireland)	Sweden	France	Belgium
Grand Masters Open	Belgium	Denmark	Great-Britain (United Kingdom)	Czech Republic
Grand Masters Mixed	see Masters Mixed	Germany	Great-Britain (United Kingdom)	
Great Grand Masters Open	see Grand Master Open	Italy	France	Germany

== See also ==
- EUF (disambiguation)
