= Ultimate in Japan =

Ultimate, originally called ultimate frisbee, is a non-contact team field sport played with a flying disc, invented in New Jersey, USA, in 1968. Japanese players and teams rose to prominence in the 1990s, and today are among the strongest competitors in the sport globally.

== History ==
The frisbee was introduced to Japan in 1969. Japan Flying Disk Athletic (JFA) was established in 1975 in Nagoya, and started meeting in 1976. In 1984, JFA changed its name to JFDA and affiliated with the World Flying Disk Federation (WFDF), which took part in the World Ultimate Meet. Today, over 3,000 play Ultimate in Japan.

In 1992, the 6th world Ultimate championship tournament was held in Utsunomiya and the final match was broadcast by NHK-BS in real time.

In 1995, GAISF accepted WFDF as an official member. In addition, Ultimate was adopted by a sports class that the Ministry of Education, Culture, Sports, Science and Technology and other groups held. NHK broadcast Ultimate in the program, "television-sports class". As a result, many people recognized Ultimate.

More than 150 educational facilities adopted Ultimate as physical education. In 1996, at the Japan Flying Disk Athletic meet, players were able to get the cup of the Minister of Education, Culture, Sports, Science and Technology. JFDA dispatched players to the world meet and also held meets in cooperation with the US and Taiwan. Japanese teams - both clubs and national teams - quickly rose to become consistent top finishers in international competition:

- Open and Women's silver medallists at the 1998 World Ultimate Championships
- Mixed silver medal for club team Osaka Natto at the 1999 World Ultimate Club Championships
- Women's silver medal at the 2000 World Ultimate Championships
- Bronze medal in Mixed at the 2001 World Games, held in Akita Prefecture, with Ultimate as an official event for the first time.
- Gold medals in Open (Buzz Bullets), and a sweep of all 3 medals in Women's (MUD winning gold), at the 2006 World Ultimate Club Championships
- Open bronze medal and Women's silver medal at the 2008 World Ultimate and Guts Championships
- Silver medals in Mixed at the 2009 World Games
- Open bronze medal (Buzz Bullets) and Women's silver medal (UNO) in the 2010 World Ultimate Club Championships

In 2012, the world Ultimate meet was held in Sakai city for the first time in 20 years and 1,392 players took part, with Japan's women's team beating the US in the final to take the gold. In 2013, IOC dubbed WFDF as a semi-official association and took a step toward becoming an Olympic event. Japanese player Tanaka, who is a member of Japanese Ultimate team Buzz Bullets, went to Taiwan and taught Ultimate to many athletes. As of 2014 July 20, the number of member nations and areas of WFDF is 57, but this is insufficient to become an Olympic event.

== National Championships ==
Although in 2013, four official national Ultimate championships took place, in 2014, two new ones were added.

- Minister of Education, Culture, Sports, Science and Technology Cup All Japan Ultimate Championships. This is the largest national championship in Japan. The winner of this championship is the best of Japan. Divisions: open and women. The 2014 event is the 39th. In 2013, 89 teams and 1,672 athletes participated.
- All Japan University Student Ultimate Championship Series. This determines the best university student teams in Japan. Divisions: open and women. 2014 is the 25th event. In 2013, 111 teams and 1969 students joined it.
- All Japan University Freshmen's Ultimate Championship Series. Only freshmen and sophomores can join this championship. Divisions: open and women. The 2014 event is the 24th. In 2013, 98 teams, 1214 students joined it.
- All Japan Mix & Masters Ultimate Champions Series. In Japan, only this championship has the mix division and the division for masters. Divisions: mixed, open, women's masters. The 2014 event is the 2nd. In 2013, 13 teams and 290 people participated.
- Ultimate Club Team Champions League. The 2014 event is the first. Teams are divided into leagues according to levels. Divisions: open and women.

== Japanese National Team ==
The Japanese National team has a long history, placing 1st at the world championships many times. As of January 18, 2015 the World Flying Disc Association ranked the Japanese team 5th in Men's Ultimate, 1st in Women's and 3rd in Mixed.
