= Capsular-polysaccharide-transporting ATPase =

Enzyme

capsular-polysaccharide-transporting ATPase

Identifiers
- EC no.: 7.6.2.2

Databases
- IntEnz: IntEnz view
- BRENDA: BRENDA entry
- ExPASy: NiceZyme view
- KEGG: KEGG entry
- MetaCyc: metabolic pathway
- PRIAM: profile
- PDB structures: RCSB PDB PDBe PDBsum
- Gene Ontology: AmiGO / QuickGO
Search
- PMC: articles
- PubMed: articles
- NCBI: proteins

In enzymology, a capsular-polysaccharide-transporting ATPase (EC 7.6.2.2) is an enzyme that catalyzes the chemical reaction

ATP + H_{2}O + capsular polysaccharidein $\rightleftharpoons$ ADP + phosphate + capsular polysaccharideout

The 3 substrates of this enzyme are ATP, H_{2}O, and capsular polysaccharide, whereas its 3 products are ADP, phosphate, and capsular polysaccharide.

This enzyme belongs to the family of hydrolases, specifically those acting on acid anhydrides to catalyse transmembrane movement of substances. The systematic name of this enzyme class is ATP phosphohydrolase (capsular-polysaccharide-exporting).
