= MOP flippase =

Protein families

The multidrug/oligosaccharidyl-lipid/polysaccharide (MOP) flippase superfamily (TC# 2.A.66) is a group of integral membrane protein families. The MOP flippase superfamily includes twelve distantly related families, six for which functional data are available:

1. One ubiquitous family (MATE) specific for drugs - (TC# 2.A.66.1) The Multi Antimicrobial Extrusion (MATE) Family
2. One (PST) specific for polysaccharides and/or their lipid-linked precursors in prokaryotes - (TC# 2.A.66.2) The Polysaccharide Transport (PST) Family
3. One (OLF) specific for lipid-linked oligosaccharide precursors of glycoproteins in eukaryotes - (TC# 2.A.66.3) The Oligosaccharidyl-lipid Flippase (OLF) Family
4. One (MVF) lipid-peptidoglycan precursor flippase involved in cell wall biosynthesis - (TC# 2.A.66.4) The Mouse Virulence Factor (MVF) Family
5. One (AgnG) which includes a single functionally characterized member that extrudes the antibiotic, Agrocin 84 - (TC# 2.A.66.5) The Agrocin 84 Antibiotic Exporter (AgnG) Family
6. And finally, one (Ank) that shuttles inorganic pyrophosphate (PP_{i}) - (TC# 2.A.66.9) The Progressive Ankylosis (Ank) Family

All functionally characterized members of the MOP superfamily catalyze efflux of their substrates, presumably by cation antiport.

== Functionally characterized families ==
=== 2.A.66.1 The Multi Antimicrobial Extrusion (MATE) Family ===
Multi-antimicrobial extrusion protein

Identifiers
- Symbol: MatE
- Pfam: PF01554
- Pfam clan: CL0222
- InterPro: IPR002528
- TCDB: 2.A.66
- OPM superfamily: 220
- OPM protein: 3mkt
Available protein structures:
- PDB: IPR002528 PF01554 (ECOD; PDBsum)
- AlphaFold: IPR002528; PF01554

The MATE family is made up of several members and includes a functionally characterized multidrug efflux system from Vibrio parahaemolyticus NorM (TC# 2.A.66.1.1), and several homologues from other closely related bacteria that function by a drug:Na^{+} antiport mechanism, a putative ethionine resistance protein of Saccharomyces cerevisiae (ERC1 (YHR032w); TC# 2.A.66.1.5), a cationic drug efflux pump in A. thaliana (i.e., AtDTX1 aka AT2G04040; TC# 2.A.66.1.8) and the functionally uncharacterized DNA damage-inducible protein F (DinF; TC# 2.A.66.1.4) of E. coli.

The family includes hundreds of functionally uncharacterized but sequenced homologues from bacteria, archaea, and all eukaryotic kingdoms. A representative list of proteins belonging to the MATE family can be found in the Transporter Classification Database.

==== Structure ====
The bacterial proteins are of about 450 amino acyl residues in length and exhibit 12 putative transmembrane segments (TMSs). They arose by an internal gene duplication event from a primordial 6 TMS encoding genetic element. The yeast proteins are larger (up to about 700 residues) and exhibit about 12 TMSs.

==== hMATE1 ====
Human MATE1 (hMATE1) is an electroneutral H^{+}/organic cation (OC) exchanger responsible for the final excretion step of structurally unrelated toxic organic cations in kidney and liver. Glu273, Glu278, Glu300 and Glu389 are conserved in the transmembrane regions. Substitution with alanine or aspartate reduced export of tetraethylammonium (TEA) and cimetidine, and several had altered substrate affinities. Thus, all of these glutamate residues are involved in binding and/or transport of TEA and cimetidine, but their roles are different.

==== MATE (NorM) Transport Reaction ====
The probable transport reaction catalyzed by NorM, and possibly by other proteins of the MATE family is:

Antimicrobial (in) + nNa^{+} (out) → Antimicrobial (out) + nNa^{+} (in).

=== 2.A.66.2 The Polysaccharide Transport (PST) Family ===
Analyses conducted in 1997 showed that members of the PST family formed two major clusters. One is concerned with lipopolysaccharide O-antigen (undecaprenol pyrophosphate-linked O-antigen repeat unit) export (flipping from the cytoplasmic side to the periplasmic side of the inner membranes) in Gram-negative bacteria. On the periplasmic side, polymerization occurs catalyzed by Wzy. The other is concerned with exopolysaccharide or capsular polysaccharide export in both Gram-negative and Gram-positive bacteria. However, archaeal and eukaryotic homologues are now recognized. The mechanism of energy coupling is not established, but homology with the MATE family suggests that they are secondary carriers. These transporters may function together with auxiliary proteins that allow passage across just the cytoplasmic membrane or both membranes of the Gram-negative bacterial envelope. They may also regulate transport. Thus, each Gram-negative bacterial PST system specific for an exo- or capsular polysaccharide functions in conjunction with a cytoplasmic membrane-periplasmic auxiliary (MPA) protein with a cytoplasmic ATP-binding domain (MPA1-C; TC# 3.C.3) as well as an outer membrane auxiliary protein (OMA; TC #3.C.5). Each Gram-positive bacterial PST system functions in conjunction with a homologous MPA1 + C pair of proteins equivalent to an MPA1-C proteins of Gram-negative bacteria. The C-domain has been shown to possess tyrosine protein kinase activity, so it may function in a regulatory capacity. The lipopolysaccharide exporters may function specifically in the translocation of the lipid-linked O-antigen side chain precursor from the inner leaflet of the cytoplasmic membrane to the outer leaflet. In this respect, they correlate in function with the flippase activities of members of the oligosaccharidyl-lipid flippase (OLF) family of the MVF families.

==== Structure ====
The protein members of the PST family are generally of 400-500 amino acyl residues in length and traverse the membrane as putative α-helical spanners twelve times.

==== PST Transport Reaction ====
The generalized transport reaction catalyzed by PST family proteins is:

Lipid-linked polysaccharide precursor (in) + energy → Lipid-linked polysaccharide precursor (out).

=== 2.A.66.3 The Oligosaccharidyl-lipid Flippase (OLF) Family ===
The OLF family is found in the endoplasmic reticular membranes of eukaryotes. N-linked glycosylation in eukaryotic cells follows a conserved pathway in which a tetradecasaccharide substrate (Glc3Man9GlcNAc2) is initially assembled in the ER membrane as a dolichylpyrophosphate (Dol-PP)-linked intermediate before being transferred to an asparaginyl residue in a lumenal protein. An intermediate, Man5GlcNAc2-PP-Dol is made on the cytoplasmic side of the membrane and translocated across the membrane so that the oligosaccharide chain faces the ER lumen where biosynthesis continues to completion. The flippase that catalyzes the translocation step is dependent on the Rft1 protein (TC# 2.A.66.3.1) of S. cerevisiae.

==== Homologues ====
Homologues are found in plants, animals and fungi including C. elegans, D. melanogaster, H. sapiens, A. thaliana, S. cerevisiae and S. pombe. These proteins are distantly related to MATE and PST family members and therefore are believed to be secondary carriers.

==== Structure ====
The yeast protein, called the nuclear division Rft1 protein (TC# 2.A.66.3.1), is 574 aas with 12 putative TMSs. The homologue in A. thaliana is 401 aas in length with 8 or 9 putative TMSs while that in C. elegans is 522 aas long with 11 putative TMSs.

=== 2.A.66.4 The Mouse Virulence Factor (MVF) Family ===
One member of the MVF family, MviN (TC# 2.A.66.4.1) of Salmonella typhimurium, has been shown to be an important virulence factor for this organism when infecting the mouse. In several bacteria, mviN genes occur in operons including glnD genes that encode the uridyl transferase that participates in the regulation of nitrogen metabolism. It is thought that MviN may flip the Lipid II peptidoglycan (PG) precursor from the cytoplasmic side of the inner membrane to the periplasmic surface acting as a putative lipid flippase in Salmonella typhimurium. In E. coli, MviN is an essential protein which when defective results in the accumulation of polyprenyl diphosphate-N-acetylmuramic acid-(pentapeptide)-N-acetyl-glucosamine, thought to be the peptidoglycan intermediated exported via MviN. In Mycobacterium tuberculosis, MviN is thought to play an essential role in peptidoglycan biosynthesis.

Another MVF protein, MurJ, functions as a peptidoglycan biosynthesis protein. A 3-d structural model shows that MurJ contains a solvent-exposed cavity within the plane of the membrane. MurJ has 14 TMSs, and specific charged residues localized in the central cavity are essential for function. This structural homology model suggests that MurJ functions as an essential transporter in PG biosynthesis. Based on an in vivo assay, MurJ acts as a flippase for the lipid-linked cell wall precursor, polyisoprenoid-linked disaccharide-peptapeptide. There is controversy about the role of this porter and FtsW/RodA which on the basis of an in vitro assay, were thought to be flippases for the same intermediate.

=== 2.A.66.5 The Agrocin 84 Antibiotic Exporter (AgnG) Family ===
Agrocin 84 is a disubstituted adenine nucleotide antibiotic made by and specific for Agrobacteria. It is encoded by the pAgK84 plasmid of A. tumefaciens and targets a tRNA synthetase. The agnG gene encodes a protein of 496 aas with 12-13 putative TMSs and a short hydrophilic N-terminal domain of 80 residues. A TCDB Blast search with 2 iterations shows that members of the AgnG family are related to the U-MOP12 family (TC# 2.A.66.12) and the PST family (TC# 2.A.66.2) and more distantly related to the OLF (TC# 2.A.66.3), MVF (TC# 2.A.66.4), and LPS-F (TC# 2.A.66.10) families.

==== Transport Reaction ====
The reaction catalyzed by AgnG is:

agrocin (in) → agrocin (out)

AgnG homologue 2 of Lyngbya sp. (TC# 2.A.66.5.3) is thought to be a polysaccharide exporter.

=== 2.A.66.9 The Progressive Ankylosis (Ank) Family ===
Craniometaphyseal dysplasia (CMD) is a bone dysplasia characterized by overgrowth and sclerosis of the craniofacial bones and abnormal modeling of the metaphyses of the tubular bones. Hyperostosis and sclerosis of the skull may lead to cranial nerve compressions resulting in hearing loss and facial palsy. An autosomal dominant form of the disorder has been linked to chromosome 5p15.2-p14.1 within a region harboring the human homolog (ANKH; TC# 2.A.66.9.1) of the mouse progressive ankylosis (ank) gene. The ANK protein spans the cell membrane and shuttles inorganic pyrophosphate (PP_{i}), a major inhibitor of physiologic and pathologic calcification, bone mineralization and bone resorption.

==== Structure ====
The ANK protein has 12 membrane-spanning helices with a central channel permitting the passage of PP_{i}. Mutations occur at highly conserved amino acid residues presumed to be located in the cytosolic portion of the protein. The PP_{i} carrier ANK is concerned with bone formation and remodeling.

== Other Families ==
- 2.A.66.6 - The Putative Exopolysaccharide Exporter (EPS-E) Family
- 2.A.66.7 - Putative O-Unit Flippase (OUF) Family
- 2.A.66.8 - Unknown MOP-1 (U-MOP1) Family
- 2.A.66.10 - LPS Precursor Flippase (LPS-F) Family
- 2.A.66.11 - Uncharacterized MOP-11 (U-MOP11) Family
- 2.A.66.12 - Uncharacterized MOP-12 (U-MOP12) Family

== See also ==
- Multi-antimicrobial extrusion protein
- Capsular-polysaccharide-transporting ATPase
- Efflux (microbiology)
- Flippase
- Transporter Classification Database
