= German Frisbee Sport Federation =

Sports governing body in Germany

The German Frisbee Sport Federation (German: Deutscher Frisbeesport-Verband or DFV) is the association of frisbee players and teams in Germany.
