= Œuf-en-Ternois =

- Commune
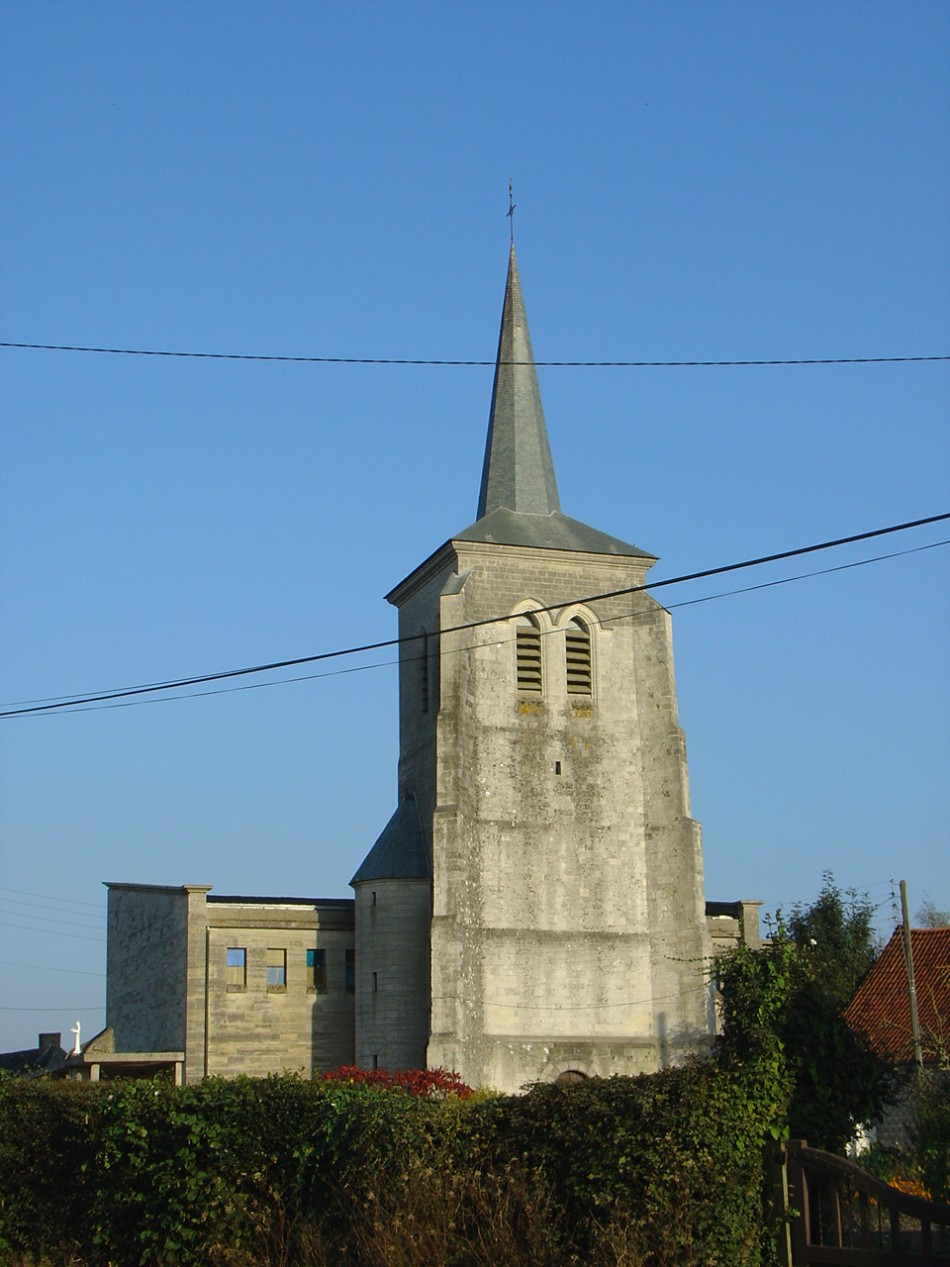
- The church of Œuf-en-Ternois

- Coat of arms
- Location of Œuf-en-Ternois
- Location within France Location within Hauts-de-France
- Coordinates: 50°21′32″N 2°12′46″E
- Country: France
- Region: Hauts-de-France
- Department: Pas-de-Calais
- Arrondissement: Arras
- Canton: Saint-Pol-sur-Ternoise
- Intercommunality: Ternois

Government
  - Mayor (2020–2026): Eric Roussel
- Area^{1}: 8.75 km^{2} (3.38 sq mi)
- Elevation: 118 m (387 ft)
- Highest elevation: 135 m (443 ft)
- Lowest elevation: 64 m (210 ft)
- Population (2023): 251
  - Density: 28.7/km^{2} (74.3/sq mi)
- Time zone: UTC+01:00 (CET)
  - Summer (DST): UTC+02:00 (CEST)
- INSEE/Postal code: 62633 /62130
- ^{1} French Land Register data, which excludes lakes, ponds, glaciers > 1 km^{2} (0.386 sq mi or 247 acres) and river estuaries.

Œuf-en-Ternois is a commune in the Pas-de-Calais department in the Hauts-de-France region of France 29 miles (47 km) west of Arras.

== Population ==
Historical population
Year	Pop.	±% p.a.
1968	250	—
1975	247	−0.17%
1982	227	−1.20%
1990	254	+1.41%
1999	226	−1.29%
2007	253	+1.42%
2012	255	+0.16%
2017	249	−0.48%
2023	251	+0.13%
Source: INSEE

== See also ==
- Communes of the Pas-de-Calais department
