= AeroPress =

Manual coffee brewer (developed 2004)

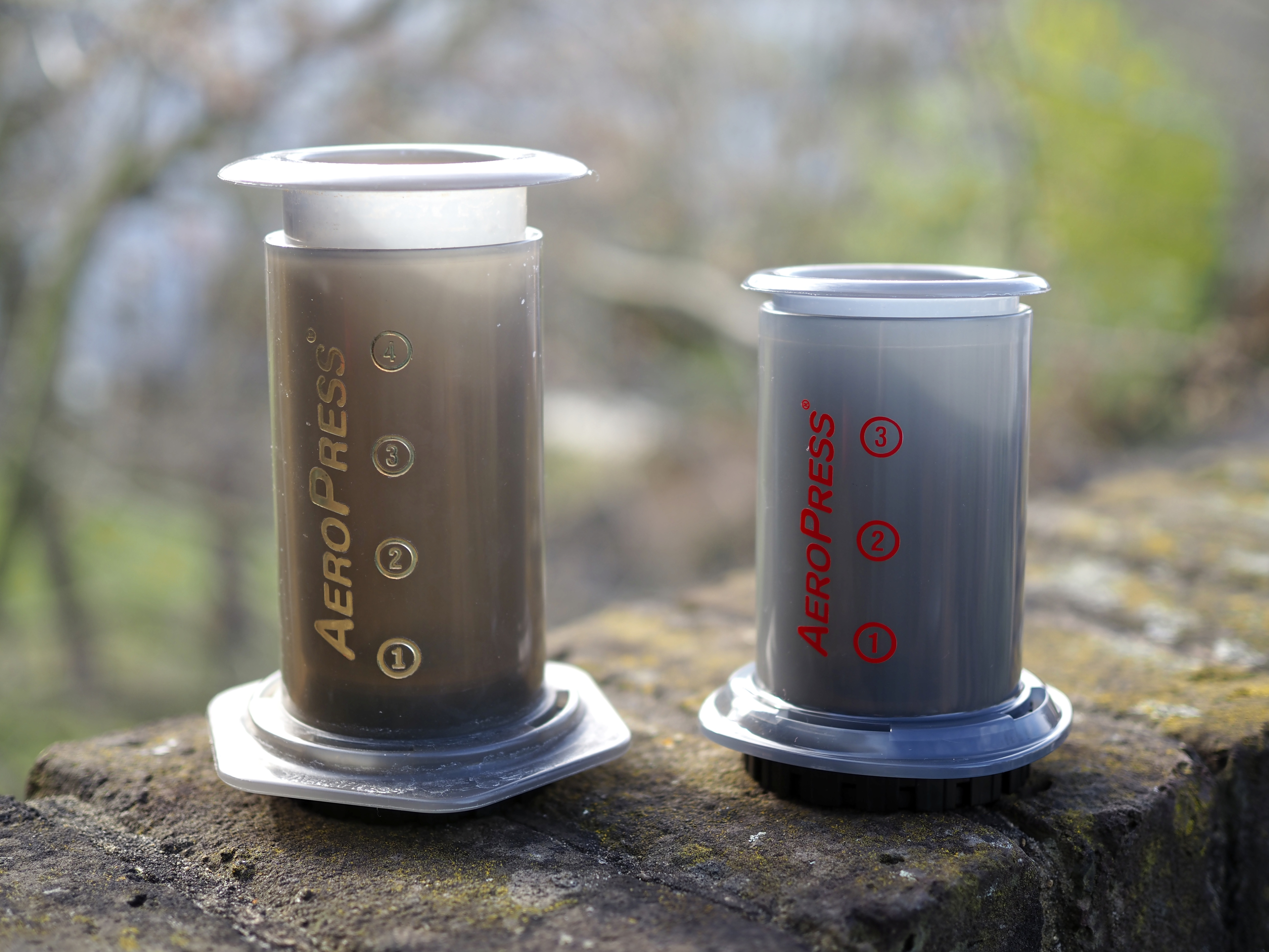
- The AeroPress (left) next to the AeroPress Go (right)
- Classification: Coffeemaker
- Used with: Coffee
- Inventor: Alan Adler
- Manufacturer: AeroPress, Inc. (formerly Aerobie, Inc.)
- Related: French press; Espresso

The AeroPress is a manual coffeemaker invented by Alan Adler, founder of AeroPress, Inc. (formerly Aerobie Inc.). It consists of a cylindrical brewing chamber, a plunger with an airtight silicone seal, and a screw-on cap which holds a paper or mesh filter. Coffee is steeped inside, then forced through the filter by pressing the plunger down through the chamber.

The use of pressure makes it capable of brewing highly concentrated coffee, comparable to espresso, but it can also be used to brew filter-strength coffee and cold brew.

== Design ==
The brewer consists of a translucent cylindrical chamber, and a plunger with an airtight silicone seal, similar to a syringe. A filter cap is screwed onto the end of the chamber, to hold a small round paper filter in place.

The chamber and plunger are made of translucent plastic. Early AeroPress models used clear polycarbonate, but in 2009 switched to BPA-free copolyester, then in 2014 to polypropylene. According to the company, lab tests found that the original model did not leach BPA into brewed coffee. The lettering changed color several times and the plastic changed from clear to gray, but the brewer's design was otherwise unchanged between these versions. In 2023, the company released new clear models made of Tritan.

=== Accessories ===
The base model AeroPress includes a scoop for ground coffee, a stirring paddle, and a pack of paper filters. Earlier units also included a carrying bag, a plastic holder for the filters, and a funnel for loading coffee and pressing into smaller vessels, but as of 2024 these are sold separately. XL models include the scoop, paddle, filters, and a 20oz plastic carafe.

Additional AeroPress accessories, such as pressure-actuated valve caps, reusable metal filters, cold drip adapters, and others, have been available from third-party manufacturers. Over the years, the company released its own versions of some of these products, including several models of flow-control caps and metal filters.

==== Filters ====
AeroPress units ship with a pack of 350 circular paper filters. In 2017, the manufacturer recommended against using metal mesh filters, claiming that paper filters improved taste. In contrast, some immersion brewers, such as the French press, are used almost exclusively with metal filters. As of 2024, AeroPress sells their own stainless steel mesh filter.

== History ==
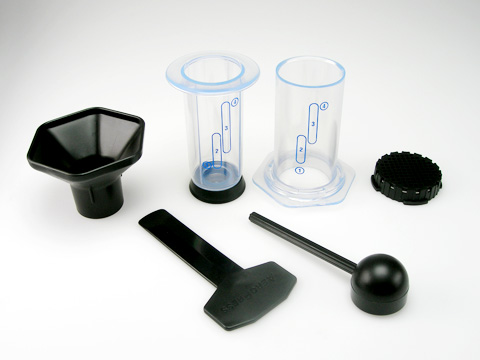
The original clear AeroPress and accessories

The AeroPress was invented by retired Stanford engineering lecturer Alan Adler, who had previously patented and sold the Aerobie flying ring in the 1980s. Adler began prototyping the AeroPress in his garage in 2004, with the intention of reducing acidity and bitterness in his daily cup of coffee. He expressed dissatisfaction with espresso machines, pour-over, and the French press, and wanted greater control over parameters such as brew time, water temperature, and grind size.

Adler sold the AeroPress through his existing company, Aerobie Inc.. In 2017, Spin Master purchased the rights to the Aerobie, and the company was renamed to AeroPress, Inc.

In 2019, they released the AeroPress Go, a travel-sized model with a reduced capacity, smaller accessories which assemble inside of a plastic mug with a lid.

In August 2021, Canadian holding company Tiny Capital bought a controlling stake in AeroPress Inc. Over the next few years, AeroPress Inc. released several more variants and accessories, including the AeroPress XL (a double-capacity model including a plastic carafe), AeroPress Premium and Steel (higher-end models with dual-wall glass and metal chambers), and the AeroPress Go Plus (a redesigned Go with an insulated travel mug), and several clear and colored variants.

== Reception ==
=== Release ===
The device was officially unveiled in November 2005, at the CoffeeFest trade show in Seattle. In the years after its release, it gained a cult following among coffee enthusiasts, who praised it for its low cost, flexibility, and consistency in brewing.

=== World AeroPress Championship ===
The World AeroPress Championship is an international fan-led AeroPress brewing competition. The event is a multi-round, elimination tournament, in which competitors have five minutes to brew coffee. It was first held in Oslo, Norway, in 2008, with only three competitors, but grew in popularity each year after. The 2018 competition attracted 3,157 competitors from 61 countries. The 2020 championship was cancelled due to the COVID-19 pandemic. The championship resumed in 2021, with both in-person events and a new online format, in which competitors create and submit their recipe remotely.

== Operation ==
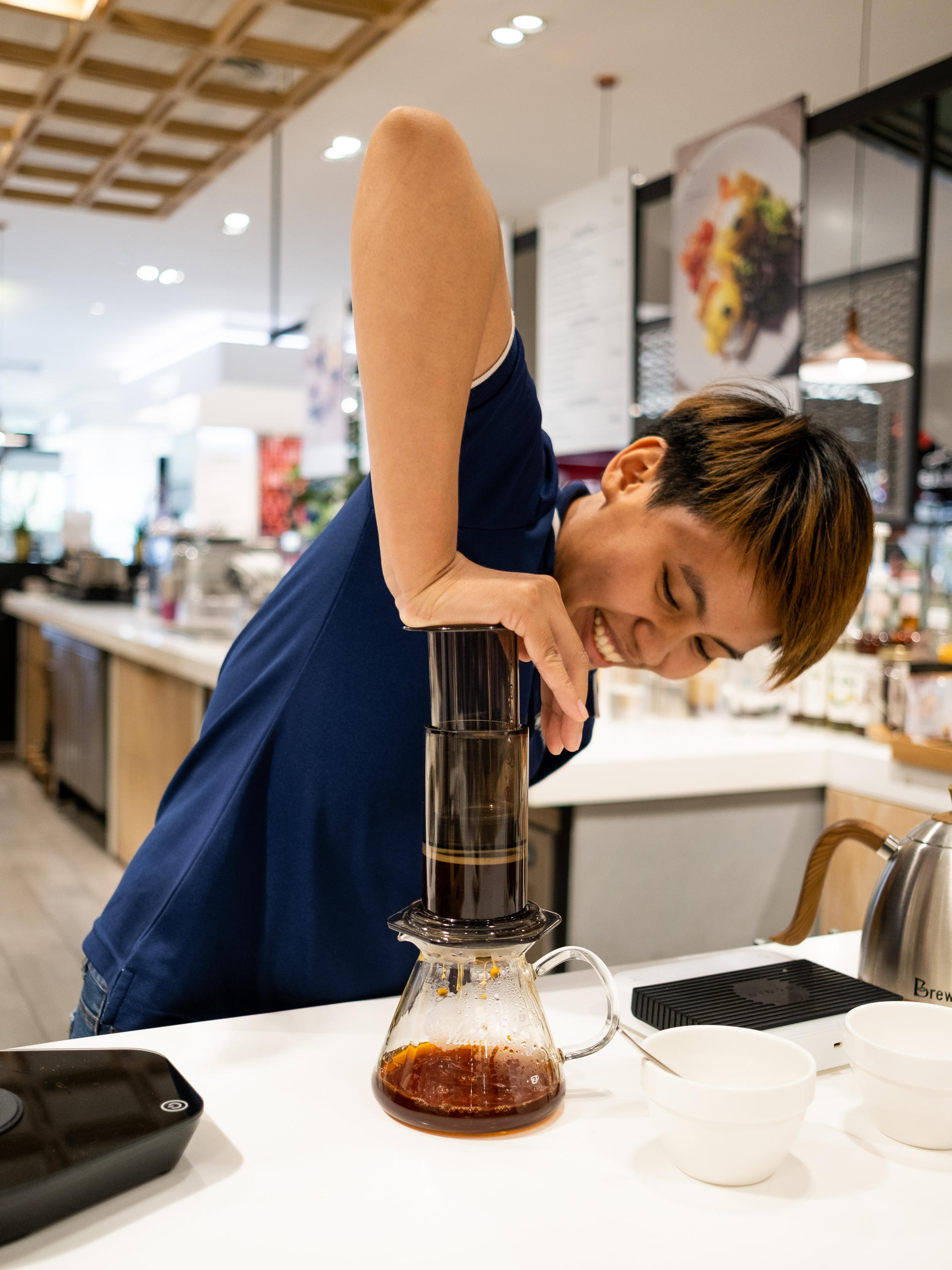
Brewing a pot of coffee with the AeroPress

=== Traditional ===
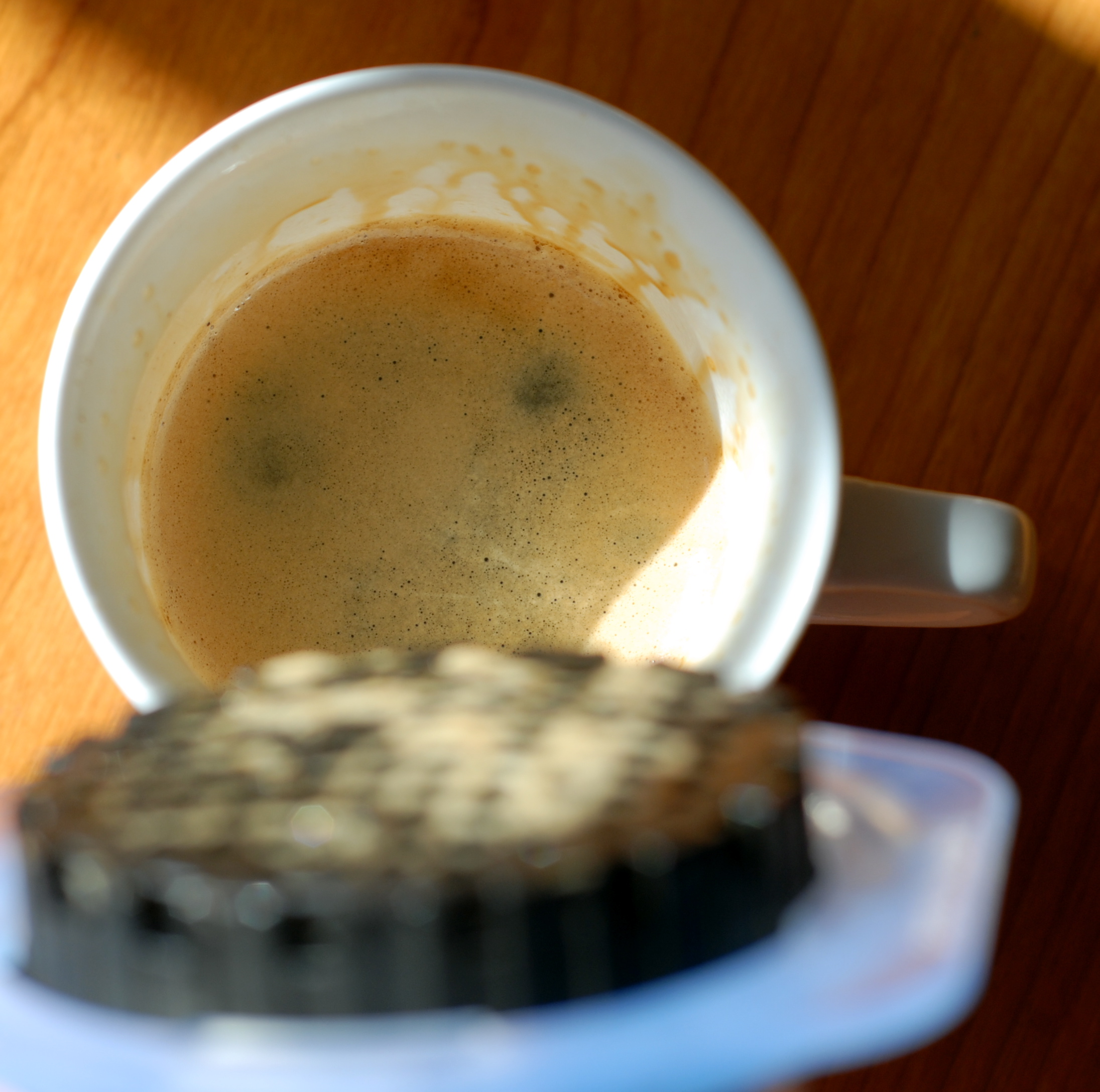
Fresh coffee produced from the AeroPress

According to the instructions, fine-ground coffee is placed in the bottom of the larger cylinder on top of a paper microfilter. Hot water at approximately 176 °F (80 °C) for dark roast coffee or 185 °F (85 °C) for lighter roast is then poured over the coffee; this mixture is stirred for approximately 10 seconds before being forced through the microfilter by pushing the plunger downwards. In the different coffee competitions worldwide (World Barista Championship, Brewers Cup), the coffee is more often ground slightly finer than 'filter grind', and the dose is between 14 and 20 g (0.49 and 0.71 oz), with about 200 to 230 ml (7.0 to 8.1 imp fl oz; 6.8 to 7.8 US fl oz) of water at 80 to 92 °C (176 to 198 °F) and a steeping time of 30 to 60 seconds.

=== Inverted ===
Baristas and coffee drinkers have also developed an inverted brewing technique for the AeroPress.

In inverted brewing, the plunger is placed into the column from the beginning, close to the "top" of the column, and the entire AeroPress stands upside-down, resting on the top of the plunger. One or two scoops of ground coffee are added, followed by water, and the entire mixture then stirred. While that brews, a filter is placed into the filter cap and moistened to help it stick in place then the AeroPress cap is placed on top of the column and screwed into place. Lastly, once the desired brewing time is complete the AeroPress is either turned right-side-up and plunged normally or held at an angle and plunged horizontally.

This method is more similar to the French press, particularly the extended brewing time in which the grounds and water sit together. This makes it useful for using grinds that wouldn't be optimal in the official method such as coarse grinds which might be used in a French press.

== Contrasts with other immersion brewing methods ==
The AeroPress may use a finer grind than other immersion brewers and may take less time to brew coffee, sometimes around 30 seconds. Pressure is used by the AeroPress to aid in extraction, unlike the French press, the siphon brew, or most other immersion coffee brewers. According to AeroPress, it produces coffee with one-fifth the acidity of drip coffee and one-ninth that of French press.
