= Chakram =

Circular throwing weapon from the Indian subcontinent

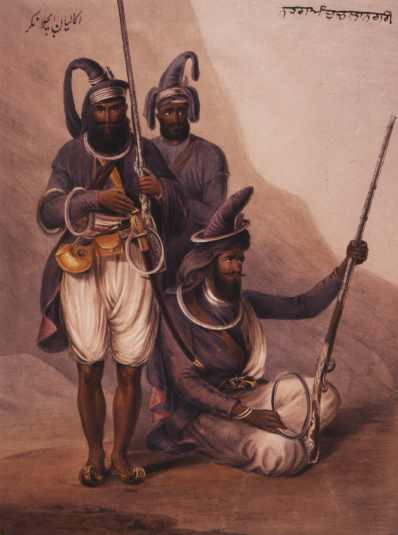
- Sikhs with chakrams, inscribed Nihang Abchal Naga (Nihang from Hazur Sahib), 1844
- Type: Circular throwing weapon
- Place of origin: Indian subcontinent

Production history
- Variants: Chakri; Chakri dang

Specifications
- Mass: 200 to 400 g (7.1 to 14.1 oz)
- Diameter: 12 to 30 cm (4.7 to 11.8 in)
- Maximum firing range: 100 m (330 ft)+

The chakram (Sanskrit: cakra, cakram; Punjabi: cakkra, cakkram) is a traditional throwing weapon originating from the Indian subcontinent. It is a flat, circular projectile with a sharpened outer edge, typically measuring 12 to 30 cm (4.7 to 11.8 in) in diameter and weighing between 200 to 400 g (7.1 to 14.1 oz). It is also known as chalikar, meaning "circle", and was sometimes referred to in English writings as a "battle quoit" or "war-quoit".

The chakram is primarily a throwing weapon but can also be used in hand-to-hand combat. A smaller variant called a chakri is worn on the wrist. A related polearm variant is the chakri dang, a bamboo staff with a chakri attached at one end.

== Etymology ==
The term chakram derives from the Sanskrit word cakra (Sanskrit: चक्र), meaning "wheel" or "circle". This etymological foundation appears in the Rigveda (composed c. 1500–1200 BCE), where cakra refers to literal chariot wheels or metaphorical cycles, such as the wheel of time. In broader Indo-European linguistics, cakra traces to the Proto-Indo-European root *kʷekʷlos, evolving into cognates like the Greek κύκλος (kúklos, circle) and English cycle.

While sharing the same linguistic origin, the term chakra in yogic and tantric traditions denotes subtle energy centers in the body. The weapon's nomenclature evolved regionally, with variations such as chakkar (Punjabi: ਚੱਕਰ) in Punjabi, reflecting phonetic shifts in northern India and specific adaptations within Sikh martial contexts.

== History ==
The earliest textual references to the chakram as a weapon emerge in the ancient Indian epics, notably the Mahabharata and Ramayana (composed c. 5th century BCE), where it appears as a divine weapon wielded by deities. Contemporaneous Tamil poems from the second century BCE record it as thikiri (Tamil: திகிரி). The Arthashastra, a strategic treatise attributed to Kautilya (c. 300 BCE–300 CE), also alludes to cakra-like implements in its discussions of military armaments. While direct physical evidence from the ancient era is limited, numismatic depictions on Greco-Bactrian coins from the 2nd century BCE show deities wielding the chakram, suggesting its early integration into military iconography.

During the medieval period, the chakram saw adoption among Rajput warriors and Mughal forces, where it served as a secondary weapon in close-quarters and skirmish tactics. Portuguese chronicler Duarte Barbosa writes (c. 1516) of the chakram being actively used in the Vijayanagara Empire:

The people of the kingdom ... are very good fighting men and good knights, armed with many kinds of weapons... and they have some steel wheels, which they call chacarani, two fingers broad, sharp outside like knives, and without edge inside; and the surface of these is of the size of a small plate. And they carry seven or eight of these each, put on the left arm; and they take one and put it on the finger of the right hand, and make it spin round many times, and so they hurl it at their enemies, and if they hit anyone on the arm or leg or neck, it cuts through all.

The weapon's prominence peaked with the Sikh Nihang and Akali warriors from the 17th to 19th centuries, who integrated it heavily into their martial code. During the Anglo-Sikh Wars (1845–1849), the chakram was used effectively by Sikh cavalry to disrupt British formations.

The chakram's decline began with the widespread introduction of firearms and accelerated under 19th-century British colonization. The colonial Arms Act, 1878 heavily restricted Indian possession of traditional weapons to prevent uprisings, marginalizing edged weapons like the chakram and forcing martial training into secretive, underground practices.

From its native India, variations of the chakram spread to other Asian countries. In Tibet and Malaysia, a similar weapon was sometimes used that was not flat but thicker and torus-like in construction. Mongol cavalry occasionally used a similar throwing ring featuring spiked or jagged edges.

== Construction ==
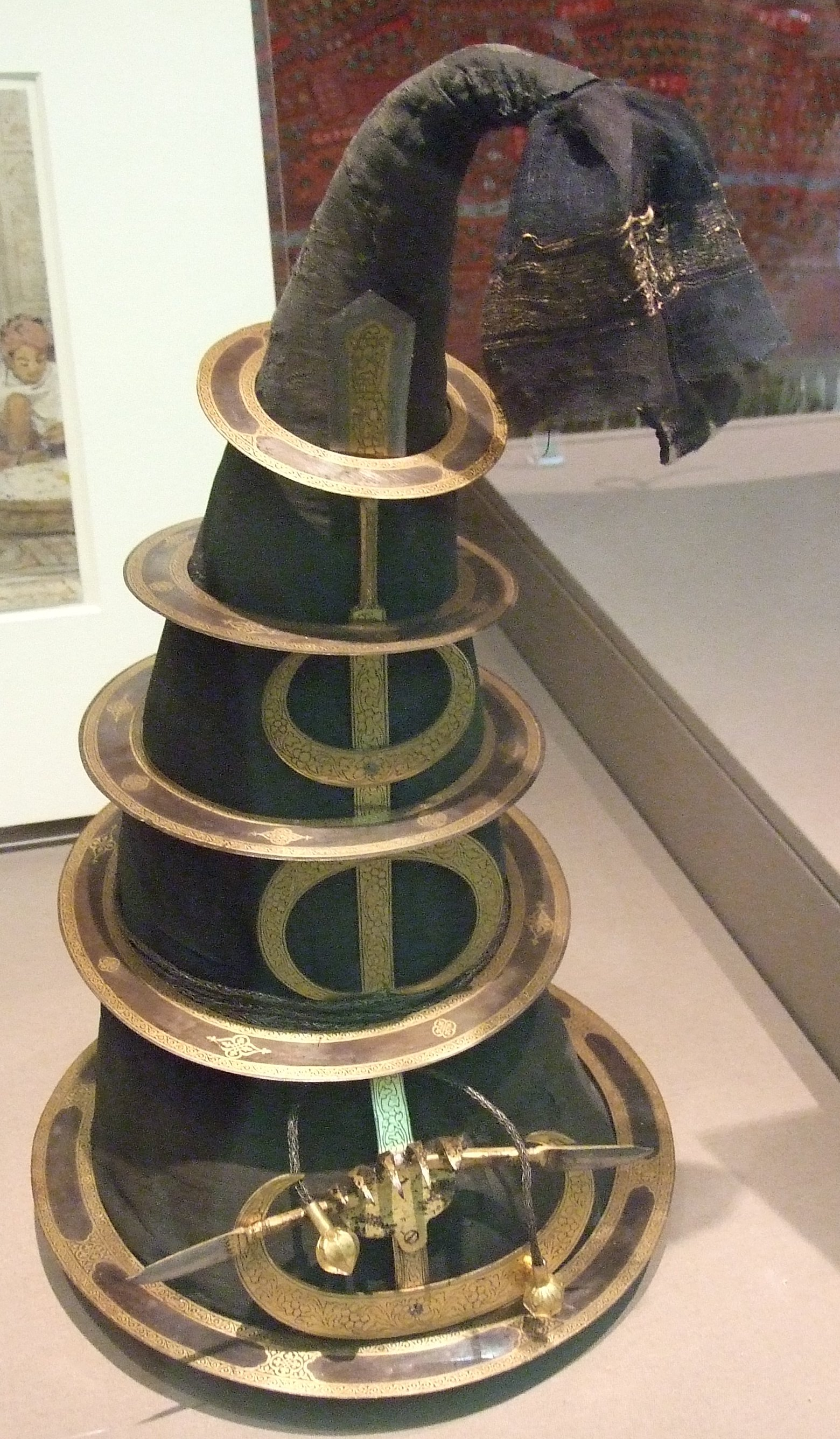
Mid-19th century Nihang turban from Lahore. Cotton over a wicker frame and steel overlaid with gold.

Chakrams are traditionally forged from high-carbon crucible steel, commonly known as Wootz steel, which was developed in southern India around the mid-1st millennium BCE. This steel was highly valued for its ability to maintain a razor-sharp edge, provide balanced weight distribution, and withstand the stresses of repeated impacts.

The manufacturing process began by forging flat discs from heated steel ingots over an anvil featuring a specific indentation for the curvature. The metal was hammered into a circular shape, often with a slightly aerofoil cross-section. Edges were sharpened using grinding stones, followed by polishing and annealing—a controlled heating and cooling process designed to impart flexibility and prevent the steel from shattering upon impact. Many chakrams, including those crafted heavily for combat, were ornately engraved or inlaid with brass, silver, or gold.

The weapon is typically 12 to 30 cm (4.7 to 11.8 in) in diameter, while the width of the metal band itself is usually 13 to 25 mm (0.51 to 0.98 in). Lord Egerton's 1896 catalogue of Indian arms documents this size spectrum, noting rings ranging from five to twelve inches across. Regional differences in construction were common; Sikh chakrams were frequently smaller and highly decorated for turban carriage, while South Indian variants were often broader and optimized for integration with local martial fighting styles.

== Aerodynamics and combat techniques ==
The chakram's combat application and range are heavily dependent on its aerodynamic profile. A common misconception based on the standard ballistics of throwing knives and axes is that the chakram has a maximum effective range of roughly 40 to 60 m (130 to 200 ft). However, traditionally forged chakrams are often crafted with a flat bottom and a curved top, giving the weapon an aerofoil cross-section.

As the chakram flies, this shape generates lift, allowing it to actively fight gravity. The hole in the center also minimizes the low-pressure wake behind the projectile, heavily reducing aerodynamic drag. When thrown at a slight upward angle, a properly constructed combat chakram can achieve ranges in excess of 100 m (330 ft).

The weapon's straight and highly predictable flight path is a result of gyroscopic stability. When spun rapidly, the weapon's angular momentum heavily resists aerodynamic forces that would normally cause it to pitch, yaw, or tumble, allowing it to remain completely flat in the air. The razor-sharp outer edge slicing through the air and disrupting the airflow over the airfoil shape also creates a distinctive acoustic signature during flight, often described as a loud "whooshing" sound.

In terms of lethality, the chakram presents a continuous, spinning razor edge. Upon impact, the high-speed rotational velocity combines with the forward velocity. Instead of simply chopping into a target with a single point of percussion, the chakram slices cleanly through it via localized, high-speed friction. Historical accounts report its ability to sever limbs or arteries at distances up to 50 yards (46 meters). Practical tests have demonstrated its ability to easily sever dense anatomical analogs, such as melons, green bamboo, and rolled tatami mats.

The throwing of the chakram begins with a basic grip, where the index finger is inserted through the central hole for control, often supported by the thumb and middle finger. The most iconic method of throwing a chakram is tajani, wherein the weapon is twirled on the index finger of an upraised hand and thrown with a timed, whip-like flick of the wrist. The high-speed spin adds power, lift, and range to the throw, while preventing the user from cutting themselves on the outer edge. An adept user can twirl the chakram while wielding a secondary weapon (such as a sword or shield) with their other hand.

Because of its aerodynamic stability, silence, and ease of deployment, it was highly favoured by cavalry. Warriors could carry stacks of multiple rings—up to eight of varying sizes worn on arms or conical turbans—for rapid, successive volleys without the noise or smoke of firearms, making them ideal for cavalry charges or ambushes. In pitched infantry battles, it was usually thrown vertically to avoid accidentally hitting flanking allies.

The smaller chakri could be worn on the arms or wrists and used in close-quarters combat like knuckledusters to break or slice an opponent's forearms while grappling.

== Cultural and religious significance ==
In Hindu mythology, the chakram is most prominently embodied as the Sudarshana Chakra, a divine, spinning disc wielded by the preserver god Vishnu. As described in the Mahabharata, Ramayana, and various Puranas, the Sudarshana Chakra is a blazing wheel of fire with 108 serrated edges that enforces cosmic order and dharma. When thrown by Vishnu or his avatar Krishna, it flies through the air, destroys malevolent entities, and returns to its wielder's hand. Symbolically, the chakram embodies the wheel of time (samsara), illustrating the eternal cycle of creation, preservation, destruction, and rebirth. It is often rendered with flaming rims in temple art, portraying it as a fiery disc radiating divine energy.

In Sikh traditions, the chakram holds a central place within the Nihang order's martial code (hukam), where it symbolizes spiritual and martial readiness as one of the five traditional weapons (pancha shastra) carried by warriors. Nihangs traditionally affix miniature chakrams to their turbans and display larger ones during religious processions, such as those at Hola Mohalla, to embody the Sikh ethos of defense against oppression.

In southern India, the chakram also featured heavily in regional martial traditions such as Kalaripayattu, an ancient martial art native to Kerala, where it is still featured in cultural displays and festivals such as Onam.

== Modern uses and popular culture ==
In the 1970s, the American inventor Alan Adler began attempting to improve upon flying toy discs by evaluating their aerodynamic characteristics. He initially tried streamlining the shape of a solid disc to reduce drag, but this resulted in a projectile that was highly unstable in flight. Eventually, inspired by historical accounts of Indian weaponry, he turned his attention to the hollow ring shape of the chakram. This led to the development of the "Skyro", the aerodynamic predecessor of the modern Aerobie flying ring.

In contemporary martial arts, the chakram plays a specialized role within Gatka, the traditional Sikh combat system. Modern training emphasizes safe, non-lethal adaptations of historical techniques, focusing on rotational drills that build wrist and arm control. The World Gatka Federation and Gatka Federation of India oversee competitions globally, which frequently include chakram demonstrations alongside traditional stick-fighting events.

Modern, sharpened replicas of the chakram are heavily regulated in various jurisdictions. In the United Kingdom, possession of a chakram is expressly prohibited under the Offensive Weapons Act 2019, which bans throwing stars and similar edged throwing weapons even in private settings. In India, ownership of traditional bladed artifacts is generally permitted for cultural or collectible purposes, though carrying them in public spaces is restricted under the Indian Penal Code.

The chakram gained massive global recognition in the 1990s through the American television series Xena: Warrior Princess (1995–2001). The weapon served as the signature tool of the titular character (played by Lucy Lawless), who was frequently depicted throwing it in dynamic sequences where it ricocheted off multiple surfaces before cleanly returning to her hand. This dramatized portrayal transformed the chakram into a staple of fantasy action media, heavily boosting its global pop-culture awareness beyond its historical South Asian origins. It frequently appears in Bollywood cinema—such as the epic Baahubali franchise—and in modern video games as an agile ranged weapon, featured in titles such as Assassin's Creed Chronicles: India (2016). In Minecraft, a new weapon, called the “throwing disc”, possibly based on the chakram, was announced to be added to the game in early 2027.

== See also ==
- Boomerang
- Gatka
- Sudarshana Chakra
- Throwing knife
- Wind and fire wheels
