= Bodum =

Danish kitchenware manufacturer

- Industry: Kitchenware
- Founded: 1944
- Founders: Peter Bodum
- Headquarters: Triengen (canton of Lucerne), Switzerland
- Area served: Worldwide
- Key people: Jørgen Bodum (CEO); Rikke Tøgersen (managing director)
- Products: Chambord; Santos; Pebo
- Number of employees: 500 (2001)
- Website: Official website

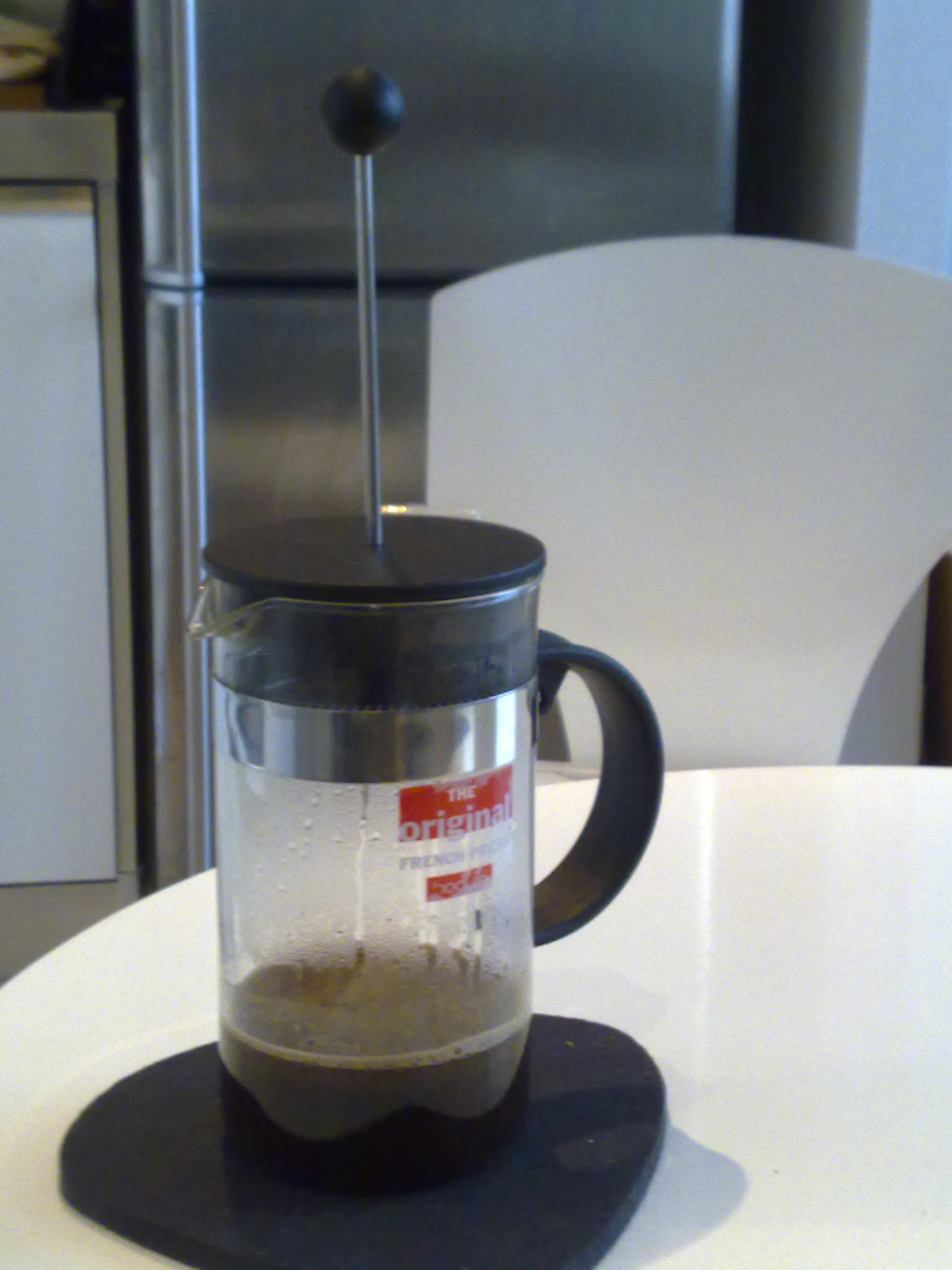
Coffee brewing in a Bodum French press.

Bodum, Inc., is a Danish–Swiss kitchenware manufacturer headquartered in Triengen, Switzerland. Founded in Copenhagen, Denmark, in 1944 by Peter Bodum, the company was moved to Switzerland in 1978 by his son, Jørgen, who continued to run the company as chief executive.

Among the products Bodum markets are French presses, vacuum coffee brewers (the "Santos" and "Pebo"), and double-walled beverage glasses made of borosilicate glass. Their products are advertised as BPA free. The company has tried to register "French Press" as a trademark in several territories, but failed in the U.S., and had the trademark expunged in Canada in December 2012.

Bodum entered into a partnership agreement with American coffee company Starbucks in November 2016 to sell their French presses. In January 2019, the partnership agreement ended as Starbucks recalled defective presses.

Their kitchenware featured on the set of Star Trek: The Next Generation, most notably a glass mug with black handle from which Captain Picard drinks his signature Tea, Earl Grey, hot.

The company remains family-owned under Jørgen Bodum's leadership, co-owned with his sister, Pia Bodum.

== History ==
Bodum was founded at the end of World War II, in 1944, by Peter Bodum in Copenhagen, Denmark, as a family-owned business. In the 1950s, Martin S.A., a company later acquired by Bodum, introduced the MELIOR coffee press, which became popular in the 1960s. In the mid-1950s, Bodum introduces its first vacuum coffee maker, the MOCCA, followed by the SANTOS in 1958, which gained international acclaim.

In 1974, Jørgen Bodum, Peter Bodum's son, assumed leadership of the company and launched the Bistro, Bodum's first French coffee press. The Bistro was internationally recognised for its environmentally friendly design and won several design awards. The business relocated to Lucerne, Switzerland, in 1978.

In 1986, Bodume opened its first store in London, marking its first store in an international retail network. 1991, Bodum acquired Martin S.A., integrating the MELIOR into its product line. The same year, Bodum collaborated with the British Tea Council to develop the ASSAM teapot, utilising a brewing system similar to the French press to enhance control over tea steeping. By 1996, Bodum was operating in nine countries, including the United Kingdom, France, Switzerland, the Netherlands, Japan, the USA, New Zealand, and Australia.

The following year, in 1992, Bodum introduced the e-BODUM line of electric appliances, beginning with the IBIS water kettle and expanded its portfolio to include items such as juicers, coffee grinders and blenders.

Bodum continued to diversify its offerings, including kitchenware, cookware, cutlery, storage solutions, textiles, and other home and office products and, in 2001, added a new store in Birmingham, United Kingdom, and a flagship store in New York City.

== Products ==
The Bodum product line includes stainless steel cutlery, mixers, coffee makers, blenders and other plastic and electronic goods.

=== Coffee Pots ===
Their plunger coffee pots feature glass cylinders with filters made from materials such as plastic, nylon, or metal, depending on the price range.

Chambord French Press Coffee Maker

In the early 1980s, Bonjour Imports, Bodum's predecessor, acquired the design rights to the Melior coffee pot, designed by Martin S.A., and launched the 'Cafetière Chambord,' named after the Château de Chambord. Bodum purchased the rights to 'Cafetière Chambord' in 1983, registering the trademark. In 2003, the American Culinary Institute awarded the Chambord Coffee Maker the Gold Medal Americal Culinary Award.

Melior Coffee Press

The press pot, or "cafeolette," became a popular coffee-making method in the early 1900s. In the 1930s, the company Martin S.A., introduced a coffee pot model with a stainless steel filter, metal frame, and tempered glass beaker. Bodum integrated this model into their product line after acquiring Martin S.A., in 1991.

==== Vacuum Coffee Pots ====
The company has manufactured vacuum coffee pots since the mid-1950s, when Peter Bodum introduced them to Denmark. Bodum continues to produce stovetop vacuum coffee makers and has developed electric models with features such as programmable timers and dishwasher-safe carafes.

=== Stoneware ===
Bodum collaborated with the British Tea Council to develop the ASSAM teapot, which utilises a brewing system similar to the French press, allowing tea enthusiasts to control the steeping process for their beverage.

Bodum collaborated with the British Tea Council to expand their collective product range, with the creation of the Eileen teapot.

Additionally, Bodum introduced the Osiris kettle, designed by Carsten Jørgensen. This kettle features a polished stainless steel body and a durable black nylon handle.

=== Glassware ===
Most glassware is typically crafted from silicate fused with soda and lime. Bodum, however, incorporates boron oxide as a binding agent, resulting in glassware that is clearer, stronger, and lighter than conventional designs.

==== Manhattan line ====
This line of glassware features a double-wall insulation design.

=== e-BODUM Range ===
The e-BODUM range refers to Bodum's line of electric appliances, which began with the introduction of the IBIS water kettle in 1992. This product was part of Bodum's expansion into electric kitchen gadgets and was followed by other items like coffee grinders, blenders, and juicers.

== Company financial data ==
Bodum is a private limited company incorporated in 1984. Its registered office is located in Telford, England, with correspondence handled from Switzerland. Key personnel include CEO Joergen Bodum and CFO Ulrik Krebs Justesen, both residing in Switzerland.

The profit for the year of Bodum Land A/S fluctuated from 2012 to 2020. In 2015, the operating profit peaked at nearly 1.4 million Danish kroner and decreased to about 1.1 million Danish kroner in 2020. The company’s next accounts are due by September 2025, with its last statement made on May 1, 2024.

== See also ==
- List of kitchenware brands
- History of Starbucks
