= Aerobie =

Flying ring for throwing and catching

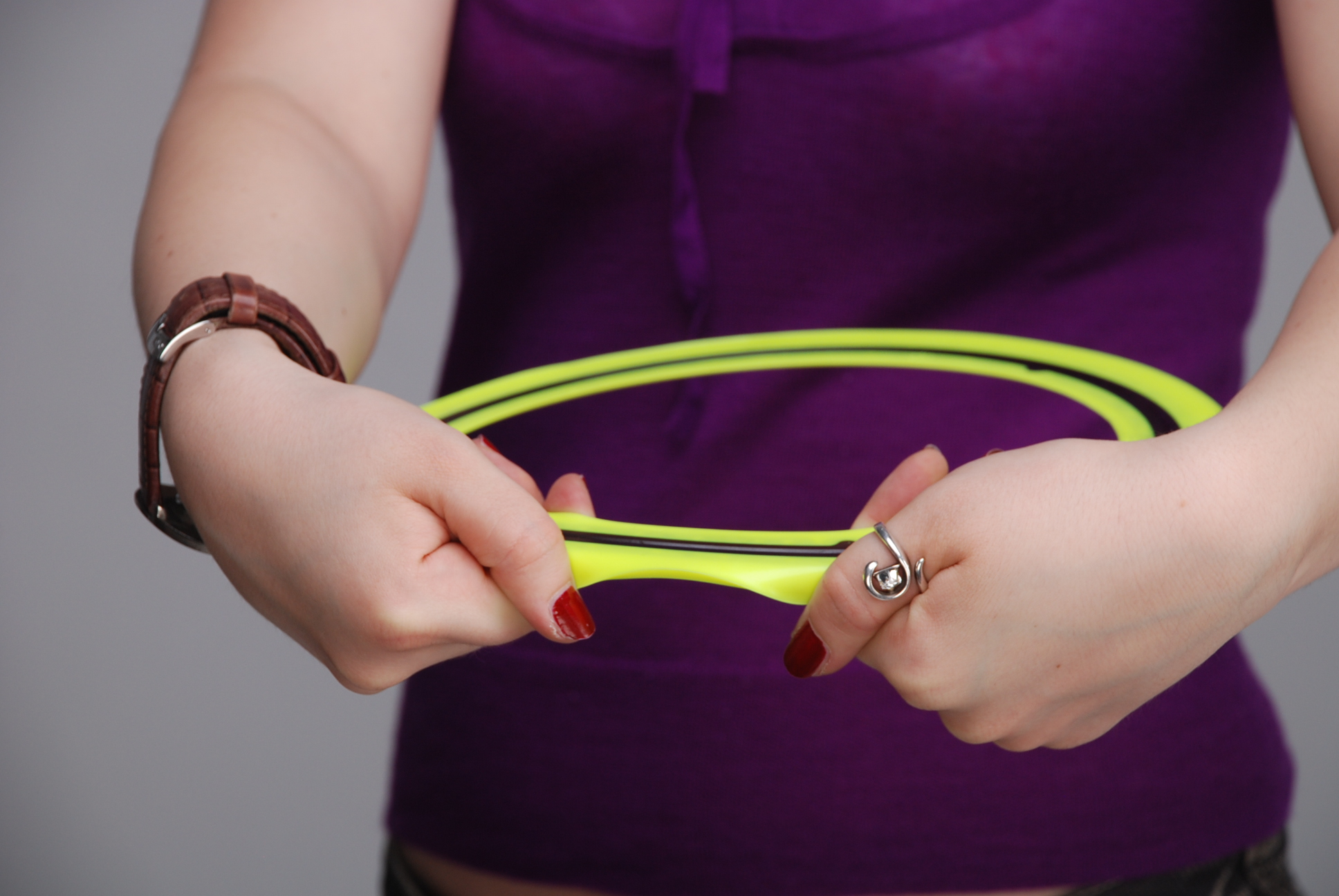
An Aerobie ring

An Aerobie is a flying ring used in a manner similar to a flying disc (Frisbee), for recreational catches between two or more individuals. Its ring shape of only about 3 mm (0.12 in) thickness makes the Aerobie lighter and more stable in flight than a disc. It can be bent to tune it for straighter flight. Since it has very low drag and good stability, it can be thrown much further than a flying disc. The Aerobie was used to set two former world records for thrown objects.

Designed in 1984 by Stanford engineering lecturer Alan Adler, the Aerobie has a polycarbonate core with soft rubber bumpers molded onto the inner and outer rims. The outer rim has a spoiler designed for stability.

In the 1970s, Alan Adler began attempting to improve the flying disc, considering its design characteristics. He tried streamlining the shape to reduce drag, but this resulted in a disc that was more unstable in flight. This led to the development of the predecessor of the Aerobie, which was called the "Skyro". About a million of this model were sold. In 1980, it was used to set a Guinness World Record throw of 261 meters (856 ft). It lacked the spoiler rim of the Aerobie. It had low drag, but was stable at only a certain speed. The later introduction of the spoiler, which balanced the lift, made the ring stable "over a wide range of speeds". After testing several models, the ideal shape was found, and the Aerobie was produced. Adler founded Superflight, Inc. (later known as Aerobie, Inc.) in 1984.

In 2017, the rights to the Aerobie flying ring and other Aerobie assets were sold to Swimways, a subsidiary of Spin Master, and the company was renamed to AeroPress, Inc.

== Characteristics ==
The Aerobie allows for throws over unusually long distances. It flies faster and further than a common flying disc. When well tuned, it can fly in a straight line, "like a puck on an invisible sheet of ice". It does not have the tendency to roll when thrown level, as a flying disc does. Similarly to a disc, an Aerobie can be thrown in a curved path by throwing it in a slant. Its lift depends on its speed relative to the air. Therefore, throwing into the wind makes it fly higher and throwing with the wind makes it fly lower.

=== Advantages ===
The Aerobie's ring shape allows it to be caught in a variety of different ways. For example, it can be caught by thrusting a forearm, the head (when the ring is thrown high), or even a foot through the middle. Games such as "Aerosticks" and Aerogoal are designed specifically for the Aerobie.

=== Disadvantages, special care ===
An Aerobie ring does not float in water. It can be easier to lose than a flying disc, especially over long distances, and its low profile can make it hard to spot on the ground. It also gets caught on tree branches more easily. The Aerobie is best thrown in a wide open area such as a football or soccer field, away from bodies of water, roofs, trees, roads, etc. Adequate light is also important.

When lost near the coast, the rings constitute a hazard for marine life, especially young seals, who may poke their heads through them, where they become stuck and cause wounds. Several councils in England and Wales have banned their use on beaches, and some British retailers have voluntarily stopped selling them.

== World records ==
The 13-inch (330 mm) Aerobie Pro was used to set the Guinness World Record twice for the "longest throw of an object without any velocity-aiding feature". The Aerobie's first Guinness World Record was set by Scott Zimmerman at 1,257 feet (383 meters) in 1986 at Fort Funston, San Francisco. The 1986 record was broken by Erin Hemmings with a throw of 1,333 feet (406 meters) on July 14, 2003, at Fort Funston. Hemmings' Aerobie was airborne for 30 seconds (not an official measurement) and was the first thrown object to break the quarter-mile barrier (402 meters or 1,320 feet).

Previous to the 1986 record, the Aerobie held the world record at 1,046 feet 11 inches (319.10 meters). It does not appear that this was recorded by Guinness. On June 7, 1988, the Aerobie became the first object to be thrown across Niagara Falls with a throw by Scott Zimmerman. In April 1987, Zimmerman threw a silver dollar taped to an Aerobie across the Potomac River.

Since the introduction of the Aerobie, Superflight has offered reward money for various landmark throws. While details of the earlier rewards are unclear, the current reward is $1,000 to anyone who sets the Guinness World Distance Record.

== See also ==
- Boomerang
- Chakram
- Lee-Richards annular monoplane
