= James Robert Napier =

James Robert Napier, FRS (12 September 1821 – 13 December 1879), Scottish engineer and scientific writer, was the inventor of Napier's diagram, a tool for nautical navigation.

== Early life and education ==
James Robert Napier was born in Camlachie, Glasgow in 1821, the son of father Robert Napier, himself a noted shipbuilder. He was educated at the High School of Glasgow, where he was found to excel at mathematics, and graduated from the University of Glasgow.

== Shipbuilder ==
Napier was placed in charge of his father's shipbuilding business in 1842.

In 1848 he married Emma Mary Twentyman, daughter of the silversmith Lawrence Holme Twentyman, and together they had seven children.

Napier carried out a series of experiments, measuring errors in compass navigation, and published his findings in 1851. This was called Napier's Diagram, and it was a graphic method of correcting deviation of a ship's compass, which is still referenced in navigation books.

Napier worked with the engineer and physicist William Rankine to attempt to improve naval engineering, including patenting an air engine (founded on the thermodynamic principle that temperature difference governs engine efficiency) with him in 1853, but the engine never saw widespread use. In 1853, he was also made a full partner in his father's business, which became R. Napier & Sons.

== Later career ==
Exhausted from the frantic schedule required to build HMS Erebus in 1856 for the British government during the Crimean War, Napier in 1857 left the shipbuilding business he had been running for the previous 15 years and started other, less successful ventures.

He started his own shipyard shortly thereafter, but soon closed the business, citing his failing health, and took an interest in the West of Scotland Fishery Company, but this venture too proved unsuccessful. His next was to run one of his iron ships, the "Lancefield", as a ferry for cargo and passengers between Ardrossan and Belfast. While this business was a moderate success, it led to legal troubles with the Glasgow and South-Western Railway Company. Although Napier won this legal battle, he subsequently sold the "Lancefield", ending his interest in shipping. After that he worked occasionally on commission as an engineering consultant. In this he helped to design a ship to navigate the Godaveri river in Kaleshwaram, India.

== Professional memberships ==
Napier was a member of The Royal Philosophical Society of Glasgow, the Royal Institution of Naval Architects, and the British Association for the Advancement of Science, and President of The Institution of Engineers and Shipbuilders in Scotland from 1863 to 1865. He was inducted into the Royal Society of London in 1867.

== Death ==
James Robert Napier died in Glasgow in December 1879, after contracting an illness while boating on Loch Lomond.

== Bibliography ==
- Shipbuilding, Theoretical and Practical 1866 (with William Rankine and others)
- On pressure logs for measuring the speed of ships 1872
- On British weights and measures: The pound or libric system 1873
- On the economy of fuel in domestic arrangements 1874
- On the chemical and microscopical analysis of an unsound wine 1878
- Memoir of the late... David Elder 1891 (published posthumously)

== See also ==
- Napier coffeemaker
