= Johann Gottlieb Nörrenberg =

German physicist (1787–1862)

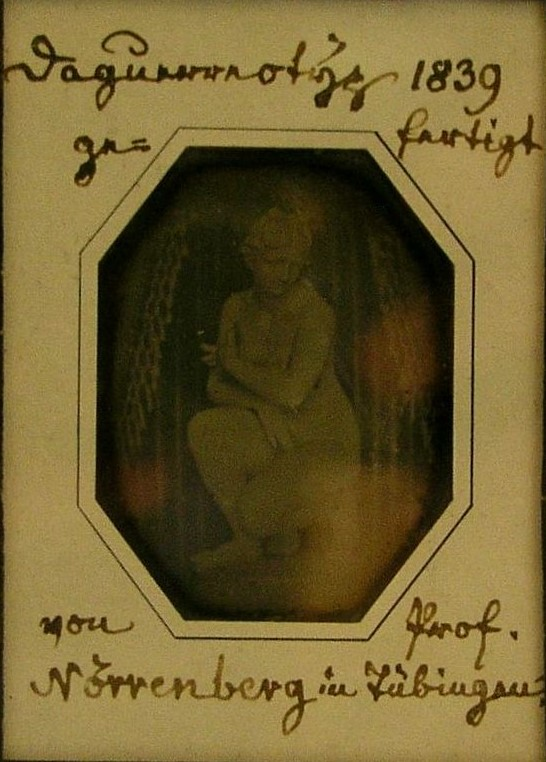
1839 daguerreotype by Nörrenberg

Johann Gottlieb Christian Nörrenberg (born 11 August 1787 in Pustenbach; died 20 July 1862) was a German physicist who worked on the polarization of light. His name is often misspelled "Nörremberg".

From 1823 he taught classes in mathematics and physics at the military school in Darmstadt. In 1833 he became a professor of mathematics, physics and astronomy at the University of Tübingen, where he worked on surveying and the development of optical instruments. Among his better known creations were the "Nörrenberg polariscope" and the vacuum coffee maker.
