= Vacuum coffee maker =

Device used to brew coffee

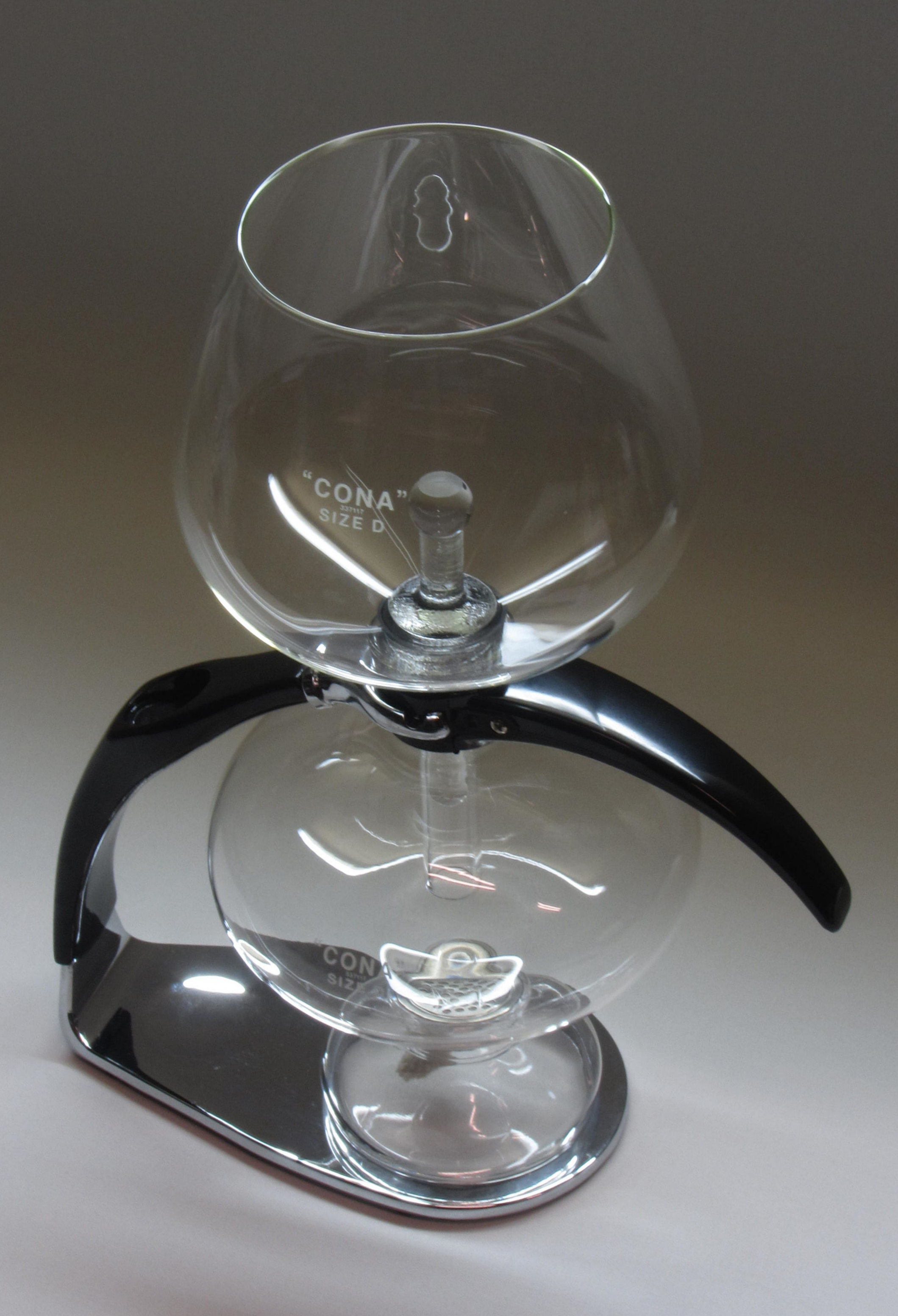
A vacuum coffee maker. Industrial design-classic by Abram Games.

A vacuum coffee maker brews coffee using two chambers where vapor pressure and gravity produce coffee. This type of coffee maker is also known as vac pot, siphon or syphon coffee maker, and was invented by Johann Nörrenberg in 1827.

== History and design ==
Since their invention these devices have been used in many parts of the world. While vacuum coffee makers generally were excessively complex for everyday use, they were prized for producing a clear brew, and were quite popular until the middle of the twentieth century. Vacuum coffee makers remain popular in some parts of Asia, including Japan and Taiwan.

Design and composition of the vacuum coffee maker varies. The chamber material is borosilicate glass, metal, or plastic, and the filter can be either a glass rod or a screen made of metal, cloth, paper, or nylon. The Napier Vacuum Machine by James Robert Napier, presented in 1840, was an early example of the vacuum brewing process. The Bauhaus interpretation of this device can be seen in Gerhard Marcks' Sintrax coffee maker of 1925.

=== Balance siphon ===
An early variation of this principle is called a balance siphon or Belgian brewer. This implementation has the two chambers arranged side by side on a balance-like device, with a counterweight attached to the heated chamber. Once the vapor has forced the hot water out, the counterweight activates a spring-loaded snuffer which smothers the flame and allows the initial chamber to cool down thus lowering pressure (creating a vacuum) and causing the brewed coffee to seep in.

=== Automated version ===
In 2022, the Japanese Tiger Corporation released an automated coffee-maker based on the vacuum coffee maker principle, which was marketed as the Siphonysta. The Siphonysta's heating is electrical. The chambers are made of plastic ("resin").

== Brewing principle ==
Vacuum pot coffee brewer: vapor pressure forces the water into the upper chamber.

A vacuum coffee maker operates as a siphon, where heating and cooling the lower vessel changes the vapor pressure of water in the lower, first pushing the water up into the upper vessel, where the coffee is brewed, then allowing the brewed coffee to be strained as it is drawn back down into the lower vessel.

Specifically, by heating (A) the water in the sealed lower vessel (B), the combination of its vapor pressure (the pressure exerted by the vapor component of a liquid) and the pressure from heating the air will exceed the ambient standard atmospheric pressure, causing some of it to boil, turning into water vapor. Since the density of water vapor is approximately 1/2000 that of liquid water, the mixture of air and water vapor in the lower vessel quickly expands as more liquid is boiled to vapor, increasing the pressure in the lower vessel.

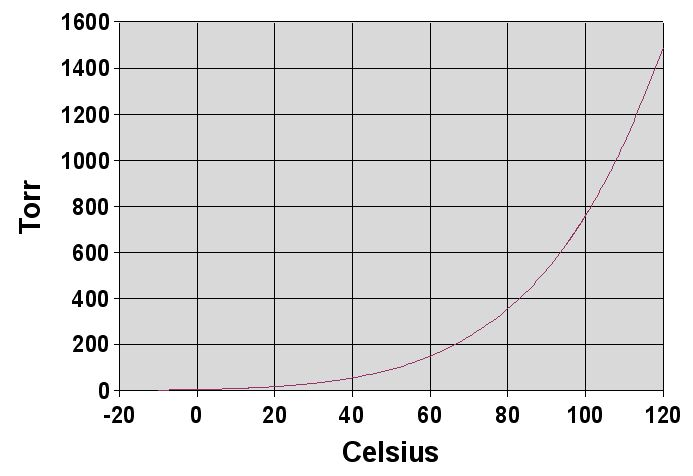
As temperature increases, the vapor pressure of water increases. At the normal boiling point of 100 °C, the vapor pressure equals the standard atmospheric pressure of 760 Torr (760 mm of mercury).

Once the pressure in the lower vessel exceeds atmospheric pressure, the remaining water is pushed up through the siphon tube (C) into the upper vessel (D), where it remains, so long as the pressure difference between the upper and lower vessels is sufficient to support it, about 1.5 kPa (0.015 atm). This pressure difference is maintained during brewing through the continuous heating of the lower vessel. Coffee grounds are added to the water in the upper chamber and coffee is brewed using the displaced water at slightly less than the boiling point, 100 °C (212 °F).

When the coffee has finished steeping, the heat is removed and the pressure in the lower vessel decreases; when the combined force of gravity and atmospheric pressure overcomes the (decreased) pressure within the lower vessel, the brewed coffee is pulled into the lower vessel of the vacuum coffee maker, leaving the coffee grounds in the upper vessel.

The moka pot coffee maker functions on the same principle but the water is forced up from the bottom chamber through the third middle chamber containing the coffee grounds to the top chamber which has an air gap to prevent the brewed coffee from returning downwards. (Additionally, because the water is forced up through packed grounds, the pressures are greater.) The prepared coffee is then poured off from the top.

Vacuum coffee maker process
Step	Image	Notes
1		Water is heated to a boil in the glass carafe.
2		Coffee grounds are prepared and placed in glass container.
3		The stem of the coffee ground container is inserted into the top of the glass carafe, sealing it, while the water continues to boil.
4		The trapped steam in the carafe forces hot water up the stem of the coffee ground container, where it mixes with the ground coffee. The mix is then stirred for one minute while the coffee brews.
5		At this point, the coffee has been fully brewed, but it is still mixed with the coffee grounds in the upper container. The glass carafe is taken off the heated surface.
6		As the glass carafe cools, the steam in the carafe condenses, which causes the pressure in the carafe to decrease. This in turn pulls the brewed coffee through the filter of the coffee ground container down into the glass carafe, separating the brewed coffee from the coffee grounds. This process also is assisted by gravity.
7		The filtered, brewed coffee is finished, and located in the glass carafe. The glass coffee ground container contains grounds, which are drier relative to filtered coffee grounds using conventional drip brewing because the siphon action also pushes air over the grounds as the brewed coffee returns to the carafe.

== See also ==
- Minto wheel
- Bodum, makers of the Santos, Pebo and ePebo vacuum coffee makers
