= Alan Adler =

American inventor

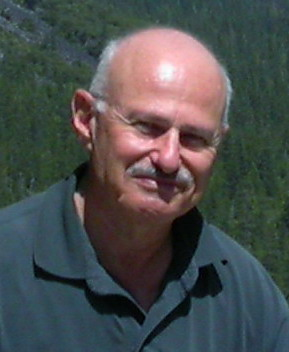
- Born: May 1938 (age 88); Detroit, Michigan
- Known for: Inventor

Alan Adler is an American inventor. His inventions include aerodynamic toys under the Aerobie brand, such as footballs with fins, flying rings and discs, as well as a manual coffee brewing device, the AeroPress. His Aerobie Pro flying ring set several world records for the farthest thrown object.

Adler has approximately 40 patents in electronics, optics, and aerodynamics. He lectures in mechanical engineering at Stanford University and has lectured at NASA, The Royal Aeronautical Society, Princeton University, California Institute of Technology, Egan Junior High School, and University of California - Davis.

He lives in California, and is the founder of AeroPress, Inc., of Palo Alto.
