= French press =

Coffee brewing device

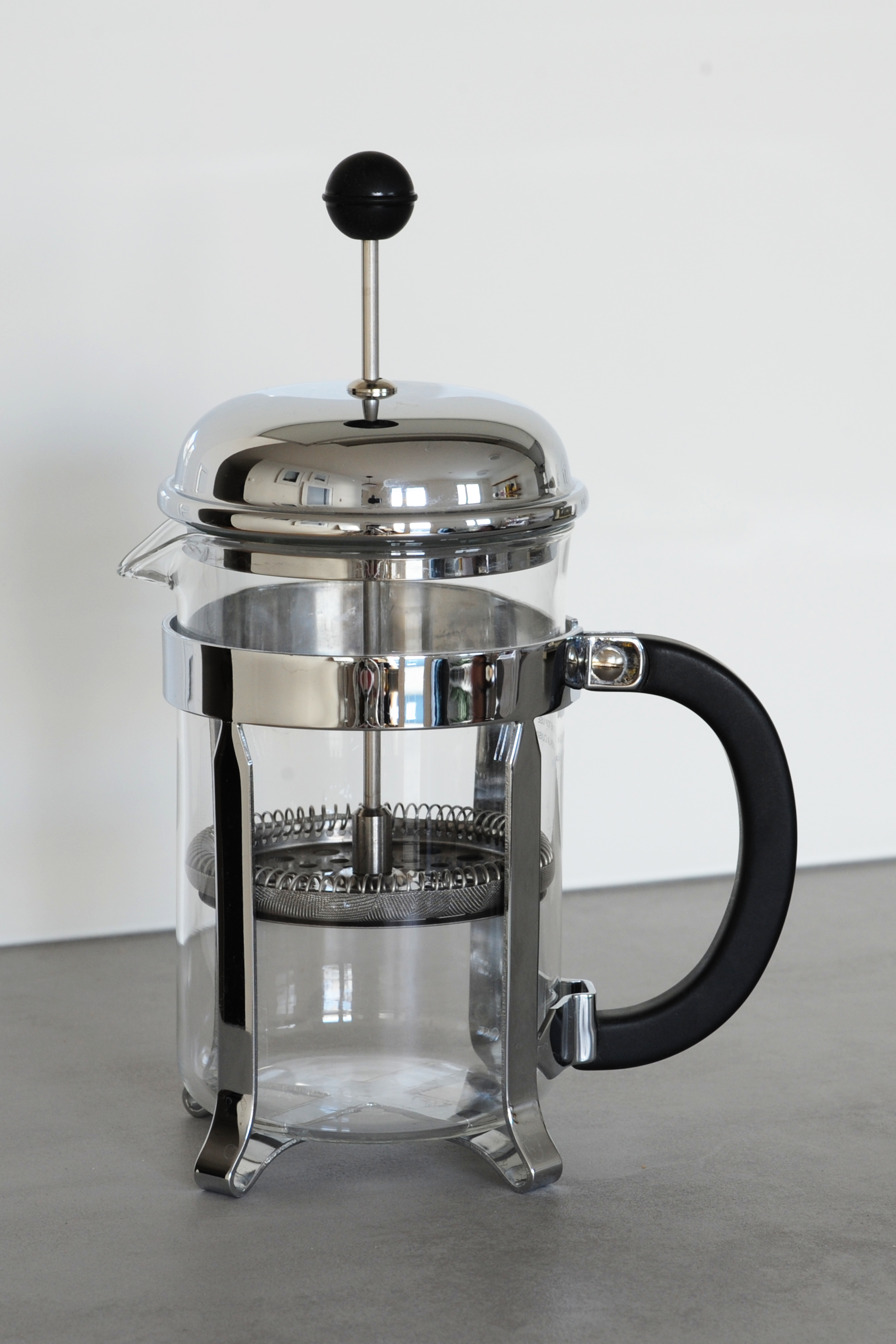
A French press

A French press, also known as a cafetière, cafetière à piston, caffettiera a stantuffo, press pot, coffee press or coffee plunger is a coffee brewing device, although it can also be used for other tasks. As a method of coffee preparation based on steeping the coffee grounds for a few minutes in hot water, the French press is a very simple device which can deliver an excellent coffee taste. Since it is compact and portable, the French press is a popular choice for camping.

In 1812, Benjamin Thompson invented a drip-press coffee brewing device In 1852, Jacques-Victor Delforge and Henri-Otto Mayer patented a device in France.

== Name ==
In English, the device is known in North America as a French press or coffee press; in Britain and Ireland as a cafetière, from the French for "coffee maker"; and in New Zealand, Australia, and South Africa as a coffee plunger (the coffee brewed in it is plunger coffee). It is known in French as a cafetière à piston or simply cafetière (also the usage in Dutch), though some speakers might also use genericized trademarks, such as Melior or Bodum. In Italian, it is known as a caffettiera a stantuffo; in German as a Pressstempelkanne, Stempelkanne ("stamp pot"), Stabfilterkanne, Kaffeepresse ("coffee press") or Bistrokanne.

== Design history ==
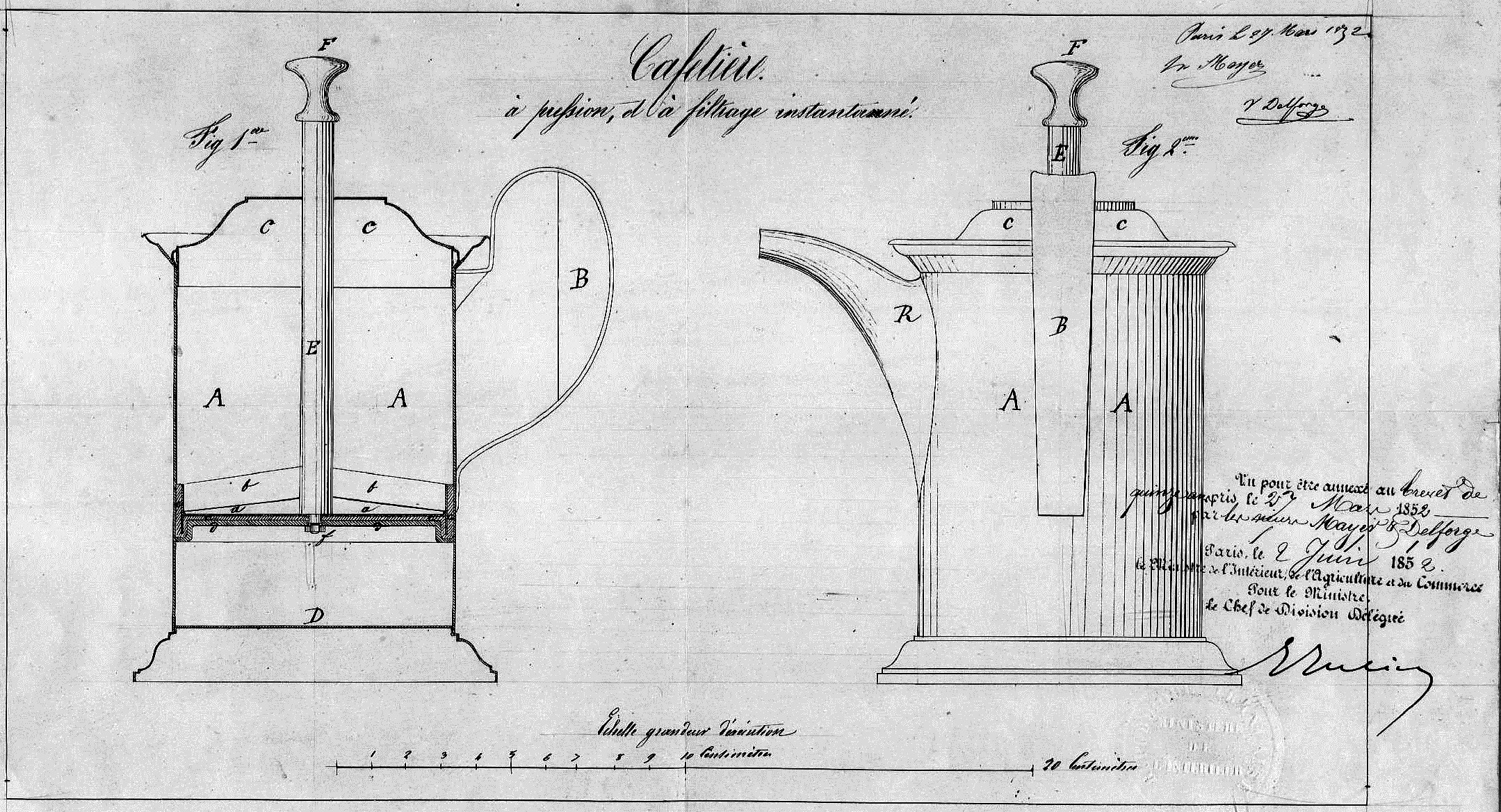
Mayer & Delforge's 1852 patent

Over the years, the French press has undergone several design modifications. The first coffee press, which may have been made in France, was the modern coffee press in its rudimentary form – a metal or cheesecloth screen fitted to a rod that users would press into a pot of hot water and coffee grounds. In 1852, two Frenchmen, a Paris metalsmith and a merchant, Henri-Otto Mayer and Jacques-Victor Delforge, patented a forerunner of the French press, that did not create a seal around the filter. A patent was filed by a Frenchman, Marcel-Pierre Paquet dit Jolbert, officially published on 5 August 1924.

In 1928, a coffee press was created by Milanese designers Giulio Moneta and Attilio Calimani which had a spring to seal the filter, and patented it in the United States in 1929. It underwent several design modifications through Faliero Bondanini, who patented his own version in 1958 and manufactured it in French clarinet factory Martin SA under the brand name Melior. (Its popularity may have been aided in 1965 by its use in the Michael Caine film The Ipcress File.) The device was litigated and further popularized throughout Europe by Melior-Martin, a French company, Household Articles Ltd. (La Cafetiere), a British company, and Bodum (Chambord), a Danish tableware and kitchenware company.

The modern French press consists of a narrow cylindrical beaker, usually made of glass or clear plastic, equipped with a metal or plastic lid and plunger that fits tightly in the cylinder and has a fine stainless steel wire or nylon mesh filter.

== Operation ==
Preparation of a cup of coffee with a French press

Coffee is brewed by placing coarsely ground coffee in the empty beaker and adding hot water, 93–96 °C (199–205 °F), in proportions of about 30 g (1 oz) of coffee grounds to 500 ml (17 US fl oz) of water, more or less to taste. After brewing, the plunger is depressed, holding down the coffee grounds while the coffee is served.

A French press works best with coffee of a coarser grind, about the consistency of cooking salt. Finer coffee grounds, when immersed in water, have lower permeability, requiring an excessive amount of force to be applied by hand to lower the plunger and are more likely to seep through or around the perimeter of the press filter and into the coffee drink. Additionally, finer grounds will tend to over-extract and cause the coffee to taste bitter.

Some writers give the optimal time for brewing as around four minutes. Other approaches, such as cold brewing, require several hours of contact between the water and the grounds to achieve the desired extraction.

Plunging slowly prevents accidental scalding of the brewer and is purported to maximize the extraction of the oils and flavonoids from the ground bean. The mesh piston normally does not compress the coffee grounds, as most designs leave a generous space – about 30 mm (1 in) – below the piston in its lowest position. If the brewed coffee is allowed to remain in the beaker with the used grounds, the coffee may become astringent and bitter, though this is an effect that some users of the French press consider desirable.

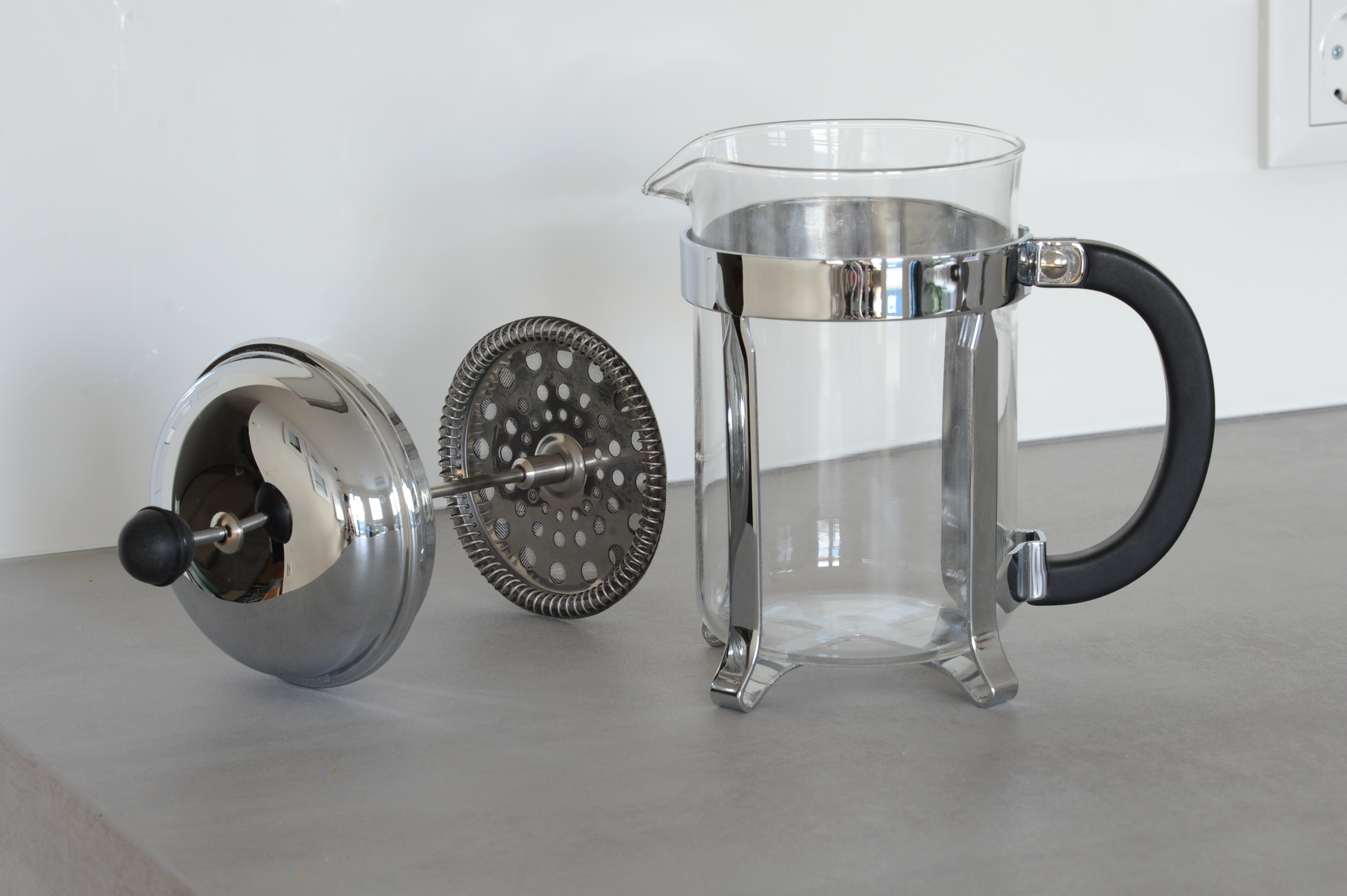
Piston separated from the beaker

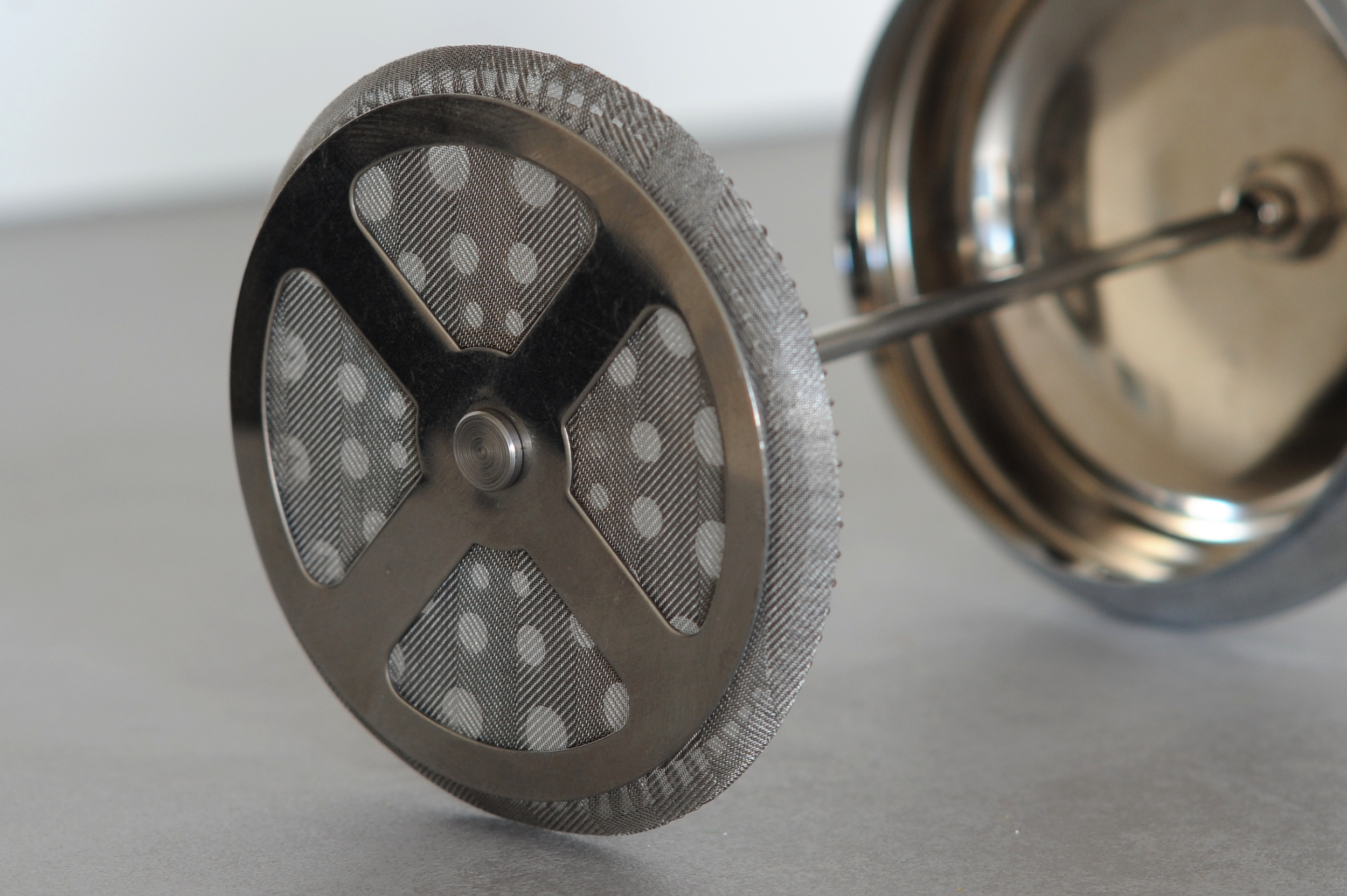
Bottom side of the mesh

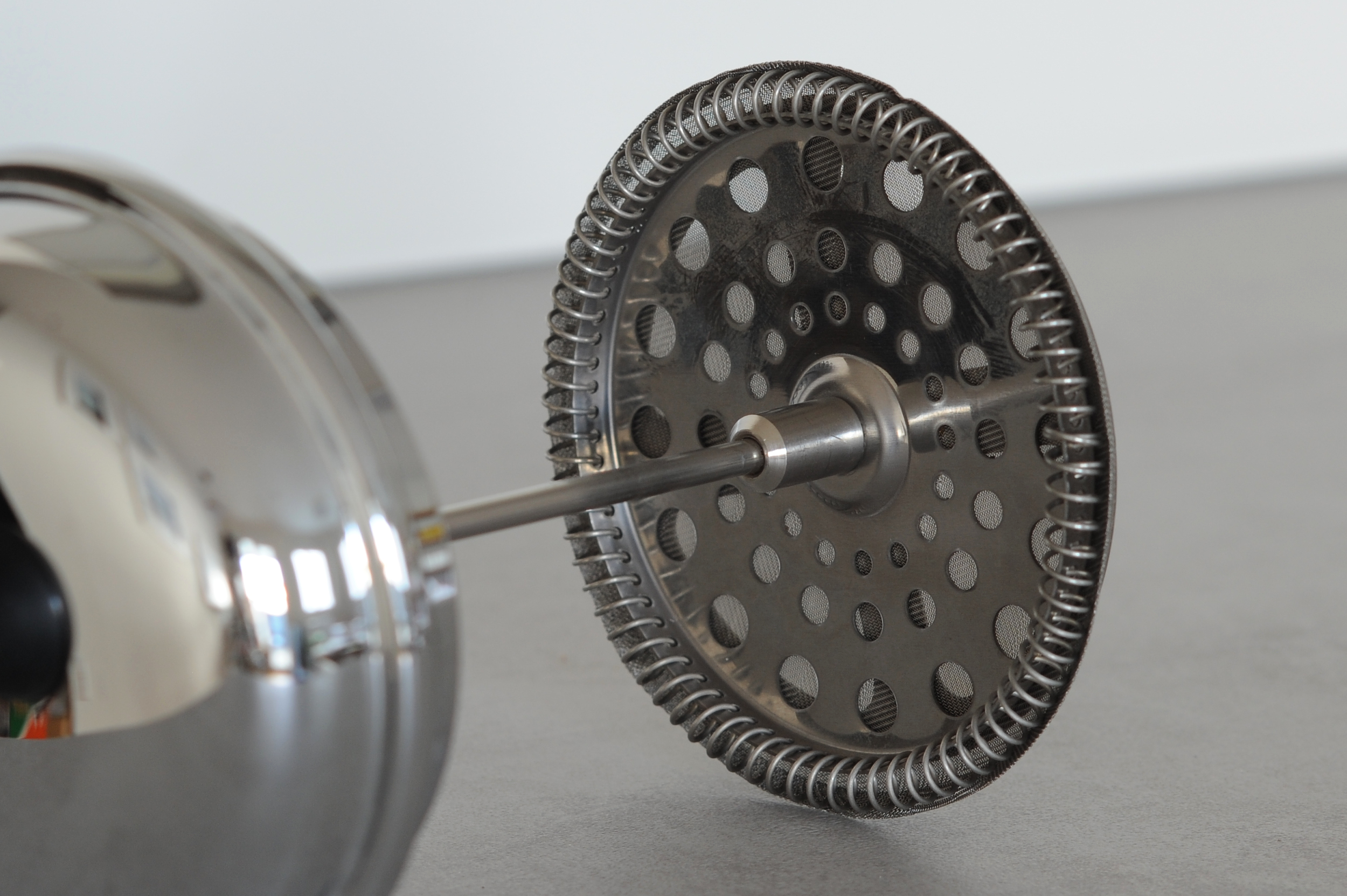
Upper side of the mesh

== Variations ==
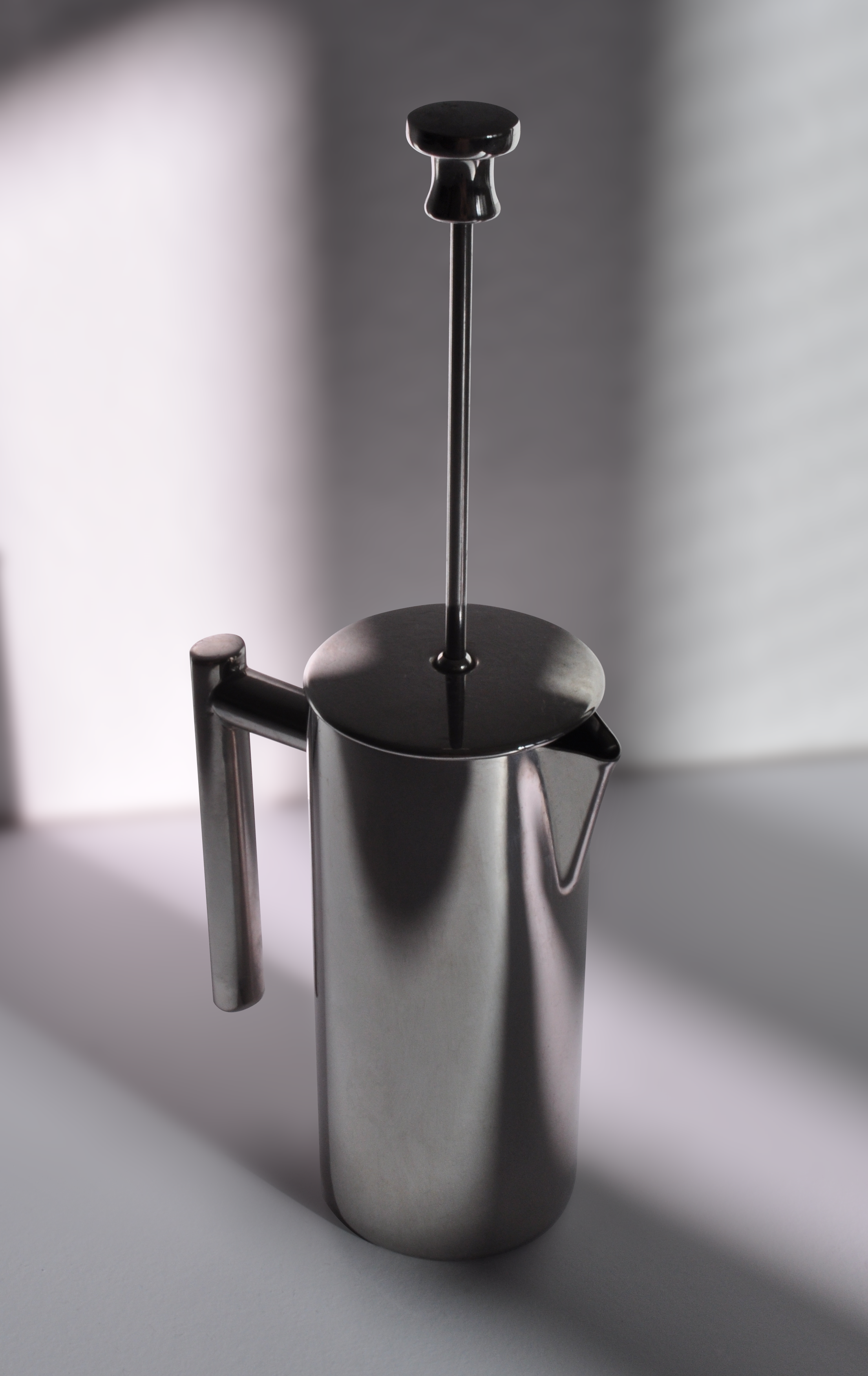
A French press made of stainless steel

French presses are more portable and self-contained than other coffee makers. Travel mug versions exist, which are made of tough plastic instead of the more common glass, and have a sealed lid with a closable drinking hole. Some versions are marketed to hikers and backpackers not wishing to carry a heavy, metal percolator or a filter using drip brew.

Other versions include stainless steel, insulated presses designed to keep the coffee hot, similar in design to thermos flasks. Coffee filters commonly used in South Indian households are a stainless steel version but without insulation. The decant known as decoction is mixed immediately with milk and sugar to make kaapi.

One variation also called "French pull" or "reverse French press" uses a pull-design: the coffee grounds are placed in a mesh basket, which is then pulled into the lid after brewing, trapping the grounds out of the coffee. Others produce a similar effect by having shutters that can be closed via the top of the press, sealing the grounds off from the coffee entirely. French presses are also sometimes used to make cold brew coffee.

Another variation using a basket to hold the coffee grounds is called "American press", where the hot water is filled in first and then the basket is slowly pushed down (and sometimes also pulled up again) through the water column.

An all-in-one French press consists of a heating element that can receive its power from a 12-volt power source.

== Other uses ==
In the same way as coffee, a French press can also be used in place of a tea infuser to brew loose tea. To some extent the tea will continue to steep even after the plunger is depressed, which may cause the tea remaining in the press to become bitter. It might thus be advisable to decant the tea into a serving vessel after preparation. The same French press should not be used for both tea and coffee unless thoroughly cleaned, as coffee residue may spoil the flavor of the tea. However, this method is more suitable for light teas and is not suitable for masala chai (which must be boiled) or Chinese tea (which tends to be diffused for a long time, with tea leaves reused as a rule).

A French press can also be used for straining broth from shellfish or other ingredients.
