= De La Galette Lake =

Freshwater body in Quebec, Canada

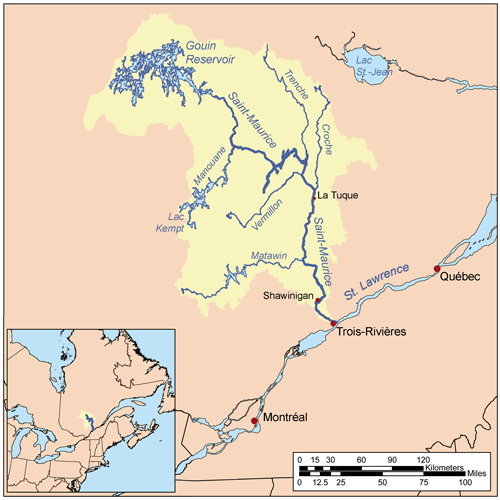
- Watershed of Saint-Maurice River

- Location within Quebec
- Location: La Tuque
- Coordinates: 48°17′25″N 74°27′27″W
- Type: Natural
- Primary inflows: (clockwise); Leblanc River (Gouin Reservoir); De La Galette River (Gouin Reservoir); outlet of lake Delage).
- Primary outflows: Gouin Reservoir.
- Basin countries: Canada
- Max. length: 7.8 kilometres (4.8 mi)
- Max. width: 2.4 kilometres (1.5 mi)
- Surface elevation: 402 metres (1,319 ft)

The Lac de la Galette (English: "De La Galette Lake") is a freshwater body of the town of La Tuque, in Haute-Mauricie, forming a bay on the south shore of Gouin Reservoir and west of the upper Saint-Maurice River, in the administrative region of Mauricie, in the province of Quebec, in Canada.

This lake is mainly located in the township of Delage, except for a bay on the east shore that receives the waters of the Leblanc River (Gouin Reservoir), which penetrates eastward into the township of Leblanc. Following the erection completed in 1948 of the Gouin dam, the "Lac de la Galette" became an extension of the Bouzanquet Bay which is an extension to the south of Gouin Reservoir.

Forestry is the main economic activity of the sector. Recreational tourism activities come second.

The route 400, connecting the Gouin Dam to the village of Parent, Quebec, serves the valleys of the De La Galette River (Gouin Reservoir) and the Leblanc River (Gouin Reservoir); this road also serves the peninsula which stretches north in the Gouin Reservoir on 30.1 kilometres (18.7 mi). Some secondary forest roads are in use nearby for forestry and recreational tourism activities.

The surface of the "De La Galette Lake" is usually frozen from mid-November to the end of April, however, safe ice circulation is generally from early December to late March.

== Geography ==
This lake has a west-facing banana-shaped length of 7.8 kilometres (4.8 mi), a maximum width of 2.4 kilometres (1.5 mi) and an elevation of 402 metres (1,319 ft), the same level as the Gouin Reservoir. The "Lac de la Galette" has a rather complex shape including a peninsula (eroded by side bays) stretching eastward on 1.7 kilometres (1.1 mi). A mountain top of 517 metres (1,696 ft) is located at 1.9 kilometres (1.2 mi) east of the tie from this peninsula to the west bank of the lake.

This body of water receives from the South-East the waters of the Leblanc River (Gouin Reservoir), the South-East waters of the De La Galette River (Gouin Reservoir) and South-West the outlet of Lake Delage.

The mouth of Lac de la Galette is located at:

- 27.8 kilometres (17.3 mi) south-west of the Gouin Dam;
- 52.1 kilometres (32.4 mi) south-east of the center of the village of Obedjiwan, Quebec;
- 68.7 kilometres (42.7 mi) northwest of the village center of Wemotaci, Quebec (north shore of the Saint-Maurice River);
- 160 kilometres (99 mi) north-west of downtown La Tuque;
- 262.6 kilometres (163.2 mi) northwest of the mouth of the Saint-Maurice River (confluence with the St. Lawrence River at Trois-Rivières).

The surrounding hydrographic slopes of "Lac de la Galette" are:

- north side: Gouin Reservoir, Bouzanquet Bay, Five Mile Lake, Brochu Lake, Kettle Bay;
- east side: Atimokateiw River, Leblanc River (Gouin Reservoir), Jean-Pierre River, Saint-Maurice River, Cypress River (La Tuque), Najoua River;
- south side: Galette River (Gouin Reservoir), Decelles Lake, Bazin River, Norah Creek, Bellerive River, Pichoui River West;
- west side: Francoeur Lake, Five Mile Lake, Gouin Reservoir (South Bay), Nemio River.
The mouth of "Lac de la Galette" corresponds to the mouth of the De LaGalette River (Gouin Reservoir) on South shore of Gouin Reservoir. From there, the current flows to the northwest on the North-West to the mouth of Bouzanquet Bay; then cross the Gouin Reservoir on 34.8 kilometres (21.6 mi) in bypassing a large peninsula from the North, crossing Brochu Lake and Kikendatch Bay to Gouin Dam. From this dam, the current flows along the Saint-Maurice River to Trois-Rivières.

== Toponymy ==
The toponym "Lac de la Galette" was formalized on December 18, 1986, by the Commission de toponymie du Québec, when it was created.

== See also ==
- Saint-Maurice River
- Gouin Reservoir, a body of water
- Bouzanquet Bay, a body of water
- De la Galette River (Gouin Reservoir), a watercourse
- Leblanc River (Gouin Reservoir), a watercourse
- La Tuque, a city
- List of lakes in Canada
