= Chapman Lake (Gouin Reservoir) =

Lake in Quebec, Canada

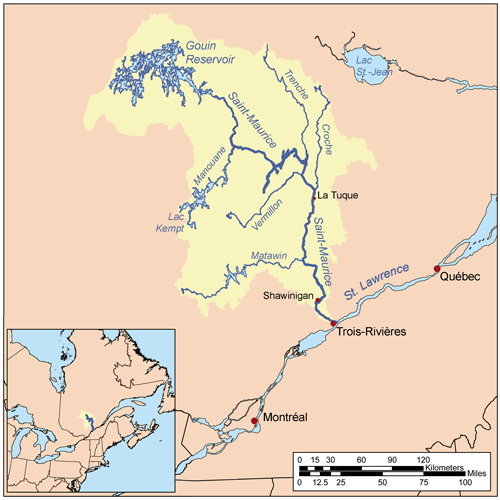
- Watershed of Saint-Maurice River

- Location within Quebec
- Location: La Tuque
- Coordinates: 48°24′01″N 74°40′39″W
- Type: Lake of dam
- Primary inflows: (clockwise); Outlet of lake Kaminitikwakamak; outlet of Lake Déboisé; outlet of lake Kaacikitaporonaniwok; Marmette Bay South.
- Primary outflows: Nevers Lake (Gouin Reservoir)
- Basin countries: Canada
- Max. length: 13.4 kilometres (8.3 mi)
- Max. width: 3.1 kilometres (1.9 mi)
- Surface elevation: 402 metres (1,319 ft)

The Chapman Lake is a vast expanse of freshwater in the central part of the Gouin Reservoir, in the territory of the town of La Tuque, in Haute-Mauricie, in the administrative region of Mauricie, in the province of Quebec, in Canada.

This bay extends into the cantons of Chapman (northern part), Huguenin (southern part) and Nevers (eastern part). Following the completion of the Gouin Dam in 1948, the current form of Chapman Lake was shaped by the raising of the Gouin Reservoir. The water level varies significantly, being dependent on the Gouin Dam.

Recreotourism activities are the main economic activity of the sector. Forestry comes second.

A road branch connecting to the South at route 400 serves the southern portion of Chapman Lake and the southwestern portion of "Lac des Cinq Milles". The route 400 connects the Gouin Dam to the village of Parent, Quebec, also serves the river valleys Jean-Pierre and Leblanc; this road also serves the peninsula which stretches north in the Gouin Reservoir on 30.1 kilometres (18.7 mi). Some secondary forest roads are in use nearby for forestry and recreational tourism activities.

The surface of Chapman Lake is usually frozen from mid-November to the end of April, but safe ice circulation is generally from early December to the end of March.

== Geography ==
The lake Chapman is primarily fed by the Kaminitikwakamak Lake Discharge, the Lac Déboisé Discharge, the Kaacikitaporonaniwok Lake Discharge, and the Strait linking it to Marmette Bay South.

This lake, with a length of 13.4 kilometres (8.3 mi), has a southern portion (length: 3.4 kilometres (2.1 mi)) that extends southward in the township of Huguenin; this southern part is delimited by a peninsula with a length of 1.6 kilometres (0.99 mi) stretching towards the North-West. The west shore of the lake includes a bay penetrating 2.1 kilometres (1.3 mi) between the mountains to the west, or up to 300 metres (980 ft) from the east shore of Marmette Bay South.

On the north side of Chapman Lake, several islands are aligned in the North-South direction between Marmette Bay South (on the west side) and Nevers Lake (on the east side); the longest of these islands stretches on 21.4 kilometres (13.3 mi) (North-South direction).

A first island with a length of 2.7 kilometres (1.7 mi) crosses the northern limit of the lake. A strait of 4.5 kilometres (2.8 mi) passing west of this island joins Marmette Bay South. Another passage of 3.5 kilometres (2.2 mi) separates the east side of this island with the west side of the northern end of a peninsula attached to the south shore of the Gouin Reservoir.

The water level of Chapman Lake is dependent on the Gouin Dam established in 1948. The confluence between the north-east passage of Chapman Lake and the west shore of Nevers Lake is located at:

- 31.1 kilometres (19.3 mi) south-east of the village center of Obedjiwan, Quebec which is located on a peninsula on the north shore of Gouin Reservoir;
- 42.5 kilometres (26.4 mi) west of Gouin Dam;
- 89.1 kilometres (55.4 mi) northwest of the village center of Wemotaci, Quebec (north shore of the Saint-Maurice River);
- 178 kilometres (111 mi) north-west of downtown La Tuque;
- 283 kilometres (176 mi) northwest of the mouth of the Saint-Maurice River (confluence with the St. Lawrence River at Trois-Rivières).

The surrounding hydrographic slopes of Chapman Lake are:

- north side: Nevers Lake, Marmette Bay South, Marmette Lake, McSweeney Lake;
- east side: Nevers Lake, Five Mile Lake, Jean-Pierre Bay (Gouin Reservoir), Atimokateiw River, Kikendatch Bay, Saint-Maurice River ];
- south side: Lac Garancières, Lac Francoeur, Lac Delâge, Decelles Lake, Bazin River, De La Galette River (Gouin Reservoir);
- West side: Lake Lepage, Nemio River, Bureau Lake.

From the confluence of the Chapman Lake and Nevers Lake (pass), the current flows over 51 kilometres (32 mi) to Gouin Dam, according to the following segments:

- to the east, bypassing the "island of the Cross", the "Island of Women" and Kaminictikotanak Island;
- to the East, bypassing by the North a large peninsula attached to the southern shore of the Gouin reservoir, then is redirected in the South-East arm of Brochu Lake;
- to the East through Kikendatch Bay until Gouin Dam.
From this dam, the current flows along the Saint-Maurice River to Trois-Rivières.

== Toponymy ==
The term "Chapman" is a family name of English origin.

The toponym "lac Chapman" was formalized on December 18, 1986, by the Commission de toponymie du Québec.

== See also ==
- Saint-Maurice River, a watercourse
- Gouin Reservoir, a body of water
- Kikendatch Bay, a body of water
- Brochu Lake, a body of water
- Jean-Pierre Bay (Gouin Reservoir), a body of water
- Nevers Lake, a body of water
- Bouzanquet Bay, a body of water
- La Tuque, a city
- List of lakes in Canada
