= Nemio River =

Nemio
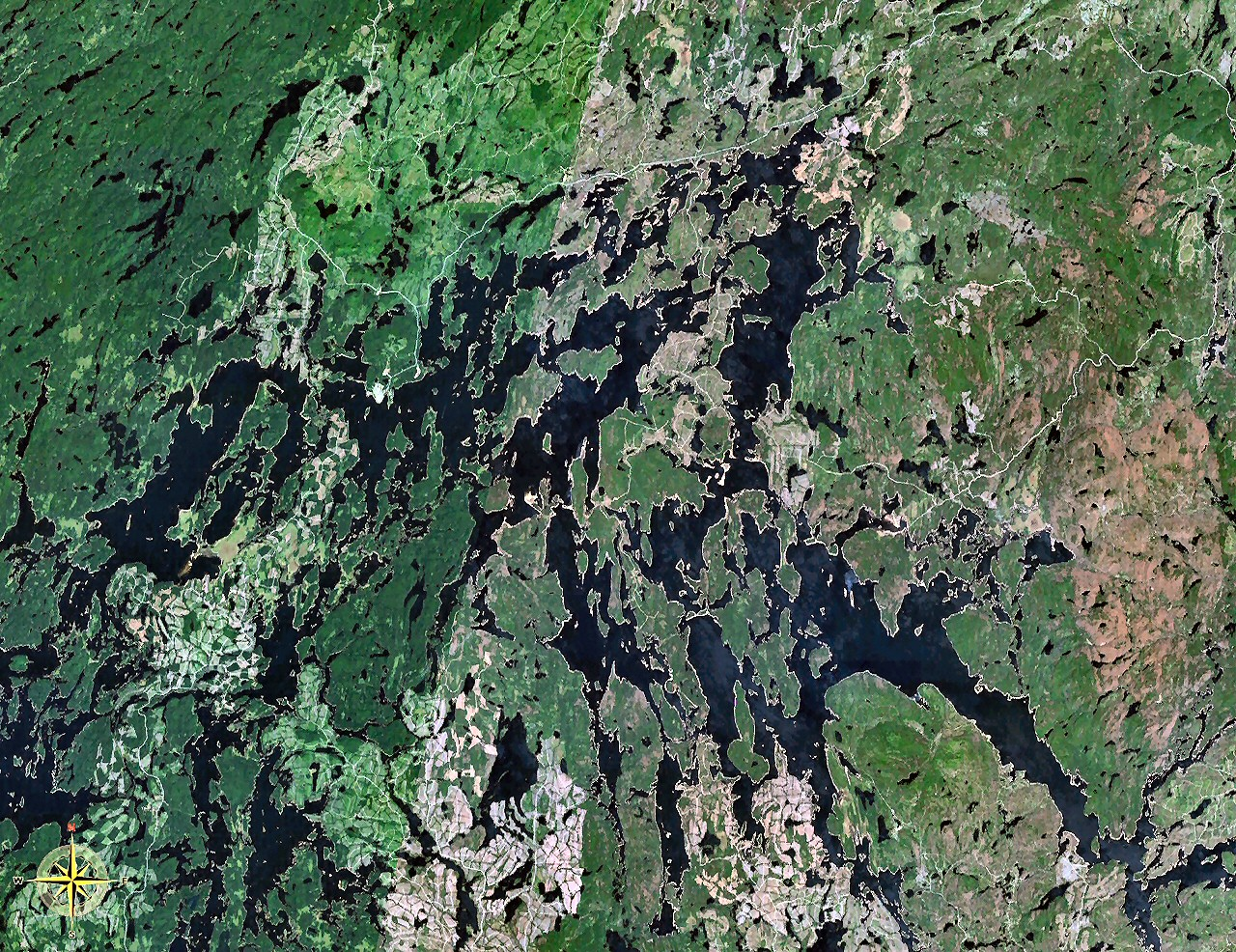
- Map of Saint-Maurice River watershed

Location
- Country: Canada
- Province: Quebec
- Region: Mauricie

Physical characteristics
- Source: Dugré Lake
  - location: La Tuque (Tassé Township), Mauricie, Quebec
  - coordinates: 48°09′41″N 74°47′43″W
  - elevation: 443 m (1,453 ft)
- Mouth: Bureau Lake
  - location: La Tuque, Mauricie, Quebec
  - coordinates: 48°30′43″N 75°00′02″W
  - elevation: 402 m (1,319 ft)
- Length: 60.2 km (37.4 mi)

The Nemio River is a tributary of the south shore of the Gouin Reservoir, flowing in the town of La Tuque, in the administrative region of Mauricie, in Quebec, Canada.

The Nemio River flows successively into the townships of Tassé, Huguenin, Sulte, Chapman, Myrand and Lemay, on the southern shore of the Gouin Reservoir. Forestry is the main economic activity of this valley; recreational tourism activities, second.

The route 404, connecting the village of Clova, Quebec to the South Bay of Bureau Lake is connected to sub-road branches which serve the upper part of the Nemio River; this road connects to the south-east route 400 which goes to Gouin Dam. Some secondary forest roads are in use nearby for forestry and recreational tourism activities.

The surface of the Nemio River is usually frozen from mid-November to the end of April, however, safe ice circulation is generally from early December to late March.

== Geography ==
The surrounding hydrographic slopes of the Nemio River are:
- North side: Du Mâle Lake (Gouin Reservoir), Toussaint Lake (Gouin Reservoir), Marmette Lake (Gouin Reservoir), McSeeney Lake, Toussaint River (Gouin Reservoir);
- East side: Lepage Lake (Wacekamiw River), Chapman Lake (Gouin Reservoir), Bouzanquet Bay, Marmette Bay South, Brochu Lake, De La Galette River (Gouin Reservoir);
- South side: Sulte Lake, Oskélanéo River, Bazin River, Douville River, Gosselin River;
- West side: Bureau Lake (Gouin Reservoir) (North Bay, East Bay and South Bay), Tessier Lake (Gouin Reservoir), Saraana Bay, Flapjack River.

The Nemio River originates at the mouth of Lac Dugré (length: 9.1 kilometres (5.7 mi) crescent-shaped, elevation: 443 metres (1,453 ft)). The mouth of this head lake is located at:

- 55.9 kilometres (34.7 mi) south-east of Obedjiwan, Quebec village center (located on a peninsula on the north shore of Gouin Reservoir);
- 40.4 kilometres (25.1 mi) south-east of the mouth of the Nemio River (confluence with Bureau Lake (Gouin Reservoir));
- 56.2 kilometres (34.9 mi) southwest of Gouin Dam at the mouth of the Gouin Reservoir (confluence with the Saint-Maurice River);
- 81.3 kilometres (50.5 mi) west of the village center of Wemotaci, Quebec which is located along the Saint-Maurice River;
- 170 kilometres (110 mi) north-west of downtown La Tuque.

From the mouth of the head lake, the Nemio River flows over 60.2 kilometres (37.4 mi) according to the following segments:

Upper part of the Nemio River (segment of 43.2 kilometres (26.8 mi))

- 2.9 kilometres (1.8 mi) north, then south-east, to the north shore of Lajoie Lake;
- 3.4 kilometres (2.1 mi) easterly bypassing a peninsula by the south crossing Lajoie Lake (length: 5.4 kilometres (3.4 mi); altitude: 428 metres (1,404 ft));
- 10.8 kilometres (6.7 mi) northwesterly in a marsh zone crossing over 7.6 kilometres (4.7 mi) the Francoeur Lake (length: 9.7 kilometres (6.0 mi); altitude: 428 metres (1,404 ft)) to its mouth;
- 6.2 kilometres (3.9 mi) first eastward, forming a hook to the North, then crossing Huguenin Lake (length: 3.8 kilometres (2.4 mi); altitude: 426 metres (1,398 ft)) on its full length, to its mouth;
- 5.9 kilometres (3.7 mi) north to the southern tip of Lake Nemio;
- 14.0 kilometres (8.7 mi) northwesterly across Lake Nemio (elevation: 405 metres (1,329 ft)) over its full length;

Lower part of the Nemio River (segment of 17 kilometres (11 mi))

- 6.7 kilometres (4.2 mi) north, then skirting a mountain (summit altitude: 473 metres (1,552 ft)) on the east side, to cross the southern part of a lake unidentified, to its mouth;
- 3.9 kilometres (2.4 mi) westerly to the discharge (from the southwest) of an unidentified lake;
- 4.6 kilometres (2.9 mi) north to the confluence of a stream (from the northeast);
- 1.8 kilometres (1.1 mi) northwesterly bypassing an island of 1.8 kilometres (1.1 mi) length that bisects the mouth of the river.

In its lower part, the Nemio River crosses Nemio Bay. The mouth of the Nemio River is located at:

- 69.4 kilometres (43.1 mi) west of Gouin Dam;
- 18.4 kilometres (11.4 mi) south of the village center of Obedjiwan, Quebec which is located on a peninsula on the north shore of Gouin Reservoir;
- 112.5 kilometres (69.9 mi) northwest of the village center of Wemotaci, Quebec (north shore of the Saint-Maurice River);
- 204 kilometres (127 mi) north-west of downtown La Tuque;
- 303 kilometres (188 mi) northwest of the mouth of the Saint-Maurice River (confluence with the St. Lawrence River at Trois-Rivières).

The mouth of the Nemio River merges with the North Bay of Bureau Lake (Gouin Reservoir). From there, the current flows over 100.8 kilometres (62.6 mi) until Gouin dam, according to the following segments:

- 8.0 kilometres (5.0 mi) north to the mouth of the Bureau Lake;
- 24.0 kilometres (14.9 mi) north passing south of Obedjiwan, Quebec village, then south-east, crossing Marmette Lake;
- 18.0 kilometres (11.2 mi) to the south crossing a large bay;
- 14.3 kilometres (8.9 mi) to the northeast, skirting a large island and crossing the Nevers Lake, then the Brochu Lake to the northern tip of a large peninsula;
- 24.1 kilometres (15.0 mi) south-east crossing the south-east arm of Brochu Lake, to the outlet of the Jean-Pierre Bay (Gouin Reservoir);
- 12.4 kilometres (7.7 mi) easterly across the Kikendatch Bay to Gouin Dam.
From this dam, the current flows along the Saint-Maurice River to Trois-Rivières.

== Toponymy ==
The toponym "Nemio River" was formalized on December 5, 1968 at the Commission de toponymie du Québec, when it was created.

== See also ==
- Saint-Maurice River
- Gouin Reservoir, a body of water
- Kikendatch Bay, a body of water
- Brochu Lake (Gouin Reservoir), a body of water
- Nevers Lake (Gouin Reservoir), a body of water
- McSweeney Lake, a body of water
- Marmette Lake (Gouin Reservoir), a body of water
- Bureau Lake (Gouin Reservoir), a body of water
- La Tuque, a city
- Haute-Mauricie, a territory corresponding to the town of the actual La Tuque
- List of rivers of Quebec
