= Bureau Lake =

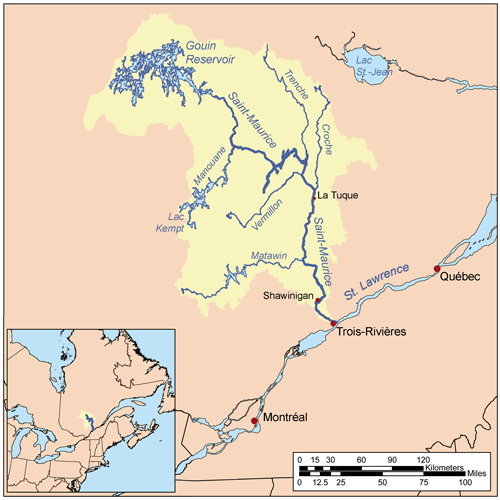
- Watershed of Saint-Maurice River

- Location within Quebec
- Location: La Tuque
- Coordinates: 48°24′16″N 74°03′03″W
- Type: Lake of dam
- Primary inflows: (clockwise); Nemio River; Minikaniciciw Creek; Mistatikamaku Creek; Oskélanéo River; outlet of lake Bravo.
- Primary outflows: Marmette Lake (Gouin Reservoir)
- Basin countries: Canada
- Max. length: 43.8 kilometres (27.2 mi)
- Max. width: 16.8 kilometres (10.4 mi)
- Surface elevation: 402 metres (1,319 ft)

The Lac Bureau is a vast freshwater body of the southwestern part of the Gouin Reservoir, in the territory of the town of La Tuque, in Haute-Mauricie, in the administrative region of Mauricie, in the province of Quebec, in Canada.

This lake extends in the cantons of Le May, Evanturel, Myrand, Achintre and Sulte. Following the erection completed in 1948 of the Gouin dam, the current shape of the "Lac Bureau" was shaped by the raising of the waters of the Gouin reservoir. The water level varies significantly, being dependent on the water management of the Gouin Dam erected in 1948.

Recreotourism activities are the main economic activity of the sector. Forestry comes second.

The route 404 serves the Oskélanéo River Valley and South Zone of South Bay of Bureau Lake. A forest road branch serves the west side of the latter bay.

The surface of Lake Bureau is usually frozen from mid-November to the end of April, however, safe ice circulation is generally from early December to the end of March.

== Geography ==
The surrounding hydrographic slopes of Lake Bureau are:
- north side: Marmette Lake, Male Lake, De La Rencontre Brook, McSweeney Lake;
- east side: Nemio River, Lepage Lake, Atikamekwranan Lake, Eriko Lake, Nevers Lake, Chapman Lake, Bouzanquet Bay, Kikendatch Bay;
- south side: Benjamin Lake, Oskélanéo River, Mistatikamekw River, Froissart Creek, Bazin River;
- west side: Saraana Bay, Mégiscane River, Tessier Lake (Gouin Reservoir).

Lake Bureau is mainly fed by the discharge of the Nemio (coming from the East) and Oskélanéo rivers (coming from the South). This lake is divided in two in the direction North-South by a peninsula (attached to the southern bank of the tank) stretching on 8.2 kilometres (5.1 mi) towards the North, being lined with an island of a length of 8.1 kilometres (5.0 mi) further north; a pass of 0.6 kilometres (0.37 mi) in length separates this island and the peninsula.

With a length of 43.8 kilometres (27.2 mi), this lake contains:

- a southerly bay (length: 12.3 kilometres (7.6 mi)) that extends southward into the townships of Achintre and Sulte; this part of the lake receives from the South the waters of the Oskélanéo River;
- a deformed eastern bay extending in the Myrand and Sulte townships eastward to the Nemio River watershed;
- a North Bay of deformed nature that collects the Nemio River (coming from the Southeast) and which extends into the townships of Myrand and Lemay.

The mouth of the lake is located on the north-east side, through an archipelago of islands separating the Bureau Lake and Marmette Lake, just south of the village of Obedjiwan, Quebec. The confluence between the Northeast Passage of Bureau Lake and the West Bank of Bureau Lake is located at:

- 10.3 kilometres (6.4 mi) South of the village center of Obedjiwan, Quebec which is located on a peninsula on the north shore of the Gouin Reservoir;
- 69.3 kilometres (43.1 mi) west of Gouin Dam;
- 115.7 kilometres (71.9 mi) northwest of the village center of Wemotaci, Quebec (north shore of the Saint-Maurice River);
- 207 kilometres (129 mi) north-west of downtown La Tuque;
- 308 kilometres (191 mi) northwest of the mouth of the Saint-Maurice River (confluence with the St. Lawrence River at Trois-Rivières).

From the outlet of the pass linking Lake Bureau and Marmette Lake, the current flows over 98 kilometres (61 mi) until Gouin dam, according to the following segments:

- to the East bypassing many islands and crossing the Marmette Lake, then the McSweeney Lake;
- to the South-East crossing the Marmette Bay South, the Nevers Lake, bypassing in particular the "Island of the Cross", the "Island of Women" and "Kaminictikotanak Island";
- towards the East, bypassing by the North a large peninsula attached to the southern shore of the Gouin Reservoir, then is redirected in the South-East arm of Brochu Lake;
- to the East to Kikendatch Bay until Gouin Dam.
From this dam, the current flows along the Saint-Maurice River to Trois-Rivières.

== Toponymy ==
A map dating from 1924 has three distinct water bodies, not connected to each other, on the site of the present Lake Bureau. The gradual raising of water, caused by the creation of the Gouin Reservoir in 1948, led to the merger of the Great South Lake and the lakes of the North and East, creating a new lake entity.

This hydronym which has been official since 1935, evokes the work of life of Joseph Bureau (1837-1914). Born in L'Ancienne-Lorette, in the suburbs of Quebec City, this explorer-cartographer has greatly contributed to pushing back the frontiers of Quebec topographic knowledge by traversing it in all directions, from Labrador at Outaouais and St. Lawrence River at Hudson Bay. His services were retained in particular in 1870 to establish the best route for the construction of a railway to the Lac Saint-Jean and Mauricie.

The following year, it goes back with John Bignell the Saint-Maurice to its source, the "lake of the Male", now integrated into Gouin reservoir.

In 1872, Bureau agreed to direct the maneuver floating logs on this river. For a long time associated with the cure Labelle for the opening of territories favorable to the colonization of the north, it is interested then with the establishment of a railway since Quebec (city) as far as the Atlantic coast, then explores a large part of the Côte-Nord. Until the end of his life, Joseph Bureau remained active. Lake Bureau also bears the name Attikamek Opiskaw Sakahikan, High Lake.

The toponym "Lac Bureau" was formalized on December 18, 1986, by the [Commission de toponymie du Quebec].

== See also ==
- Saint-Maurice River, a watercourse
- Gouin Reservoir, a body of water
- Kikendatch Bay, a body of water
- Jean-Pierre Bay (Gouin Reservoir), a body of water
- Brochu Lake, a body of water
- Nevers Lake, a body of water
- McSweeney Lake, a body of water
- Marmette Lake, a body of water
- La Tuque, a city
- List of lakes in Canada
