= Brochu Lake =

Lake in Quebec, Canada

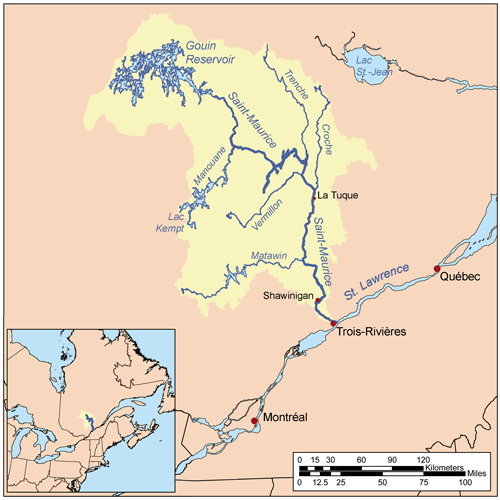
- Watershed of Saint-Maurice River

- Location within Quebec
- Location: La Tuque
- Coordinates: 48°29′56″N 74°27′40″W
- Type: Natural
- Primary inflows: (clockwise); outlet of lake Vanier; Nevers Lake; Magnan Lake; Atimokateiw River, outlet of Lake du Goéland; outlet of Little Brochu Lake; outlet of Déziel Lake (Gouin Reservoir); (where empties the Wapous River); outlet of lake Minikananik; outlet of Déserteur Lake (Gouin Reservoir); outlet of lake du Chat; outlet of Lake du Pivert; bay of Étoile Filante; bay of the Vison river.
- Primary outflows: Kikendatch Bay (current going to Gouin Dam)
- Basin countries: Canada
- Max. length: 39.7 kilometres (24.7 mi)
- Max. width: 14.4 kilometres (8.9 mi)
- Surface elevation: 402 metres (1,319 ft)

The Lake Brochu is a vast expanse of freshwater in the south-eastern part of the Gouin Reservoir, in the territory of the town of La Tuque, in the administrative region of Mauricie, in the province of Quebec, in Canada.

This lake extends into the townships of Brochu, Déziel, Nevers, Aubin and Brochu. Following the erection completed in 1948 of the Gouin Dam, the current form of "Brochu Lake" was shaped by the raising of the Gouin Reservoir.

Recreotourism activities are the main economic activity of the sector. Forestry comes second.

The route 400, connecting the Gouin Dam to the village of Parent, Quebec, serves the southern portion of Brochu Lake, as well as the river valleys Jean-Pierre and Leblanc; this road also serves the Peninsula which stretches north in the Gouin Reservoir on 30.1 kilometres (18.7 mi). Some secondary forest roads are in use nearby for forestry and recreational tourism activities.

The surface of Brochu Lake is usually frozen from mid-November to the end of April, however, safe ice circulation is generally from early December to the end of March.

== Geography ==
Lake Brochu is mainly fed in the northern part by lakes Magnan (coming from the North), Nevers (coming from the West), Lake Déziel (which comes from the East and is fed by the Wapous River) and the De La Galette River (Gouin Reservoir) via Bouzanquet Bay (coming from the South-West). In addition, Brochu Lake receives by its Southeast arm the waters of the Atimokateiw and Vison rivers.

On the North side, a group of islands separates Lake Brochu from Lake Magnan; and on the west side, another island group separates it with Lake Nevers. The Rocket Bay is located among this last group of islands.

This lake looks like a palm tree whose trunk is leaning 45 degrees to the west. This lake has a length of 39.7 kilometres (24.7 mi) with an arm of 21 kilometres (13 mi) facing south-east in the township of Aubin, until the confluence of the Jean-Pierre Bay.

The level of Brochu Lake is dependent on the Gouin Dam erected in 1948. The confluence between the South-East arm of Brochu Lake and the Jean-Pierre Bay is located in:

- 59.5 kilometres (37.0 mi) south-east of the village center of Obedjiwan which is located on a peninsula on the north shore of Gouin Reservoir;
- 15.8 kilometres (9.8 mi) south-west of Gouin Dam;
- 62.8 kilometres (39.0 mi) northwest of the village center of Wemotaci (north shore of the Saint-Maurice River);
- 152 kilometres (94 mi) north-west of downtown La Tuque;
- 259 kilometres (161 mi) northwest of the mouth of the Saint-Maurice River (confluence with the St. Lawrence River at Trois-Rivières).

The surrounding hydrographic slopes of "Brochu Lake" are:

- north side: Magnan Lake (Gouin Reservoir), McSweeney Lake, Pokotciminikew River, Wapous River;
- east side: Kikendatch Bay, Wapous River, Au Vison River, Au Vison River West;
- south side: Jean-Pierre River (Gouin Reservoir), Leblanc River (Gouin Reservoir), Atimokateiw River, Jean-Pierre Bay;
- west side: Bouzanquet Bay, Nevers Lake (Gouin Reservoir), Marmette Bay South, Kettle Bay, De La Galette River (Gouin Reservoir), Leblanc River (Gouin Reservoir).

Principal bays: Jean-Pierre Bay, Lion d'Or Bay, Wacipemakak Bay, Brochets Bay, Wacipemakak Bay, Julien Bay, Kikendatch Bay. Main islands: Women's Island, Cross Island, Kaminictikotanak Island, Trembles Island.

The current coming from the north-west of the Gouin Reservoir crosses the Brochu lake towards the South-East until the confluence of the Jean-Pierre Bay that the current crosses in its North part East to the entrance of Kikendatch Bay. From there, the current flows eastward on 12.0 kilometres (7.5 mi) to the Gouin Dam. From this dam, the current flows along the Saint-Maurice River to Trois-Rivières.

== Toponymy ==
This hydronym, which was formalized in 1935 by the Quebec Geographical Commission, evokes the work of life of Michel-Delphis Brochu (Saint-Lazare-de-Bellechasse, Quebec, 1853 - Quebec, 1933), doctor and professor at the Faculty of Medicine of Laval University. Aliéniste, Brochu acts at the beginning of the twentieth century as general director of the asylum of Beauport, establishment named afterwards "Hospital Saint-Michel-Archangel", then designated "Hospital Center Robert-Giffard" (French: Centre hospitalier Robert-Giffard) which is named today Institut universitaire en santé mentale de Québec (French). He is also known to have been the promoter of the First Congress of French-Speaking Doctors in America held in Quebec City, at Château Frontenac, in 1902, as well as the first president of the Association of French-Speaking Doctors of North America.

The toponym "Lac Brochu" was formalized on December 18, 1986, by the Commission de toponymie du Québec.

== See also ==
- Saint-Maurice River, a watercourse
- Gouin Reservoir, a body of water
- Kikendatch Bay, a body of water
- Jean-Pierre Bay (Gouin Reservoir), a body of water
- La Tuque, a city
- List of lakes in Canada
