= De La Galette River =

De La Galette
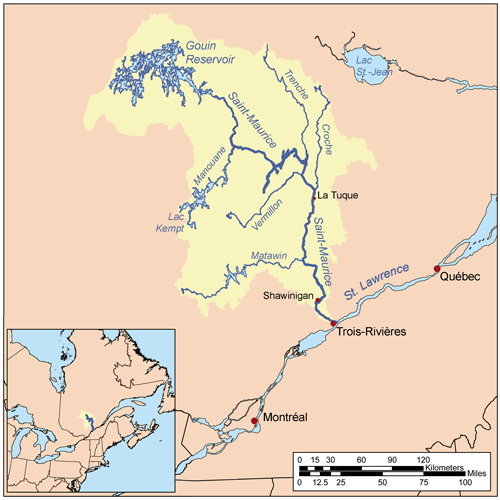
- Map of Saint-Maurice watershed.

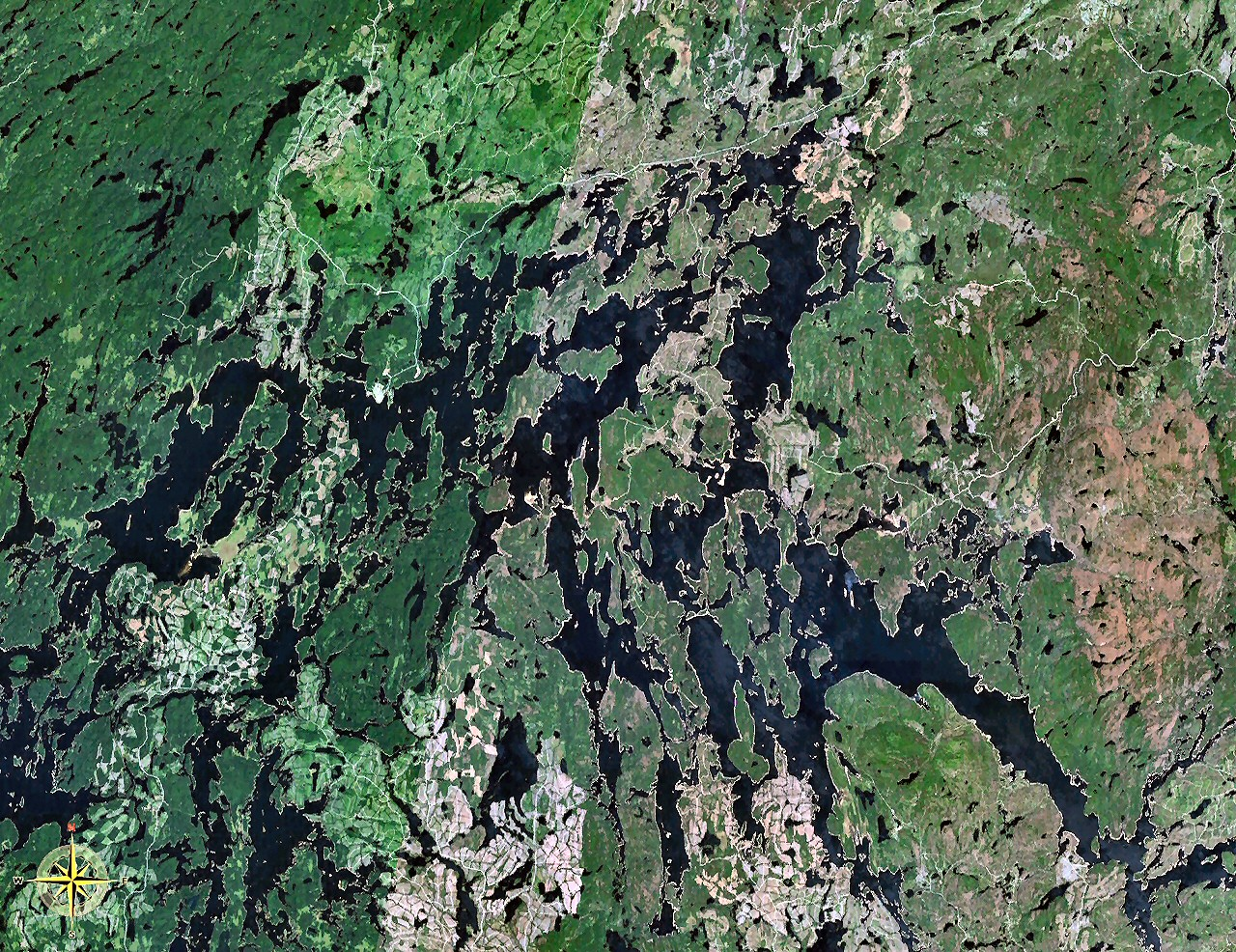
- Map of Gouin Reservoir seen from space

Location
- Country: Canada
- Province: Quebec
- Region: Mauricie

Physical characteristics
- Source: Unidentified Lake
  - location: La Tuque (canton de Fréchette), Mauricie, Quebec
  - coordinates: 48°09′51″N 74°31′05″W
  - elevation: 449 m (1,473 ft)
- Mouth: Gouin Reservoir
  - location: La Tuque, Mauricie, Quebec
  - coordinates: 48°18′58″N 74°28′00″W
  - elevation: 402 m (1,319 ft)
- Length: 34.2 km (21.3 mi)

Basin features
- Tributaries
  - left: (upstream); lake Kakickawkamak; lake Kaakwakwapiskakamak.
  - right: Leblanc River (Gouin Reservoir)

The De La Galette River (French: "Rivière de la Galette") is a tributary of the southern shore of Gouin Reservoir (Bouzanquet Bay), flowing into the territory of the town of La Tuque, in the administrative region of the Mauricie, in Quebec, in Canada.

The "River Galette" flows successively in the townships of Fréchette and Delâge, south of the Gouin reservoir and the west side of the upper Saint-Maurice River. Forestry is the main economic activity of this valley; recreational tourism activities, second.

The route 400, connecting the Gouin Dam to the village of Parent, Quebec, serves the valley of "De La Galette River" bypassing the north-west Louis-Georges-Morin (altitude: 535 metres (1,755 ft)); this road also serves the peninsula which stretches north in the Gouin Reservoir on 30.1 kilometres (18.7 mi). Some secondary forest roads are in use nearby for forestry and recreational tourism activities.

The surface of the "De La Galette River" is usually frozen from mid-November to the end of April, however, safe ice circulation is generally from early December to late March.

== Geography ==
The hydrographic slopes adjacent to the "Galette River" are:
- north side: Gouin Reservoir, Bouzanquet Bay, Five Mile Lake, Brochu Lake, Kettle Bay;
- east side: Atimokateiw River, Leblanc River (Gouin Reservoir), Jean-Pierre River, Saint-Maurice River, Cypress River (La Tuque), Najoua River;
- south side: Decelles Lake, Bazin River, Norah Creek, Bellerive River, West Pichoui River;
- west side: Francoeur Lake, Five Mile Lake, Gouin Reservoir (South Bay), Nemio River.

The "Galette River" originates at the mouth of the unidentified lake (length: 2.2 kilometres (1.4 mi) altitude: 449 metres (1,473 ft)). The mouth of this head lake is located at:

- 7.2 kilometres (4.5 mi) south-east of the confluence of the "De La Galette River" and Delâge Lake;
- 17.2 kilometres (10.7 mi) south of the mouth of the "Galette River" (confluence with the Bouzanquet Bay of the Gouin Reservoir);
- 37.6 kilometres (23.4 mi) south-west of the dam at the mouth of the Gouin Reservoir (confluence with the Saint-Maurice River);
- 62.7 kilometres (39.0 mi) west of the village center of Wemotaci, Quebec which is located along the Saint-Maurice River;
- 153.3 kilometres (95.3 mi) north-west of downtown La Tuque.

From the mouth of the head lake, the course of the "Galette River" flows over 34.2 kilometres (21.3 mi) according to the following segments:

- 5.3 kilometres (3.3 mi) southwesterly crossing an unidentified lake (length: 3.3 kilometres (2.1 mi); altitude: 436 metres (1,430 ft)) on 2.4 kilometres (1.5 mi) to its mouth;
- 6.6 kilometres (4.1 mi) northward from the west side of a mountain to the southern limit of Delâge Township;
- 6.5 kilometres (4.0 mi) north, east, then north in Delâge Township to the south shore of the southwestern part of Lac Delâge;
- 8.0 kilometres (5.0 mi) north-east across Lake Delâge (length: 8.1 kilometres (5.0 mi); altitude: 402 metres (1,319 ft)), up to mouth;
- 7.8 kilometres (4.8 mi) north across De La Galette Lake (Gouin Reservoir) (elevation: 402 metres (1,319 ft)) to its full length, to its mouth.

The mouth of the "Galette River" is located at:

- 27.8 kilometres (17.3 mi) south-west of the Gouin dam;
- 52.1 kilometres (32.4 mi) south-east of the village center of Obedjiwan, Quebec which is located on a peninsula on the north shore of Gouin Reservoir;
- 68.7 kilometres (42.7 mi) northwest of the village center of Wemotaci, Quebec (north shore of the Saint-Maurice River);
- 160 kilometres (99 mi) north-west of downtown La Tuque;
- 262.6 kilometres (163.2 mi) northwest of the mouth of the Saint-Maurice River (confluence with the St. Lawrence River at Trois-Rivières).
The mouth of "Lac de la Galette" corresponds to the mouth of the De La Galette River (Gouin Reservoir), ie on the south shore of the Gouin Reservoir. From there, the current flows northwest on 9.5 kilometres (5.9 mi) northwesterly to the mouth of the Bouzanquet Bay; then cross the Gouin Reservoir on 34.8 kilometres (21.6 mi) bypassing a large peninsula by the North, crossing Brochu Lake and Kikendatch Bay until Gouin Dam. From this dam, the current flows along the Saint-Maurice River to Trois-Rivières.

== Toponymy ==
This toponym was probably used in the late nineteenth century, thanks to the rush to logging in Haute-Mauricie which began around the middle of this century.

In 1906, the team of the surveyor of Courval made an exploration expedition of the territory up the river of Galette. This tributary of the Saint-Maurice River had a length of more than 55 kilometres (34 mi). Following the erection of the Loutre Dam in 1918, the rising waters in the Gouin Reservoir reduced the initial length of the watercourse; then the erection of the Gouin dam in 1948 reduced its length to about 15 km. A line of relief reminiscent of the shape of a slab is probably the origin of this name and other places bearing this name.

In the past, in French Canada, the term "galette" meant a kind of flat biscuit or crepe cooked in the pan. The patties recipes are usually made from oatmeal, wheat, corn or buckwheat, mixed with molasses, oatmeal, maple syrup, chocolate...

French Canadian names have retained this name since the first century of the French regime. In New France, a document of 1673 mentions "La Galette rapids", a trading post called "La Galette" and a place called "La Galette [...] below Fort de Chambly". In the twenty-first century, Québec toponymy has a dozen or so entities called "Galette", mostly lakes.

The toponym "De la Galette River" was formalized on December 5, 1968 at the Commission de toponymie du Québec.

== See also ==
- Saint-Maurice River
- Gouin Reservoir, a body of water
- Kikendatch Bay
- Brochu Lake
- De La Galette Lake (Gouin Reservoir)
- Leblanc River (Gouin Reservoir)
- LaTuque, a city
- Haute-Mauricie, a territory corresponding to the town of La Tuque
- List of rivers of Quebec
