= Bouzanquet Bay =

Bouzanquet Lake
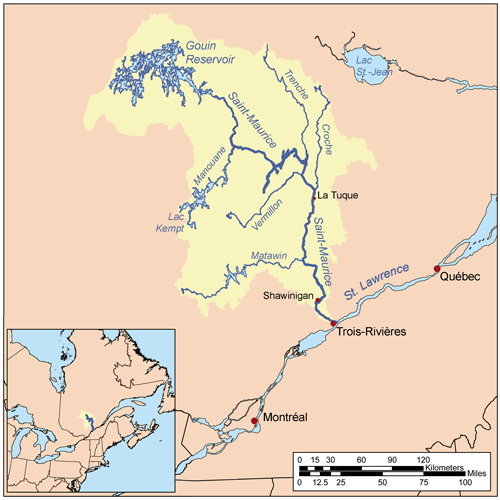
- Watershed of Saint-Maurice River

- Location within Quebec
- Location: La Tuque
- Coordinates: 48°20′46″N 74°28′28″W
- Type: Natural
- Primary inflows: (clockwise); Leblanc River (Gouin Reservoir); outlet of Lake Delage; outlet of "Lac des Cinq Milles ».
- Primary outflows: Brochu Lake (Gouin Reservoir)
- Basin countries: Canada
- Max. length: 15.8 kilometres (9.8 mi)
- Max. width: 3.8 kilometres (2.4 mi)
- Surface elevation: 402 metres (1,319 ft)

The Bouzanquet Bay is a vast freshwater body of the south-eastern part of the Gouin Reservoir, in the territory of the town of La Tuque, in Haute-Mauricie, in the administrative region of Mauricie, in the province of Quebec, in Canada.

This bay extends into the cantons of Nevers (northern part), Delage (southern part) and Leblanc (eastern part). Following the erection completed in 1948 of the dam Gouin, the current form of "Baie Bouzanquet" was shaped by the raising of the waters of Gouin reservoir.

Recreotourism activities are the main economic activity of the sector. Forestry comes second.

The route 400, connecting the Gouin Dam to the village of Parent, Quebec, serves the southern part of Bouzanquet Bay, as well as the river valleys Jean-Pierre and Leblanc; this road also serves the peninsula which stretches north in the Gouin reservoir on 30.1 kilometres (18.7 mi). Some secondary forest roads are in use nearby for forestry and recreational tourism activities.

The surface of Baie Bouzanquet is usually frozen from mid-November to the end of April, however, safe ice circulation is generally from early December to the end of March.

== Geography ==
Bouzanquet Bay is mainly fed by the Leblanc River (Gouin Reservoir), the De La Galette River (Gouin Reservoir), the Delâge Lake and the Lac des Cinq Milles.

With a length of 15.8 kilometres (9.8 mi), this bay looks like a banana open to the west. The current of the De La Galette River crosses De La Galette River over 7.8 kilometres (4.8 mi) towards the North-East to its mouth; then the current continues on 8.0 kilometres (5.0 mi) northwesterly to the mouth of the bay.

On the north side, the "Bouzanquet Pass" (length: 0.7 kilometres (0.43 mi)) separates this bay with the Southwest arm of Brochu Lake.

The water level of Bouzanquet Bay is dependent on the Gouin Dam erected in 1948. The confluence between the southwest arm of Brochu Lake and Bouzanquet Bay is located at:

- 44.6 kilometres (27.7 mi) south-east of the village center of Obedjiwan, Quebec which is located on a peninsula on the north shore of the Gouin Reservoir;
- 31.0 kilometres (19.3 mi) south-west of Gouin Dam;
- 76.1 kilometres (47.3 mi) northwest of the village center of Wemotaci, Quebec (north shore of the Saint-Maurice River);
- 165 kilometres (103 mi) north-west of downtown La Tuque;
- 270 kilometres (170 mi) northwest of the mouth of the Saint-Maurice River (confluence with the St. Lawrence River at Trois-Rivières).

The surrounding hydrographic slopes of Baie Bouzanquet are:

- north side: Brochu Lake, Nevers Lake, McSweeney Lake;
- east side: Jean-Pierre River (Gouin Reservoir), Jean-Pierre Bay (Gouin Reservoir), Atimokateiw River, Kikendatch Bay, Saint-Maurice River;
- south side: Leblanc River (Gouin Reservoir), Decelles Lake, Bazin River, De La Galette River (Gouin Reservoir);
- west side: Five Mile Lake, Chapman Lake, Bureau Lake, Marmette Bay South.

Main islands of Bouzanquet Bay: Main Island, Boar Island.

From the "Bouzanquet Pass", the current flows across the Gouin Reservoir on 34.8 kilometres (21.6 mi), including:

- crossing the Southwest Branch of Brochu Lake to the north;
- bypassing a large peninsula by the North, to be redirected towards the East by Brochu Lake, then the South-East;
- crossing east to Kikendatch Bay until Gouin Dam.
From this dam, the current flows along the Saint-Maurice River to Trois-Rivières.

== Toponymy ==
This toponym evokes the work of life of Gaston Bouzanquet, officer of the Legion of Honor and corresponding member of the Society of Geography of Quebec. Bouzanquet published in the Bulletin of the latter (volume 22, numbers 1 and 2, 1928), a text dedicated to the history of New France and to Monsieur de Montcalm in particular. Bouzanquet served as delegate of the committee of Vauvert at the inauguration of the monument of Montcalm, in 1911, in Quebec City.

The toponym "Baie Bouzanquet" was formalized on December 5, 1968, by the Commission de toponymie du Quebec, i.e. at its creation.

== See also ==
- Saint-Maurice River, a watercourse
- Gouin Reservoir, a body of water
- Kikendatch Bay, a body of water
- Jean-Pierre Bay (Gouin Reservoir), a body of water
- Brochu Lake, a waterbody
- De La Galette River (Gouin Reservoir), a watercourse
- Leblanc River (Gouin Reservoir), a watercourse
- La Tuque, in city
- List of lakes in Canada
