= Wapous River =

Wapous
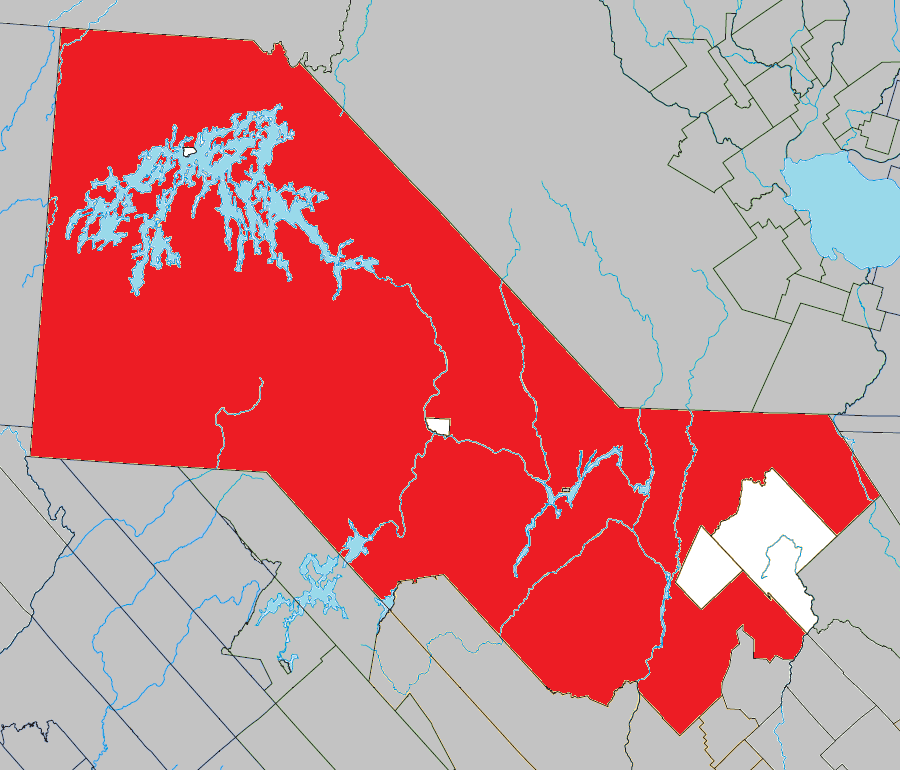
- Location of Gouin Reservoir in Haute-Mauricie

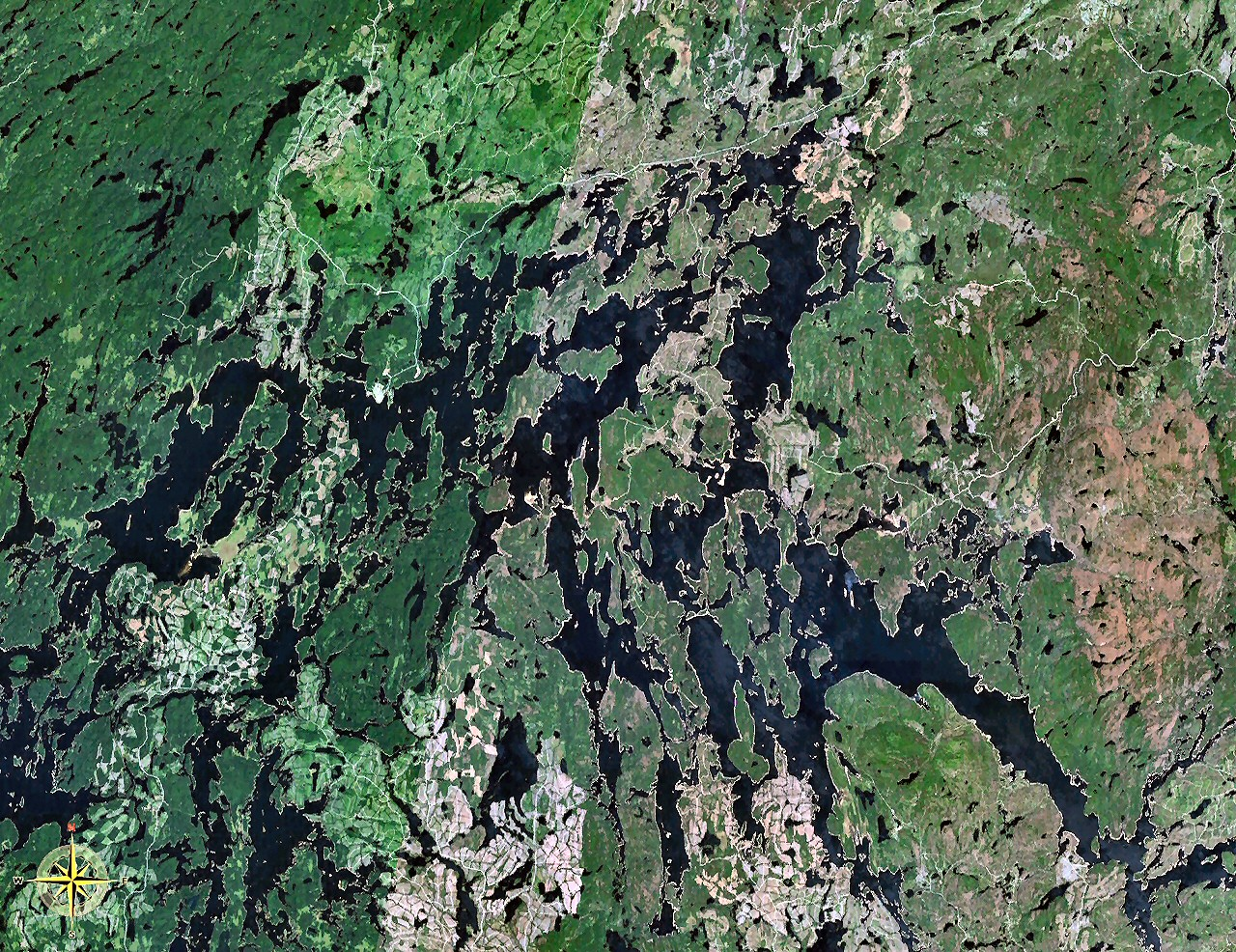
- Map of Gouin Reservoir seen from space

Location
- Country: Canada
- Province: Quebec
- Region: Mauricie

Physical characteristics
- Source: Unidentified Lake
  - location: La Tuque, Mauricie, Quebec
  - coordinates: 48°45′12″N 74°15′21″W
  - elevation: 526 m (1,726 ft)
- Mouth: Gouin Reservoir (lac Déziel)
  - location: La Tuque, Mauricie, Quebec
  - coordinates: 48°34′55″N 74°22′15″W
  - elevation: 402 m (1,319 ft)
- Length: 31.6 km (19.6 mi)

Basin features
- Tributaries
  - left: (upstream); outlet of lakes du Rat and aux Oignons; Little Creek.
  - right: (upstream); outlet of lake René; outlet of Lake de la Loupe.

The Wapous River is a tributary of the Gouin Reservoir, flowing in the territory of the town of La Tuque, in the administrative region of Mauricie, in Quebec, in Canada.

The Wapous River flows in the townships of Lindsay, Berlinguet, and Déziel, almost at the north-eastern limit of the territory of La Tuque and near the boundary of the administrative region of Saguenay-Lac-Saint-Jean. Forestry is the main economic activity of this valley; recreational tourism activities, second.

A forest road branch serves the upper part of this watercourse. This road branch connects with route 212 which bypasses the Gouin Reservoir by the north-east and connects the village of Obedjiwan, Quebec and La Tuque.

The surface of the Wapous River is usually frozen from mid-November to the end of April, however, safe ice circulation is generally from early December to late March.

== Geography ==
The adjacent hydrographic slopes of the Wapous River are:
- north side: Oskatcickic Creek, Townsend Creek, Normandin River, Normandin Lake (Normandin River), Buade Lake (Normandin River);
- east side: Berlinguet Lake, Berlinguet Creek, Little Creek, Du Loup River (Ashuapmushuan Lake), Trenche River South;
- south side: Atimokateiw River, Leblanc River (Gouin Reservoir), Gouin Reservoir (Aux Brochets Bay), Jean-Pierre River (Gouin Reservoir), Déziel Lake;
- west side: Gouin Reservoir, Magnan Lake, McSweeney Lake.

The Wapous River originates at the mouth of an unidentified lake (length: 0.4 kilometres (0.25 mi) altitude: 526 metres (1,726 ft)). The mouth of this head lake is located at:

- 20.9 kilometres (13.0 mi) north-east of the mouth of the Wapous River (confluence with the Gouin Reservoir);
- 46.1 kilometres (28.6 mi) northwest of the dam at the mouth of the Gouin Reservoir (confluence with the Saint-Maurice River);
- 51.8 kilometres (32.2 mi) north-east of the village center of Obedjiwan, Quebec (located on a peninsula on the north shore of Gouin Reservoir);
- 181.5 kilometres (112.8 mi) north-west of downtown La Tuque.

From the mouth of the head lake, the course of the Wapous River flows over 31.6 kilometres (19.6 mi) according to the following segments:

- 2.2 kilometres (1.4 mi) south through Trap Lake (elevation: 513 metres (1,683 ft)) to its mouth;
- 5.9 kilometres (3.7 mi) to the south in particular crossing the Cold Lake (length: 1.0 kilometre (0.62 mi); altitude: 490 metres (1,610 ft)) on its full length and the “Lake De La Loupe” (length: 1.4 kilometres (0.87 mi); altitude: 477 metres (1,565 ft)) on the South-East, to its mouth. The “Lake De La Loupe” straddles the townships of Lindsay and Berlinguet;
- 2.4 kilometres (1.5 mi) south-east in Berlinguet Township, crossing Lake First (length: 1.4 kilometres (0.87 mi); altitude: 467 metres (1,532 ft)) on 1.4 kilometres (0.87 mi) to its mouth;
- 1.3 kilometres (0.81 mi) towards the Ust, to the eastern limit of the township of Linsay;
- 12.0 kilometres (7.5 mi) southwesterly to the northern limit of the township of Déziel;
- 7.8 kilometres (4.8 mi) southerly in the County of Déziel forming a large S at the end of the segment to its mouth.

The confluence of the "Wapous River" with the Normandin River is located at:

- 5.0 kilometres (3.1 mi) north of the mouth of Lake Déziel;
- 34.9 kilometres (21.7 mi) northwest of the Gouin Reservoir dam (head of the Saint-Maurice River);
- 87.2 kilometres (54.2 mi) northwest of the village center of Wemotaci;
- 174.2 kilometres (108.2 mi) north-west of downtown La Tuque;
- 283.7 kilometres (176.3 mi) northwest of the mouth of the Saint-Maurice River (confluence with the St. Lawrence River at Trois-Rivières).
The Wapous River flows on the eastern shore of Déziel Lake, which is an extension to the east of the Gouin Reservoir. From the confluence of the Wapous River with Lake Déziel, the current flows generally southward Gouin Reservoir: 5.4 kilometres (3.4 mi) while crossing the Déziel Lake mouth; 38.8 kilometres (24.1 mi) to the south via the bay Kikendatch until Gouin Dam in Levasseur Township.

== Toponymy ==
Formerly, this watercourse has been designated "Black Castor River".

The toponym "Wapous River" was formalized on December 5, 1968 at the Commission de toponymie du Québec, when it was created.

== See also ==
- Saint-Maurice River
- Gouin Reservoir, a body of water
- La Tuque, Quebec, a city
- Haute-Mauricie, a territory corresponding to the town of La Tuque
- List of rivers of Quebec
