= Jean-Pierre Bay =

Bay in Gouin Reservoir, Quebec, Canada

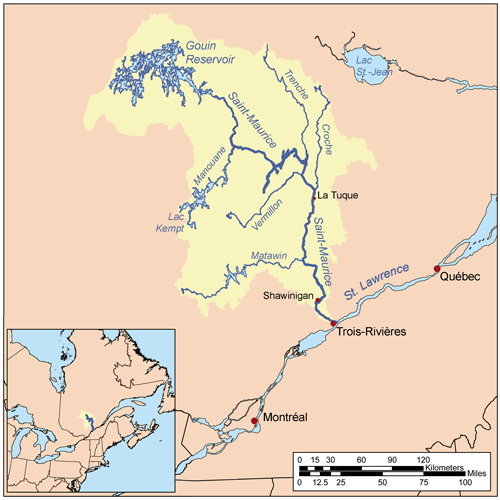
- Watershed of Saint-Maurice River

- Location within Quebec
- Location: La Tuque
- Coordinates: 48°20′06″N 74°14′55″W
- Type: Natural
- Primary inflows: Jean-Pierre River (Gouin Reservoir), Gouin Reservoir
- Primary outflows: Gouin Reservoir
- Basin countries: Canada
- Max. length: 13.9 kilometres (8.6 mi)
- Max. width: 2.5 kilometres (1.6 mi)
- Surface elevation: 402 metres (1,319 ft)

The Jean-Pierre Bay is a freshwater body of the south-eastern part of the Gouin Reservoir, in the territory of the town of La Tuque, in Haute-Mauricie, in the administrative region of Mauricie, in the province of Quebec, in Canada.

This bay is mainly included in the township of Leblanc and Aubin. Following the erection completed in 1948 of the Gouin Dam, the "Jean-Pierre Bay" was formed by the raising of the waters of the Jean-Pierre River (Gouin Reservoir). Since 1948, Jean-Pierre Bay has been an extension of the Brochu Lake further north-west, at the extreme east of the Gouin Reservoir.

Recreotourism activities are the main economic activity of the sector. Forestry comes second. A civilian seaplane base is located at the top of the Gouin Dam.

The route 400, connecting the Gouin Dam to the village of Parent, Quebec, serves the southern part of Jean-Pierre Bay, as well as the river valleys Jean-Pierre and Leblanc; this road also serves the peninsula which stretches north in the Gouin Reservoir on 30.1 kilometres (18.7 mi). Some secondary forest roads are in use nearby for forestry and recreational tourism activities.

The surface of Jean-Pierre Bay is usually frozen from mid-November to the end of April, however, safe ice circulation is generally from early December to the end of March.

== Geography ==
This bay has a length of 13.9 kilometres (8.6 mi) in the North-South direction, resembling a long carrot pointing south. It collects on the east side the waters of the Jean-Pierre River (Gouin Reservoir). This bay is bordered on the west side by a series of mountains.

Jean-Pierre Bay is formed by the Gouin dam. The confluence between Kikendatch Bay and Jean-Pierre Bay is located at:

- 68.5 kilometres (42.6 mi) south-east of the village center of Obedjiwan which is located on a peninsula on the north shore of the Gouin Reservoir;
- 52.5 kilometres (32.6 mi) northwest of the village center of Wemotaci (north shore of the Saint-Maurice River);
- 143.8 kilometres (89.4 mi) north-west of downtown La Tuque;
- 246.6 kilometres (153.2 mi) northwest of the mouth of the Saint-Maurice River (confluence with the St. Lawrence River) in Trois-Rivières).

The hydrographic slopes near Jean-Pierre Bay are:

- north side: Gouin Reservoir, Kikendatch Bay, Brochu Lake, Mink River;
- east side: Kikendatch Bay, Saint-Maurice River, Cypress River (La Tuque);
- south side: Jean-Pierre River (Gouin Reservoir), Peter Lake, Ellwood Lake, Huot River;
- west side: Bouzanquet Bay, Five Mile Lake, Gouin Reservoir, De La Galette River (Gouin Reservoir), Leblanc River (Gouin Reservoir).
The current coming from the north-west, from Brochu Lake, joins the northern part of Jean-Pierre Bay. While the current from the Jean-Pierre River (Gouin Reservoir) crosses North Bay Jean-Pierre on 7.5 kilometres (4.7 mi) to the entrance of Kikendatch Bay. From there, the current flows eastward on 12.0 kilometres (7.5 mi) to the Gouin Dam. From this dam, the current flows along the Saint-Maurice River to Trois-Rivières.

== Toponymy ==
This hydronym is a name of French origin.

The toponym "Baie Jean-Pierre" was officialized on August 2, 1991 by the Commission de toponymie du Québec.

== See also ==
- Saint-Maurice River, a watercourse
- Gouin Reservoir, a body of water
- Jean-Pierre River (Gouin Reservoir), a watercourse
- Brochu Lake, a body of water
- La Tuque, a city
- List of lakes in Canada
