= Lac-Pénobscot =

- Location within Quebec
- Location: Quebec, Canada
- Coordinates: 47.5936°N 74.8757°W

Lac-Pénobscot is a body of water in the Canadian Shield region of Quebec, about 40 kilometres (25 mi) southwest of Parent. The natural vegetation around it is boreal forest dominated by balsam fir and white birch, but some elements of the Great Lakes-St. Lawrence forest zone, most prominently red maple and sugar maple, are also present.
