= Gouin Reservoir =

Reservoir in Quebec, Canada

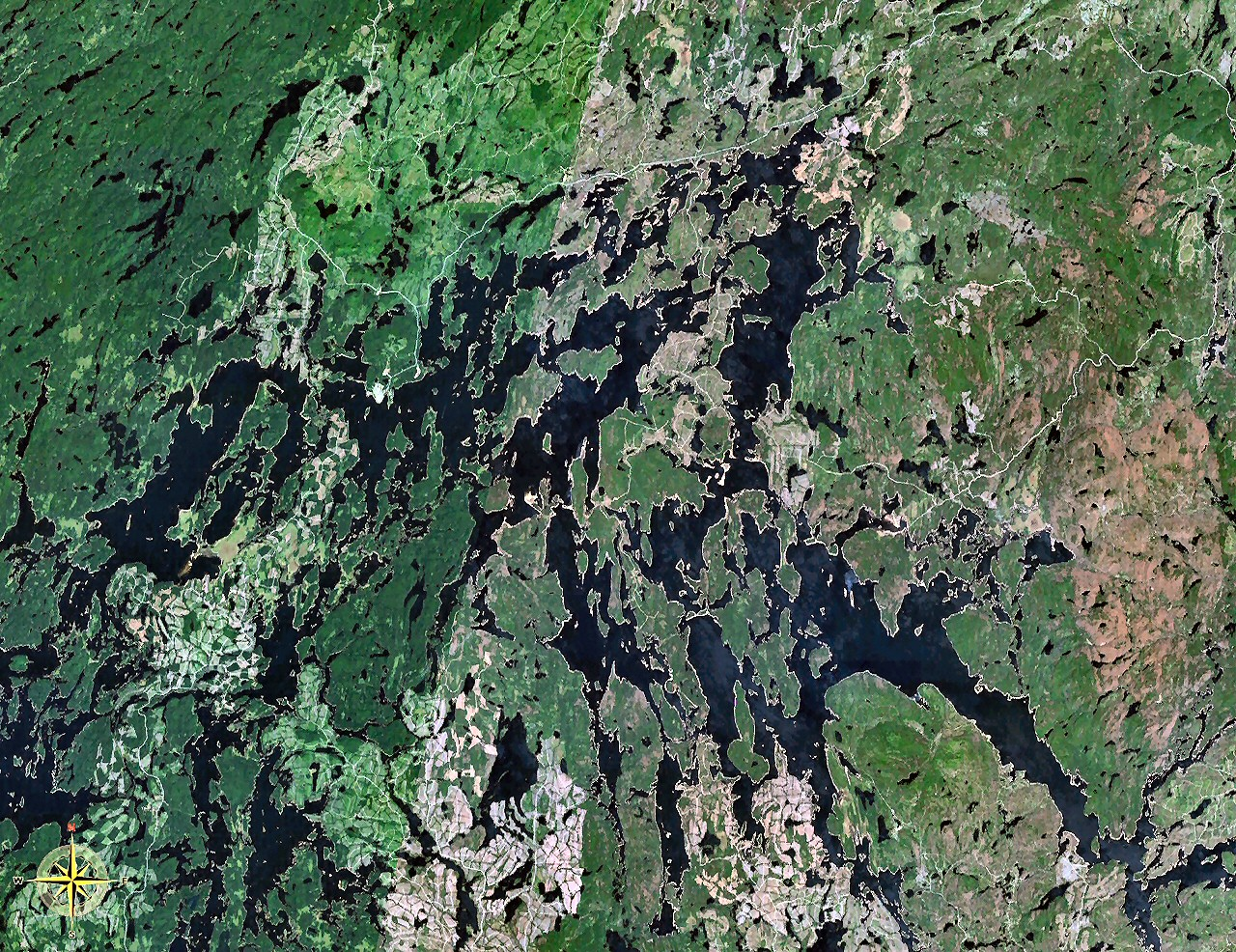
- Gouin Reservoir seen from space.

- Location within Quebec Location within Canada
- Location: La Tuque, Mauricie, Quebec
- Coordinates: 48°35′N 74°50′W
- Type: Artificial
- Primary outflows: Saint-Maurice River
- Basin countries: Canada
- Max. length: 100 km (62 mi)
- Max. width: 48 km (30 mi)
- Surface area: 1,570 km^{2} (610 sq mi)
- Average depth: 5 m (16 ft)
- Shore length^{1}: 5,650 km (3,510 mi)
- Surface elevation: 404 m (1,325 ft)
- Islands: De l'Oasis Island
- ^{1} Shore length is not a well-defined measure.

The Gouin Reservoir (French: Réservoir Gouin, pronounced [ʁezɛʁvwaʁ ɡwɛ̃]) is a man-made lake, fully within the boundaries of the City of La Tuque, Quebec, Canada. It is not one contiguous body of water, but the collective name for a series of connected lakes separated by innumerable bays, peninsulas, and islands with highly irregular shapes. It has therefore a relative long shoreline of over 5,600 km (3,500 mi) (excluding islands) compared to its surface area of 1,570 km^{2} (610 sq mi). It is the source of the Saint-Maurice River.

This large reservoir extends into the cantons of (in order, in row from north to south):

- Mathieu, Verreau;
- Lacasse, Toussaint, McSweeney, Magnan, Lindsay;
- Hanotaux, Cremazie, Lemay, Marmette, Brochu, Déziel;
- Poisson, Evanturel, Myrand, Chapman, Nevers, Aubin, Levasseur;
- Achintre, Sulte, Huguenin, Delage, Leblanc, Bureau.

== Recreational tourism activities ==
With a total of 275 km (171 mi) of waterways, this reservoir is a popular fishing destination with numerous commercial outfitters and private lodges along its shores. There are also a number of outfitters offering recreational tourism activities such hunting trips, fishing trips, excursions in all-terrain vehicles (ex.: snowmobiles, VTT), nautical expeditions, photographic hunting, lodging in cottages, in house-boat, in hostel (auberge)... Many of these outfitters also provide equipment supply and maintenance services related to recreational tourism activities. Generally, each outfitter is equipped with a marina offering various boating services.

== History ==
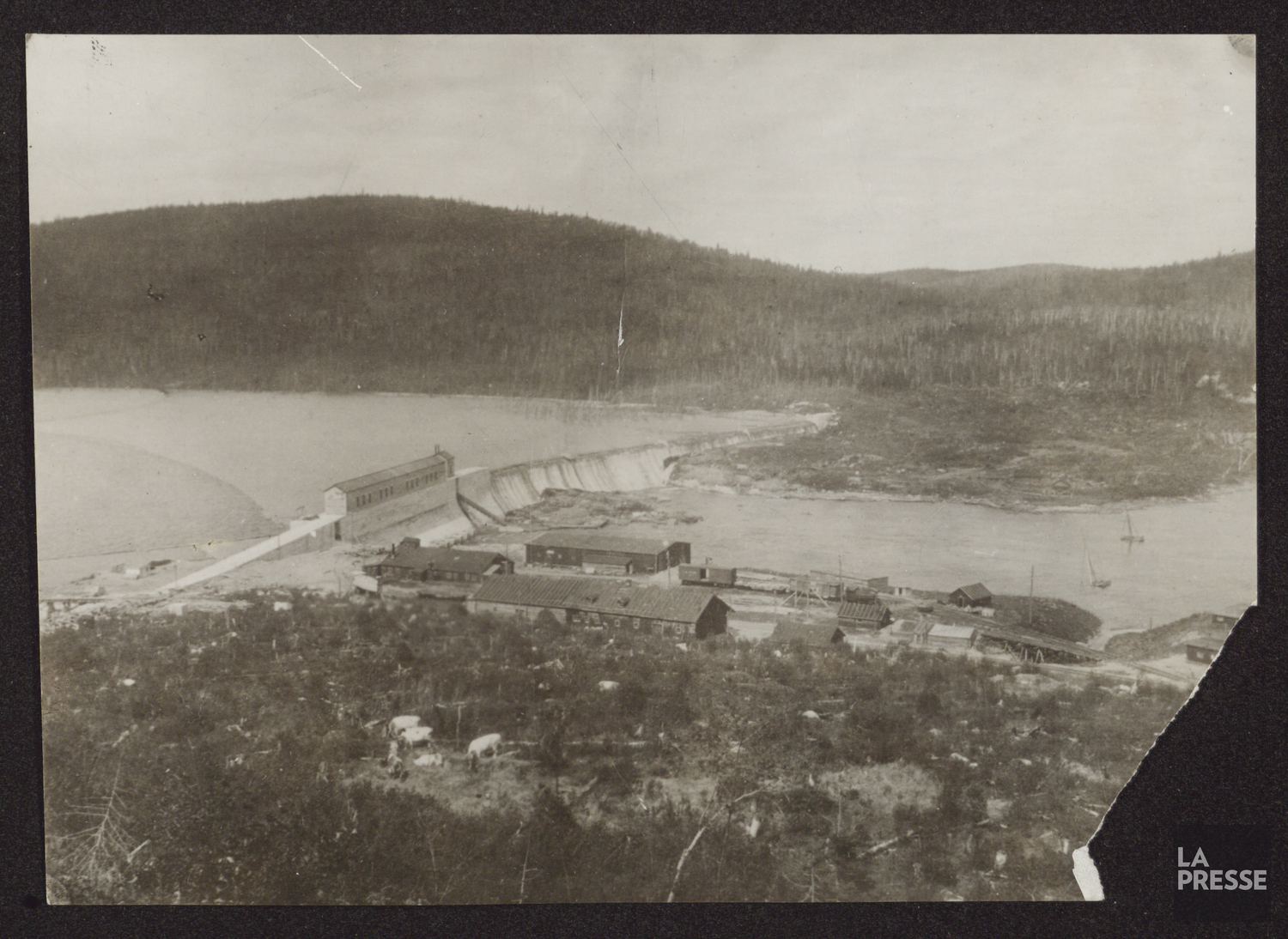
Gouin reservoir and dam at the Saint-Maurice River, sometime after 1918

The reservoir is named after Jean Lomer Gouin, who was Premier of Quebec when, in 1918, the Shawinigan Water & Power Company impounded the reservoir for hydroelectric development. The Gouin Reservoir has a 600 kW station for local use, but is used to control the flow of the St-Maurice River for the stations down-stream (all operated now by Hydro-Québec).

Initially, the "Commission des eaux courantes du Québec" (English: Quebec Running Water Board) wanted to facilitate the floating of wood that was routed via the Saint-Maurice River, to the paper mills of La Tuque to Trois-Rivières. The first work was built on La Loutre rapids in 1916–1917. The Shawinigan Water & Power Company decided to raise the level of the reservoir in 1948 and it was also decided to divert the headwaters of the Mégiscane River and the Suzie River, which flowed naturally to James Bay via the Mégiscane River, the Bell River (Quebec) and the Nottaway River; and to bring their waters to the Saint Lawrence River by the Saint-Maurice River. A series of dikes and canals were needed to divert the water from these rivers and still today; these works are unknown to the general public.

=== Village of Obedjiwan ===
The small Atikamekw community of Obedjiwan is located on the reservoir's north shore.

During the construction of the first Loutre dam (the name given to the dam prior to the Gouin name as it is known today), the Amerindians lived near Obedjiwan Lake, which was flooded when the reservoir was filled. At that time, the residents moved and rebuilt their village on the site of the present village of Obedjiwan, Quebec.

=== Village of Oskélanéo ===
The village of Oskélanéo is connected to Gouin Reservoir via Oskélanéo Lake and Oskélanéo River. This river flows on the south shore of Bureau Lake (Gouin Reservoir). The village of Oskélanéo was formed following the arrival in 1910 of the transcontinental railway; the station was designated "Oskélanéo River". Through the railway, the village became a supply depot and access point to the Rupert River, Mistassini Lake and other areas of northern Quebec. It also became a starting point for hunting and fishing expeditions in the region, as well as for forestry projects.

== Geography ==
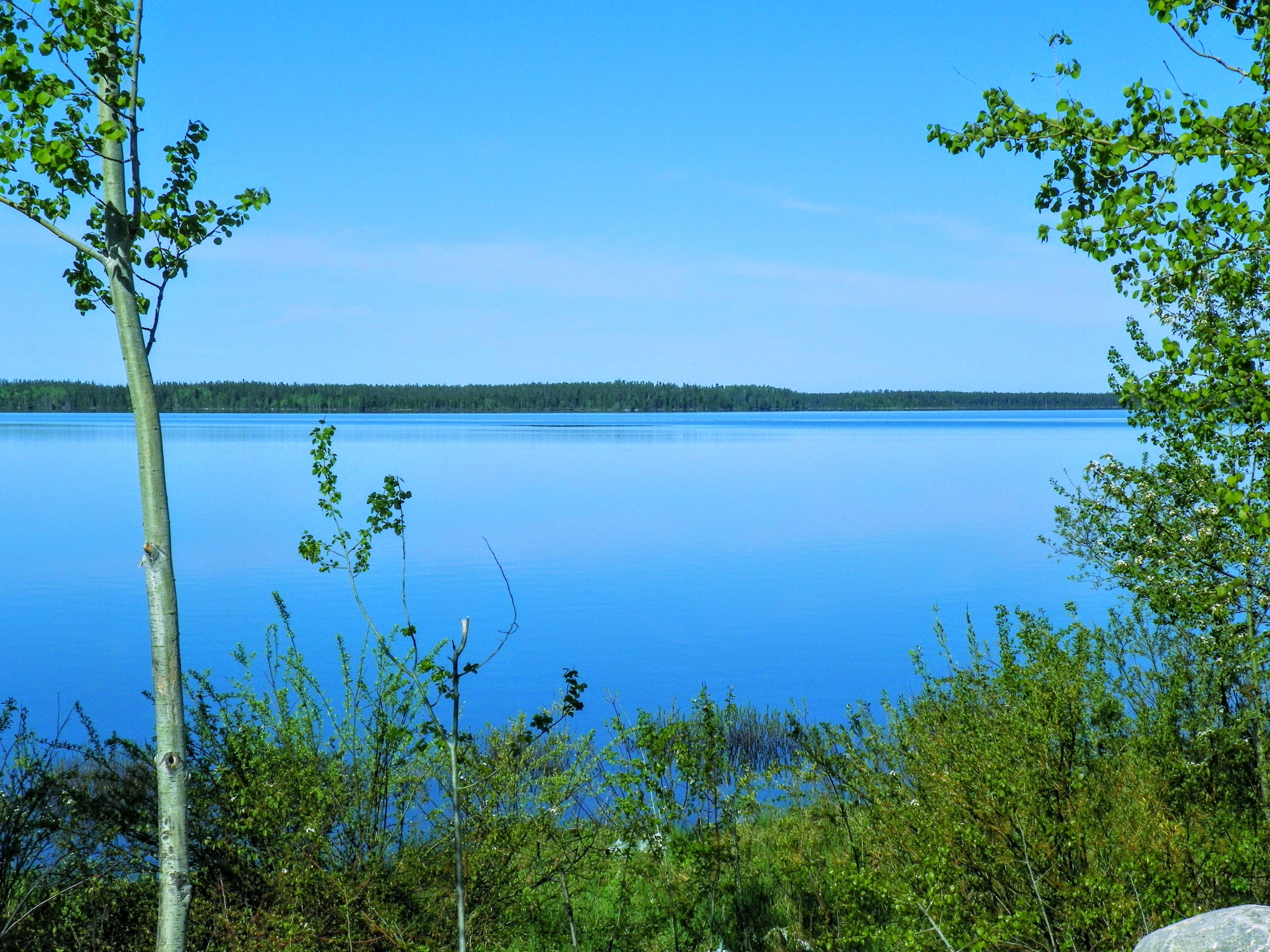
Gouin Reservoir at Obedjiwan

=== Road accesses ===
Although no paved road leads to the Gouin Reservoir, it is nevertheless accessible by several forested pathways, snowmobile trails and by air. The hydrographic slope of the Gouin Reservoir is accessible by:

- North side: route 212 from the village of Obedjiwan, Quebec and heading northeasterly following more or less the north shore of the Gouin reservoir, to the Normandin Lake (Normandin River) area. From Obedjiwan, Quebec, the forested road R1045 and R2046 are serving the North-West area of the reservoir;
- East side: the forest road 451 connecting Gouin Dam, the village of Wemotaci and La Tuque to the south; this road section serves in particular the valley of the Wapous River and Berlinguet Lake;
- South side: the forest road 400 serves the south-east part of the reservoir by passing to the Gouin Dam; Forest Road 404 serves the southwestern portion between the villages of Clova, Quebec and Parent;
- West side: the forested road R1009 (North–south direction) located west of the Pascagama River is serving the West coast of Gouin Reservoir.

=== Access by waterway from the railway ===
Outdoor enthusiasts can reach the Gouin Reservoir by canoe waterway from the Canadian National line connecting La Tuque to Senneterre, passing to the south of the reservoir (railway stops in order from west to east):

West part of the reservoir

- Kekek River: 36 km (22 mi) ride from "Rouleau Siding" downstream to the confluence of the Mégiscane River; path with R1 and R1-2 level rapids and some thresholds. Note: as a variant, the hobbyists may also take the Trévet River course (tributary of the Kekek River);
- Suzie River: 43 km (27 mi) to Du Poète Lake (Mégiscane River) with some obstacles. Note: Brécourt Lake and Du Poète Lake (Mégiscane River) are diverted to the Gouin Reservoir via the Adolphe-Poisson Bay;
- Mégiscane River: 38 km (24 mi) to reach the Mégiscane dam on the Lac du Poète; route with some rapids that are generally easy to cross;
- Flapjack River: 33 km (21 mi) to reach Mattawa Bay; navigable at all times and in both directions;
- Lacs Arcand and Tessier: 40 km (25 mi) to reach the Saraana Bay, with some rapids. This route is navigable at all times in both directions.

Centre part of the reservoir

- Oskélanéo River: 22 km (14 mi) to reach the South Bay Bureau Lake (Gouin Reservoir). This route is the busiest, being navigable at all times with river boats and easily in reverse.

The village of Parent and the village of Clova, Quebec, both now part of the City of La Tuque. These villages are located approximately 40 km (25 mi) south of the reservoir and are accessible by a forested road and by train with Via Rail.

A seaplane base is located at the top of the Gouin dam.

=== Main tributaries ===
The main rivers flowing into the Gouin reservoir are (clockwise from the Gouin dam):

South Shore

- Jean-Pierre River (Gouin Reservoir)
- Atimokateiw River
- De La Galette River (Gouin Reservoir)
  - Leblanc River (Gouin Reservoir)
- Wacekamiw River (via Mikisiw Armirikana Lake)
- Nemio River (via Bureau Lake)
- Oskélanéo River (via Bureau Lake)
  - Mistatikamekw River
- outlet of Tessier Lake (Gouin Reservoir) (via Saraana Bay)
  - Faucher River
- Flapjack River (via Mattawa Bay)
- Bignell Creek (via Adolphe-Poisson Bay)

West Shore

- Mégiscane River (upper part deviated by the dam of Du Poète Lake (Mégiscane River) to Adolphe-Poisson Bay)
- Suzie River (course deviated by the dam of Du Poète Lake (Mégiscane River) to Adolphe-Poisson Bay)
- Plamondon Creek (Gouin Reservoir) (via Plamondon Bay)
- Piponisiw River (via Simard Lake (Gouin Reservoir) and Du Mâle Lake (Gouin Reservoir))

North Shore

- De la Rencontre Creek (via Du Mâle Lake (Gouin Reservoir))
- Toussaint River (via Kamitcikamak Lake)
- Mathieu River
- Kakospictikweak River (via Omina Lake)
  - Pokotciminikew River
  - Wawackeciw River
- Kakiskeaskoparinaniwok River (linking Omina Lake and Verreau Bay)
- Eau Claire Creek (Gouin Reservoir) (via Verreau Bay)
  - Ohomisiw River (via Eau Claire Creek)

East Shore

- Verreau Creek (linked to Verreau Bay)
- Sakiciw River (linked to Magnan Lake)
- Barras Creek (linked to Magnan Lake)
  - Oskatcickic Brook
- Papactwe Creek (linked to Magnan Lake)
- Kiackw River (linked to Magnan Lake)
- Wapous River (via Déziel Lake)
- Au Vison River (via Au Vison Bay)
- Au Vison River West (via Au Vison Bay)

=== Main bays ===
This large reservoir has many bays and islands making navigation complex. Before the existence of geolocation systems that developed in the 2000s, many navigators lost their way on the water. (Clockwise, from the mouth)

South Shore

- Kikendatch Bay (related to Gouin Dam)
- Jean-Pierre Bay (Gouin Reservoir) (linked to Jean-Pierre River)
- Lion d'Or Bay
- À Brochets Bay
- Wacipemakak Bay (linked to Du Mâle Lake)
- South Marmette Bay (linked to Chapman Lake)
- De l'Oasis Bay (part of De l'Oasis Island)
- Kettle Bay (linked to Bouzanquet Bay)
- Bouzanquet Bay (linked to De La Galette River)
- Réal-Michaud Bay (linked to Marmette Bay South)
- Kokotcew Onikam Bay
- Kokotcew Bay
- Minikananik Bay
- Ganipi Bay (linked to Marmette Lake)
- De la Piscine Bay (part of Mikisiw Armirikana Lake)
- De la Barouette Bay (part of Mikisiw Armirikana Lake)
- North Bay of Bureau Lake (linked to Nemio River
- Nemio Bay (located at the mouth Nemio River
- East Bay of Bureau Lake
- South Bay of Bureau Lake (linked to Oskélanéo River)
- Atikamekwranan Bay
- Apokwatcik Bay (linked to Bureau Lake (South Bay))
- Bay of Danger (linked to Bureau Lake (South Bay))
- Bay of Stones Wall
- Couche-Tard Bay (linked to Bureau Lake (South Bay))
- Du Rocher-Matci Bay (linking Kaopatinak Pass and the Saraana Bay)
- Saraana Bay (linked to Du Mâle Lake)
- Mattawa Bay (linked to Flapjack River)
- Adolphe-Poisson Bay (linked to Bignell Creek and Du Mâle Lake)
- Piciw Minikanan Bay (linked to Adolphe-Poisson Bay)

West Shore

- Hanotaux Bay (linked to Du Mâle Lake)
- Wacapiskitek Bay (linked to Du Mâle Lake)

North Shore

- Plamondon Bay (Gouin Reservoir) (linked to Plamondon Creek)
- Wacapiskitek Bay (linked to Du Mâle Lake)
- Aiapew Bay (linked to Bourgeois Lake)
- Tcikitinaw Bay (linked to Bourgeois Lake)
- Kanatakompeak Bay, linked to Toussaint Lake
- Wapisiw Bay (linked to Marmette Lake)
- Eskwaskwakamak Bay (linked to Marmette Lake)
- Natcickweciw Bay
- Verreau Bay (Old name: Nemiscasioui Lake) (linked to Verreau Creek and Magnan Lake)

East Shore

- Aux Hélices Bay (French: Anse aux Hélices)
- Du Guide Bay
- Étoile Filante Bay
- Au Vison Bay (linked to Kikendatch Bay)
  - Julien Bay (linked to Au Vison Bay)
  - Au Vison Bay West (linked to Au Vison Bay)
- Kikendatch Bay
  - Du Petit Vison Bay
- Martel Bay

Bays of Islands

- Des Aigles Bay (linked to Dû Mâle Lake)
- Atikamekwranan Bay
- De Sable Bay (Pass)
- Thibodeau Bay (linked to Du Mâle Lake and Bourgeois Lake)
- Wacihiskacik Bay (linked to Bourgeois Lake)
- Wacawkak Bay
- De la paire de Culottes Bay (linked to McSweeney Lake)
- Kapiskitcitciwecimok Bay (linked to Marmette Bay South)

=== Main islands ===
(Clockwise, from the mouth)

South area

- Morin Island (in Kikendatch Bay)
- Serpent Island (in Jean-Pierre Bay)
- Aux Trembles Island (in Kikendatch Bay)
- Kaminictikotanak Island (in Brochu Lake (Gouin Reservoir))
- Aux Femmes Island (in Nevers Lake (Gouin Reservoir))
- De La Croix Island (in Nevers Lake (Gouin Reservoir))
- De La Main Island (in Kettle Bay)
- Du Sanglier (in Kettle Bay)
- Demi-Lune Island (in Lepage Lake (Wacekamiw River))
- Aux Mouettes Island (in Saraana Bay)
- De La Police Island (in Saraana Bay)

North area

- Matci Rock (at South of Du Mâle Lake)
- Kaoskiskanikak Island (in Toussaint Lake)
- Kosapitcikan Island
- Matenen Island (in McSweeney Lake)
- Tcipai Island (in Magnan Lake)
- Toman Island (in Magnan Lake)
- Matenen Island (at the limit of Toussaint Lake and Marmette Lake)
- Tiom Island (in Eskwaskwakamak Bay)
- Kaopapiskitek Rock
- Kaopapiskitek Island

East area

- Tciman Island (in Magnan Lake)
- Amérique Island (in Brochu Lake)
- Oasis Island (forming the boundary between Marmette Bay South and Nevers Lake (Gouin Reservoir))

=== Main lakes ===
The main lakes included in the reservoir or related are: Toussaint, Magnan, McSweeney and Du Mâle Lake. (Clockwise, from the mouth)

South area

- Nevers Lake (linking Chapman Lake (Gouin Reservoir) and Brochu Lake)
- Chapman Lake (Gouin Reservoir) (linking Du Mâle Lake)
- Kaackakwakamak Lake (linked to Magnan Lake)
- Mikisiw Amirikanan Lake (linked to Ganipi Bay)
- Bureau Lake (linked on North to Toussaint Lake (Gouin Reservoir))

West area

- Saveney Lake (linked to Adolphe-Poisson Bay)
- Miller Lake (linked to Du Mâle Lake (Gouin Reservoir))
  - Simard Lake (linked to Miller Lake)
  - Lacasse Lake (linked to Miller Lake)
- Du Mâle Lake (linked to Plamondon Creek and De la Rencontre Creek)

North area

- Kaopiskak Lake (linked to Aiapew Bay)
- Bourgeois Lake
- Toussaint Lake (linking Du Mâle Lake and Marmette Lake)
- Marmette Lake (Gouin Reservoir) (linking Toussaint Lake and McSweeney Lake)
- Fou Lake (Gouin Reservoir) (linked to McSweeney Lake)
- McSweeney Lake
- Kamitcikamak Lake (linked to Toussaint River)
- Kawawiekamak Lake (linked to McSweeney Lake)
- Omina Lake (linking Kawawiekamak Lake and Verreau Bay)
- Magnan Lake (linking Verreau Bay and McSweeney Lake)

East area

- Brochu Lake (linked to Kikendatch Bay, which is related to Gouin Dam)
- Little Brochu Lake
- Déziel Lake (Gouin Reservoir) (linking Wapous River to Gouin Reservoir)
  - Du Déserteur Lake (Gouin Reservoir)
- Minikanakik Lake (linked to Déziel Lake)
- Duchet Lake (on an island of Center-East part of the reservoir)
- Kamoskosoweskak Lake (on an island of Center-East part of the reservoir)

=== Main passes ===
The many passes between the islands or peninsulas facilitate navigation on the reservoir.(Clockwise, from the mouth)

- Kanatawatciwok Pass (linked to Nevers Lake)
- Sawrananik Pass (linking Marmette Lake and McSweeney Lake)
- De l'Oasis Pass (linked to Marmette Bay South)
- Piripohonan Pass (linking McSweeney Lake and lac Marmette)
- Lac Fou Pass (linked to Fou Lake and Magnan Lake)
- De Sable Bay (pass linking Magnan Lake and Nevers Lake (old name: Kawpitawkitciwak Pass)
- Kaopisaskwak Pass (located in Kanatakompeak Bay linked to Toussaint Lake)
- Kapikakamicik Pass (located at the limit North of Marmette Lake and Eskwaskwakamak Bay)
- Matawanikacik Arm (located at South-West of Toussaint Lake)
- Kice Matawanikak Arm (located at South-West of Toussaint Lake)
- Kacipatanacik Pass (linked Thibodeau Bay and Bourgeois Lake
- Kaopatinak Pass (linking the Du Mâle Lake and Du Rocher-Matci Bay)
- Kaackakocimocik Pass (linking Kawawiekamak Lake and Omina Lake)
- Pinpohonan Pass (McSweeney Lake)
- Tête du Magnan Pass (linking Magnan Lake and McSweeney Lake) (Old name: Kakinikwantciwak Pass)
- Pirotew Pawctikw Pass (in Eastern part of Magnan Lake)

== Fauna ==
=== Fish ===
Fish species present include the walleye, northern pike, and sauger. Fishers sometimes catch lake trout and brook trout, but these species are more marginal because this vast body of water is the ideal reference point for pike, which is very fond of small fish.

=== Waterfowl ===
Waterfowl present in the region include the American black duck (Anas rubripes), mallard (Anas platyrhynchos), green-winged teal (Anas crecca), ring-necked duck (Aythya collaris), common merganser (Mergus merganser), hooded merganser (Lophodytes cucullatus), common goldeneye (Bucephala clangula), bufflehead (Bucephala albeola), common loon (Gavia immer), Canada goose (Branta canadensis), bald eagle (Haliaeetus leucocephalus).

=== Mammals ===
The main mammals in Haute-Mauricie are: moose, white-tailed deer, bears, hares, red foxes, muskrats, skunks and raccoons.

The fishermen are required to comply with the regulations, especially when the number of catch. Depending on the season, hunting is also regulated by territory, type of game and type of weapon.

=== Gouin Reservoir Community Wildlife Area ===
The "Gouin Reservoir Community Wildlife Area" works to preserve the diversity of wildlife, improve the quality of fishing and protect it. In its role of surveillance of the territory, this non-profit organization collaborates with the Ministry of Forests, Wildlife and Parks (MFFP) to maintain a good management of the fish resource.
