= Leblanc River =

Leblanc
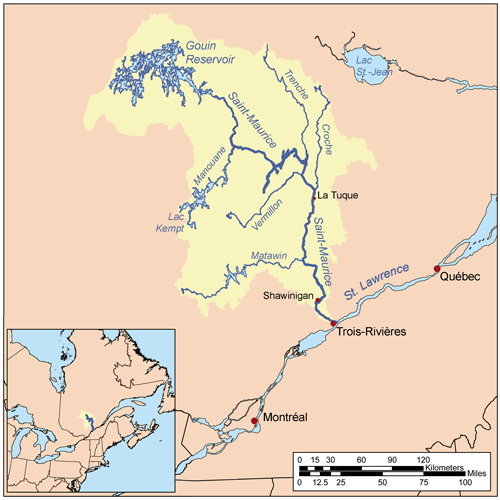
- Map of Saint-Maurice watershed.

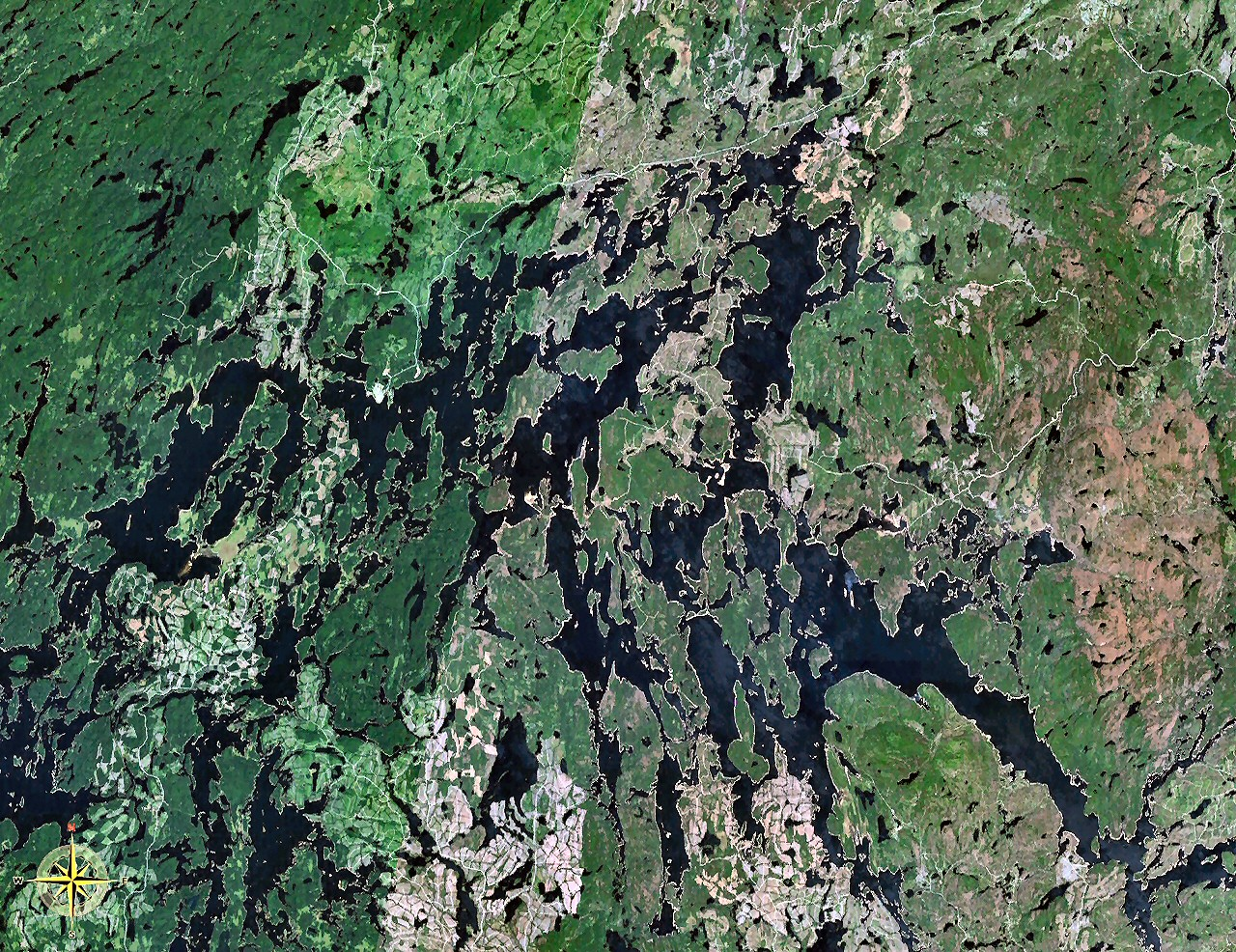
- Map of Gouin Reservoir seen from space

Location
- Country: Canada
- Province: Quebec
- Region: Mauricie

Physical characteristics
- Source: Machinila Lake
  - location: La Tuque, Mauricie, Quebec
  - coordinates: 48°08′08″N 74°25′36″W
  - elevation: 435 m (1,427 ft)
- Mouth: Gouin Reservoir
  - location: La Tuque, Mauricie, Quebec
  - coordinates: 48°18′13″N 74°26′30″W
  - elevation: 402 m (1,319 ft)
- Length: 32.8 km (20.4 mi)

Basin features
- Tributaries
  - left: (upstream); Outlet of lake Hector.
  - right: (upstream); Outlet of lakes Laure, Vincent and Raven; outlet of lake Bill (via le Lac Leblanc); outlet of lakes Paragon and de l’Histoire (via "Lake du Gros Ours").

The Leblanc River is a tributary of the De La Galette River, flowing on the south shore of the Gouin Reservoir, in the territory of the town of La Tuque, in the Mauricie administrative region, in Quebec, in Canada.

The Leblanc River runs successively in the Decelles and Leblanc townships, south of the Gouin Reservoir and on the west side of the upper Saint-Maurice River. Forestry is the main economic activity of this valley; recreational tourism activities, second.

The route 400, connecting Gouin Dam to the village of Parent, Quebec, serves the Leblanc River Valley; this road also serves the peninsula which stretches north in the Gouin Reservoir on 30.1 kilometres (18.7 mi). Some secondary forest roads are in use nearby for forestry and recreational tourism activities.

The surface of the Leblanc River is usually frozen from mid-November to the end of April, however, safe ice circulation is generally from early December to late March.

== Geography ==
The neighboring hydrographic slopes of the Leblanc River are:
- north side: Gouin Reservoir, Bouzanquet Bay, Vincent Lake, Brochu Lake, Kettle Bay;
- east side: Atimokateiw River, Jean-Pierre River (Gouin Reservoir), Saint-Maurice River, Cypress River (La Tuque);
- south side: Decelles Lake, Bazin River, Norah Creek, Bellerive River, West Pichoui River;
- west side: Delage Lake, Five Mile Lake, Bureau Lake, Gouin Reservoir, Oskélanéo River.

The Leblanc River originates at the mouth of Decelles Lake (length: 5.7 kilometres (3.5 mi); altitude: 435 metres (1,427 ft)). This lake straddles the townships of Fréchette and Decelles. The mouth of this head lake is located at:

- 18.8 kilometres (11.7 mi) south-east of the mouth of the Leblanc River (confluence with Bouzanquet Bay of Gouin Reservoir);
- 22.8 kilometres (14.2 mi) southwest of the dam at the mouth of the Gouin Reservoir (confluence with the Saint-Maurice River);
- 54.8 kilometres (34.1 mi) north-east of the village center of Wemotaci, Quebec which is located along the Saint-Maurice River;
- 145 kilometres (90 mi) north-west of downtown La Tuque.

From the mouth of Decelles Lake, the course of the Leblanc River flows over 32.8 kilometres (20.4 mi) according to the following segments:

- 12.3 kilometres (7.6 mi) northeasterly to the west shore of Big Bear Lake;
- 3.6 kilometres (2.2 mi) north across Big Bear Lake (length: 5.0 kilometres (3.1 mi); altitude: 412 metres (1,352 ft)). Note: This lake straddles the townships of Leblanc and Decelles;
- 5.3 kilometres (3.3 mi) to the Northwest passing between two mountains, then crossing Lake Leblanc (length: 3.7 kilometres (2.3 mi); altitude: 401 metres (1,316 ft)), in full length, to its mouth;
- 5.7 kilometres (3.5 mi) northwesterly across a swamp area, then recovering the dump (coming from the north-east) of an unidentified lake and crossing over 0.2 kilometres (0.12 mi) the eastern part of Motard Lake, to its mouth;
- 5.9 kilometres (3.7 mi) northwesterly, forming a hook of 0.8 kilometres (0.50 mi) north-east at the beginning of the segment, to its mouth.

The confluence of the Leblanc River with the Gouin Reservoir is located at:

- 18.3 kilometres (11.4 mi) south-west of the Gouin dam;
- 110 kilometres (68 mi) south-east of the village center of Obedjiwan, Quebec;
- 55.4 kilometres (34.4 mi) north-west of the village center of Wemotaci, Quebec;
- 137 kilometres (85 mi) north-west of downtown La Tuque;
- 216 kilometres (134 mi) northwest of the mouth of the Saint-Maurice River (confluence with the St. Lawrence River at Trois-Rivières).
The Leblanc River flows on the east bank of De La Galette Lake (Gouin Reservoir) which is crossed by De La Galette River (Gouin Reservoir); the latest has a widening at this location of 1.9 kilometres (1.2 mi). From there, the current flows north-west on 1.3 kilometres (0.81 mi) to the mouth of the la Galette River; 9.5 kilometres (5.9 mi) northwesterly to the mouth of Bouzanquet Bay; then cross the Gouin Reservoir on 34.8 kilometres (21.6 mi) bypassing a large peninsula by the North, crossing Brochu Lake and Kikendatch Bay until Gouin dam.

== Toponymy ==
The term "Leblanc" is a family name of French origin.

The toponym "Leblanc River" was formalized on August 17, 1978 at the Commission de toponymie du Quebec.

== See also ==
- Saint-Maurice River
- Gouin Reservoir, a body of water
- Kikendatch Bay
- Brochu Lake, a body of water
- Bouzanquet Bay
- De la Galette River (Gouin Reservoir), a watercourse
- De la Galette Lake (Gouin Reservoir), a waterbody
- La Tuque, a city
- Haute-Mauricie, a territory corresponding to the town of La Tuque
- List of rivers of Quebec
