= Magnan Lake (Gouin Reservoir) =

Lake in Reservoir Gouin, in Quebec, Canada

- Location within Quebec
- Location: La Tuque, Mauricie, Quebec, Canada
- Coordinates: 48°42′21″N 74°35′01″W
- Type: Reservoir lake
- Primary inflows: McSweeney Lake (via passe du Lac Fou and passe de la Tête du Magnan), Verreau Bay, Déziel Lake, Barras Stream, lac Toupin, Nimepir River, décharge du lac Leclerc.
- Primary outflows: Brochu Lake (Gouin Reservoir), Nevers Lake (Gouin Reservoir)
- Max. length: 29.1 kilometres (18.1 mi)
- Max. width: 7.8 kilometres (4.8 mi)
- Surface elevation: 402 metres (1,319 ft)

The Lake Magnan is a freshwater body located in the eastern part of Gouin Reservoir, in the territory of the town of La Tuque, in the administrative region of Mauricie, in the province of Quebec, in Canada.

== Toponymy ==
The current extent of Lake Magnan covers the former lakes: "Lake Asawewasenan", "Lake Assiwanan" and "Lake des Battures de Sable".

The toponym "Lac Magnan" was formalized on 18 December 1986 by the Commission de toponymie du Québec.

== See also ==
- Saint-Maurice River, a stream
- Oasis Island, an island
