= Omina Lake =

Lake in Reservoir Gouin, in Quebec, Canada

- Location within Quebec
- Location: La Tuque, Mauricie, Quebec, Canada,
- Coordinates: 48°45′30″N 74°43′00″W
- Type: Reservoir lake
- Primary inflows: Kakospictikweak River
- Primary outflows: Verreau Bay, Kawawiekamak Lake
- Max. length: 15.8 kilometres (9.8 mi)
- Max. width: 3.9 kilometres (2.4 mi)
- Surface elevation: 402 metres (1,319 ft) (altitude varying according to the water management of the Gouin dam)

The Lake Omina is a freshwater body located in the northeastern part of Gouin Reservoir, in the territory of the town of La Tuque, in the administrative region of the Mauricie, in the province of Quebec, in Canada.

This lake extends into the townships of Mathieu, Verreau, McSweeney and Magnan.

Recreational tourism is the main economic activity in the area due to its strategic position for navigation, being located near Route 212, as well as between the village of Obedjiwan and Verreau Stream.

The hydrographic slope of Lake Omina is served on the north side by road 212 connecting the village of Obedjiwan to the east shore of Gouin Reservoir; this road provides access to Toussaint Lake, the various bays on the northeast shore of Gouin Reservoir as well as the Verreau Stream area. Some secondary forest roads have been built on the north shore of Gouin Reservoir for logging and recreational tourism activities.

The surface of Lake Omina is usually frozen from mid-November to the end of April, however safe traffic on the ice is generally from the beginning of December to the end of March. Water management at the Gouin dam can cause significant variations in the water level, particularly at the end of winter when the water is lowered in anticipation of the spring melt.

== Toponymy ==
The toponym "Lac Omina" was formalized on 18 December 1986 by the Commission de toponymie du Québec.

== See also ==
- List of lakes in Canada
