= Verreau Bay =

Lake in Reservoir Gouin, in Quebec, Canada

- Location within Quebec
- Location: Mauricie, La Tuque, Quebec, Canada
- Coordinates: 48°47′26″N 74°35′22″W
- Type: Bay in dammed reservoir
- Primary inflows: Ruisseau Verreau, ruisseau à l'Eau Claire (réservoir Gouin), rivière Kakiskeaskoparinaniwok.
- Primary outflows: Omina Lake, Magnan Lake
- Max. length: 12.4 kilometres (7.7 mi)
- Max. width: 5.4 kilometres (3.4 mi)
- Surface elevation: 402 metres (1,319 ft)

The Verreau Bay is a freshwater body located in the northeast part of Gouin Reservoir, in the territory of the town of La Tuque, in the administrative region of the Mauricie, in the province of Quebec, in Canada.

== Toponymy ==
The term "Verreau" constitutes a surname of French origin. Formerly, this body of water was designated "Lac Nemiscaioui".

The toponym "Baie Verreau" was made official on December 5, 1968, by the Commission de toponymie du Québec, i.e. when this organization was created.

== See also ==
- Saint-Maurice River, a stream
- List of lakes in Canada
