= Atimokateiw River =

Atimokateiw
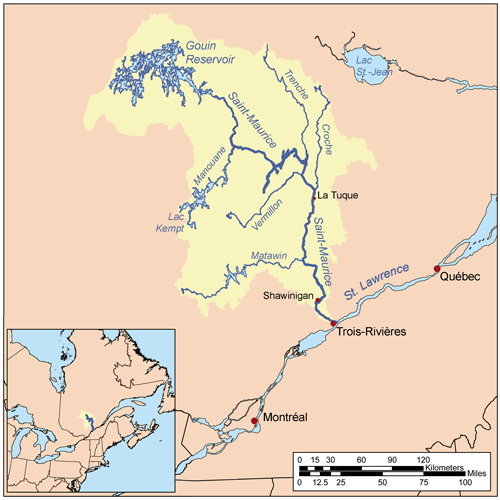
- Plan de la rivière Saint-Maurice

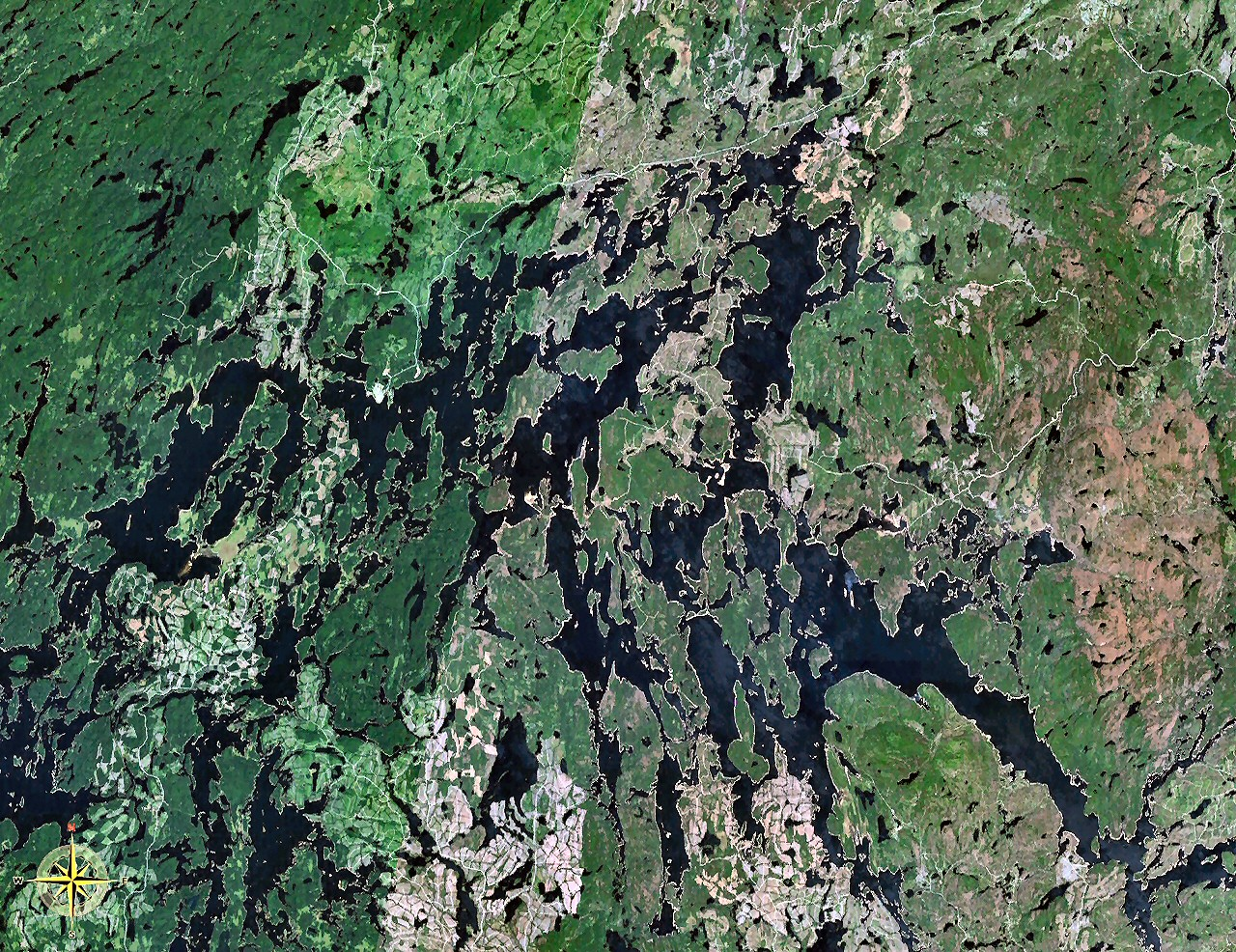
- Map of Gouin Reservoir seen from space

Location
- Country: Canada
- Province: Quebec
- Region: Mauricie

Physical characteristics
- Source: Unidentified Lake
  - location: La Tuque, Mauricie, Quebec
  - coordinates: 48°24′36″N 74°24′20″W
  - elevation: 469 m (1,539 ft)
- Mouth: Gouin Reservoir (Kikendatch Bay)
  - location: La Tuque, Mauricie, Quebec
  - coordinates: 48°22′25″N 74°20′20″W
  - elevation: 402 m (1,319 ft)
- Length: 31.6 km (19.6 mi)

The Atimokateiw River is a tributary of the south shore of the Gouin Reservoir, flowing into the territory of the town of La Tuque, in the area of Mauricie, Quebec, Canada.

The Atimokateiw River flows entirely in the township of Aubin, to the south-east of the Gouin Reservoir. Forestry is the main economic activity of this valley; recreational tourism activities, second.

A forest road branch serves the valley of the Atimokateiw River and the peninsula which stretches north on 30.1 kilometres (18.7 mi). This road branch connects to route 400 which bypasses the south-eastern part of the Gouin Reservoir. It connects the village of Parent, Quebec (via the vallée of Bazin River) and the village Wemotaci, Quebec which is located west of La Tuque, Quebec.

The surface of the Atimokateiw River is usually frozen from mid-November to the end of April, however, safe ice circulation is generally from early December to late March.

== Geography ==
The surrounding hydrographic slopes of the Atimokateiw River are:
- north side: Gouin Reservoir, Magnan Lake, McSweeney Lake, Wapous River;
- east side: Kikendatch Bay, Payolas Creek, Leblanc River, Saint-Maurice River, Jean-Pierre River;
- south side: West Pichoui River, Bellerive River, Saint-Maurice River, Bazin River, Drouin River;
- west side: Kettle Bay, Chapman Lake, Gouin Reservoir, Leblanc River, Nevers Lake, Five Mile Lake.

The Atimokateiw River originates at the mouth of an unidentified lake (length: 0.8 kilometres (0.50 mi) altitude: 469 metres (1,539 ft)). The mouth of this head lake is located at:

- 6.6 kilometres (4.1 mi) north-east of the mouth of the Atimokateiw River (confluence with a bay of Gouin Reservoir);
- 24.0 kilometres (14.9 mi) west of the dam at the mouth of the Gouin Reservoir (confluence with the Saint-Maurice River);
- 47.9 kilometres (29.8 mi) south-east of the village center of Obedjiwan (located on a peninsula on the north shore of Gouin Reservoir);
- 162.9 kilometres (101.2 mi) north-west of downtown La Tuque.

From the mouth of the head lake, the course of the Atimokateiw River flows over 14.6 kilometres (9.1 mi) according to the following segments:

- 4.8 kilometres (3.0 mi) south to the mouth of a small lake between two mountains;
- 4.9 kilometres (3.0 mi) to the south-east, skirting by the north a mountain whose summit reached 566 metres (1,857 ft) and by the north of a second mountain whose summit reached 530 metres (1,740 ft), to the mouth of a small lake;
- 4.9 kilometres (3.0 mi) northeasterly, forming a curve to the south, to its mouth.

The confluence of the "Atimokateiw River" with the Gouin Reservoir is located at:

- 18.0 kilometres (11.2 mi) west of Gouin Dam;
- 54.5 kilometres (33.9 mi) south-east of the village center of Obedjiwan, Quebec;
- 66.7 kilometres (41.4 mi) north-west of the village center of Wemotaci, Quebec;
- 155.7 kilometres (96.7 mi) north-west of downtown La Tuque;
- 262 kilometres (163 mi) northwest of the mouth of the Saint-Maurice River (confluence with the St. Lawrence River at Trois-Rivières).

The Atimokateiw River flows south of a bay stretching northward 2.9 kilometres (1.8 mi), which is an extension to the east of the Gouin Reservoir; this bay is barred on the east side by a peninsula stretching northward on 1.6 kilometres (0.99 mi). From the mouth of this bay, the current flows eastward on 18.6 kilometres (11.6 mi) across the Kikendatch Bay to the Gouin Dam. From

there, the current flows along the Saint-Maurice River to Trois-Rivières, where it flows on the North Shore of the St. Lawrence River.

== Toponymy ==
This hydronym is of aboriginal origin.

The toponym "Atimokateiw River" was formalized on May 31, 1985 at the Commission de toponymie du Québec.

== See also ==
- Saint-Maurice River
- Gouin Reservoir, a body of water
- La Tuque, Quebec, a city
- Haute-Mauricie, a territory corresponding to the town of La Tuque
- List of rivers of Quebec
