= Nevers Lake (Gouin Reservoir) =

Lake in Reservoir Gouin, in Quebec, Canada

- Location within Quebec
- Location: La Tuque, Mauricie, Quebec, Canada
- Coordinates: 48°28′08″N 74°37′53″W
- Type: Dammed lake
- Primary inflows: Chapman Lake et le Marmette Lake (via baie Marmette Sud) via a common pass, discharge of Oasis Lake, discharge of lacs du Capitaine and Lilie, McSweeney Lake (via Passe du Lac Fou) and discharge of lake Kaakakwakamak.
- Primary outflows: Brochu Lake
- Max. length: 17.1 kilometres (10.6 mi)
- Max. width: 8.9 kilometres (5.5 mi)
- Surface elevation: 402 metres (1,319 ft)

The Lake Nevers is a vast body of fresh water in the Center-East part of Gouin Reservoir, in the territory of the town of La Tuque, in Haute-Mauricie, in the administrative region of Mauricie, in the province of Quebec, in Canada.

== Toponymy ==
The term "Nevers" is a family name of English origin.

The toponym "Lac Nevers" was made official on 18 December 1986 by the Commission de toponymie du Québec.

== See also ==
- Saint-Maurice River, a stream
- Champman Lake, a body of water
- Kaackakwakamak Lake, a body of water
- Bouzanquet Bay, a body of water
- Oasis Island, an island
- List of lakes in Canada
