= McSweeney Lake =

Lake in Reservoir Gouin, in Quebec, Canada

- Location within Quebec
- Location: La Tuque, Mauricie, Quebec, Canada
- Coordinates: 48°38′34″N 74°46′11″W
- Type: Reservoir lake
- Primary inflows: Marmette Lake, Magnan Lake.
- Primary outflows: passe de la Tête du Magnan, Nevers Lake, Brochu Lake.
- Max. length: 34.7 kilometres (21.6 mi)
- Max. width: 6.7 kilometres (4.2 mi)
- Surface elevation: 402 metres (1,319 ft) (altitude varying according to the water management of the Gouin dam)

The Lake McSweeney is a freshwater body located in the Center-East part of Gouin Reservoir, in the territory of the town of La Tuque, in the administrative region of the Mauricie, in the province of Quebec, in Canada.

This lake in the middle of the Center-East part of the Gouin reservoir straddles the townships of McSweeney, Magnan, Marmette and Brochu.

Recreational tourism activities constitute the main economic activity of the sector because of its strategic position for navigation, being located between Marmette Lake, Magnan Lake and Nevers.

The hydrographic slope of Lake McSweeney is served indirectly on the north side by route 212 connecting the village of Obedjiwan to the east shore of the Gouin Reservoir; this road provides access to Toussaint Lake and to the various bays on the northeast shore of the Gouin Reservoir. A few secondary forest roads have been built on the North-North shore of the Gouin Reservoir for logging and recreational activities.

The surface of McSweeney Lake is usually frozen from mid-November to the end of April, however safe traffic on the ice is generally from the beginning of December to the end of March. Water management at the Gouin dam can cause significant variations in the water level, particularly at the end of winter when the water is lowered in anticipation of the spring melt.

== Geography ==
Before the construction of La Loutre Dam was completed in 1916, thus creating Gouin Reservoir, lake McSweeney had a smaller dimension. After the second raising of the waters of the Gouin reservoir in 1948 due to the development of the Gouin Dam, Lake McSweeney took on its current form.

The main neighboring watersheds of Lake McSweeney are:

- north side: bay of the pair of Culottes, Eskwaskwakamak Bay, Kawawiekamak Lake, Mathieu Lake, Omina Lake, Pokotciminikew River;
- east side: Fou Lake, lac Duchet, Magnan Lake, Verreau Bay;
- south side: Nemio River, Mikisiw Amirikanan lake, Ganipi Bay, South Marmette Bay, Nevers Lake, Brochu Lake;
- west side: Marmette Lake, Toussaint Lake, Kanatakompeak Bay, Aiapew Bay, Bourgeois Lake, Thibodeau Bay, Lac du Mâle, Kapikakamicik pass;
- Southwest side: Kokotcew Onikam bay.

With a length of 34.7 kilometres (21.6 mi) and a maximum width of 6.7 kilometres (4.2 mi), the lake McSweeney is bounded by:

- North-West side (from the South):
  - by a peninsula (length: 13.9 kilometres (8.6 mi)) going north along more or less the limit of the townships of Lemay and Marmette;
  - by an archipelago of the Kaoskiskanikak Islands whose longest island stretches 2.5 kilometres (1.6 mi);
  - by a large island (length: 6.2 kilometres (3.9 mi));
  - through the Piripohonan pass, separating the previous island with the next island;
  - by a large misshapen island delimiting at its southwest the Marmette Lake, at its northwest side by Kawawiekamak Lake and at its east side the pass of the Head of Magnan;
- South-East side (from the North):
  - by an island (length: 3.3 kilometres (2.1 mi)) forming the eastern shore of the Passe de la Tête du Magnan;
  - by a second island (length: 21.4 kilometres (13.3 mi)) comprising in particular the outlet of Lake Duchet from Lake Kamoskosoweskak;
  - by a third island (length: 12.5 kilometres (7.8 mi)) forming the west shore of Lac Fou (length: 4.7 kilometres (2.9 mi) (North–south direction) ending in the South with a hook facing east where it joins a bay in Nevers Lake;
  - by a peninsula on the eastern shore starting at the mouth of Mikisiw Amirikanan Lake, which extends northeastward to a strait constituting the entrance to southern Marmette bay;
  - by a peninsula containing the outlet of Mikisiw Amirikanan Lake which is fed by the Wacekamiw River; the latter has its source at Lepage Lake.
- southwest side: by Ganipi Bay (length: 8.7 kilometres (5.4 mi)) supplied to the south in particular by the outlet of Lake Kawacekamik and bordered to the east by a peninsula which separates it from Mikisiw Amirikanan Lake (east side of the bay).

The mouth of Lake McSweeney is located south of the lake, either at:

- 19.3 kilometres (12.0 mi) north-west of the pass that separates South Marmette Bay and Nevers Lake;
- 13.2 kilometres (8.2 mi) east of the village center of Obedjiwan;
- 57.7 kilometres (35.9 mi) north-west of Gouin Dam;
- 108.3 kilometres (67.3 mi) north-west of the center of the village of Wemotaci (north shore of the Saint-Maurice River) (confluence with the St. Lawrence River at Trois-Rivières).

From the mouth of McSweeney Lake, the current flows over 75.1 kilometres (46.7 mi) to the south-east, to the Gouin Dam, in the following segments:

- 25.7 kilometres (16.0 mi) towards the South-East, crossing southern Marmette bay;
- 7.3 kilometres (4.5 mi) north, then southeast, bypassing Île à la Croix, to Kanatawatciwok Pass (near Île aux Femmes); this pass connects lake Nevers (Gouin reservoir) and Brochu lake (Gouin reservoir);
- 41.1 kilometres (25.5 mi) passing south of Kaminictikotanak Island and bypassing to the north a large peninsula attached to the south shore of Gouin reservoir. Then descending into the south-eastern arm of Brochu Lake; and east through Kikendatch Bay to Gouin Dam.

From this dam, the current follows the Saint-Maurice River to Trois-Rivières where it flows onto the north shore of the St. Lawrence River.

== Toponymy ==
The lake, which is part of the Gouin Reservoir, owes its name because it is the largest body of water in the Township of McSweeney. The name appears on a map in 1940. As for the canton, it owes its name, as for the neighboring cantons of Magnan, Toussaint and Lacasse, to a former teacher at the Laval Normal School in Quebec. Daniel McSweeney made a career as a teacher at the École normale Laval between 1864 and 1887. He had married Brigit O'Byrne in 1857 in Quebec.

The lake also known as Baie Marmette Nord.

== See also ==
- Nevers Lake, a body of water
- List of lakes in Canada
