= Jean-Pierre River =

Tributary of Jean-Pierre Bay in Quebec, Canada

Jean-Pierre
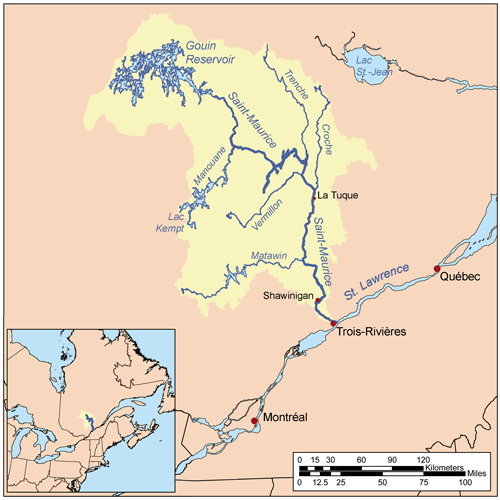
- Map of Saint-Maurice watershed.

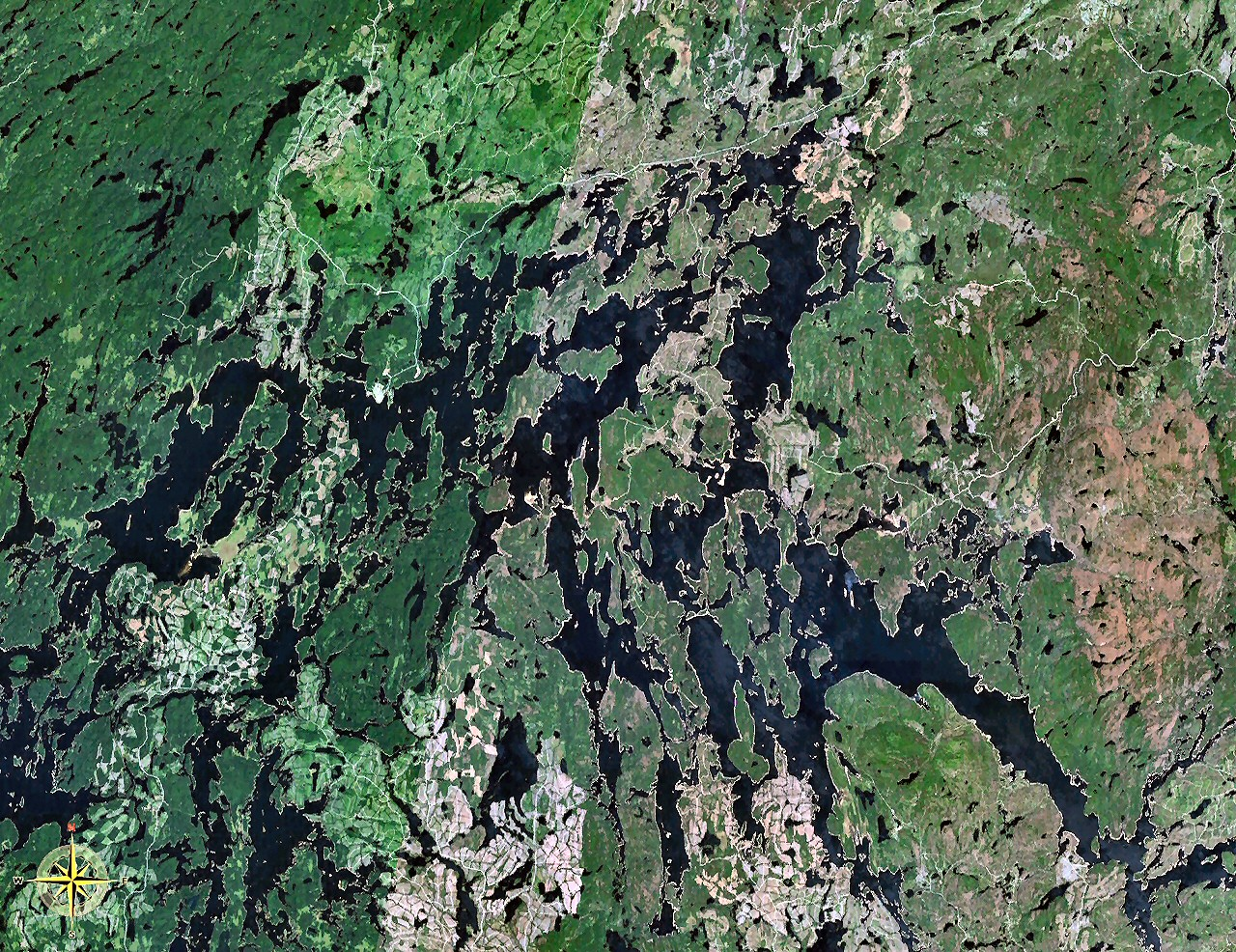
- Map of Gouin Reservoir seen from space

Location
- Country: Canada
- Province: Quebec
- Region: Mauricie

Physical characteristics
- Source: Machinila Lake
  - location: La Tuque, Mauricie, Quebec
  - coordinates: 48°09′41″N 74°10′20″W
  - elevation: 500 m (1,600 ft)
- Mouth: Gouin Reservoir
  - location: La Tuque, Mauricie, Quebec
  - coordinates: 48°17′47″N 74°13′50″W
  - elevation: 402 m (1,319 ft)
- Length: 23.4 km (14.5 mi)

Basin features
- Tributaries
  - left: (upstream); Outlet of lake Peter and tributariesKdu Moineau, de la Statue and Paludeen; outlet of lakes des Anophèles and Vert; outlet of lake Fern; outlet of lakes Belhumeux and Tiros.
  - right: (upstream); Outlet of Lake Youkata; outlet of lakes du Sud, Blois, Téléjac, Épistakis, Kariba and Grégoire; outlet of lake Bouleau; outlet of lake des Quinze and its tributaries.

The Jean-Pierre River is a tributary of the Jean-Pierre Bay, on the south shore of the Gouin Reservoir, flowing into the territory of the town of La Tuque, into the administrative region of Mauricie, in Quebec, in Canada.

The Jean-Pierre River flows successively into the townships of Dansereau, Bureau and Leblanc, south of the Gouin Reservoir and on the west side of the upper Saint-Maurice River. Forestry is the main economic activity of this valley; recreational tourism activities, second.

The route 405, connecting the Gouin Dam to the village of Wemotaci, Quebec by the west bank of the Saint-Maurice River, serves the Jean-Pierre River Valley and also the peninsula that stretches north on 30.1 kilometres (18.7 mi) in the Gouin Reservoir. Some secondary forest roads are in use nearby for forestry and recreational tourism activities.

The surface of the Jean-Pierre River is usually frozen from mid-November to the end of April, however, safe ice circulation is generally from early December to late March.

== Geography ==
The adjacent hydrographic slopes of the Jean-Pierre River are:
- north side: Gouin Reservoir, Kikendatch Bay, Au Vison River, Brochu Lake, Wapous River;
- east side: Kikendatch Bay, Saint-Maurice River, Cypress River;
- south side: Norah Creek, Najoua Creek, Saint-Maurice River, Huot River, Manouane River (La Tuque);
- west side: Leblanc River, Five Mile Lake, Kettle Bay, Chapman Lake (Gouin Reservoir), Gouin Reservoir.

The Jean-Pierre River originates at the mouth of Machinila Lake (length: 0.5 kilometres (0.31 mi); altitude: 500 metres (1,600 ft)). The mouth of this lake head is located at:

- 4.2 kilometres (2.6 mi) south-east of the mouth of the Jean-Pierre River (confluence with Jean-Pierre Bay of Gouin Reservoir);
- 22.0 kilometres (13.7 mi) south of the dam at the mouth of the Gouin Reservoir (confluence with the Saint-Maurice River);
- 40.9 kilometres (25.4 mi) north-east of the village center of Wemotaci, Quebec which is located along the Saint-Maurice River;
- 132 kilometres (82 mi) north-west of downtown La Tuque.

From the mouth of the head lake, the course of the Jean-Pierre River flows over 23.4 kilometres (14.5 mi) according to the following segments:

- 5.1 kilometres (3.2 mi) north-east, then north across Lac Jean-Pierre (length: 2.3 kilometres (1.4 mi); altitude: 474 metres (1,555 ft)) on its full length, to its mouth. Note: Lake Jean-Pierre straddles the townships of Dansereau and Bureau;
- 3.3 kilometres (2.1 mi) north across Lake Sylvain (length: 1.0 kilometre (0.62 mi); altitude: 474 metres (1,555 ft)) on its full length, then the Minister's Lake (length: 3.9 kilometres (2.4 mi); altitude: 465 metres (1,526 ft)) on 1.8 kilometres (1.1 mi), to its mouth;
- 4.0 kilometres (2.5 mi) northwesterly to the mouth of Lake Peter (length: 2.9 kilometres (1.8 mi); altitude: 425 metres (1,394 ft)) that the current crosses over a hundred meters;
- 3.2 kilometres (2.0 mi) north-east between the mountains, to the outlet of South Lake (coming from the East);
- 7.4 kilometres (4.6 mi) southwesterly, passing between two mountains, cutting a forest road, then crossing a lake (length: 3.5 kilometres (2.2 mi); altitude: 413 metres (1,355 ft)) formed by a widening of the river, to the eastern limit of the township of Leblanc;
- 0.4 kilometres (0.25 mi) northwesterly in the Township of Leblanc to its mouth.

The confluence of the "Jean-Pierre River" with the Gouin Reservoir is located at:

- 11.7 kilometres (7.3 mi) south-west of Gouin Dam;
- 66.4 kilometres (41.3 mi) south-east of the village center of Obedjiwan, Quebec;
- 56.0 kilometres (34.8 mi) northwest of the village center of Wemotaci, Quebec;
- 144.7 kilometres (89.9 mi) north-west of downtown La Tuque;
- 251 kilometres (156 mi) northwest of the mouth of the Saint-Maurice River (confluence with the St. Lawrence River at Trois-Rivières).
The Jean-Pierre River flows on the eastern shore of Jean-Pierre Bay (length: 7.9 kilometres (4.9 mi) advancing south), straddling the townships of Aubin and Leblanc. From this mouth, the current flows northward on 7.4 kilometres (4.6 mi) through Jean-Pierre Bay; then, the current flows eastward on 12.0 kilometres (7.5 mi) across the Kikendatch Bay to the Gouin Dam. From there, the current flows along the Saint-Maurice River to Trois-Rivières, where it flows on the North Shore of the St. Lawrence River.

== Toponymy ==
The term "Jean-Pierre" is a first name of French origin.

The toponym "Rivière Jean-Pierre" was officialized on December 5, 1968, at the Commission de toponymie du Québec.

== See also ==
- Saint-Maurice River
- Gouin Reservoir, a body of water
- Kikendatch Bay
- La Tuque, a city
- Haute-Mauricie, a territory corresponding to the town of La Tuque
- List of rivers of Quebec
