= Bazin River =

Bazin
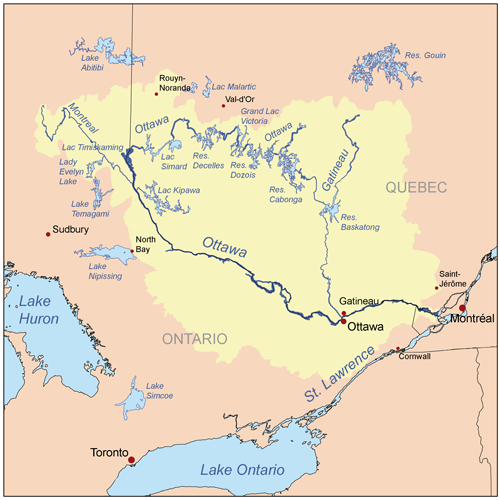
- Map of Ottawa River watershed

Location
- Country: Canada
- Province: Quebec
- Region: Mauricie and Laurentides

Physical characteristics
- Source: Ours Blanc Lake
  - location: La Tuque, Mauricie, Quebec
  - coordinates: 48°02′02″N 74°33′44″W
  - elevation: 435 m (1,427 ft)
- Mouth: Gatineau River
  - location: Lac-Oscar (RCM Antoine-Labelle), Laurentides, Quebec
  - coordinates: 48°28′42″N 75°22′01″W
  - elevation: 287 m (942 ft)
- Length: 124 km (77 mi)

Basin features
- Progression: Gatineau→ Ottawa→ St. Lawrence→ Gulf of St. Lawrence
- Tributaries
  - left: (upstream); Outlet of lake Saint-Denis; Nasigon River; outlet of lake Tesson; Reed Creek; outlet of lake Margo; D'Amour Creek;Fox Creek; Bow Creek; Elbow Creek; Pierrot Creek; Dandurand River; outlet of lake Thérèse.
  - right: (upstream); outlet of lake Paterson; outlet of lake Triplet; Aux Bleuets River; Du Vison Creek; outlet of lake Lambry; De la Sauterelle Creek; De l'Épinette Creek; Baptiste Creek; Landry Creek; Pitchpine Creek; À la Marte River; outlet of lake Arnould.

The Bazin River is a river in Quebec, Canada, that flows from the La Tuque area of the La Tuque administrative authority of Mauricie to the Gatineau River in the unorganized territory of Lac-Oscar, in the regional county municipality of Antoine-Labelle, in Laurentides.

== Geography ==
The Bazin River begins at Lac-l'Ours-Blanc at an elevation of 435 metres (1,427 ft) in the territory of La Tuque in Haute-Mauricie. This lake of 4.5 kilometres (2.8 mi) has three zones. The mouth of the lake is located southeast of the southern zone. The river runs south across a marsh zone to the north shore of Raoul Lake, where the current flows through 2.9 kilometres (1.8 mi). Then the river flows south for 2.4 kilometres (1.5 mi) to the northeast shore of Lake Tremblay (along 8.1 kilometres (5.0 mi)) which bypasses the village of Parent heading west to a series of rapids. From there, the river flows west to meet the Marte River (coming from the north). Then the Bazin River branches off to the south, collecting Pitchpine Brook (coming from the west).

The Bazin River, which runs for 124 kilometres (77 mi), meanders in the forest, at first to the south. On its route, the river expands to include the lakes Raoul and Du-Tremblay. Then, it turns west near (north) of Parent. Then the route reorients itself to the south, then to the southwest. The Bazin River terminates in the Gatineau River, at 27 kilometres (17 mi) northwest of Judge Bay of Mitchinamecus Reservoir after passing through the Mocassin Rapids.

== Toponymy ==
The Bazin River flows through the canton of Bazin. This toponym evokes the memory of the French writer René Bazin (1853–1932). In the spring of 1912, Bazin arrived in Quebec as part of the Champlain Mission. He continued his stay in Quebec for the participation in the first congress of the French language in Canada which took place in June 1912. Bazin discovers the architectural beauty of Quebec City, overlooking "The most beautiful water crossroads of the world." The writer pays tribute to the rural population of the province.

In an article on September 1, 1912, published by the Revue des deux Mondes, Bazin tells the story of his trip to Quebec City. As early as 1884, Bazin had treated Canada in his novel Aunt Giron. In 1910, in a book called La Douce France, Bazin tries to excite the nationalist fiber of young French people. His work was widely read in Canada-French, especially in the classical colleges of the time.

The name "Bazin River" has been on map documents since 1929. Previously, the river was known as the "Gatineau North East River" (1908) or simply "Gatineau River" (1914).

The place name Bazin River was formalized on December 5, 1968, at the Bank of Place Names of the Commission de toponymie du Québec.

== See also ==
- La Tuque, a city
- Parent, a municipality
- Gatineau River, a watercourse
- Antoine-Labelle, a regional county municipality
- List of rivers of Quebec
