= Parent, Quebec =

Parent
- Former village
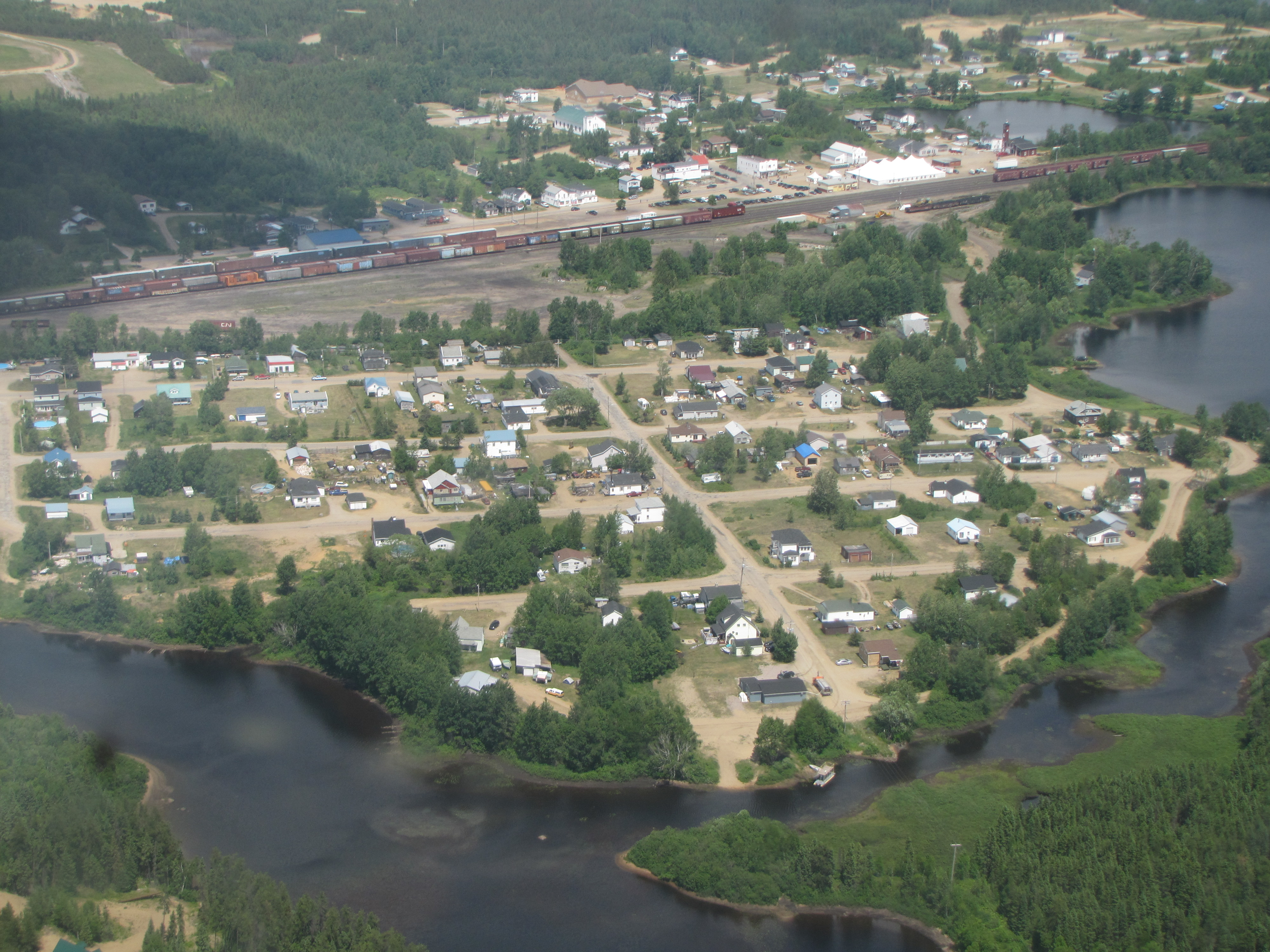

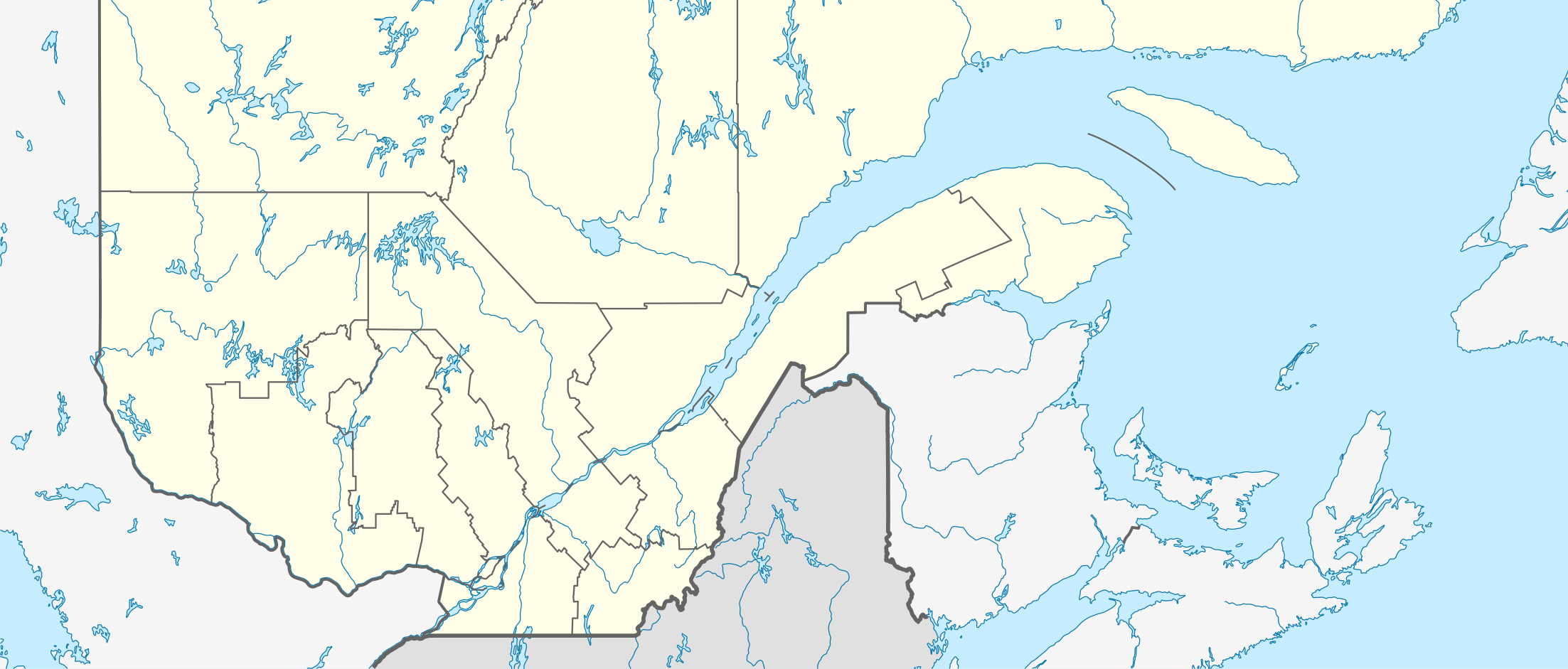
- Location within Quebec South
- Coordinates: 47°55′00″N 74°37′00″W
- Country: Canada
- Province: Quebec
- Region: Mauricie
- Municipality: La Tuque
- Settled: 1910

Area
  - Total: 41 km^{2} (16 sq mi)
- Elevation 1400: 434 m (1,424 ft)

Population (2021)^{[1]}
  - Total: 455
- Time zone: UTC-5 (EST)
  - Summer (DST): UTC-4 (EDT)
- Postal code: G0X 3P0
- Area code: (819) 667

Parent is a community in northern Quebec, Canada, located within the city of La Tuque and about 150 kilometres (93 mi) north-west of La Tuque's town centre. In 2021, it had a population of 455.

During the summer, it becomes the supply point for several dozen outfitters, and in the winter it is a major centre for the snowmobile industry. The Arbec sawmill, with 150 workers, is the main employer of the region. The Bazin River that flows through town is popular for 5- to 7-day canoe trips that end at the Gatineau River.

== History ==
Parent was founded in 1910 when the National Transcontinental Railway was built through the area. It was named after Simon-Napoléon Parent, Québec Premier from 1900 to 1905 and Chairman of the Board of Transcontinental Railway from 1905 to 1911. In 1913, the Parish of Saint-Thomas was formed and two years later in 1915, the Parent Post Office opened.

In 1947, the Village Municipality of Parent was established. The town was the site of a Pinetree Line radar site (RCAF Station Parent) from 1954 to 1963.

On March 26, 2003, Le Haut-Saint-Maurice Regional County Municipality was dissolved and all its municipalities and unorganized territories, including Parent, were amalgamated into the new city of La Tuque.
