= List of census-designated places in Wisconsin =

Map of the United States with Wisconsin highlighted

This article lists census-designated places (CDPs) in the U.S. state of Wisconsin. As of 2018, there were a total of 177 census-designated places in Wisconsin, down from 179 in the 2010 Census. Lake Shangrila and Pell Lake were annexed by Bristol and Bloomfield in 2011, respectively. Windsor incorporated in 2015.

== Census-designated places ==
CDP	Population	County
Abrams	358	Oconto
Allens Grove	174	Walworth
Allenton	859	Washington
Alto	166	Fond du Lac
Amberg	147	Marinette
Angelica	94	Shawano
Argonne	135	Forest
Arkansaw	194	Pepin
Arkdale	201	Adams
Ashippun	1,166	Dodge
Babcock	122	Wood
Baileys Harbor	334	Door
Bancroft	526	Portage
Barronett	103	Barron
Batavia	242	Sheboygan
Bayfront	113	Ashland
Big Foot Prairie	22	Walworth
Birch Hill	295	Ashland
Bluffview	536	Sauk
Bohners Lake	2,374	Racine
Boulder Junction	179	Vilas
Brice Prairie	1,961	La Crosse
Briggsville	316	Marquette
Brothertown	201	Calumet
Browns Lake	1,879	Racine
Brule	208	Douglas
Burnett	220	Dodge
Butte des Morts	1,005	Winnebago
Cable	177	Bayfield
Caroline	236	Shawano
Cataract	220	Monroe
Ceex Haci	89	Wood
Chain O' Lakes	1,124	Waupaca
Chelsea	106	Taylor
Chief Lake	582	Sawyer
Chili	205	Clark
Clam Lake	36	Ashland
Clarks Mills	149	Manitowoc
Collins	203	Manitowoc
Como	2,356	Walworth
Cornucopia	103	Bayfield
Dale	570	Outagamie
Dalton	215	Green Lake
Danbury	165	Burnett
Dekorra	255	Columbia
Delavan Lake	2,803	Walworth
Dellwood	579	Adams
Diamond Bluff	184	Pierce
Diaperville	67	Ashland
Dodge	121	Trempealeau
Downsville	188	Dunn
Drummond	169	Bayfield
Dunbar	61	Marinette
Dyckesville	490	Brown and Kewaunee
Eagle Lake	1,251	Racine
Easton	86	Adams
Edmund	129	Iowa
Elcho	327	Langlade
Ellison Bay	249	Door
Emerald	145	St. Croix
Eureka	247	Winnebago
Florence	641	Florence
Forest Junction	746	Calumet
Franks Field	160	Ashland
French Island	4,284	La Crosse
Fulton	117	Rock
Gibbsville	486	Sheboygan
Gilmanton	155	Buffalo
Glen Haven	64	Grant
Glidden	437	Ashland
Goodman	241	Marinette
Gordon	145	Douglas
Gotham	189	Richland
Grand Marsh	110	Adams
Grand View	117	Bayfield
Greenbush	159	Sheboygan
Greenleaf	733	Brown
Green Valley	110	Shawano
Hager City	357	Pierce
Hanover	179	Rock
Harrisville	90	Marquette
Hatfield	176	Jackson
Hebron	209	Jefferson
Helenville	238	Jefferson
Herbster	130	Bayfield
Hingham	899	Sheboygan
Holcombe	239	Chippewa
Houlton	377	St. Croix
Humbird	254	Clark
Iron Belt	158	Iron
Iron River	768	Bayfield
Ixonia	2,367	Jefferson
Jim Falls	231	Chippewa
Jolmaville	126	Ashland
Juda	340	Green
Jump River	53	Taylor
Keshena	1,257	Menominee
Kieler	557	Grant
King	1,242	Waupaca
Knowlton	94	Marathon
Krakow	378	Oconto and Shawano
Lac du Flambeau	1,845	Vilas
Lake Arrowhead	946	Adams
Lake Camelot	895	Adams
Lake Ivanhoe	461	Walworth
Lake Koshkonong	1,239	Jefferson
Lake Lorraine	338	Walworth
Lake Ripley	1,911	Jefferson
Lake Sherwood	357	Adams
Lake Tomahawk	246	Oneida
Lake Wazeecha	3,107	Wood
Lake Wisconsin	4,616	Columbia and Sauk
Lake Wissota	2,830	Chippewa
Lakewood	241	Oconto
Laona	519	Forest
Lauderdale Lakes	1,283	Walworth
Lebanon	187	Dodge
Legend Lake	1,670	Menominee
Leopolis	86	Shawano
Lewis	87	Polk
Lily Lake	508	Kenosha
Little Round Lake	1,242	Sawyer
Little Sturgeon	177	Door
Long Lake	59	Florence
Lyons	932	Walworth
Marengo	148	Ashland
Mercer	551	Iron
Middle Village	290	Menominee and Shawano
Millston	113	Jackson
Mindoro	291	La Crosse
Minocqua	411	Oneida
Mission	297	Jackson
Mole Lake	535	Forest
Mountain	289	Oconto
Navarino	177	Shawano
Neopit	616	Menominee
New Munster	286	Kenosha
New Odanah	466	Ashland
New Post	302	Sawyer
Newald	70	Forest
North Lake	247	Waukesha
Northport	459	Waupaca
Odanah	47	Ashland
Ogema	188	Price
Okauchee Lake	5,094	Waukesha
Paac Ciinak	83	Shawano
Packwaukee	242	Marquette
Pella	207	Shawano
Pembine	188	Marinette
Pence	123	Iron
Pine River	144	Waushara
Polonia	565	Portage
Port Wing	156	Bayfield
Post Lake	343	Langlade
Potter Lake	1,117	Walworth
Powers Lake	1,401	Kenosha
Poy Sippi	379	Waushara
Pulcifer	131	Shawano
Reserve	349	Sawyer
Rib Mountain	6,061	Marathon
Rock Falls	160	Dunn
Rome	752	Jefferson
Rubicon	235	Dodge
St. Joseph	387	La Crosse
St. Peter	1,642	Fond du Lac
Sand Pillow	262	Jackson
Sandy Hook	293	Grant
Saxon	75	Iron
Sayner	231	Vilas
Seneca	226	Crawford
Sextonville	476	Richland
Seymour	1,501	Eau Claire
Shopiere	154	Rock
Sobieski	275	Oconto
Springbrook	89	Washburn
Springfield	168	Walworth
Stone Lake	186	Sawyer and Washburn
Summit Lake	141	Langlade
Tainter Lake	2,550	Dunn
Taycheedah	643	Fond du Lac
Thornton	63	Shawano
Three Lakes	605	Oneida
Tichigan	5,277	Racine
Tilleda	71	Shawano
Townsend	179	Oconto
Trego	187	Washburn
Tunnel City	100	Monroe
Turtle Lake	348	Walworth
Tustin	120	Waushara
Van Dyne	292	Fond du Lac
Wabeno	453	Forest
Waubeka	640	Ozaukee
Waukau	302	Winnebago
Waumandee	62	Buffalo
Westboro	213	Taylor
Whittlesey	97	Taylor
Winchester	649	Winnebago
Wind Lake	5,355	Racine
Wiota	71	Lafayette
Woodford	71	Lafayette
Woodruff	891	Oneida
Zoar	107	Menominee

== See also ==
- List of cities in Wisconsin
- List of counties in Wisconsin
- List of municipalities in Wisconsin by population
- List of towns in Wisconsin
- List of villages in Wisconsin
