= Sanborn, Wisconsin =

- Town
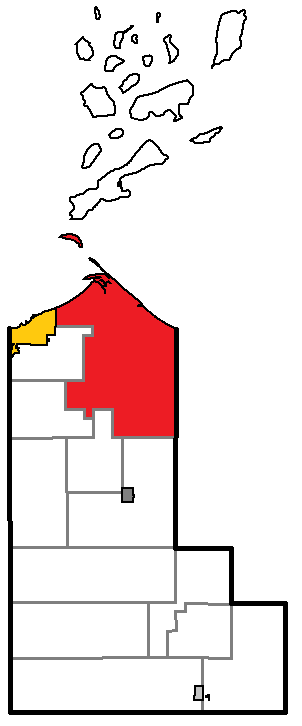
- Location of Sanborn, within Ashland County, Wisconsin
- Coordinates: 46°32′29″N 90°40′19″W
- Country: United States
- State: Wisconsin
- County: Ashland
- Founded: March 23, 1899
- Named for: Senator A.W. Sanborn

Area
  - Total: 161.0 sq mi (416.9 km^{2})
  - Land: 157.1 sq mi (406.9 km^{2})
  - Water: 3.9 sq mi (10.0 km^{2})
- Elevation: 735 ft (224 m)

Population (2020)
  - Total: 1,381
  - Density: 8.790/sq mi (3.394/km^{2})
- Time zone: UTC-6 (Central (CST))
  - Summer (DST): UTC-5 (CDT)
- Area codes: 715 & 534
- FIPS code: 55-71350
- GNIS feature ID: 1584096
- Website: https://townofsanborn.com/

Sanborn is a town in Ashland County in the U.S. state of Wisconsin. The population was 1,381 at the 2020 census. The unincorporated communities of Bayfront, Birch, Birch Hill, Diaperville, Franks Field, New Odanah, Odanah, and Sedgwick are located in the town. Long Island, one of the Apostle Islands, is also a part of the town. The entire town is part of the Bad River Reservation of the Bad River Band of the Lake Superior Tribe of Chippewa Indians.

== History ==
The town was created on March 23, 1899, and supposedly named after Senator Albert W. Sanborn, a member of the Wisconsin State Senate, who held a large area of land in the vicinity.

== Geography ==
Sanborn is located in northern Ashland County, along the shore of Lake Superior. It is bordered by the city of Ashland and the town of Gingles to the west, by the town of White River to the west and the south, and by the towns of Ashland and Morse to the south. To the east are the towns of Gurney and Saxon in Iron County. The town of La Pointe occupies the Apostle Islands in Lake Superior, to the north.

The Bad River flows south to north through the town, entering Lake Superior northeast of the community of Odanah. U.S. Route 2 crosses the town, leading west to downtown Ashland and east to Ironwood, Michigan.

According to the United States Census Bureau, the town has a total area of 161.0 square miles (416.9 km^{2}), of which 157.1 square miles (406.9 km^{2}) is land and 3.9 square miles (10.0 km^{2}), or 2.40%, is water.

== Demographics ==
Historical population
Census	Pop.	Note	%±
1900	1,270		—
1910	325		−74.4%
1920	396		21.8%
1930	1,001		152.8%
1940	1,310		30.9%
1950	998		−23.8%
1960	618		−38.1%
1970	662		7.1%
1980	834		26.0%
1990	998		19.7%
2000	1,272		27.5%
2010	1,331		4.6%
2020	1,381		3.8%
U.S. Decennial Census

As of the census of 2000, there were 1,272 people, 428 households, and 321 families residing in the town. The population density was 8.1 people per square mile (3.1/km^{2}). There were 531 housing units at an average density of 3.4 per square mile (1.3/km^{2}). The racial makeup of the town was 12.97% White, 84.51% Native American, 0.08% Asian, 0.16% from other races, and 2.28% from two or more races. Hispanic or Latino of any race were 3.22% of the population.

There were 428 households, out of which 43.0% had children under the age of 18 living with them, 32.5% were married couples living together, 30.6% had a female householder with no husband present, and 24.8% were non-families. 21.0% of all households were made up of individuals, and 6.5% had someone living alone who was 65 years of age or older. The average household size was 2.97 and the average family size was 3.39.

In the town, the population was spread out, with 38.8% under the age of 18, 7.6% from 18 to 24, 28.0% from 25 to 44, 19.9% from 45 to 64, and 5.7% who were 65 years of age or older. The median age was 29 years. For every 100 females, there were 98.8 males. For every 100 females age 18 and over, there were 86.8 males.

The median income for a household in the town was $26,711, and the median income for a family was $27,625. Males had a median income of $25,150 versus $20,272 for females. The per capita income for the town was $11,664. About 23.7% of families and 27.4% of the population were below the poverty line, including 40.8% of those under age 18 and 5.9% of those age 65 or over.
