= Shanagolden =

Shanagolden may refer to:

== Places ==
Ireland

- Shanagolden, County Limerick, a village

United States

- Shanagolden, Wisconsin, town
- Shanagolden (community), Wisconsin, unincorporated community
