= Peeksville =

Peeksville may refer to:

== Places ==
=== United States ===
- Peeksville, Georgia
- Peeksville, Wisconsin
- Peeksville (community), Wisconsin
