= Kakagon Sloughs =

Coordinates: 46.662191°N 90.741026°W

Designations

U.S. National Natural Landmark
- Designated: 1973

Ramsar Wetland
- Official name: Kakagon and Bad River Sloughs
- Designated: 2 February 2012
- Reference no.: 2001

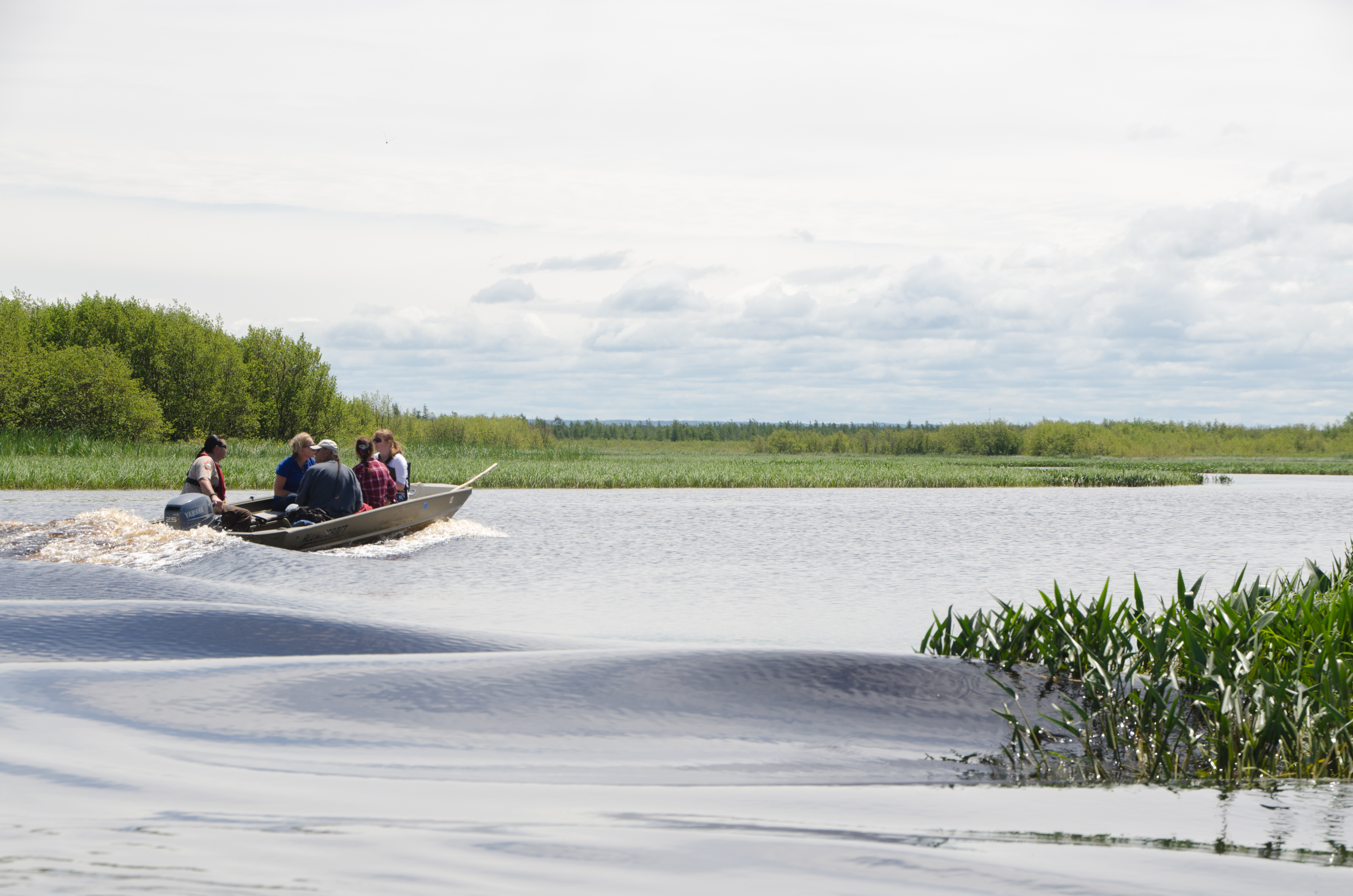
Boaters on Kakagon Sloughs, July 2014

The Kakagon Sloughs are a number of tributaries that flow into Chequamegon Bay and Lake Superior in Ashland County, Wisconsin. Species of fish found in the sloughs include the northern pike, walleye, panfish, and smallmouth bass. This wetland includes a variety of species of seasonal waterfowl including the Wood Duck, Mallard, Blue-winged Teal, Bufflehead, Coot, as well as year-long Midwestern aves. It is maintained by the Bad River Band of the Lake Superior Tribe of Chippewa Indians. The tradition of harvesting Wild Rice also known as, Manomin (Ojibwe), occurs in the late summer after the dormant rice beds arise during the summer months and are ripe for harvest come mid-August. Protecting this sacred region of the Great Lakes is pivotal in maintaining traditions for our youth to learn and continue, providing opportunities to harvest food year-round, as well as providing a stable ecosystem that affects the entirety of Lake Superior which correlates directly into the Great Lakes as a whole. The wetland was designated a National Natural Landmark in 1973. On February 2, 2012 it was designated a Ramsar Wetland of International Importance.
