= Morse (community), Wisconsin =

Morse, Wisconsin
- Unincorporated community
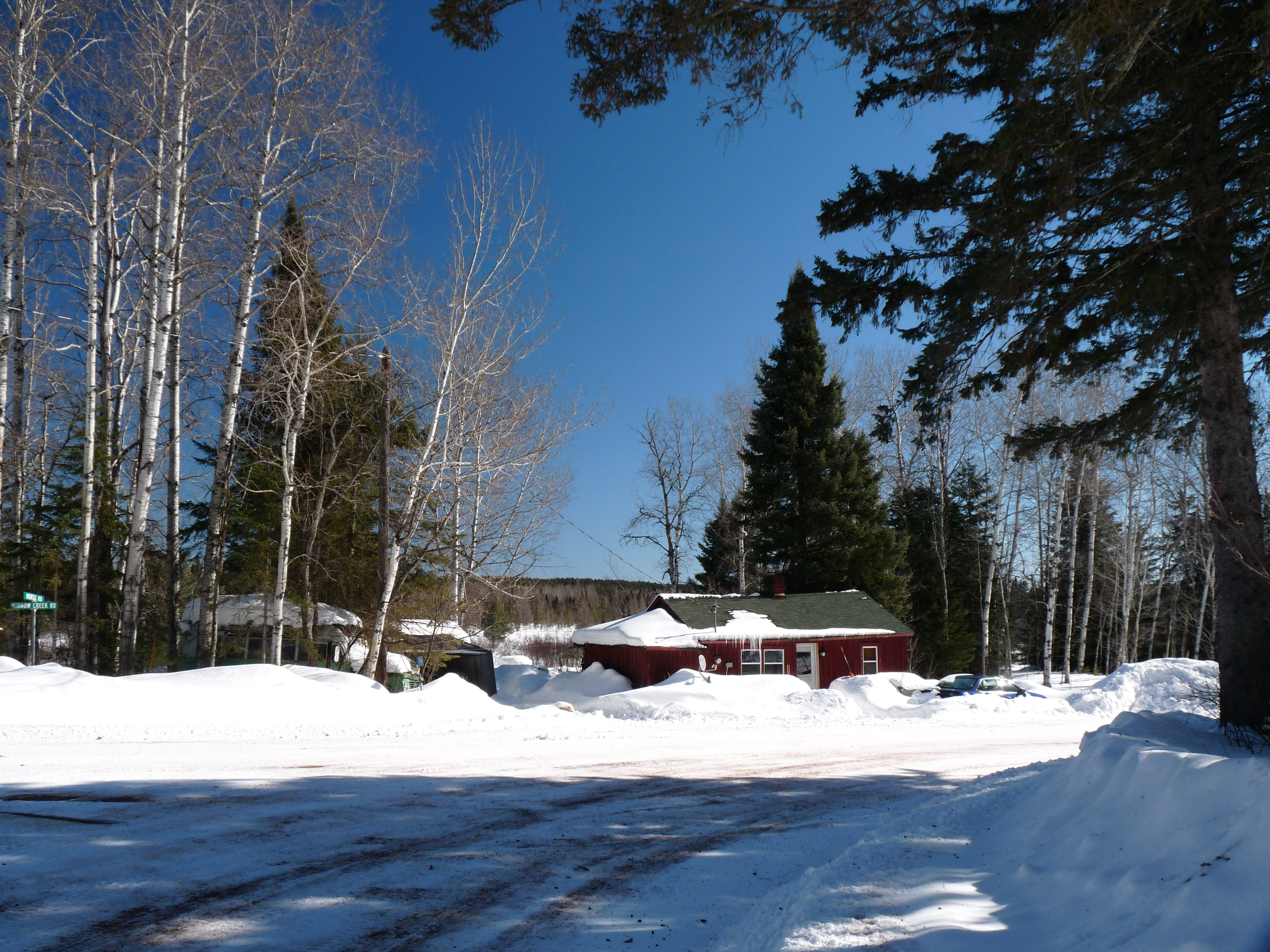

- Location within Wisconsin Location within the United States
- Coordinates: 46°13′20″N 90°37′40″W
- Country: United States
- State: Wisconsin
- County: Ashland
- Town: Gordon
- Elevation: 1,529 ft (466 m)
- Time zone: UTC-6 (Central (CST))
  - Summer (DST): UTC-5 (CDT)
- Area codes: 715 & 534
- GNIS feature ID: 1579920

Morse is an unincorporated community located in the town of Gordon, Ashland County, Wisconsin, United States. Morse is located along the Bad River, 7.5 miles (12.1 km) south-southeast of Mellen.

== History ==
In 1881 the newly formed Bad River Lumbering and Improvement Company began building a milltown where the Wisconsin Central Railroad line touched the Bad River. The town would later be named Morse, but it was initially called Jacob's Station, named after William H. Jacobs, the leader of the Bad River Company. At the same time they began improving a stretch of the Bad River for driving logs from their timber lands upstream to the mill. By next spring the company had completed the sawmill, a shingle and lath mill, a boarding house, a store, a blacksmith shop, and lumber sheds.

The mill began sawing in June 1882. That winter the company ran three logging camps out in their forests. In 1884 the mill employed 50 to 75 men and shipped out as many as five railcars of lumber a day. The town had added a hotel named the Bad River House, and in 1887 a schoolhouse.

In 1887 the company town and its holdings were purchased by the Penokee Lumber Company, an enterprise of some New York investors and Augustus W. Morse. Morse, from Saginaw, Michigan, was the local manager. Under his direction machinery was upgraded, the plant was reorganized, and he added electricity and a planing mill. To reduce the hazard of fire, scraps of wood were cleared from the mill's yard daily and large barrels of water stood watch. The mill kept about 70 Clydesdales in its stable. It was held up by the Northwestern Lumberman journal as a model mill. The town's name changed to Morse in 1889. Most of the lumber sawed in this period went west by rail to Omaha or east to Tonawanda, New York via the Wisconsin Central Railroad to Ashland and via ships on the Great Lakes. 275 men worked for the company and it provided twenty employee houses. All buildings, including the homes, were painted "Morse red."

In 1890 Penokee contracted to ship 3,000,000 feet of lumber to England. In the dry year of 1891 when the rivers were too low to drive logs, the mill ran out of logs and had to shut down for a while in the fall. In 1892, when millworkers went on strike along the Wisconsin River to reduce their work day to ten hours, the workers at Morse didn't strike, but the Penokee Lumber Company adopted the ten-hour day anyway. 600 people lived in Morse in 1895. Then Penokee Lumber shut down, possibly due to its timber running out, possibly a result of the Panic of 1893.

In 1900 F. B. Chase from Oshkosh bought the town and timber nearby and resumed logging and milling operations. But in 1903 a fire destroyed the sawmill. Many people moved away.

In 1917 the Kneeland-McClurg Lumber Company of Phillips began to use Morse as staging point for shipping logs to its sawmill in Phillips. Later it rebuilt a sawmill in Morse and built homes and a boarding house for the millworkers there. Population grew until the town had to expand the school. After Kneeland-McClurg left in the early 1930s, manufacturing was intermittent. In the early 1940s the Templetons used the old mill's kilns to manufacture cedar shingles. In 1946, Cohen and Carlson started making hampers and ladders. Today only a handful of buildings remain.
