= Birch, Ashland County, Wisconsin =

Birch, Wisconsin
- Unincorporated community
- Location within Wisconsin Location within the United States
- Coordinates: 46°32′18″N 90°34′32″W
- Country: United States
- State: Wisconsin
- County: Ashland
- Town: Sanborn
- Elevation: 860 ft (260 m)
- Time zone: UTC-6 (Central (CST))
  - Summer (DST): UTC-5 (CDT)
- Area codes: 715 & 534
- GNIS feature ID: 1577516

Birch is an unincorporated community located in the town of Sanborn, Ashland County, Wisconsin, United States. Birch is located along U.S. Route 2, on the Bad River Indian Reservation, 15.15 miles (24.38 km) east-southeast of Ashland.

Birch was so named because the original town site was a forest of white birch.
