= Holts Landing =

Holts Landing may refer to:

- Holts Landing, Wisconsin, an unincorporated community in Agenda, Ashland County, Wisconsin, United States
- Holts Landing State Park, a state park in Delaware in the United States
