= Agenda, Wisconsin =

- Town
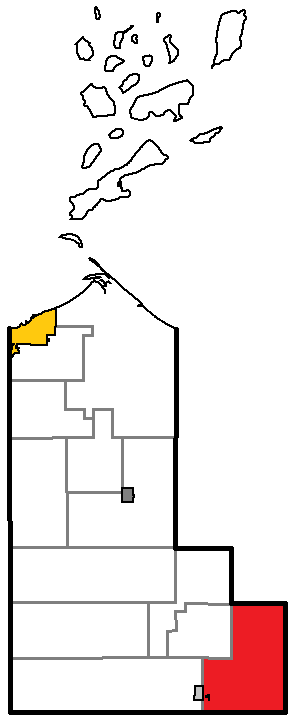
- Location of Agenda, within Ashland County, Wisconsin
- Coordinates: 46°4′46″N 90°22′55″W
- Country: United States
- State: Wisconsin
- County: Ashland

Area
  - Total: 89.5 sq mi (231.9 km^{2})
  - Land: 88.8 sq mi (230.0 km^{2})
  - Water: 0.73 sq mi (1.9 km^{2})
- Elevation: 1,610 ft (490 m)

Population (2020)
  - Total: 370
  - Density: 4.2/sq mi (1.6/km^{2})
- Time zone: UTC-6 (Central (CST))
  - Summer (DST): UTC-5 (CDT)
- Area codes: 715 & 534
- FIPS code: 55-00550
- GNIS feature ID: 1582660
- Website: https://www.townofagenda.com/

Agenda is a town in Ashland County in the U.S. state of Wisconsin. The population was 370 at the 2020 census, down from 422 at the 2010 census. The unincorporated communities of Holts Landing and Petes Landing are located in the town.

== History ==
The name for the town was derived from discussion items at a meeting for the formation of the town, called an “agenda”.

== Geography ==
Agenda occupies the southeast corner of Ashland County and is bordered by Iron County to the east and north and by Price County to the south. The towns of Chippewa and Peeksville and the village of Butternut are to the west. The Flambeau River, a major tributary of the Chippewa River, flows through the southeastern portion of the town.

According to the United States Census Bureau, the town of Agenda has a total area of 89.5 square miles (231.9 km^{2}), of which 88.8 square miles (230.0 km^{2}) is land and 0.73 square miles (1.9 km^{2}), or 0.83%, is water.

== Demographics ==
Historical population
Census	Pop.	Note	%±
1910	616		—
1920	740		20.1%
1930	844		14.1%
1940	743		−12.0%
1950	623		−16.2%
1960	528		−15.2%
1970	512		−3.0%
1980	623		21.7%
1990	591		−5.1%
2000	513		−13.2%
2010	422		−17.7%
2020	370		−12.3%
U.S. Decennial Census

As of the census of 2000, there were 513 people, 208 households, and 149 families residing in the town. The population density was 5.8 people per square mile (2.2/km^{2}). There were 328 housing units at an average density of 3.7 per square mile (1.4/km^{2}). The racial makeup of the town was 98.83% White, 0.19% African American, 0.19% Native American, and 0.78% from two or more races.

There were 208 households, out of which 27.9% had children under the age of 18 living with them, 64.4% were married couples living together, 5.3% had a female householder with no husband present, and 27.9% were non-families. 24.0% of all households were made up of individuals, and 12.5% had someone living alone who was 65 years of age or older. The average household size was 2.47 and the average family size was 2.93.

In the town, the population was spread out, with 21.4% under the age of 18, 7.2% from 18 to 24, 27.1% from 25 to 44, 26.9% from 45 to 64, and 17.3% who were 65 years of age or older. The median age was 42 years. For every 100 females, there were 116.5 males. For every 100 females age 18 and over, there were 107.7 males.

The median income for a household in the town was $37,857, and the median income for a family was $46,111. Males had a median income of $37,500 versus $18,750 for females. The per capita income for the town was $17,578. About 2.1% of families and 4.1% of the population were below the poverty line, including 4.2% of those under age 18 and 4.4% of those age 65 or over.
