= Bayfront, Wisconsin =

Census-designated place in Wisconsin, United States

- Census-designated place
- Location within Wisconsin Location within the United States
- Coordinates: 46°37′22″N 90°47′37″W
- Country: United States
- State: Wisconsin
- County: Ashland
- Town: Sanborn

Area
  - Total: 1.42 sq mi (3.69 km^{2})
  - Land: 1.42 sq mi (3.69 km^{2})
  - Water: 0 sq mi (0.0 km^{2})
- Elevation: 625 ft (191 m)

Population (2020)
  - Total: 113
- Time zone: UTC-6 (Central (CST))
  - Summer (DST): UTC-5 (CDT)
- ZIP Code: 54806 (Ashland)
- Area codes: 715/534
- FIPS code: 55-05387
- GNIS feature ID: 2813409

Bayfront is an unincorporated community and census-designated place (CDP) in Ashland County, Wisconsin, United States. As of the 2020 census, it had a population of 113.

Bayfront is in northern Ashland County, on the southeastern shore of Chequamegon Bay, an inlet of Lake Superior. The community is within the limits of the Bad River Reservation. Ashland, the county seat, is 5 miles (8 km) to the southwest.
