= Bad River Band of the Lake Superior Tribe of Chippewa Indians =

Indian tribe in Wisconsin, United States

Coordinates: 46°31′52″N 90°40′31″W

Bad River Lapointe Band of the Lake Superior Tribe of Chippewa Indians
Mashkii ziibii

Total population
- 6,945 (2010)

Regions with significant populations
- United States (Wisconsin)

Languages
- English, Ojibwe

Religion
- Catholicism, Methodism, Midewiwin

Related ethnic groups
- other Ojibwe, Odawa and Potawatomi

The Bad River LaPointe Band of the Lake Superior Tribe of Chippewa Indians or Bad River Tribe for short (Ojibwe: Mashkii ziibii) are a federally recognized tribe of Ojibwe people. The tribe had 6,945 members as of 2010. The Bad River Reservation is located on the south shore of Lake Superior and has a land area of about 193.11 square miles (500.15 km^{2}) in northern Wisconsin, straddling Ashland and Iron Counties. Odanah, the administrative and cultural center, is located 5 miles (8 km) east of the town of Ashland on U.S. Highway 2. The reservation population was 1,545 in 2020. Most of the reservation is managed as undeveloped forest and wetland, providing a habitat for wild rice and other natural resources.

== History ==
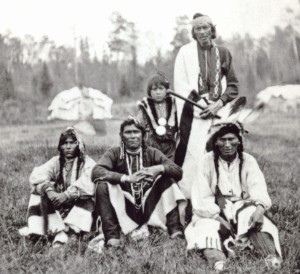
Historic photo of Ojibwe at Bad River

According to Anishinaabe prophecy, Gichi Manidoo, the Great Spirit, told the Anishinaabe people to move west from the Atlantic coast until they found the "food that grows on water." After a series of stops and divisions, the branch of Anishinaabe known as the Lake Superior Chippewa found wild rice near the Chequamegon Bay on the south shore of Lake Superior at the site of the present-day Bad River Lapointe Reservation. They made their final stopping place at nearby Madeline Island.

After the 17th century, Anishinaabe people settled throughout northern Wisconsin into lands formerly disputed with the Dakota Sioux and the Meskwaki. Those that remained near the trading post of La Pointe on Madeline Island were known collectively as the La Pointe Band; they engaged in the fur trade with neighboring French-Canadian settlers. They also pursued other seasonal occupations such as fishing, ricing, and hunting by men, and berry-picking, harvesting maple sugar, and gathering nuts, roots and medicinal plants by women.

After a disastrous attempt at removing the Lake Superior Bands in the 19th century, which resulted in the Sandy Lake Tragedy, the federal government agreed to set up permanent reservations in Wisconsin. At this point, the La Pointe band split: members who had converted to Roman Catholicism were led by Kechewaishke (Chief Buffalo) and took a reservation at Red Cliff. Those who maintained traditional Midewiwin beliefs settled at Bad River. The two bands, however, maintain close relations to this day.

The reservation land was set aside for the Bad River Lapointe Band in the Treaty of La Pointe, made with the US government and signed on Madeline Island on September 30, 1854. The treaty land included almost 2,000 acres (3.1 mi^{2}; 8.1 km^{2}) on Madeline Island, which is considered the center of the Ojibwe Nation. The band is one of six Ojibwe bands in present-day Wisconsin and one of eleven federally recognized tribes in the state.

In Odanah during the late 19th century, the Franciscan Sisters of Perpetual Adoration created St. Mary's School, an Indian boarding school. Students came from a variety of tribes to learn English and Western topics as well as Christianity. During this period, timber companies on the reservation leased land for lumbering, but they cheated the tribe of their leasing fees and destroyed much of the land by overlogging. During the Allotment period, the tribe leased almost half its land base, which originally covered all the area of modern-day Ashland, Wisconsin.

== Revival of sovereignty ==
Location of the Bad River Reservation in northern Wisconsin

As Lake Superior Ojibwe, the Bad River Lapointe Band retains its rights to hunt, fish, and gather wild rice, and medicinal plants within the ceded territory of northern Wisconsin, Michigan, and Minnesota. The tribe pressed these claims throughout the 20th century. Tribal members from Bad River and the other Lake Superior bands resumed their traditional practice of spear fishing, resulting in the Wisconsin Walleye War with recreational and sports fishermen.

In 1996, the Ojibwe activists the Anishinaabe Ogitchida blocked a railroad shipment of sulfuric acid from crossing the reservation; it was destined for a copper mine in Michigan. The protestors complained the acid posed an environmental danger to reservation lands and the Lake Superior watershed. The national attention brought by the protests forced the Environmental Protection Agency to stop the use of acid in the copper mine.

The headquarters of the Great Lakes Indian Fish & Wildlife Commission (GLIFWC) is on the Bad River Reservation. The tribe also owns and operates a fish hatchery, which stocks local rivers and lakes with 15 million walleye annually.

The Bad River Band of Lapoint Ojibwe own and operate on the reservation a casino as well as the Moccasin Trail gas station and grocery store complex. The tribe also runs a clinic, local transit, tribal school, daycare, and Head Start, as well as a volunteer fire department for its people. It has several community facilities: a tribal fire hall and youth center in the Birch Hill community, and a utility garage in the Franks Field community.

In 2014, the tribe announced it would not renew the lease on Madeline Island of the Amnicon Bay Association, composed of 18 non-native people. The 50-year lease, which began in 1967, ended in August 2017.

The Mashkiiziibii Natural Resources Department's task is to facilitate “the development of institutions of tribal self-governance to ensure the continued sovereignty of the Bad River Tribe in the regulation and management of its natural resources”. and has responded to numerous threats posed by Enbridge Line 5 pipeline.

== Reservation ==
The Bad River Reservation is primarily located on the south shore of Lake Superior and is nearly entirely covered by a forest and swamps. The reservation also includes a small area on the eastern tip of Madeline Island. Bad River is the largest Ojibwe reservation in Wisconsin and the second largest Indian reservation in the state, after the Menominee Indian Reservation. In Anishinaabemowin, they called the Anishinaabe people who lived around swamps Omashkiigowag ("Swampy people"), from mashkiig meaning "swamp". The people also go by Mashkigonaabeg, which means "Swampy-men:, where the suffix -naabe is "male" or "man" in the Anishinaabe language.

=== Geography ===
According to the U.S. Census Bureau, the reservation has a total area of 197.09 square miles (510.46 km^{2}), of which 193.11 square miles (500.16 km^{2}) is land and 3.98 square miles (10.3 km^{2}) is water. Less than 50% of the reservation land was tribally-owned as of 2010, with the remainder owned by individually by tribal members and outside purchasers due to historic allotment under the Dawes Act.

Sixteen thousand acres (25 mi^{2}; 65 km^{2}) of the reservation are high-quality wetlands due to the Kakagon Sloughs and Bad River sloughs; they are registered by the United States government as wetlands of international importance under the Ramsar Convention. The wetlands are ideal for the cultivation of wild rice, the historical crop of the Ojibwe. The sloughs constitute the only remaining extensive coastal wild rice marsh in the Great Lakes region. Due to its habitat and proximity to Madeline Island, Bad River is of major importance to the Ojibwe Nation. People from all over Ojibwe Country come for the annual August Celebration of the manoomin, or wild rice harvest.

On the northern border of the Reservation, the elevation tends to be between 600 and 700 feet (180 and 210 m) above sea level. To the south, the elevation increases to between 700 and 1,100 feet (210 and 340 m) above sea level. Scattered across the reservation are many small lakes.

=== Reservation demographics ===
As of the census of 2020, the population of the Bad River Reservation was 1,545. The population density was 8.0 inhabitants per square mile (3.1/km^{2}). There were 625 housing units at an average density of 3.2 per square mile (1.2/km^{2}). The racial makeup of the reservation was 76.1% Native American, 19.4% White, 0.3% Black or African American, 0.1% Pacific Islander, 0.1% from other races, and 4.0% from two or more races. Ethnically, the population was 4.3% Hispanic or Latino of any race.

Most people on the reservation live in one of four communities: Odanah (including New Odanah), Diaperville (also called Old Odanah), Birch Hill, or Frank's Field/Aspen Estates.

According to the American Community Survey estimates for 2016–2020, the median income for a household in the reservation was $51,458, and the median income for a family was $62,083. Male full-time workers had a median income of $36,389 versus $36,346 for female workers. The per capita income for the reservation was $22,694. About 13.0% of families and 21.1% of the population were below the poverty line, including 29.1% of those under age 18 and 15.0% of those age 65 or over. Of the population age 25 and over, 84.5% were high school graduates or higher and 11.7% had a bachelor's degree or higher.

=== Climate ===
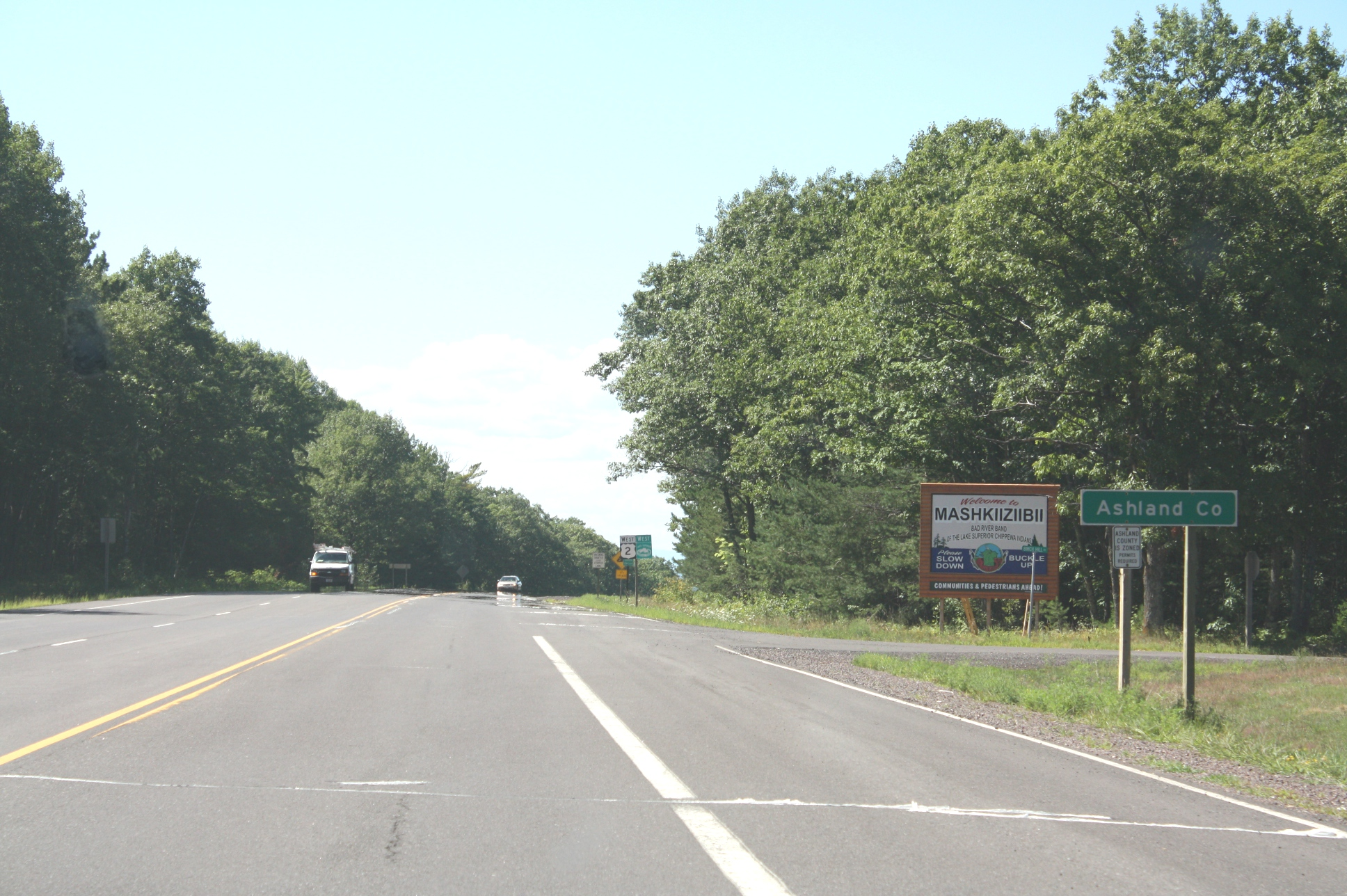
Wooded entrance to the reservation

Bad River Reservation has extreme climate conditions. Winters are long and cold, while summers are short and warm. The climate is largely affected by Lake Superior. Low temperatures during the cold winter months tend to average slightly above 0 °F (−18 °C). High temperatures during the cold winter months average above 20 °F (−7 °C). Average low temperatures during the summer months are near 50 and 55 °F (10 and 13 °C). Average high temperatures during the summer months are between 74 and 80 °F (23 and 27 °C). Precipitation is significant as a result of the extensive forest and Lake Superior. Average yearly precipitation is around 30 inches (760 mm).

== Notable members ==
- Lyle Mitchell Corbine Jr., filmmaker
- Wahsayah Whitebird, Ashland, WI city councillor and communist
- Trixie Mattel, musician, drag queen and social media influencer
- Anthony Rivera, Labor leader, federal law enforcement officer, public safety official and advocate.

== See also ==
- Great Lakes Indian Fish & Wildlife Commission
