= North York, Wisconsin =

- Unincorporated community
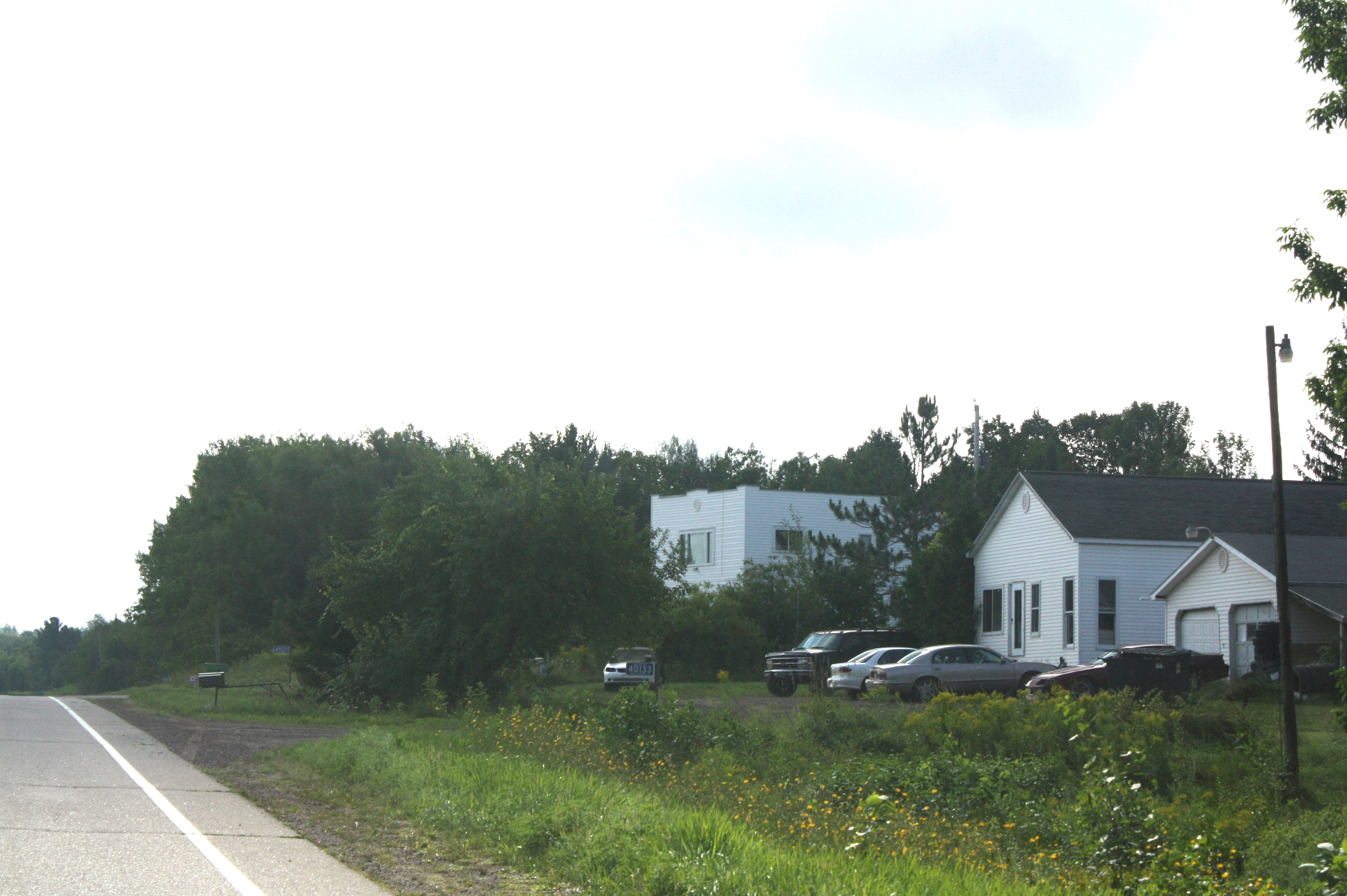
- Downtown North York

- Location within Wisconsin Location within the United States
- Coordinates: 46°23′34″N 90°46′40″W
- Country: United States
- State: Wisconsin
- County: Ashland
- Town: Ashland
- Elevation: 889 ft (271 m)
- Time zone: UTC-6 (Central (CST))
  - Summer (DST): UTC-5 (CDT)
- Area codes: 715 & 534
- GNIS feature ID: 1570521

North York is an unincorporated community located in the town of Ashland, Ashland County, Wisconsin, United States. It is situated on Wisconsin Highway 13.

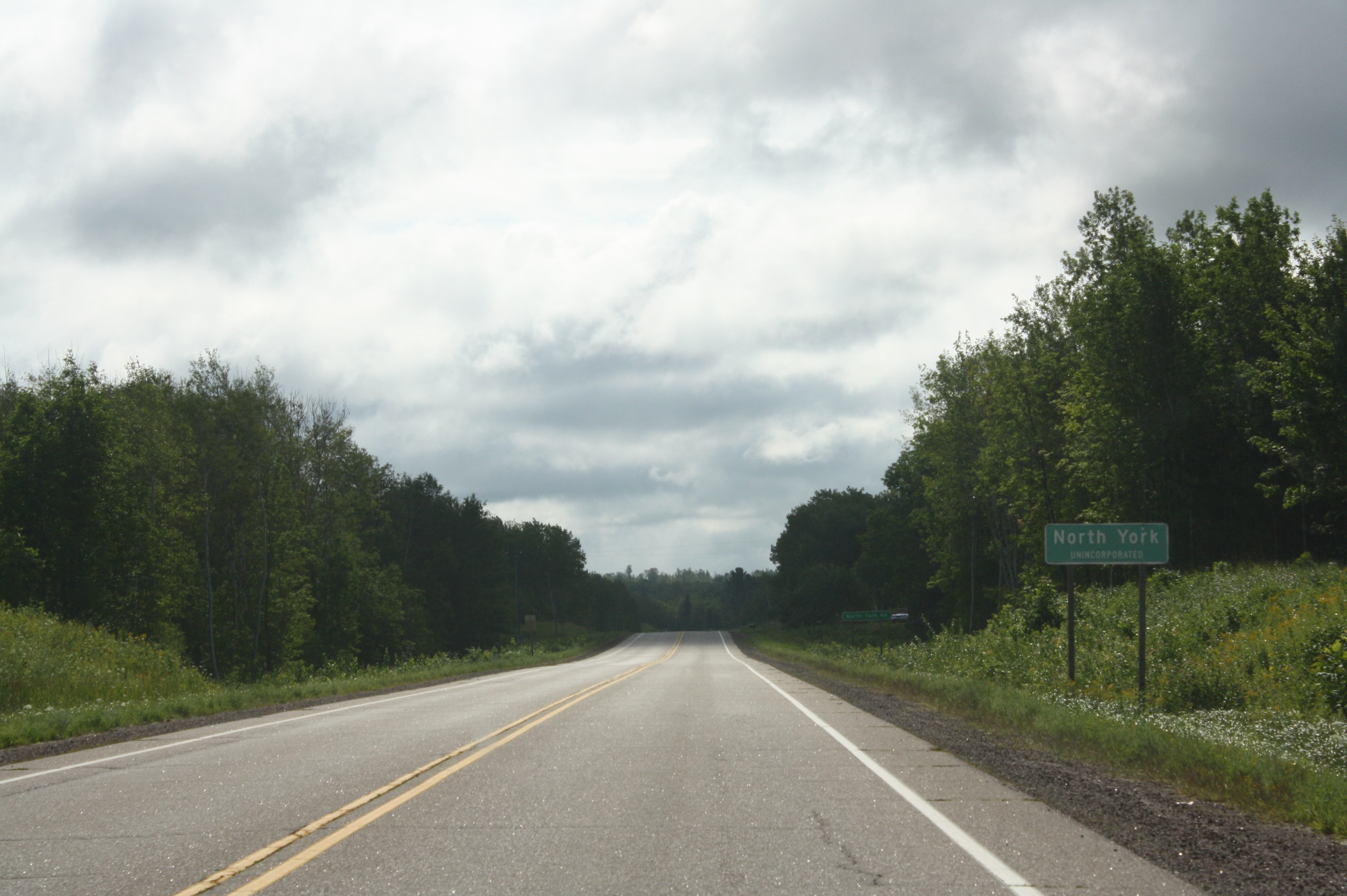
Sign for North York on WIS13
