= Woodruff (CDP), Wisconsin =

Census-designated place in Wisconsin, United States

Woodruff, Wisconsin
- Census-designated place
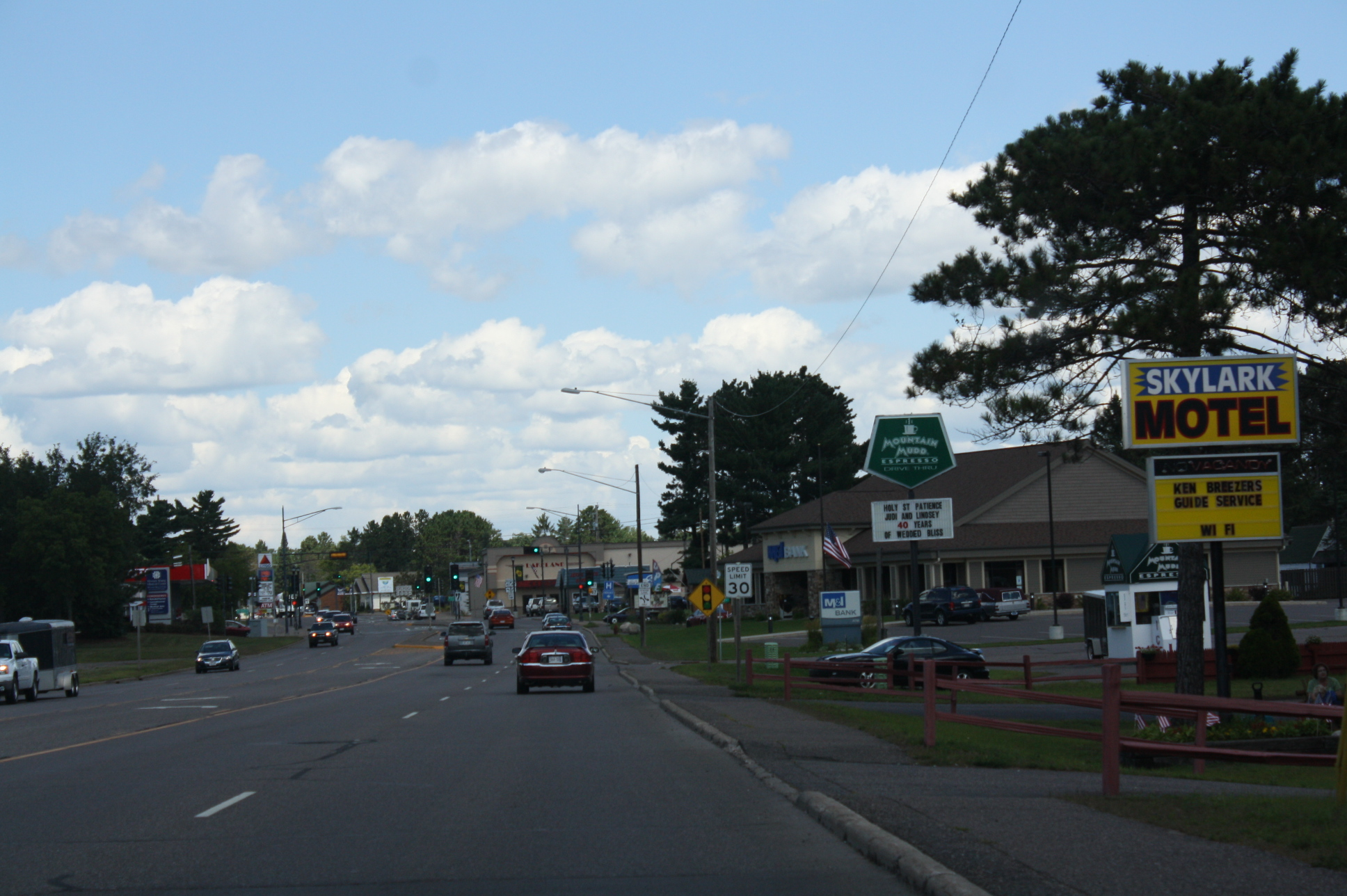
- Downtown Woodruff

- Location within Wisconsin
- Coordinates: 45°53′47″N 89°41′57″W
- Country: United States
- State: Wisconsin
- County: Oneida

Area
  - Total: 1.434 sq mi (3.71 km^{2})
  - Land: 1.409 sq mi (3.65 km^{2})
  - Water: 0.025 sq mi (0.065 km^{2})
- Elevation: 1,608 ft (490 m)

Population (2020)
  - Total: 891
  - Density: 632/sq mi (244/km^{2})
- Time zone: UTC-6 (Central (CST))
  - Summer (DST): UTC-5 (CDT)
- ZIP code: 54568
- Area codes: 715 & 534
- GNIS feature ID: 1577018

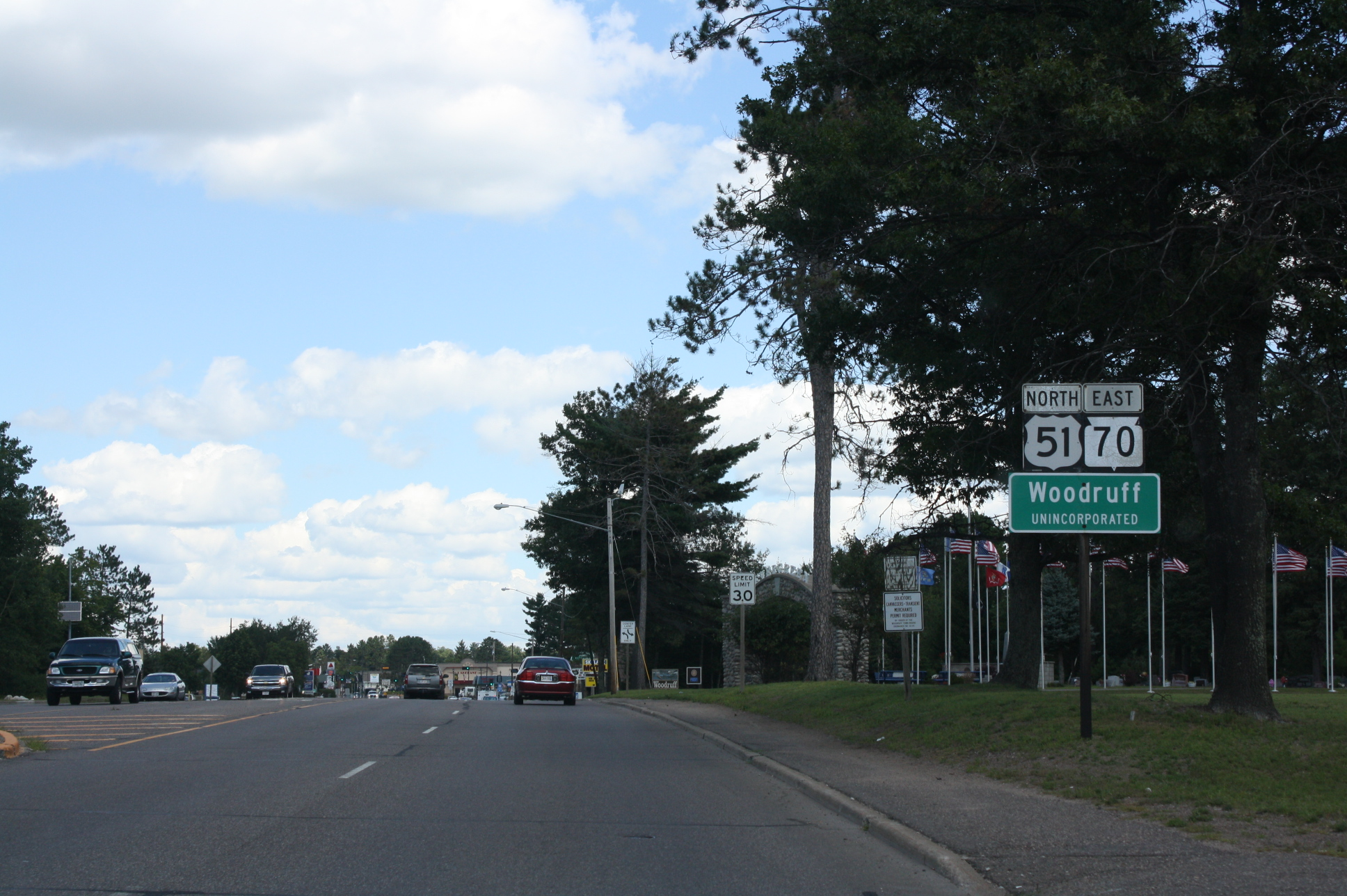
Woodruff sign on U.S. Route 51 / Wisconsin Highway 70

Woodruff is a census-designated place in the Town of Woodruff in Oneida County, Wisconsin, United States. As of the 2020 census, the population was 891.

== Description ==
Woodruff is located at the junction of U.S. Route 51, Wisconsin Highway 70 and Wisconsin Highway 47, 22.5 miles (36.2 km) northwest of Rhinelander. Woodruff has a post office with ZIP code 54568. As of the 2010 census, its population is 966. Woodruff has a hospital, the Howard Young Medical Center.

== See also ==
- List of census-designated places in Wisconsin
