= Gordon, Ashland County, Wisconsin =

Gordon, Wisconsin
- Town
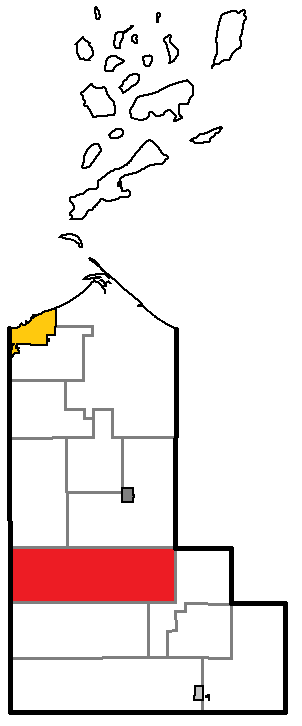
- Location of Gordon, within Ashland County, Wisconsin
- Coordinates: 46°12′32″N 90°43′41″W
- Country: United States
- State: Wisconsin
- County: Ashland
- Named after: Antoine Gordon

Area
  - Total: 107.0 sq mi (277.1 km^{2})
  - Land: 104.4 sq mi (270.5 km^{2})
  - Water: 2.5 sq mi (6.6 km^{2})
- Elevation: 1,519 ft (463 m)

Population (2020)
  - Total: 261
  - Density: 2.50/sq mi (0.965/km^{2})
- Time zone: UTC-6 (Central (CST))
  - Summer (DST): UTC-5 (CDT)
- Area codes: 715 & 534
- FIPS code: 55-29875
- GNIS feature ID: 1583291

Gordon is a town in Ashland County in the U.S. state of Wisconsin. The population was 261 at the 2020 census. The unincorporated communities of Clam Lake and Morse are located in the town.

== History ==
The town was named after Antoine Gordon, who was a fur trader from La Pointe, Wisconsin.

== Geography ==
According to the United States Census Bureau, the town has a total area of 107.0 square miles (277.1 km^{2}), of which 104.4 square miles (270.5 km^{2}) is land and 2.5 square miles (6.6 km^{2}), or 2.39%, is water.

== Demographics ==
Historical population
Census	Pop.	Note	%±
1900	231		—
1910	330		42.9%
1920	528		60.0%
1930	632		19.7%
1940	592		−6.3%
1950	411		−30.6%
1960	259		−37.0%
1970	312		20.5%
1980	333		6.7%
1990	301		−9.6%
2000	357		18.6%
2010	283		−20.7%
2020	261		−7.8%
U.S. Decennial Census

As of the census of 2000, there were 357 people, 155 households, and 104 families residing in the town. The population density was 3.4 people per square mile (1.3/km^{2}). There were 397 housing units at an average density of 3.8 per square mile (1.5/km^{2}). The racial makeup of the town was 97.76% White, 0.28% Native American, 0.56% Asian, 0.56% from other races, and 0.84% from two or more races. Hispanic or Latino of any race were 0.84% of the population.

There were 155 households, out of which 27.1% had children under the age of 18 living with them, 56.8% were married couples living together, 6.5% had a female householder with no husband present, and 32.9% were non-families. 28.4% of all households were made up of individuals, and 15.5% had someone living alone who was 65 years of age or older. The average household size was 2.30 and the average family size was 2.85.

In the town, the population was spread out, with 24.6% under the age of 18, 4.2% from 18 to 24, 23.0% from 25 to 44, 26.9% from 45 to 64, and 21.3% who were 65 years of age or older. The median age was 44 years. For every 100 females, there were 117.7 males. For every 100 females age 18 and over, there were 113.5 males.

The median income for a household in the town was $24,583, and the median income for a family was $24,896. Males had a median income of $26,750 versus $17,813 for females. The per capita income for the town was $16,152. About 17.8% of families and 23.2% of the population were below the poverty line, including 41.1% of those under age 18 and 3.2% of those age 65 or over.
