= Odanah, Wisconsin =

Census-designated place in Wisconsin, United States

Odanah, Wisconsin Oodena
- Census-designated place
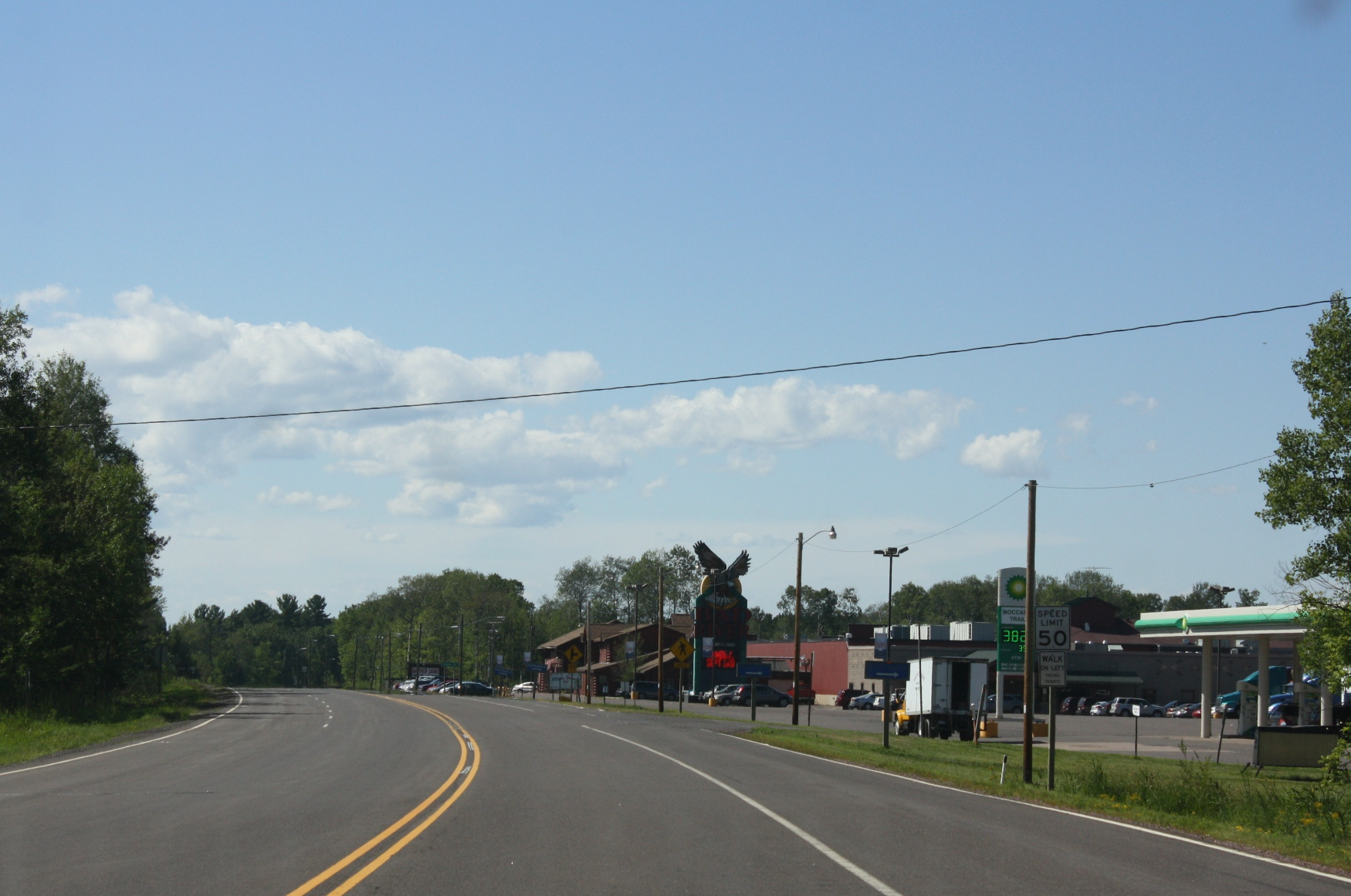
- Odanah on U.S. Route 2

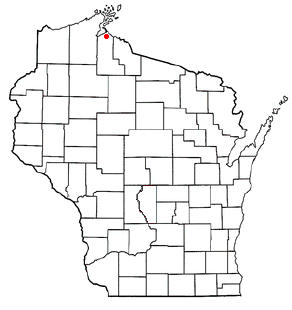
- Location of Odanah, Wisconsin
- Coordinates: 46°36′9″N 90°40′57″W
- Country: United States
- State: Wisconsin
- County: Ashland
- Town: Sanborn

Area
  - Total: 2.773 sq mi (7.18 km^{2})
  - Land: 2.617 sq mi (6.78 km^{2})
  - Water: 0.156 sq mi (0.40 km^{2})
- Elevation: 610 ft (186 m)

Population (2020)
  - Total: 47
  - Density: 18/sq mi (6.9/km^{2})
- Time zone: UTC-6 (Central (CST))
  - Summer (DST): UTC-5 (CDT)
- Area codes: 715 & 534
- FIPS code: 55-59450
- GNIS feature ID: 1570746

Odanah (Ojibwe: Oodena) is an unincorporated community and census-designated place (CDP) in Ashland County, Wisconsin, in the town of Sanborn, United States, on the banks of the Bad River. The population was 47 at the 2020 census.

Odanah is the cultural and administrative center of the Bad River Chippewa Band of the Chippewa.

For statistical purposes, the U.S. Census Bureau distinguishes Odanah from New Odanah, which has most of the community's population. In local parlance, the names are used interchangeably. Official state and county maps from the Wisconsin DOT only show Odanah.

== History ==
A post office called Odanah has been in operation since 1855. The name is from an Ojibwe language word, now spelled oodena, meaning "village."

A 1960 flood led to the establishment of the Bad River Housing Authority, which relocated thousands of Odanah residents to higher ground a few miles down the road, away from the flood plain.

== Geography ==
Odanah is located at 46°36′9″N 90°40′57″W (46.602594, -90.682582), along the Bad River.

According to the United States Census Bureau, the CDP has a total area of 2.77 square miles (7.18 km^{2}), of which 2.62 square miles (6.78 km^{2}) is land and 0.16 square miles (0.41 km^{2}) is water.

== Demographics ==
As of the census of 2000, there were 254 people, 94 households, and 64 families residing in the CDP. The population density was 165.2 people per square mile (63.7/km^{2}). There were 104 housing units at an average density of 67.6/sq mi (26.1/km^{2}). The racial makeup of the CDP was 4.72% White, 92.52% Native American, and 2.76% from two or more races. Hispanic or Latino of any race were 2.36% of the population.

There were 94 households, out of which 37.2% had children under the age of 18 living with them, 18.1% were married couples living together, 39.4% had a female householder with no husband present, and 30.9% were non-families. 26.6% of all households were made up of individuals, and 10.6% had someone living alone who was 65 years of age or older. The average household size was 2.70 and the average family size was 3.23.

In the CDP, the population was spread out, with 36.6% under the age of 18, 8.7% from 18 to 24, 27.2% from 25 to 44, 20.5% from 45 to 64, and 7.1% who were 65 years of age or older. The median age was 31 years. For every 100 females, there were 82.7 males. For every 100 females age 18 and over, there were 64.3 males.

The median income for a household in the CDP was $25,156, and the median income for a family was $24,125. Males had a median income of $25,000 versus $19,063 for females. The per capita income for the CDP was $9,950. About 23.9% of families and 29.7% of the population were below the poverty line, including 45.6% of those under the age of eighteen and none of those 65 or over.

== Notable people ==
- Justus Smith Stearns, prominent businessman in this community.

== Images ==
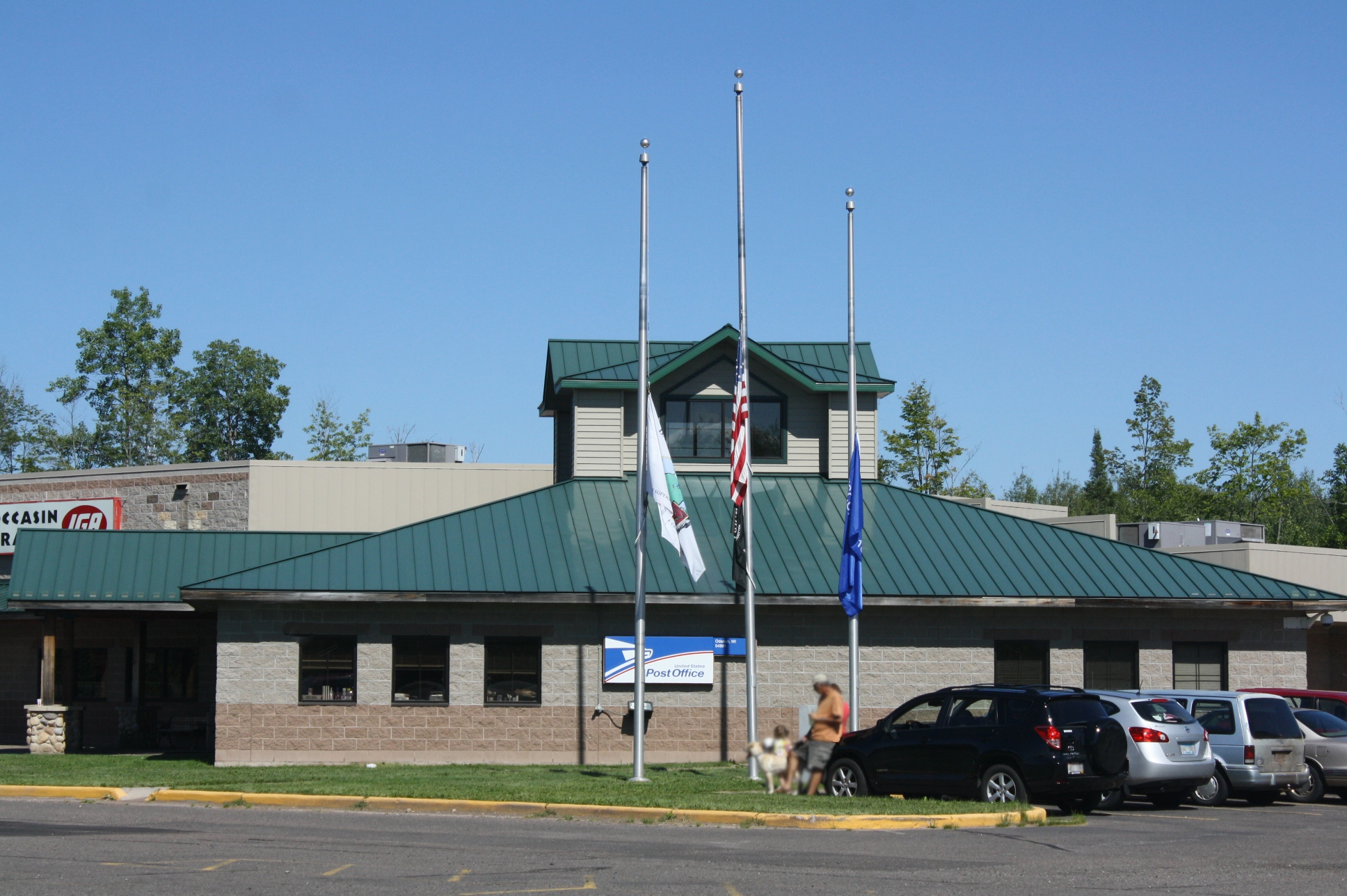
Post office

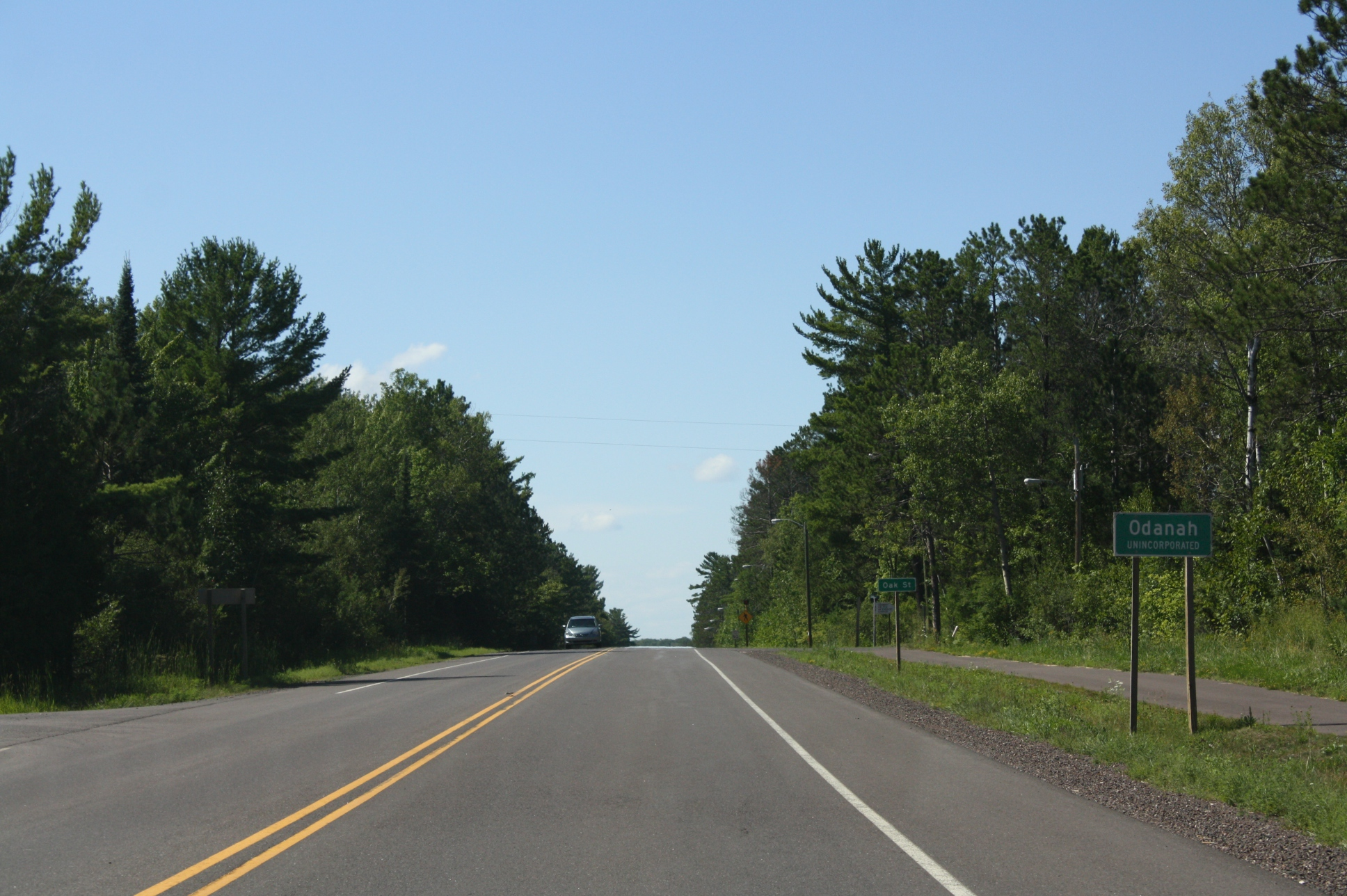
Sign on U.S. 2

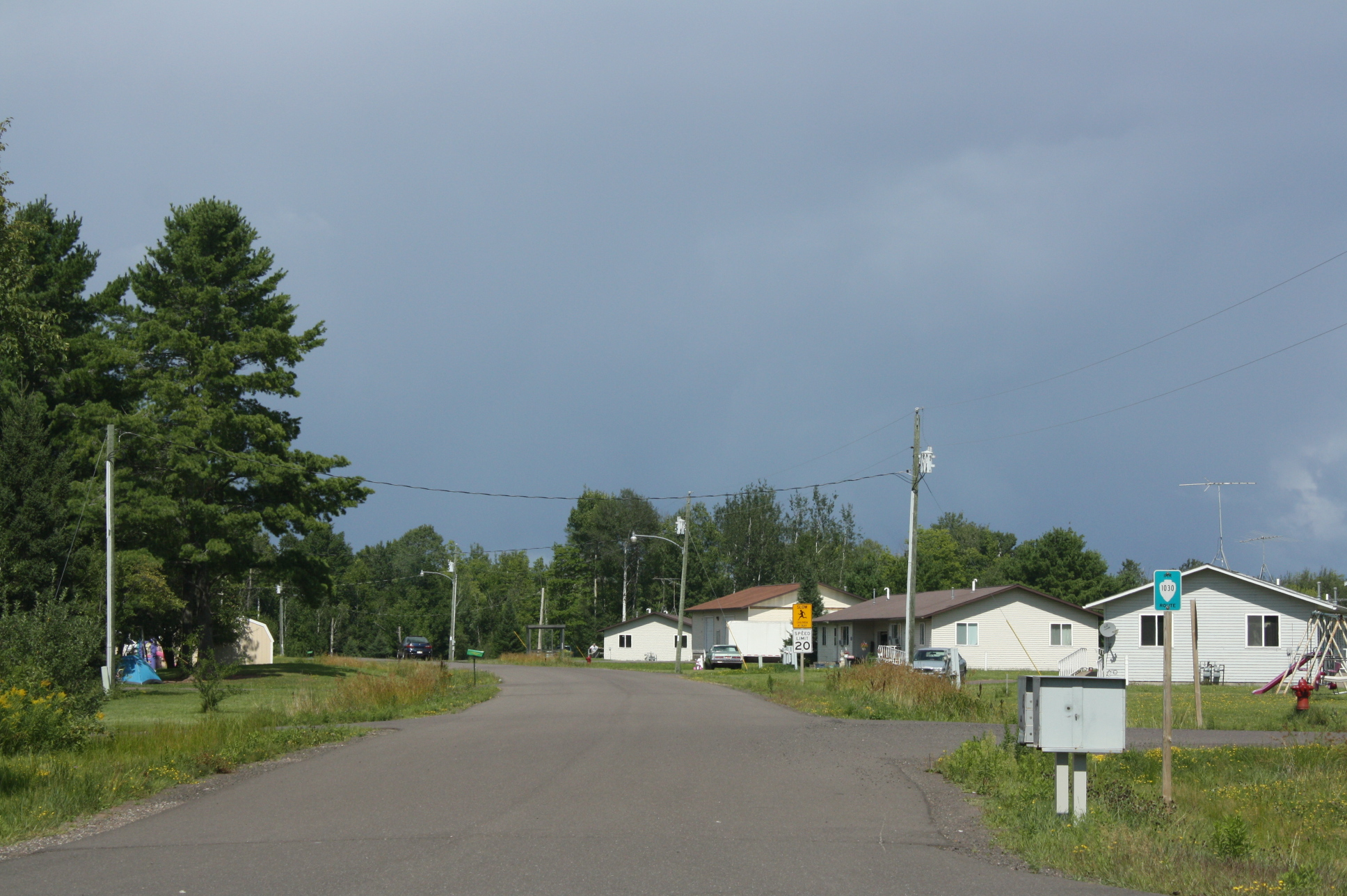
Looking north in Odanah

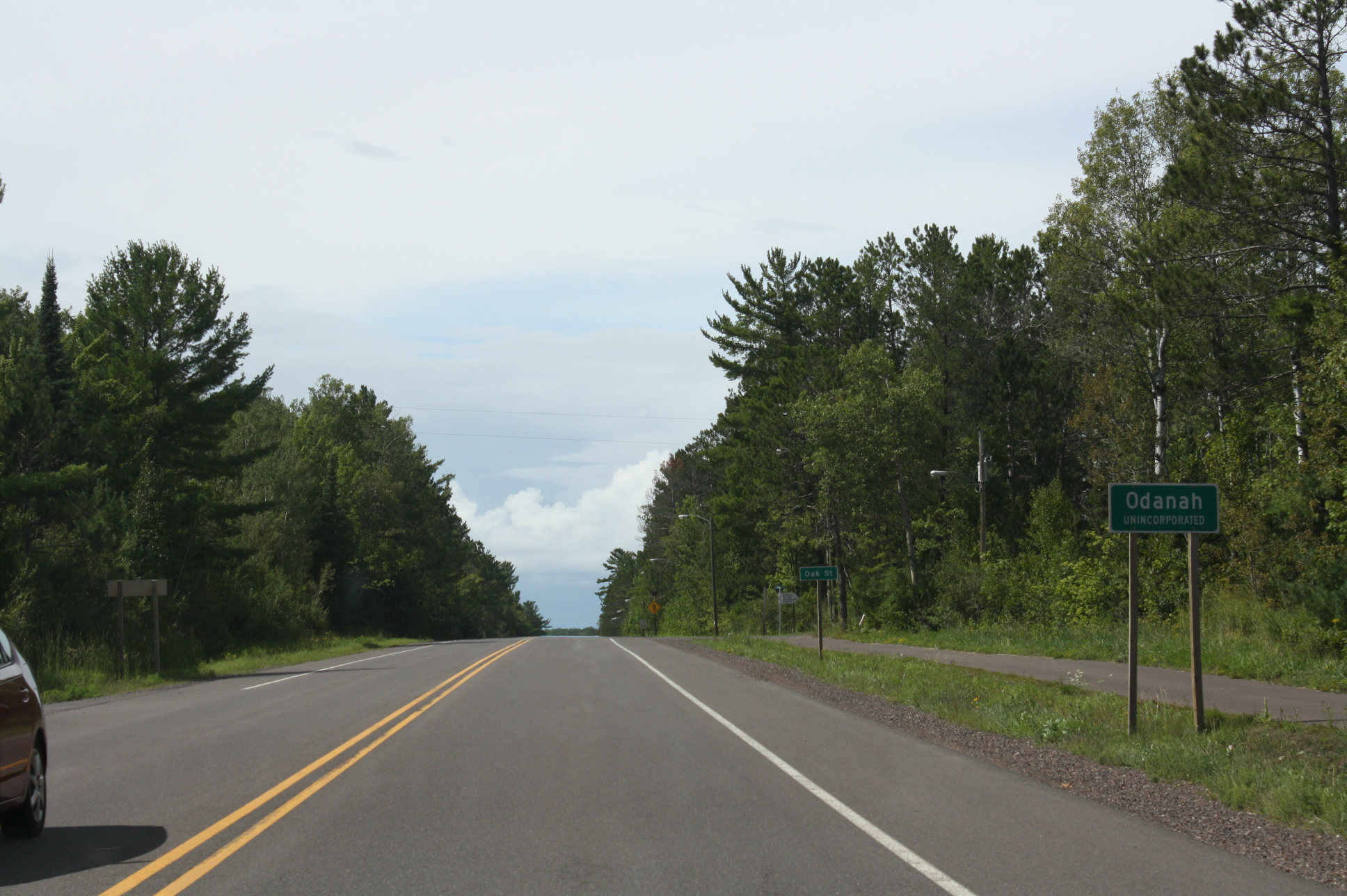
Looking west at the sign for Odanah

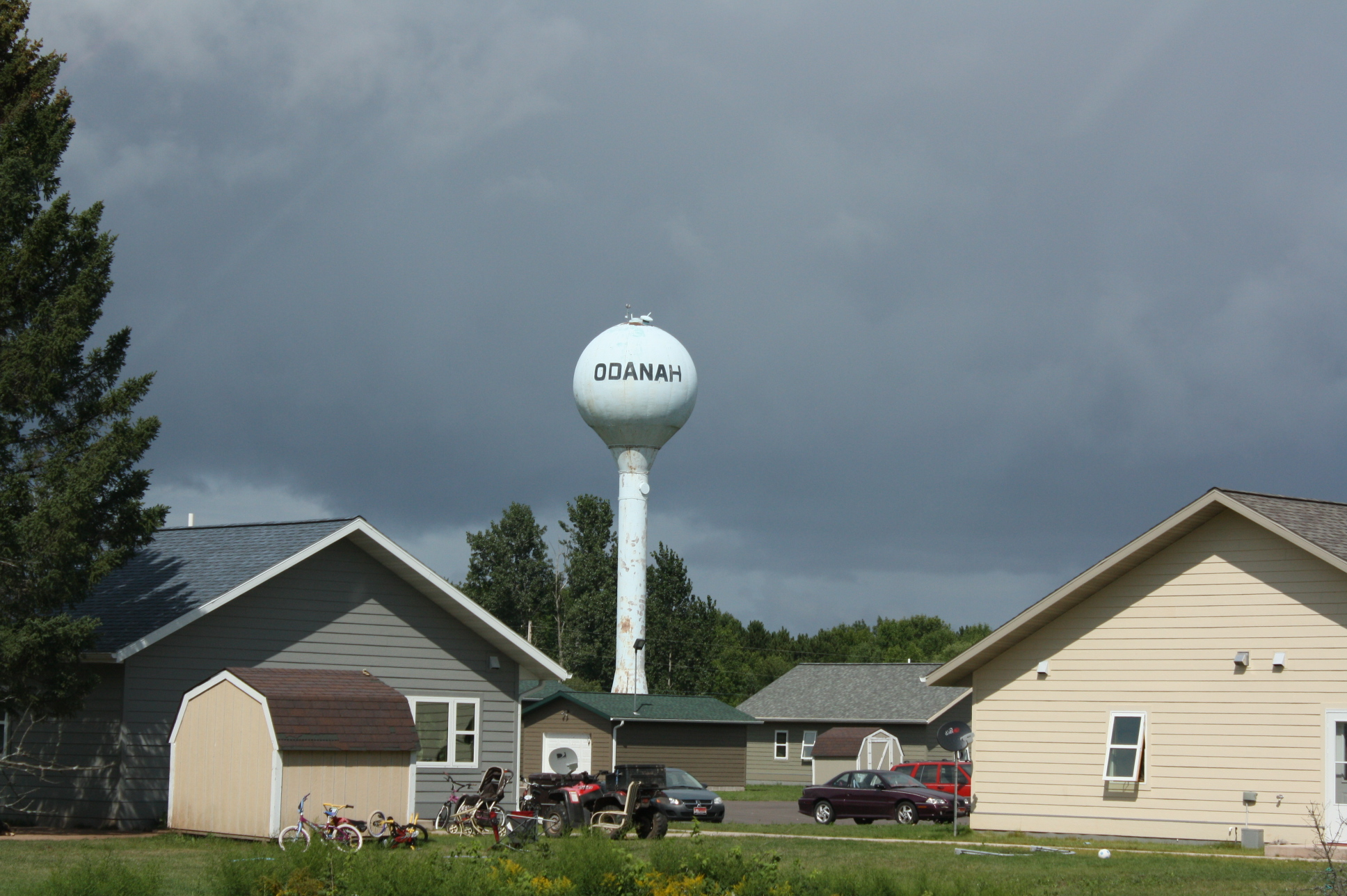
Water tower

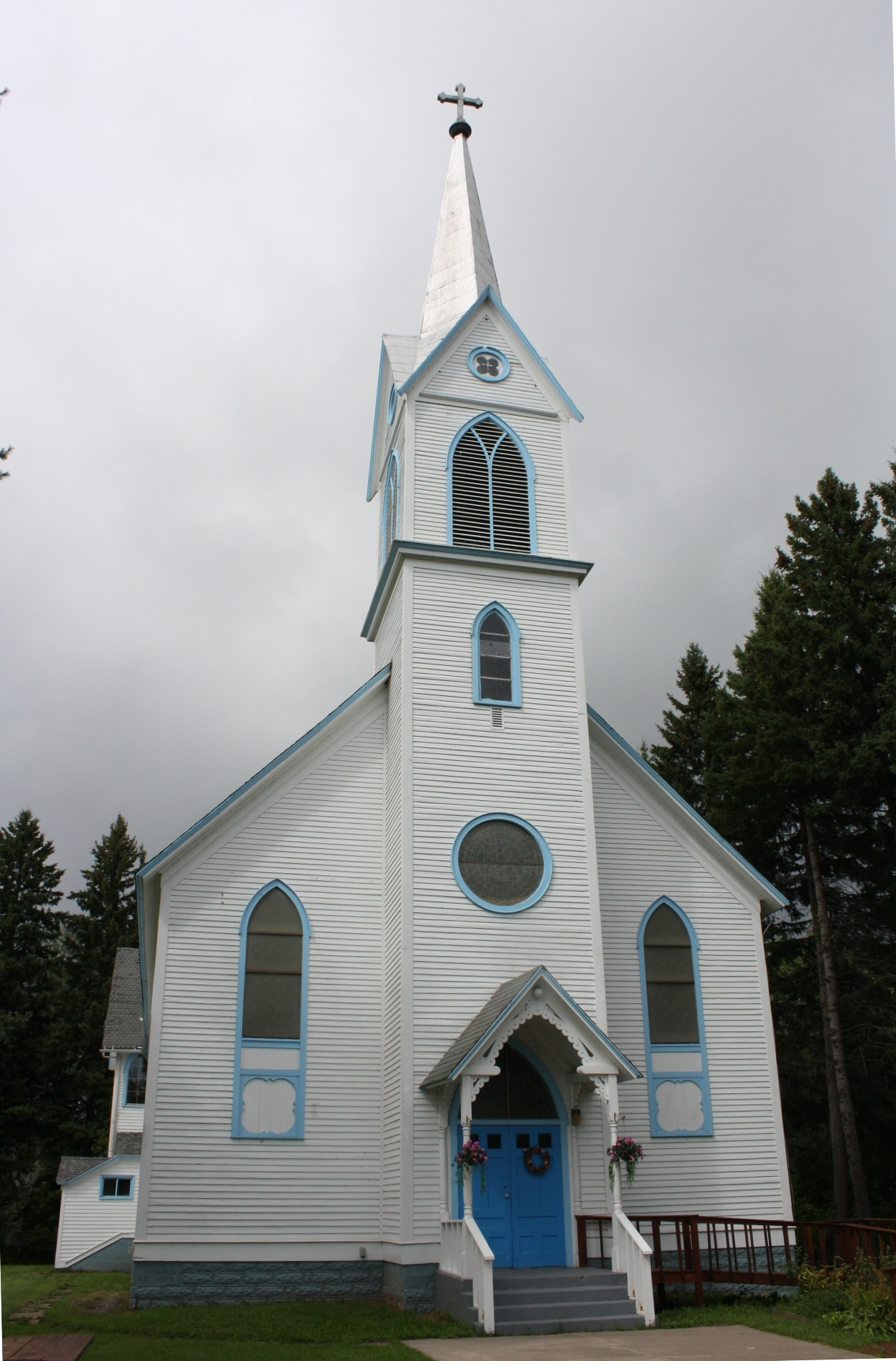
St. Mary Catholic Church

== See also ==
- New Odanah, Wisconsin
- Diaperville, Wisconsin (sometimes called "Old Odanah")
