= Peeksville, Georgia =

Unincorporated community in Georgia, U.S.

Coordinates: 33°22′41″N 84°00′17″W

Peeksville is an unincorporated community in Henry County, in the U.S. state of Georgia.

== History ==
Was a town with a post office called Peeksville was established in 1870, and remained in operation until 1901. The community was named after W. H. Peek, a local politician.
