= Chippewa, Wisconsin =

- Town
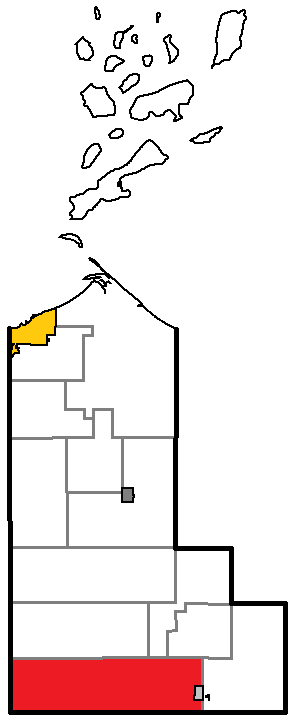
- Location of Chippewa, within Ashland County, Wisconsin
- Coordinates: 46°1′47″N 90°42′30″W
- Country: United States
- State: Wisconsin
- County: Ashland

Area
  - Total: 125.5 sq mi (325.1 km^{2})
  - Land: 124.5 sq mi (322.4 km^{2})
  - Water: 1.0 sq mi (2.7 km^{2})
- Elevation: 1,512 ft (461 m)

Population (2020)
  - Total: 349
  - Density: 2.80/sq mi (1.08/km^{2})
- Time zone: UTC-6 (Central (CST))
  - Summer (DST): UTC-5 (CDT)
- Area codes: 715 & 534
- FIPS code: 55-14550
- GNIS feature ID: 1582957
- Website: http://www.townofchippewawi.com/

Chippewa is a town in Ashland County, Wisconsin, United States. The population was 349 at the 2020 census.

== Geography ==
According to the United States Census Bureau, the town has a total area of 125.5 square miles (325.1 km^{2}), of which 124.5 square miles (322.4 km^{2}) is land and 1.0 square mile (2.7 km^{2}), or 0.83%, is water.

== Demographics ==
Historical population
Census	Pop.	Note	%±
1940	522		—
1950	426		−18.4%
1960	348		−18.3%
1970	417		19.8%
1980	402		−3.6%
1990	405		0.7%
2000	433		6.9%
2010	374		−13.6%
2020	349		−6.7%
U.S. Decennial Census

As of the census of 2000, there were 433 people, 156 households, and 122 families residing in the town. The population density was 3.5 people per square mile (1.3/km^{2}). There were 280 housing units at an average density of 2.3 per square mile (0.9/km^{2}). The racial makeup of the town was 98.15% White, 0.92% African American, 0.69% Native American, and 0.23% from two or more races. Hispanic or Latino of any race were 0.23% of the population.

There were 156 households, out of which 28.8% had children under the age of 18 living with them, 69.2% were married couples living together, 5.1% had a female householder with no husband present, and 21.2% were non-families. 18.6% of all households were made up of individuals, and 11.5% had someone living alone who was 65 years of age or older. The average household size was 2.72 and the average family size was 3.10.

In the town, the population was spread out, with 27.9% under the age of 18, 3.9% from 18 to 24, 26.6% from 25 to 44, 23.8% from 45 to 64, and 17.8% who were 65 years of age or older. The median age was 40 years. For every 100 females, there were 107.2 males. For every 100 females age 18 and over, there were 113.7 males.

The median income for a household in the town was $42,159, and the median income for a family was $47,250. Males had a median income of $38,750 versus $19,167 for females. The per capita income for the town was $16,841. About 5.3% of families and 8.7% of the population were below the poverty line, including 9.1% of those under age 18 and 2.9% of those age 65 or over.
