= New Odanah, Wisconsin =

Census-designated place in Wisconsin, United States

- Census-designated place
- Location within Wisconsin
- Coordinates: 46°36′10″N 90°39′34″W
- Country: United States
- State: Wisconsin
- County: Ashland
- Town: Sanborn

Area
  - Total: 2.426 sq mi (6.28 km^{2})
  - Land: 2.426 sq mi (6.28 km^{2})
  - Water: 0 sq mi (0 km^{2})
- Elevation: 617 ft (188 m)

Population (2020)
  - Total: 466
  - Density: 192.1/sq mi (74.2/km^{2})
- Time zone: UTC-6 (Central (CST))
  - Summer (DST): UTC-5 (CDT)
- Area codes: 715 & 534
- GNIS feature ID: 2585069

New Odanah is a census-designated place in the town of Sanborn, Ashland County, Wisconsin, United States. Its population was 466 as of the 2020 census. New Odanah is located on the Bad River Indian Reservation. In local parlance, New Odanah is considered part of Odanah, which is the only name that appears on Wisconsin DOT state and county maps.

== See also ==
- Odanah, Wisconsin
