= Franks Field, Wisconsin =

Census-designated place in Wisconsin, United States

- Census-designated place
- Location within Wisconsin
- Coordinates: 46°33′08″N 90°35′56″W
- Country: United States
- State: Wisconsin
- County: Ashland
- Town: Sanborn

Area
  - Total: 1.266 sq mi (3.28 km^{2})
  - Land: 1.266 sq mi (3.28 km^{2})
  - Water: 0 sq mi (0 km^{2})
- Elevation: 810 ft (250 m)

Population (2020)
  - Total: 160
  - Density: 130/sq mi (49/km^{2})
- Time zone: UTC-6 (Central (CST))
  - Summer (DST): UTC-5 (CDT)
- Area codes: 715 & 534
- GNIS feature ID: 2585063

Franks Field is a census-designated place in the town of Sanborn, Ashland County, Wisconsin, United States. Its population was 160 at the 2020 census, up from 154 at the 2010 census. Franks Field is located on the Bad River Indian Reservation.
