= Bad River (Wisconsin) =

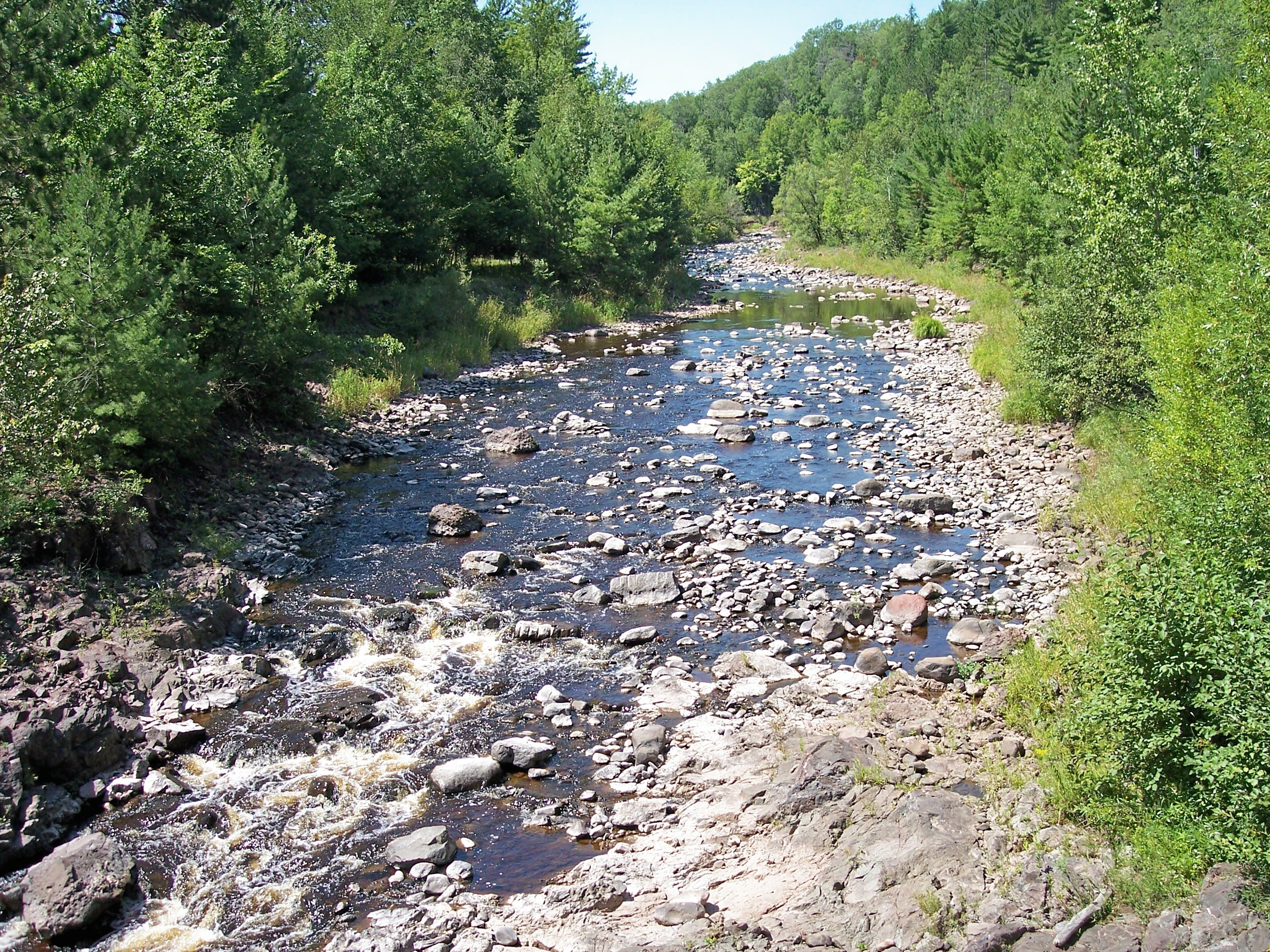
- The Bad River in Copper Falls State Park in 2006

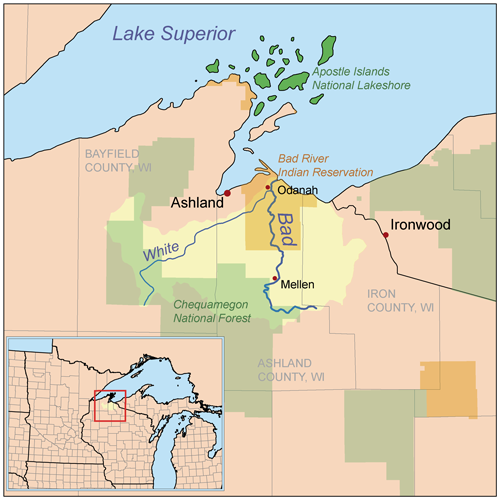
- Map of the Bad River watershed

Location
- Country: United States
- State: Wisconsin

Physical characteristics
- Source: Caroline Lake
  - coordinates: 46°16′05″N 90°33′40″W
  - elevation: 1,522 ft (464 m)
- Mouth: Lake Superior
  - location: Bad River Indian Reservation
  - coordinates: 46°38′17″N 90°39′09″W
  - elevation: 600 ft (180 m)
- Length: 74.3 mi (119.6 km)
- Basin size: 1,061 sq mi (2,750 km^{2})

Ramsar Wetland
- Official name: Kakagon and Bad River Sloughs
- Designated: 2 February 2012
- Reference no.: 2001

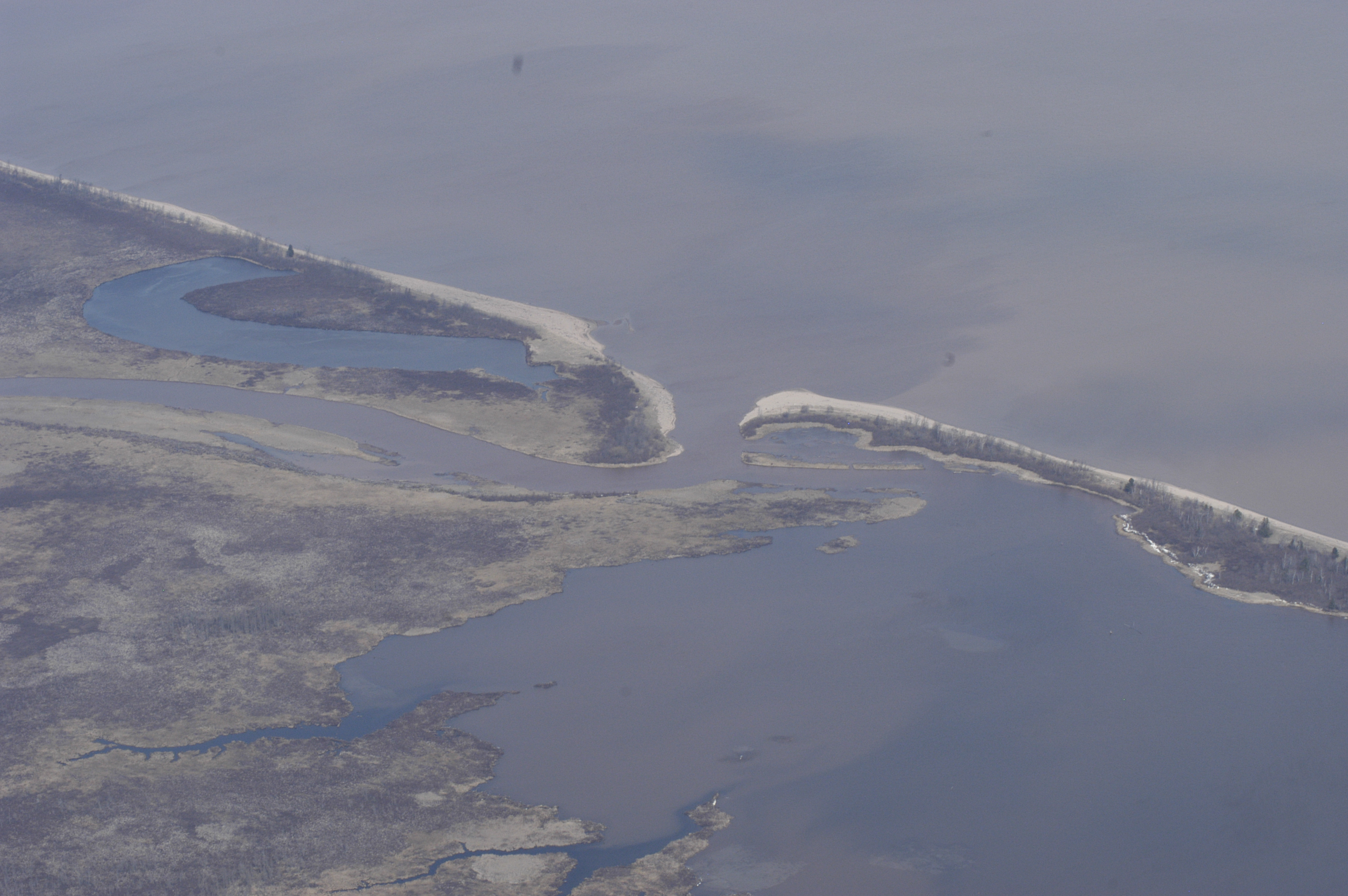
An aerial view of the mouth of the Bad River (center) and adjacent wetlands in 2006

The Bad River is a river flowing to Lake Superior in northern Wisconsin in the United States. It flows for 119.6 kilometres (74.3 mi) in Ashland County, draining an area of 1,061 square miles (2,750 km^{2}) in portions of Ashland, Bayfield and Iron counties. The Bad River sloughs were designated a Ramsar Wetland of International Importance on February 2, 2012.

== Course ==
The Bad River issues from the southwestern end of Caroline Lake, a 129-acre (52 ha) shallow lake on the boundary of Ashland and Iron counties which drains an area of acidic peatlands to its east. The Bad River initially flows southwestwardly before turning generally to the north for most of its course, along which it passes through the city of Mellen, Copper Falls State Park, and the community of Odanah in the Bad River Indian Reservation. In the vicinity of Mellen, the riverbed is commonly bedrock and boulder-strewn with numerous whitewater rapids; the river passes over waterfalls and through a granite gorge in Copper Falls State Park. In its lower course in the Bad River Reservation the river's delta along Lake Superior contributes to a 16,000-acre (6,500 ha) complex of wetlands known as sloughs.

The Bad River's largest tributary is the White River, which it collects near its mouth. Other principal tributaries include the Potato and Marengo rivers in its lower course; the Tyler Forks at Copper Falls State Park; and the Iron River upstream of Mellen.

== Wetlands ==
The Kakagon and Bad River Sloughs are one of the sites listed in the list of wetlands of international importance under the Ramsar Convention, which was signed in 1971 and entered into force in the US in 1987. It is one of 35 such sites in the US, which cover a total of 4,515,100 acres (1,827,196 ha). The Sloughs were designated on February 2, 2012, and cover 10,760 acres (4,355 ha). It is a "largely undeveloped wetland complex composed of sloughs, bogs and coastal lagoons that harbor the largest natural wild rice bed on the Great Lakes". Two rare mammal species, the grey wolf and the Canada lynx, are found in the wetlands, as are numerous populations of migratory and local bird species, including the endangered piping plover. The rice beds are necessary for maintaining genetic diversity in wild rice strains that grow around Lake Superior, and they are harvested using historic techniques by local tribes. The wetlands are threatened by invasive species, potential upriver mining and wastewater from human activities.

== Variant names ==
The United States Board on Geographic Names issued a decision clarifying the Bad River's name and course in 1965. According to the Geographic Names Information System, the stream has also been known historically as:

- Mashki-Sibi
- Maskesipi
- Maskigo
- Mushkeesebe
- Swamp River

== See also ==
- List of rivers of Wisconsin
