= Shanagolden (community), Wisconsin =

Shanagolden, Wisconsin
- Unincorporated community
- Location within Wisconsin Location within the United States
- Coordinates: 46°07′03″N 90°38′10″W
- Country: United States
- State: Wisconsin
- County: Ashland
- Town: Shanagolden
- Elevation: 1,506 ft (459 m)
- Time zone: UTC-6 (Central (CST))
  - Summer (DST): UTC-5 (CDT)
- Area codes: 715 & 534
- GNIS feature ID: 1580389

Shanagolden is an unincorporated community located in the town of Shanagolden, Ashland County, Wisconsin, United States. Shanagolden is located on the East Fork Chippewa River, 10 miles (16 km) northwest of Butternut.

== History ==
In 1901 the newly formed Nash Lumber Company bought 40,000 acres of timber in southern Ashland and Sawyer county. In 1902 and 1903 they selected a site along the Chippewa River and built a sawmill, a boarding house, a store which later housed the post office, homes for workers, a schoolhouse, and a four-mile railroad branch which connected to the Wisconsin Central line at Glidden. The plant consisted of a sawmill, a planing mill and a shingle mill.

The little mill town in northern Wisconsin was named "Shanagolden" after the fishing village in County Limerick, Ireland from which the Nashes' ancestors came. Unusual for the time, the Nashes preserved virgin timber around town for the looks. And they let workers buy lots and build their own homes as they chose, so the two streets weren't lined with identical boxes. The Nashes themselves had the Milwaukee architect Alexander Eschweiler design one of their homes and the meeting house/reading room of the Shanagolden Improvement Club, a women's club. Recreation included picnics, fairs, parties, fishing, hunting, baseball, trap shooting, card parties, and covert drinking at the livery stable. (The town was officially dry.)

In the winter of 1905-06 Nash had six camps with about 600 men logging in the surrounding forests. The mill employed 250 men and 300 to 350 people lived in the town. But despite glowing accounts of the operation in the newspapers, it was losing money.

In June 1907 the sawmill burned. The people saved the planing mill and the wood piles. There was talk of rebuilding, and that summer the company improved some of its buildings, but the sawmill was not rebuilt and most employees were laid off in November.

After a couple years the Mellen Lumber Company bought the mill at Shanagolden and much of the surrounding timber. They built a new shingle mill and resumed reduced operations. Then in 1912 the Mellen Company consolidated, moving the operations from Shanagolden into Glidden. Most of the workers moved too, and some of the homes were moved to Glidden on railcars and on horse-drawn sleighs in winter.

In 1916 the Ashland Farm Land Company bought the Nash buildings and 40,000 acres of surrounding cutover land, planning to sell the land to Bohemian farmers from Iowa and Illinois. They sold some 40 to 160 acre farms, going for $5 to $7 per acre, but the land was hard to farm. Major logging ended in 1919, the Soo Line abandoned the rail line to Glidden by 1925, and the town gradually withered.
