= Ashland (town), Wisconsin =

Ashland, Wisconsin
- Town
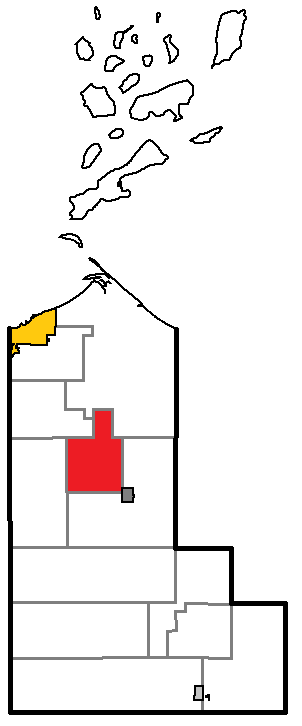
- Location of Ashland, within Ashland County, Wisconsin

- Location within the state of Wisconsin
- Coordinates: 46°22′59″N 90°44′2″W
- Country: United States
- State: Wisconsin
- County: Ashland

Area
  - Total: 41.3 sq mi (107.0 km^{2})
  - Land: 41.2 sq mi (106.8 km^{2})
  - Water: 0.077 sq mi (0.2 km^{2})

Population (2020)
  - Total: 589
  - Density: 14.3/sq mi (5.51/km^{2})
- Time zone: UTC-6 (Central (CST))
  - Summer (DST): UTC-5 (CDT)
- Area codes: 715 & 534
- FIPS code: 5500303250
- GNIS feature ID: 1582724
- Website: https://www.townofashlandwi.gov/

Ashland is a town in Ashland County, Wisconsin, United States. The population was 589 at the time of the 2020 census. The city of Ashland, population 7,908, is located about 15 miles (24 km) northwest of the town. The unincorporated communities of High Bridge, Minersville, North York, and part of Jolmaville are located in the town.

== Geography ==
The town of Ashland is located north of the center of Ashland County. Wisconsin Highway 13 passes through the town, leading north 14 miles (23 km) to the city of Ashland and south 2 miles (3 km) to Mellen and 35 miles (56 km) to Park Falls.

According to the United States Census Bureau, the town has a total area of 41.3 square miles (107.0 km^{2}), of which 41.2 square miles (106.8 km^{2}) is land and 0.077 square miles (0.2 km^{2}), or 0.19%, is water.

== Demographics ==
Historical population
Census	Pop.	Note	%±
1880	951		—
1890	1,607		69.0%
1900	709		−55.9%
1910	901		27.1%
1920	1,128		25.2%
1930	970		−14.0%
1940	995		2.6%
1950	785		−21.1%
1960	630		−19.7%
1970	504		−20.0%
1980	596		18.3%
1990	567		−4.9%
2000	603		6.3%
2010	594		−1.5%
2020	589		−0.8%
U.S. Decennial Census

As of the census of 2000, there were 603 people, 227 households, and 182 families residing in the town. The population density was 14.6 people per square mile (5.6/km^{2}). There were 277 housing units at an average density of 2.6 persons/km^{2} (6.7 persons/sq mi). The racial makeup of the town was 94.36% White, 0.17% African American, 3.32% Native American, 0.33% Asian, 0.00% Pacific Islander, 0.00% from other races, and 1.82% from two or more races. 0.33% of the population were Hispanic or Latino of any race.

There were 227 households, out of which 31.7% had children under the age of 18 living with them, 66.1% were married couples living together, 8.8% have a woman whose husband does not live with her, and 19.4% were non-families. 17.2% of all households were made up of individuals, and 7.9% had someone living alone who was 65 years of age or older. The average household size was 2.66 and the average family size was 2.96.

In the town, the population was spread out, with 25.0% under the age of 18, 11.3% from 18 to 24, 24.4% from 25 to 44, 27.0% from 45 to 64, and 12.3% who were 65 years of age or older. The median age was 38 years. For every 100 females, there were 105.1 males. For every 100 females age 18 and over, there were 100.9 males.

The median income for a household in the town was $34,063, and the median income for a family was $39,219. Males had a median income of $25,875 versus $19,327 for females. The per capita income for the town was $15,390. 12.7% of the population and 10.5% of families were below the poverty line. Out of the total people living in poverty, 21.6% are under the age of 18 and 4.8% are 65 or older.
