= Peeksville, Wisconsin =

- Town
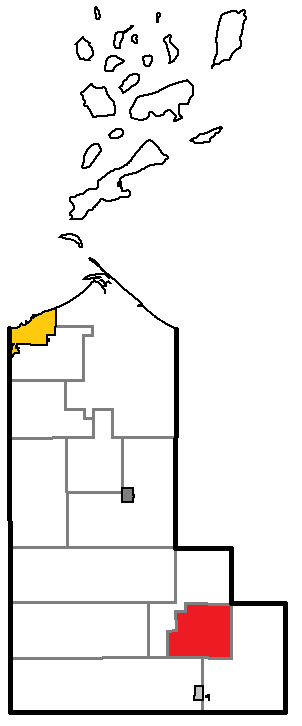
- Location of Peeksville, within Ashland County, Wisconsin
- Coordinates: 46°7′38″N 90°30′39″W
- Country: United States
- State: Wisconsin
- County: Ashland

Area
  - Total: 36.9 sq mi (95.6 km^{2})
  - Land: 36.8 sq mi (95.3 km^{2})
  - Water: 0.12 sq mi (0.3 km^{2})
- Elevation: 1,610 ft (490 m)

Population (2020)
  - Total: 137
  - Density: 3.72/sq mi (1.44/km^{2})
- Time zone: UTC-6 (Central (CST))
  - Summer (DST): UTC-5 (CDT)
- Area codes: 715 & 534
- FIPS code: 55-61600
- GNIS feature ID: 1583902

Peeksville is a town in Ashland County in the U.S. state of Wisconsin. The population was 137 at the 2020 census.

== Geography ==
According to the United States Census Bureau, the town has a total area of 36.9 square miles (95.6 km^{2}), of which 36.8 square miles (95.3 km^{2}) is land and 0.12 square miles (0.3 km^{2}), or 0.29%, is water.

== Demographics ==
Historical population
Census	Pop.	Note	%±
1950	360		—
1960	276		−23.3%
1970	292		5.8%
1980	224		−23.3%
1990	182		−18.7%
2000	176		−3.3%
2010	141		−19.9%
2020	137		−2.8%
U.S. Decennial Census

As of the census of 2000, there were 176 people, 68 households, and 52 families residing in the town. The population density was 4.8 people per square mile (1.8/km^{2}). There were 125 housing units at an average density of 3.4 per square mile (1.3/km^{2}). The racial makeup of the town was 100.00% White.

There were 68 households, out of which 32.4% had children under the age of 18 living with them, 67.6% were married couples living together, 2.9% had a female householder with no husband present, and 23.5% were non-families. 20.6% of all households were made up of individuals, and 7.4% had someone living alone who was 65 years of age or older. The average household size was 2.59 and the average family size was 3.02.

In the town, the population was spread out, with 23.3% under the age of 18, 8.0% from 18 to 24, 22.7% from 25 to 44, 33.5% from 45 to 64, and 12.5% who were 65 years of age or older. The median age was 43 years. For every 100 females, there were 102.3 males. For every 100 females age 18 and over, there were 110.9 males.

The median income for a household in the town was $39,167, and the median income for a family was $39,375. Males had a median income of $35,625 versus $25,357 for females. The per capita income for the town was $20,533. About 3.4% of families and 4.7% of the population were below the poverty line, including 13.3% of those under the age of eighteen and 6.5% of those 65 or over.
