= Birch Hill, Wisconsin =

Census-designated place in Wisconsin, United States

- Census-designated place
- Location within Wisconsin
- Coordinates: 46°31′15″N 90°33′20″W
- Country: United States
- State: Wisconsin
- County: Ashland

Area
  - Total: 0.619 sq mi (1.60 km^{2})
  - Land: 0.619 sq mi (1.60 km^{2})
  - Water: 0 sq mi (0 km^{2})
- Elevation: 1,079 ft (329 m)

Population (2020)
  - Total: 295
  - Density: 477/sq mi (184/km^{2})
- Time zone: UTC-6 (Central (CST))
  - Summer (DST): UTC-5 (CDT)
- Area codes: 715 & 534
- GNIS feature ID: 2585058

Birch Hill is a census-designated place in the town of Sanborn, Ashland County, Wisconsin, United States. Its population was 295 at the 2020 census, a small increase from 293 at the 2010 census.
