= Ashland County, Wisconsin =

County in Wisconsin, United States

- County
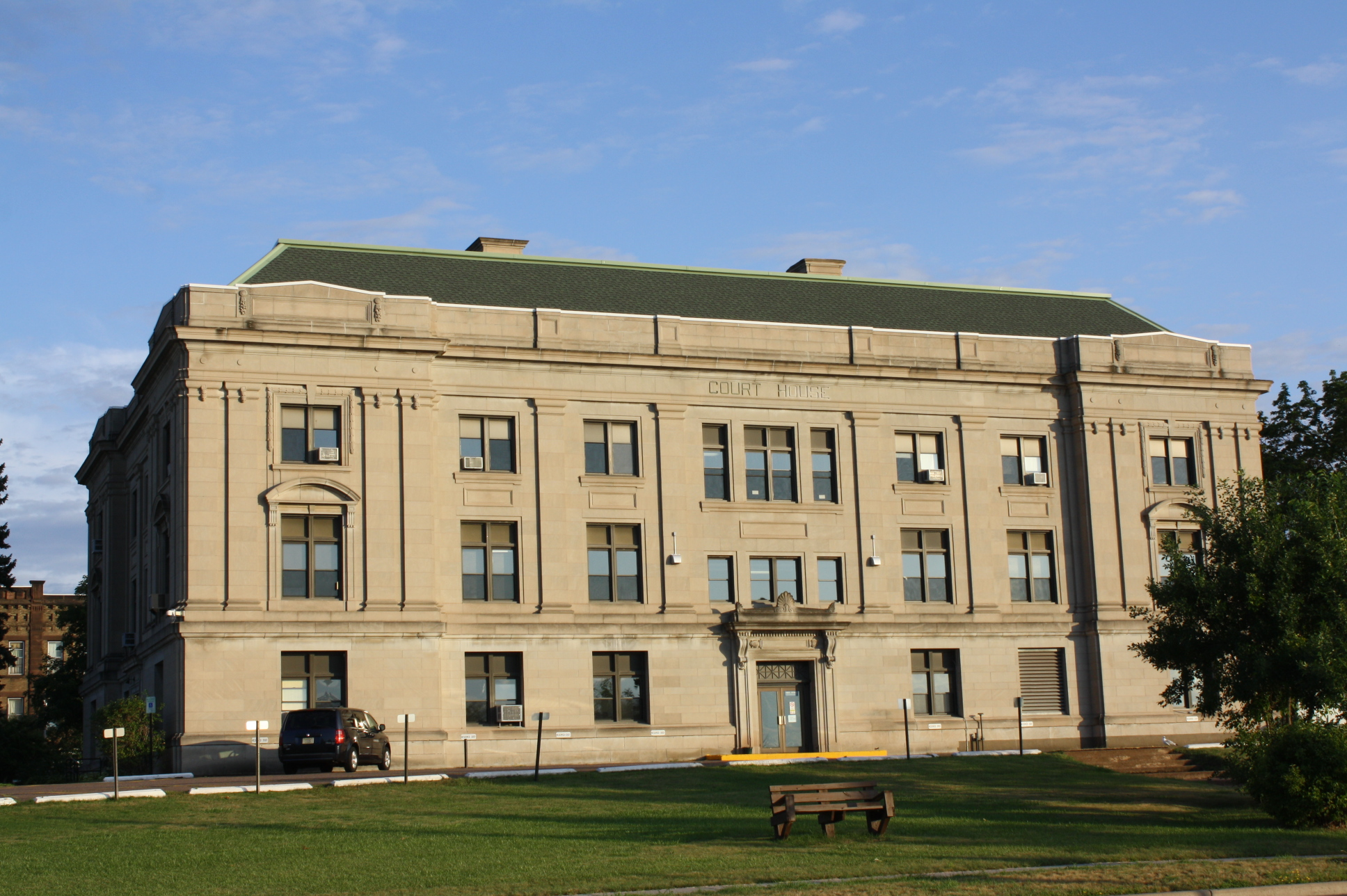
- Ashland County Courthouse

- Location within the U.S. state of Wisconsin
- Coordinates: 46°43′N 90°34′W
- Country: United States
- State: Wisconsin
- Founded: March 27, 1860
- Named for: Henry Clay's farm Ashland
- Seat: Ashland
- Largest city: Ashland

Area
  - Total: 2,292 sq mi (5,940 km^{2})
  - Land: 1,045 sq mi (2,710 km^{2})
  - Water: 1,247 sq mi (3,230 km^{2}) 54%

Population (2020)
  - Total: 16,027
  - Estimate (2025): 16,203 ▲
  - Density: 15.34/sq mi (5.922/km^{2})
- Time zone: UTC−6 (Central)
  - Summer (DST): UTC−5 (CDT)
- Congressional district: 7th
- Website: ashlandcountywi.gov

Ashland County is a county located in the U.S. state of Wisconsin. As of the 2020 census, the population was 16,027. Its county seat is Ashland. The county was formed on March 27, 1860, from La Pointe County. The county partly overlaps with the reservation of the Bad River Band of the Lake Superior Tribe of Chippewa Indians.

== History ==
Ashland County was named in honor of the Lexington estate of Kentucky statesman Henry Clay, as one of the founders of the city of Ashland was an admirer of Clay.

== Geography ==
According to the U.S. Census Bureau, the county has a total area of 2,292 square miles (5,940 km^{2}), of which 1,045 square miles (2,710 km^{2}) is land and 1,247 square miles (3,230 km^{2}) (54%) is water. It is the second-largest county in Wisconsin by total area. The Apostle Islands are a small group of islands in Lake Superior, off the Bayfield Peninsula with the majority of the islands located in Ashland County — only Eagle, Sand, York and Raspberry Islands are in Bayfield County.

=== Adjacent counties ===
- Iron County – east
- Price County – southeast
- Sawyer County – southwest
- Bayfield County – northwest
- Lake County, Minnesota – northwest
- Cook County, Minnesota – north
- Ontonagon County, Michigan – northeast
- Gogebic County, Michigan – northeast

=== Major highways ===
- U.S. Highway 2
- Highway 13 (Wisconsin)
- Highway 77 (Wisconsin)
- Highway 112 (Wisconsin)
- Highway 118 (Wisconsin)
- Highway 137 (Wisconsin)
- Highway 169 (Wisconsin)

=== Railroads ===
- Watco

=== Buses ===
- Bay Area Rural Transit
- Indian Trails

=== Airports ===
- John F. Kennedy Memorial Airport (KASX) serves the county and surrounding communities.
- Major Gilbert Field Airport (4R5) enhances county service.

=== National protected area ===
- Apostle Islands National Lakeshore (part)
- Chequamegon National Forest (part)

== Demographics ==
Historical population
Census	Pop.	Note	%±
1860	515		—
1870	221		−57.1%
1880	1,559		605.4%
1890	20,063		1,186.9%
1900	20,176		0.6%
1910	21,965		8.9%
1920	24,538		11.7%
1930	21,054		−14.2%
1940	21,801		3.5%
1950	19,461		−10.7%
1960	17,375		−10.7%
1970	16,743		−3.6%
1980	16,783		0.2%
1990	16,307		−2.8%
2000	16,866		3.4%
2010	16,157		−4.2%
2020	16,027		−0.8%
2025 (est.)	16,203	▲	1.1%
U.S. Decennial Census; 1790–1960 1900–1990; 1990–2000 2010 2020

=== Racial and ethnic composition ===
Ashland County, Wisconsin – Racial and ethnic composition Note: the US Census treats Hispanic/Latino as an ethnic category. This table excludes Latinos from the racial categories and assigns them to a separate category. Hispanics/Latinos may be of any race.
Race / ethnicity (NH = Non-Hispanic)	Pop 1980	Pop 1990	Pop 2000	Pop 2010	Pop 2020	% 1980	% 1990	% 2000	% 2010	% 2020
White alone (NH)	15,593	14,690	14,622	13,534	12,678	92.91%	90.08%	86.70%	83.77%	79.10%
Black or African American alone (NH)	24	13	35	47	112	0.14%	0.08%	0.21%	0.29%	0.70%
Native American or Alaska Native alone (NH)	1,077	1,452	1,696	1,713	1,999	6.42%	8.90%	10.06%	10.60%	12.47%
Asian alone (NH)	40	45	53	58	82	0.24%	0.28%	0.31%	0.36%	0.51%
Native Hawaiian or Pacific Islander alone (NH)	x	x	7	4	9	x	x	0.04%	0.02%	0.06%
Other race alone (NH)	0	1	4	7	22	0.00%	0.01%	0.02%	0.04%	0.14%
Mixed race or Multiracial (NH)	x	x	261	492	742	x	x	1.55%	3.05%	4.63%
Hispanic or Latino (any race)	49	106	188	302	383	0.29%	0.65%	1.11%	1.87%	2.39%
Total	16,783	16,307	16,866	16,157	16,027	100.00%	100.00%	100.00%	100.00%	100.00%

=== 2020 census ===
As of the 2020 census, the county had a population of 16,027, resulting in a population density of 15.3 per square mile. There were 9,407 housing units at an average density of 9.0 per square mile; 27.7% of those units were vacant and among occupied units 69.0% were owner-occupied while 31.0% were renter-occupied, with homeowner and rental vacancy rates of 2.4% and 8.6%, respectively.

The median age was 42.6 years, with 21.5% of residents under the age of 18 and 21.3% aged 65 or older. For every 100 females there were 99.5 males, and for every 100 females age 18 and over there were 98.0 males age 18 and over.

There were 6,805 households in the county, of which 24.3% had children under the age of 18 living in them. Of all households, 41.3% were married-couple households, 22.4% were households with a male householder and no spouse or partner present, and 27.2% were households with a female householder and no spouse or partner present. About 34.9% of all households were made up of individuals and 16.0% had someone living alone who was 65 years of age or older.

The racial makeup of the county was 79.8% White, 0.7% Black or African American, 13.0% American Indian and Alaska Native, 0.5% Asian, 0.1% Native Hawaiian and Pacific Islander, 0.3% from some other race, and 5.6% from two or more races. Hispanic or Latino residents of any race comprised 2.4% of the population.

45.1% of residents lived in urban areas, while 54.9% lived in rural areas.

=== 2010 census ===
As of the 2010 United States census, there were 16,157 people living in the county. 84.6% were White, 11.1% Native American, 0.4% Asian, 0.3% Black or African American, 0.3% of some other race and 3.3% of two or more races. 1.9% were Hispanic or Latino (of any race). 25.6% were of German, 7.6% Finnish, 6.8% American, 6.5% Irish and 5.3% Norwegian ancestry.

=== 2000 census ===
2000 Census Age Pyramid for Ashland County

As of the census of 2000, there were 16,866 people, 6,718 households, and 4,279 families living in the county. The population density was 16 people per square mile (6.2 people/km^{2}). There were 8,883 housing units at an average density of 8 units per square mile (3.1 units/km^{2}). The racial makeup of the county was 87.10% White, 0.21% Black or African American, 10.35% Native American, 0.31% Asian, 0.05% Pacific Islander, 0.29% from other races, and 1.69% from two or more races. 1.11% of the population were Hispanic or Latino of any race. 27.8% were of German, 8.4% Finnish, 7.4% Polish, 7.4% Norwegian, 7.3% Swedish and 5.4% Irish ancestry. 96.6% spoke English as their first language. The reservation of the Bad River Chippewa Band is partially located in the county.

There were 6,718 households, out of which 30.30% had children under the age of 18 living with them, 48.60% were married couples living together, 10.90% had a female householder with no husband present, and 36.30% were non-families. 30.80% of all households were made up of individuals, and 14.40% had someone living alone who was 65 years of age or older. The average household size was 2.39 and the average family size was 3.01.

In the county, the population was spread out, with 25.40% under the age of 18, 11.20% from 18 to 24, 25.80% from 25 to 44, 21.70% from 45 to 64, and 15.90% who were 65 years of age or older. The median age was 37 years. For every 100 females there were 97.10 males. For every 100 females age 18 and over, there were 91.10 males.

In 2017, there were 194 births, giving a general fertility rate of 73.1 births per 1000 women aged 15–44, the eleventh highest rate out of all 72 Wisconsin counties. Additionally, there were no reported induced abortions performed on women of Ashland County residence in 2017.

== Communities ==
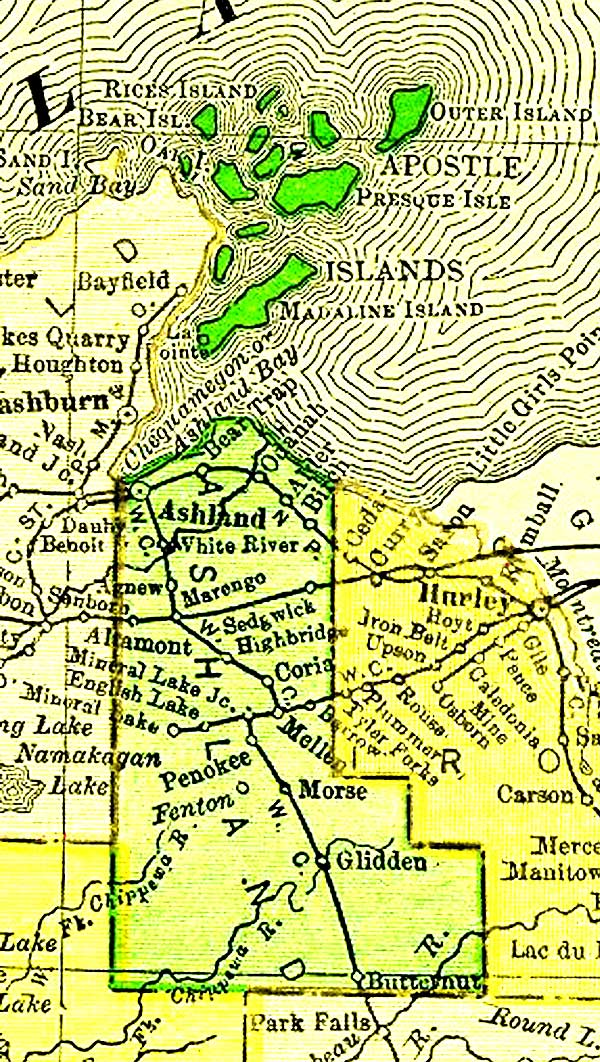
Ashland County, Wisconsin from 1895 U.S. Atlas

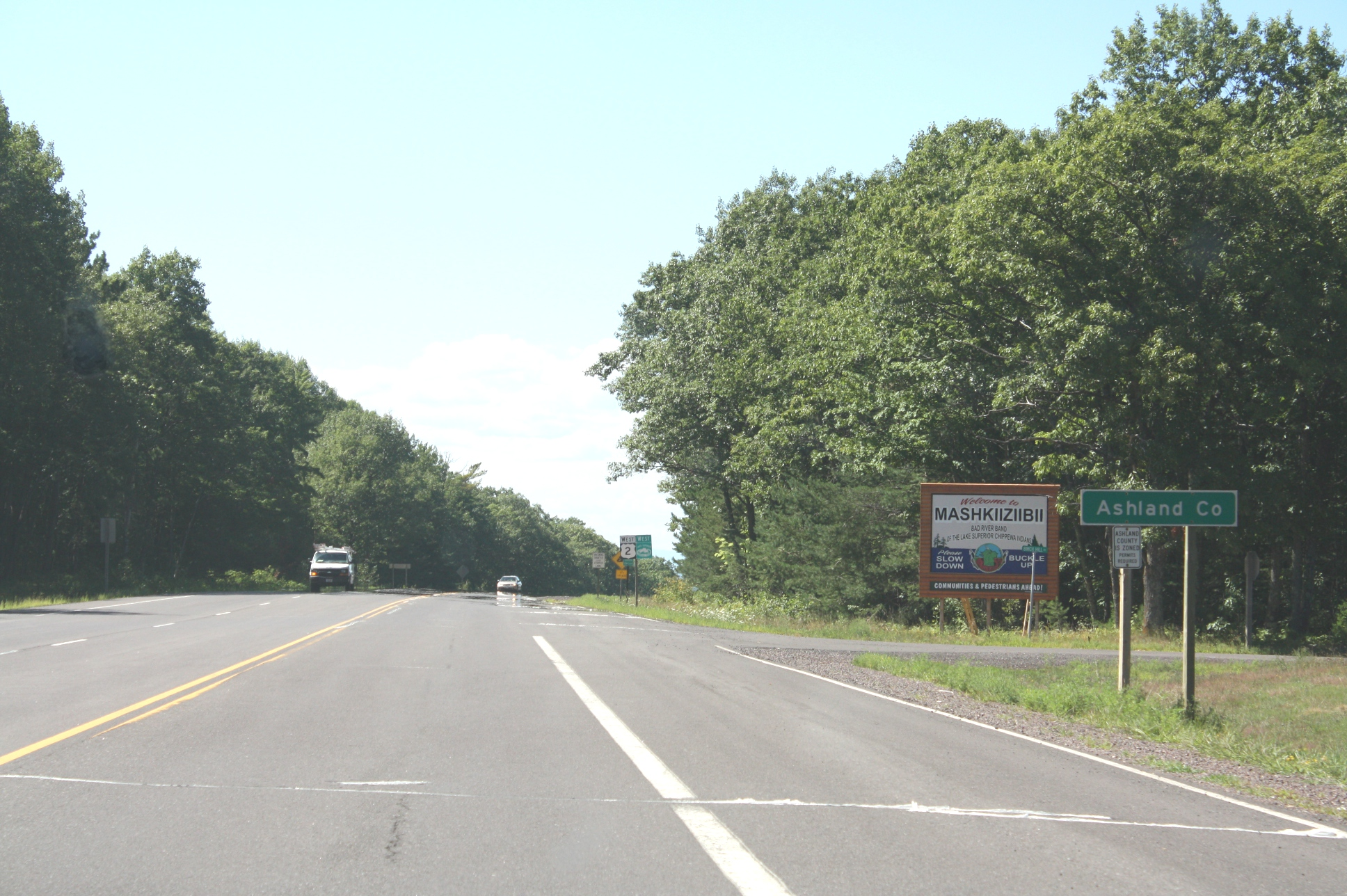
Entrance sign on U.S. Route 2

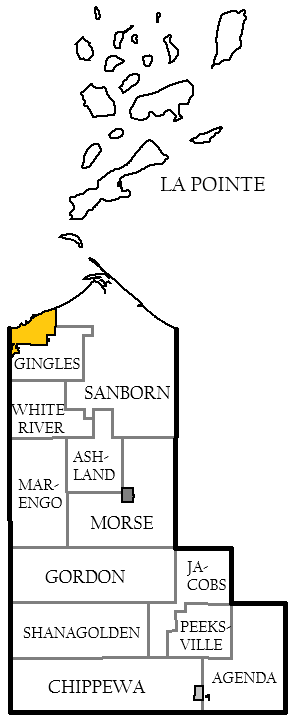
Towns of Ashland County

=== Cities ===
- Ashland (county seat; partly in Bayfield County)
- Mellen

=== Village ===
- Butternut

=== Towns ===
- Agenda
- Ashland
- Chippewa
- Gingles
- Gordon
- Jacobs
- La Pointe
- Marengo
- Morse
- Peeksville
- Sanborn
- Shanagolden
- White River

=== Census-designated places ===
- Bayfront
- Birch Hill
- Clam Lake
- Diaperville
- Franks Field
- Glidden
- Jolmaville
- Marengo
- New Odanah
- Odanah

=== Unincorporated communities ===
- Ballou
- Birch
- Cayuga
- Foster Junction
- Highbridge
- Holts Landing
- La Pointe
- Middleport
- Minersville
- Morse
- North York
- Old Fort
- Peeksville
- Penokee
- Petes Landing
- Sanborn
- Sedgwick
- Shanagolden
- White River

== Politics ==
United States presidential election results for Ashland County, Wisconsin
Year	Republican		Democratic		Third party(ies)	
Year	No.	%	No.	%	No.	%
1892	2,283	46.46%	2,436	49.57%	195	3.97%
1896	2,738	59.70%	1,743	38.01%	105	2.29%
1900	3,034	63.97%	1,557	32.83%	152	3.20%
1904	3,406	71.40%	1,004	21.05%	360	7.55%
1908	2,259	54.21%	1,582	37.96%	326	7.82%
1912	937	26.83%	1,451	41.54%	1,105	31.63%
1916	1,998	51.98%	1,582	41.16%	264	6.87%
1920	4,005	70.94%	1,081	19.15%	560	9.92%
1924	2,272	32.44%	449	6.41%	4,283	61.15%
1928	3,639	49.36%	3,570	48.43%	163	2.21%
1932	2,646	31.77%	5,405	64.90%	277	3.33%
1936	2,439	28.10%	5,904	68.01%	338	3.89%
1940	3,592	38.59%	5,586	60.01%	131	1.41%
1944	3,183	40.60%	4,609	58.80%	47	0.60%
1948	3,135	41.75%	4,110	54.73%	264	3.52%
1952	4,451	53.50%	3,828	46.01%	41	0.49%
1956	4,121	52.70%	3,677	47.03%	21	0.27%
1960	3,470	42.70%	4,644	57.14%	13	0.16%
1964	2,198	28.96%	5,383	70.91%	10	0.13%
1968	2,557	35.74%	4,147	57.96%	451	6.30%
1972	3,478	46.93%	3,771	50.88%	162	2.19%
1976	3,045	38.25%	4,688	58.89%	228	2.86%
1980	3,262	37.56%	4,469	51.46%	954	10.98%
1984	3,517	42.54%	4,680	56.60%	71	0.86%
1988	2,926	39.11%	4,526	60.49%	30	0.40%
1992	2,372	28.26%	4,213	50.20%	1,808	21.54%
1996	1,863	27.41%	3,808	56.02%	1,127	16.58%
2000	3,038	38.50%	4,356	55.21%	496	6.29%
2004	3,313	36.01%	5,805	63.10%	81	0.88%
2008	2,634	30.72%	5,818	67.86%	122	1.42%
2012	2,820	33.68%	5,399	64.49%	153	1.83%
2016	3,303	41.12%	4,226	52.61%	503	6.26%
2020	3,841	43.86%	4,801	54.82%	115	1.31%
2024	4,191	46.80%	4,612	51.50%	152	1.70%

During the 1930s and 1940s at the state level Ashland county was a stronghold for the Wisconsin Progressive Party - National Progressives. voting consistently for Philip La Follette during gubernatorial elections and Robert M. La Follette Jr. for senate. Ashland County is consistently Democratic. It has voted for the Democrat in every presidential election since 1932, with the exceptions of 1952 and 1956 when it backed Republican Dwight D. Eisenhower's two successful bids for the presidency. The Democratic margin has narrowed in recent elections since the Obama era, with Donald Trump's 2024 performance of over 46% being the best by a Republican since Nixon in 1972. This was also the first time since 1972 that a Democrat carried the county by only a single-digit margin.

Despite Ashland County's Democratic leanings, three consecutive district attorneys of Ashland County in the 1990s and early 2000s, each elected as Republicans, went on to hold major positions in state or federal politics. J.B. Van Hollen, district attorney from 1993 to 1999, later served as United States Attorney for the Western District of Wisconsin in the administration of President George W. Bush and as Attorney General of Wisconsin from 2007 to 2015. Van Hollen's successor as district attorney, Michael Gableman, who served from 1999 to 2002, was later a justice of the Wisconsin Supreme Court from 2008 to 2018. Gableman's successor as district attorney, Sean Duffy, who served from 2002 to 2010, served as the U.S. representative for Wisconsin's 7th congressional district from 2011 to 2019 and is the current United States Secretary of Transportation.

== See also ==
- National Register of Historic Places listings in Ashland County, Wisconsin
- List of counties in Wisconsin
