= Diaperville, Wisconsin =

Census-designated place in Wisconsin, United States

- Census-designated place
- Location within Wisconsin
- Coordinates: 46°36′28″N 90°42′36″W
- Country: United States
- State: Wisconsin
- County: Ashland
- Town: Sanborn

Area
  - Total: 0.410 sq mi (1.06 km^{2})
  - Land: 0.409 sq mi (1.06 km^{2})
  - Water: 0.001 sq mi (0.0026 km^{2})
- Elevation: 607 ft (185 m)

Population (2020)
  - Total: 67
  - Density: 160/sq mi (63/km^{2})
- Time zone: UTC-6 (Central (CST))
  - Summer (DST): UTC-5 (CDT)
- Area codes: 715 & 534
- GNIS feature ID: 2585061

Diaperville is a census-designated place in the town of Sanborn, Ashland County, Wisconsin, United States. Its population was 67 as of the 2020 census, down from 70 at the 2010 census. Diaperville was also called Old Odanah.
