= Bela Reka =

Bela Reka (Serbian for "White River") may refer to several places in Serbia:

- Bela Reka (Barajevo), a village in Barajevo Municipality
- Bela Reka (Ripanj), a neighborhood in Voždovac Municipality
- Bela Reka (Šabac), a village in Šabac Municipality
- Gornja Bela Reka (Zaječar), village in Zaječar Municipality
- Donja Bela Reka (Bor), a village in Bor Municipality
- Gornja Bela Reka (Nova Varoš), a village in Nova Varoš Municipality
- Donja Bela Reka (Nova Varoš), a village in Nova Varoš Municipality

or:

- Bela Reka Lake, a lake in Voždovac Municipality

== See also ==
- Bela River (disambiguation)
- Byala Reka (disambiguation)
- Belareca, a river in Caraș-Severin County, Romania
- Bijela Rijeka (disambiguation), similar name
