= Blanco River =

Blanco River may refer to:

== Guatemala ==
- Blanco River (San Marcos)

== Honduras ==
- Blanco River (Honduras)

== Mexico ==
- Blanco River (Veracruz)

== United States ==
- Blanco River (Texas)
- Blanco River (Lares, Puerto Rico)
- Blanco River (Naguabo, Puerto Rico)

== See also ==
- Río Blanco (disambiguation)
- Rivière Blanche (disambiguation)
- White River (disambiguation)
