= Manouane (disambiguation) =

Manouane is an alternative spelling of Manawan, a First Nations reserve is Quebec, Canada.

Manouane may also refer to:

- Lake Manouane (La Tuque), Quebec
- Manouane River (La Tuque), Quebec

== See also ==
- List of places named Manouane
