= Donja Bela Reka =

Donja Bela Reka may refer to:

- Donja Bela Reka (Bor), a village in Bar Municipality, Serbia
- Donja Bela Reka (Nova Varoš), a village in Nova Varoš Municipality, Serbia

== See also ==
- Gornja Bela Reka (disambiguation)
- Bela Reka (disambiguation)
