= Sincennes Township =

Coordinates: 47°29′00″N 73°55′00″W

Sincennes Township (French: Canton Sincennes) is located in the unorganized territory of Lac-Normand, in Mekinac Regional County Municipality, in Mauricie, in the province of Quebec, in Canada. This uninhabited township was incorporated on December 18, 1965 by the Government of Quebec. Sincennes Township has forestry and tourism including hunting, fishing, water sports, ATVs, snowmobiles. Historically, logging was the economic engine of the region.

== Geography ==
The township covers 32,375 hectares. This area is located between the city of La Tuque and village of Parent.

Lakes Sincennes and Mondonac are the major lakes in the township. The highest peak of the township tops at 563 m. The township is part of watershed sub-basin of the Manouane River (La Tuque) which flows eastward in Upper-Mauricie. The latter river is connected to the drainage system Saint-Maurice River. Secondary roads provide access to various extensive water in the Township.

== Toponymy ==
The designation of Township honours Jacques-Félix Sincennes (1818-1876), a businessman whose ancestors are of Acadian origin. He was born in Deschambault, located southwest of Quebec City. He was Conservative MP for Richelieu in the Union (1858-1861). This businessman is best known as co-founder of a shipping and towing company Sincennes MacNaughton-Line and director of the company Richelieu. In 1875, he created, with a competitor, the navigation company Richelieu and the Ontario, which will become the Canada Steamship Lines in 1913. Acadians named Sincennes or Saincennes, are originated in particular Saint-Seine-Abbey, Burgundian village where a holy man named Seine founded a monastery in the 6th century, near the sources of La Seine, the famous French River.

The name "Sincennes Township" was recorded on December 5, 1968 in the register of Quebec place names of the Commission de toponymie du Québec (Geographical Names Board of Québec).

=== See also ===
- Manouane River (La Tuque)
- Saint-Maurice River
- Mondonac River
- Châteauvert Lake (La Tuque)
- Manouane Lake (La Tuque)
- Sincennes Lake
- Mondonac Lake
- La Tuque (urban agglomeration)
- Zec Frémont
- Mauricie
- Lanaudière
- Mékinac Regional County Municipality
- Quebec Townships
- Jacques-Félix Sincennes, a businessman and MLA
