= Gornja Bela Reka =

Gornja Bela Reka may refer to:

- Gornja Bela Reka (Zaječar), a village in Zaječar Municipality, Serbia
- Gornja Bela Reka (Nova Varoš), a village in Nova Varoš Municipality, Serbia

== See also ==
- Donja Bela Reka (disambiguation)
- Bela Reka (disambiguation)
