= Mondonac Lake =

Lake Mondonac
- Location within Quebec
- Location: Quebec
- Coordinates: 47°24′17″N 73°58′04″W
- Type: River Lake
- Primary outflows: Châteauvert Lake (La Tuque), Manouane River (La Tuque)
- Basin countries: Canada
- Max. length: 15 km (9.3 mi)
- Max. width: 6 km (4 mi)
- Surface area: 23.13 km^{2} (8.93 sq mi)
- Max. depth: 100 m (330 ft)
- Water volume: 60,138,000 m^{3} (2.1238×10^{9} cu ft)

The Lake Mondonac (variant "Mondonak") is located in Zec Fremont, in Matawinie, near the boundary of the region Lanaudière and Mauricie, in Quebec, in Canada.

== Geography ==
Mondonac lake is located at 10 km (direct line), northeast of Kempt Lake (Matawinie) and at 56 km north of Taureau Reservoir. The mouth of Lake Mondonac is located 85 km west of La Tuque. With a length of 15 km and a maximum width of 6 km (due to a large bay on northwest side), Mondonac lake has an area of more than 23 km². It is located in the southwest part of the township of Sincennes. Mondonac lake whose depth reaches 100 m, collects water from several surrounding lakes, including Lake Salone, its neighbor to the south-east and the mouth of which is 10.5 km from the southern part of Lake Mondonac. It receives waters of ten highest lakes including: Crane, Miror, Saracen, Rosette, Comfort, Cormorant and Kasesekatikwakawarik.

The mouth of Lake Mondonac is located at the bottom of a long bay at northeast. The river Mondonac that forms the outlet of the lake, flows north, collecting the waters of Lake Sincennes, then flows into the Châteauvert Lake (La Tuque). In May 2010, a large forest fire occurred around Lake Mondonac.

Dam Mondonac

Property of Hydro-Québec, the dam at the mouth of Lake Mondonac in Fremont Zec is considered high capacity. It is mostly used for wildlife. At a height of 3.2 m. and a dam height of 2.6 m., the dam was originally built in 1944 and modified in 1998. It was built with wooden boxes filled with stones, and foundations are based on the rock. The catchment area is 328 km². Retained its capacity is 60,138,000 m³. The area of the reservoir is 2313 ha. The length of the structure is 30 m.

== Toponymy ==
This name Mondonac originates from an Algonquin word meaning "region of souls or spirits".

The specific Mondonac - or graphical variant "Mondonak" - appears on various documents at least since the second half of the nineteenth century. The surveyors report L.-A.-O. Arcand and E.B. Temple, in 1869, indicate the name "River Mondenak". While the regional surveyor Arcand, in 1870, wrote "Lake Mondonac". This lake is also called "Lake Ktsi Môdonagok", "great Mondonakw" in Abenaki and Mantonoko lake marine monsters in Atikamekw. According to Indian mythology, several imaginary creatures have inhabited this lake which is located entirely in forest regions.

The name "Lake Mondonac" was recorded December 5, 1968, at the Bank of place names in Commission de toponymie du Québec (Geographical Names Board of Québec).

== See also ==
- Manouane River (La Tuque)
- Saint-Maurice River
- Kekeo River (La Tuque)
- Mondonac River
- Châteauvert Lake (La Tuque)
- Manouane Lake (La Tuque)
- Kempt Lake (Matawinie)
- La Tuque (urban agglomeration)
- Zec Frémont
- Mauricie
- Lanaudière
- Manawane, Canadian Indian reserve
