= List of places named Manouane =

Manouane (including Manawan) may also refer to:

== Toponymes ==
Canada (in Quebec)

Toponym	Municipality	MRC	Administrative Region	Coordinates
Manouane (Post office)	Manawan (Indian Reserve (Canada))	Matawinie	Lanaudière	47° 13' 16"; 74° 23' 23"
Manouane (Place called)	La Tuque (City)	Haute-Mauricie	Mauricie	47° 53' 31"; 73° 48' 23"
Manawan (Indian Reserve (Canada))		Matawinie	Lanaudière	47° 13' 00"; 74° 23' 00"
Manouane, Dam of	Mont-Valin, Quebec (unorganized territory)	Le Fjord-du-Saguenay Regional County Municipality	Saguenay–Lac-Saint-Jean	50°39' 28"; 70° 31' 44"
Manouane, Spillway	Mont-Valin, Quebec (unorganized territory)	Le Fjord-du-Saguenay Regional County Municipality	Saguenay–Lac-Saint-Jean	50° 39' 28"; 70° 31' 44"
Manouane Lake (Mont-Valin)	Mont-Valin, Quebec (unorganized territory)	Le Fjord-du-Saguenay Regional County Municipality	Saguenay–Lac-Saint-Jean	50° 42' 18"; 70° 44' 57"
Lake Manouane (La Tuque)	La Tuque (City)	La Tuque	Mauricie	47° 33' 54"; 74° 06' 49"
Petite rivière Manouane	Mont-Valin, Quebec (unorganized territory)	Le Fjord-du-Saguenay Regional County Municipality	Saguenay–Lac-Saint-Jean	49° 58' 19"; 70° 53' 55"
Manouane River (Péribonka River)	Mont-Valin, Quebec (unorganized territory)	Le Fjord-du-Saguenay Regional County Municipality	Saguenay–Lac-Saint-Jean	49° 30' 21"; 71° 10' 32"
Manouane River (La Tuque)	La Tuque (City)	La Tuque	Mauricie	47° 53' 48"; 73° 48' 24"
Manouane, Rue de la	Terrebonne, Quebec (Ville)	Les Moulins	Lanaudière	45° 42' 00"; 73° 38' 00"
Manouane, Rue de la	Saguenay (City)(Chicoutimi)	Saguenay, Quebec	Saguenay–Lac-Saint-Jean	48° 25' 00"; 71° 04' 00"
Manouane-4, Digue de	Mont-Valin, Quebec (unorganized territory)	Le Fjord-du-Saguenay Regional County Municipality	Saguenay–Lac-Saint-Jean	50° 37' 42"; 70° 31' 40"
Manouane-A, Barrage de la	Baie-Obaoca, Quebec (unorganized territory)	Matawinie	Lanaudière	47° 32' 14"; 74° 11' 07"
Manouane-B, Barrage de la	La Tuque (City)	La Tuque	Mauricie	47° 37' 55"; 74° 00' 05"
Manouane-B, Digue de la	La Tuque (City)	La Tuque	Mauricie	47° 38' 05"; 74° 00' 00"
Manouane-C, Dam	La Tuque (City)	La Tuque	Mauricie	
