= Pierre River (Mitchinamecus River tributary) =

River in Lanaudière, Quebec, Canada

Saint-Michel River

Location
- Country: Canada
- Province: Quebec
- Region: Lanaudière
- Regional County Municipality: Matawinie Regional County Municipality

Physical characteristics
- Source: Lake Pierre
  - location: Baie-Obaoca
  - coordinates: 47.65150°N 74.63949°W
  - elevation: 451 m (1,480 ft)
- Mouth: Mitchinamecus River
  - location: Baie-Obaoca
  - coordinates: 47.67389°N 74.69666°W
  - elevation: 423 m (1,388 ft)
- Length: 12.9 km (8.0 mi)

Basin features
- Tributaries
  - left: (Upward from the mouth) Discharge of lakes Green and Clair.
  - right: (Upward from the mouth) Discharge of Paul Lake

The Pierre River is a tributary of the Mitchinamecus River which is a tributary of the rivière du Lièvre, flowing in the unorganized territory of Baie-Obaoca, in the Matawinie Regional County Municipality, in the administrative region of Lanaudière, in the province of Quebec, in Canada.

The Pierre river flows entirely in the forest zone. From the middle of 19th century, forestry was the dominant economic activity in the sector; recreational tourism, second.

The lower part of this small valley is served by the Chemin de Parent.

The river surface is generally frozen from mid-November to the end of April. Safe circulation on the ice is generally done from the end of December to the beginning of March. The water level of the river varies with the seasons and the precipitation.

== Geography ==
The watersheds neighboring the Pierre River are:

- north side: Mitchinamecus River;
- east side: Lac de la Souris, lac Pothole;
- south side: Lake Wagwabika, Lake Nemiscachingue, Lake Pothole;
- west side: long lake, Mitchinamecus River.

Lake Pierre (length: 7.9 kilometres (4.9 mi); width: 1.3 kilometres (0.81 mi); altitude: 451 metres (1,480 ft)) constitutes the head water of the Pierre river. It includes several marsh areas, especially on the south side and at the ends. It is supplied from the north by two lake outlets, four streams, as well as the outlet of eight lakes; and on the south side by the outlet (which empties into Sandy Bay, located at the far east of the lake) from seven lakes. Its mouth is located on the north shore of the western part of the lake.

From the mouth (located to the south) of Lake Pierre, the Pierre River flows over 3.5 kilometres (2.2 mi), with a drop of 28 metres (92 ft), according to the following segments:

- 1.9 kilometres (1.2 mi) to the west by collecting the outlet (coming from the north) from Lac Paul, to the outlet (coming from the south) from Clair and Green lakes;
- 1.6 kilometres (0.99 mi) towards the north, bending towards the west at the end of the segment to go and cut the Chemin de Parent (north–south direction), to its mouth.

The Pierre river flows on the east bank of the Mitchinamecus River, in the southern part of Lac Long which is formed by a widening of the river. From there, the current crosses Long Lake to the southwest on 1 kilometre (0.62 mi), then follows the course of the Mitchinamecus River on 111.3 kilometres (69.2 mi), then the course of the river du Lièvre on which flows onto the north bank of the Ottawa River.

== Toponymy ==
The toponym "Rivière Pierre" was formalized on January 24, 1992 at the Place Names Bank of the Commission de toponymie du Québec.

== See also ==
- Matawinie Regional County Municipality
- Baie-Obaoca, a TNO
- Mitchinamecus River
- Rivière du Lièvre, a stream
- Ottawa River, a stream
- Mitchinamecus Reservoir, a body of water
- List of rivers of Quebec
