= Sincennes =

The term Sincennes can refer to:

- Jacques-Félix Sincennes (1818-1876), businessman and Conservative MP for Richelieu in the Union (1858-1861).
- Sincennes Township, located in the province of Quebec, Canada.
