= Termen-Yelga =

Termen-Yelga may refer to:

- Termen-Yelga River, a river in the Republic of Bashkortostan, Russia
- Termen-Yelga Microdistrict, a microdistrict of the town of Ishimbay, Republic of Bashkortostan, Russia
