= Mitchinamecus =

Mitchinamecus may refer to:

- Zec Mitchinamecus, a controlled harvesting zone in Quebec, Canada
- Mitchinamecus River, in Quebec, Canada
- Mitchinamecus Reservoir, on the Mitchinamecus River in Quebec, Canada
