= Smakayevo Microdistrict =

Microdistrict in Ishimbay, Bashkortostan, Russia

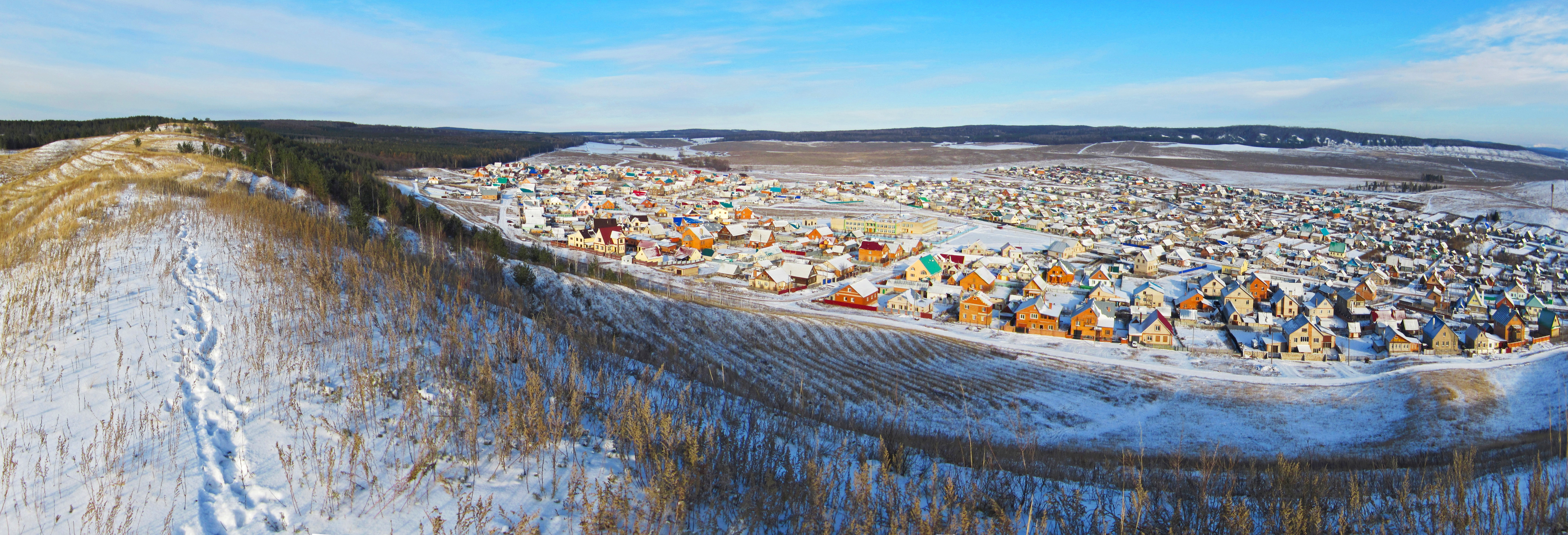
Panorama of Smakayevo Microdistrict

Smakayevo (Russian: Смакаево) is a microdistrict in the town of Ishimbay, Republic of Bashkortostan, Russia. It is located on the banks of the Buzaygyr stream, formerly a small river and a tributary of the Tayruk River.

== History ==
Since 1795, Smakayevo has been recorded as a village of the Bashkir tribe Yurmaty, one of the major tribal groupings of the Bashkir people of the southern Ural Mountains. The Yurmaty are one of more than 50 Bashkir tribal groups historically present in the region. Their dialect, known as Yurmatin or Steppe Bashkir, is spoken in the southern steppes of Bashkortostan. Following the fall of Kazan in 1552, the Bashkir tribes, including the Yurmaty, came under Russian sovereignty and confirmed their patrimonial rights to their traditional lands. After the seizure of Kazan, some Yurmaty tribes were resettled in lands on the left bank of the Srednyaya Belaya River, vacated after the departure of the Nogais from the region.

At the time of its earliest recorded population data in 1795, the village contained 18 houses and 85 people. Over the following century, the settlement grew steadily. By 1920, the population had reached 396 people living in 79 houses, reflecting broader demographic changes across the Ishimbay region during this period.

In the 20th century, the area around Smakayevo underwent significant transformation following the discovery of oil in the Ishimbay region. The first oil field in the Volga-Ural region was commissioned in 1932, leading to rapid industrialisation of Ishimbay and its surrounding areas. The first oil refinery in the region began operations in 1936. As Ishimbay grew into an industrial city, Smakayevo became incorporated as a microdistrict within its administrative boundaries.

== Geography ==
Smakayevo is situated within the town of Ishimbay, which lies approximately 166 kilometres south of Ufa, the capital of the Republic of Bashkortostan, in the foothills of the southern Ural Mountains. Ishimbay sits on the banks of the Belaya River and the Tayruk River. The Buzaygyr stream, on the banks of which Smakayevo is located, flows into the Tayruk River, which in turn is a tributary of the Belaya River. The Belaya River is one of the major rivers of Bashkortostan and runs through several key industrial cities of the republic including Ishimbay, Salavat, and Sterlitamak. The climate of the area is continental, with cold winters and warm summers. Average temperatures range from around minus 12.3 degrees Celsius in January to 20.3 degrees Celsius in July, with an average annual temperature of approximately 3.31 degrees Celsius.

== Population ==
The following table shows the recorded population of Smakayevo from 1795 to 1920, based on historical census data:

Year	Houses	People
1795	18	85
1834	15	108
1859	20	142
1885	36	220
1920	79	396

== Administrative Context ==
Ishimbay, within which Smakayevo is a microdistrict, serves as the administrative centre of Ishimbaysky District in the Republic of Bashkortostan, though the town itself is administered separately as a town of republic significance. As a municipal division, it is incorporated within Ishimbaysky Municipal District as Ishimbay Urban Settlement. According to the 2010 Russian census, the population of Ishimbay was 66,259 people. Ishimbay, along with Salavat and Sterlitamak, forms part of the South Bashkortostan polycentric agglomeration, which has a combined population of approximately 700,000 people.

== See also ==
- Ishimbay
- Republic of Bashkortostan
- Bashkirs
- Yurmaty
- Belaya River
- Ural Mountains
