= Kalachev Bridge =

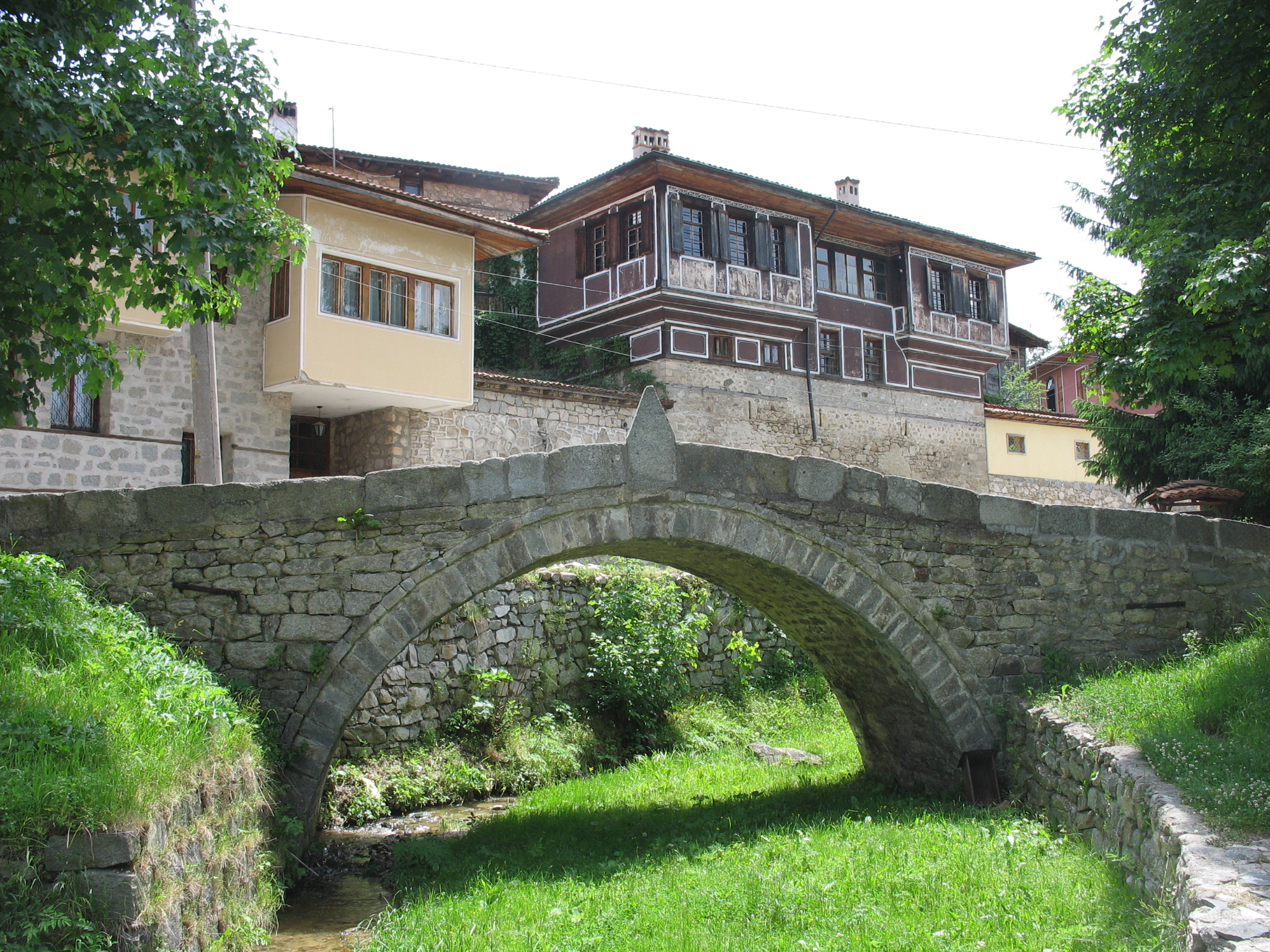
- Coordinates: 42°38′15″N 24°21′23″E
- Carries: pedestrians
- Crosses: the Byala reka
- Locale: Koprivshtitsa, Bulgaria

Characteristics
- Total length: 10 m

History
- Opened: 1813

Location
- Interactive map of Kalachev Bridge

The Kalachev Bridge (Bulgarian: Калъчев мост, Stambolovya most) is a bridge in the town of Koprivshtitsa, Bulgaria.

On this bridge the first gun of the April Uprising of 1876 thunders.
