= Río Blanco =

Río Blanco (Spanish for "White River") may refer to:

== Argentina ==
- Río Blanco (Argentina)
- Río Blanco (Río de los Patos)

== Belize ==
- Rio Blanco (Belize)

== Bolivia ==
- Río Blanco (Bolivia), a tributary of the Rio Guaporé

== Chile ==
- Río Blanco (Aconcagua)
- Río Blanco (Ajatama)
- Río Blanco (Loa)
- Río Blanco (Chollay)

== Guatemala ==
- Río Blanco, San Marcos

== Mexico ==
- Río Blanco, Chiapas
- Río Blanco, Oaxaca
- Río Blanco, Veracruz, a city
- Río Blanco (Veracruz), a river

== Nicaragua ==
- Río Blanco, Matagalpa

== Peru ==
- Rio Blanco mine, a copper mine in Loreto Region
- Río Blanco or Yuraqmayu, a river in the Lima Region, Peru

== Puerto Rico ==
- Río Blanco (Naguabo, Puerto Rico)
- Río Blanco (Ponce, Puerto Rico), a tributary of the Río Prieto

== Spain ==
- Río Blanco, Granada, a river in Sierra de Cogollos

== United States ==
- Rio Blanco (Colorado), a tributary of the San Juan River
- Rio Blanco County, Colorado
- Rio Blanco Oil Shale Company
- Blanco River (Texas), a tributary of the San Marcos River

== Uruguay ==
- Río Branco, Uruguay, a city in Cerro Largo Department

== See also ==
- White River (disambiguation)
- Blanco River (disambiguation)
- Rivière Blanche (disambiguation)
