= Mitchinamecus River =

River in La Tuque, Lanaudière and Laurentides, Quebec, Canada

Location
- Country: Canada
- Province: Quebec
- Region: Lanaudière
- Regional County Municipality: La Tuque, Antoine-Labelle Regional County Municipality and Matawinie Regional County Municipality

Physical characteristics
- Source: Lake Head
  - location: Baie-Obaoca (TNO)
  - coordinates: 47.77583°N 74.61028°W
  - elevation: 562 m (1,844 ft)
- Mouth: Rivière du Lièvre
  - location: Lac-Oscar (TNO)
  - coordinates: 47.06556°N 75.10972°W
  - elevation: 254 m (833 ft)
- Length: 127.2 km (79.0 mi)

Basin features
- Tributaries
  - left: (Upward from the mouth) Connor Creek, Louise Creek, Nottaway Creek, Cowans Creek.
  - right: (Upward from the mouth) Sam Creek, McLean Creek, Cerise Creek, Torniche Creek, Sand Creek, Pierre River (Mitchinamecus River).

The Mitchinamecus River is a watercourse of the North Shore of St. Lawrence River, in the province of Quebec, in Canada. The current of this river crosses the territory of:

- the city of La Tuque, in Mauricie;
- the unorganized territories of Baie-Obaoca, in Matawinie Regional County Municipality, in Lanaudière administrative region;
- the unorganized territories of Lac-Oscar, in Antoine-Labelle Regional County Municipality), in the administrative region of Laurentides.

== Geography ==
The Mitchinamecus River originates at the southern limit of the township of Dandurand and south of the municipality of Parent, in Haut-Saint-Maurice, in Mauricie. Head Lake (altitude: 562 metres (1,844 ft), U-shaped) constitutes the head lake of the Mitchinamecus River. Head Lake is located 6.2 kilometres (3.9 mi) south of a bay in Dandurand Lake (altitude: 423 metres (1,388 ft)), west of Margaret Lake (altitude: 561 metres (1,841 ft)), and 27.5 kilometres (17.1 mi) southeast of the village of Parent, 31 kilometres (19 mi) at northwest of Manouane Lake and 44.1 kilometres (27.4 mi) north of Mitchinamecus Reservoir.

The main watersheds around the head of the Mitchinamecus River are;

- in the North: Lac Dandurand which is a tributary of the Bazin River;
- to the east: Pierre River, Cabasta River, Némiscachingue River; Adam River;
- to the south: Rivière du Lièvre;
- to the west: Bazin River.

River course downstream from Height Lake (23.8 km segment)

From the mouth west of Height Lake, the Mitchinamecus River flows over:

- 4.9 kilometres (3.0 mi) towards the northwest by collecting the waters of Lac du Portage (altitude: 528 metres (1,732 ft), coming from the north), up to the outlet of Lac Hull ( altitude: 497 metres (1,631 ft));
- 5.2 kilometres (3.2 mi) westward, to the outlet of Head Lake (altitude: 448 metres (1,470 ft)), of Lac Aigu (altitude: 461 metres (1,512 ft)) and Lake Hare (altitude: 486 metres (1,594 ft));
- 2.6 kilometres (1.6 mi) south-west, to the mouth of Totem Lake which the current crosses on 0.6 kilometres (0.37 mi);
- 1.2 kilometres (0.75 mi) south-west, to the mouth of Lac de la Tanière which the current crosses on 310 metres (1,020 ft);
- 1.1 kilometres (0.68 mi) south-west, up to the road bridge connecting the two shores in a strait of Long Lake (altitude: 427 metres (1,401 ft)). Note: Long Lake receives on its east shore the Pierre River;
- 7.9 kilometres (4.9 mi) to the southwest, crossing Long Lake over its full length. This 9.0 kilometres (5.6 mi) long lake is an extension of the Mitchinamecus River.

Course of the river downstream from Lac Long (78.3 km segment)

From the dam located at the mouth southwest of the long lake, the Mitchinamecus river flows over:

- 11.5 metres (38 ft) towards the south-west, crossing several lakes which constitute an enlargement of the river, up to the outlet of Slow Lake (altitude: 427 metres (1,401 ft)) and Peabody (altitude: 432 metres (1,417 ft)), coming from the south-east;
- 1.0 kilometre (0.62 mi) south-west to the outlet of Basset lakes (altitude: 473 metres (1,552 ft)), Fleet (altitude: 477 metres (1,565 ft)) and Georges (altitude: 480 metres (1,570 ft)), coming from the north;
- 1.3 kilometres (0.81 mi) south-west to the outlet of Lac Tournière (altitude: 445 metres (1,460 ft)), coming from the south;
- 1.6 kilometres (0.99 mi) south-west to the outlet of Lac Mignarde (altitude: 402 metres (1,319 ft)), coming from the north;
- 7.5 kilometres (4.7 mi) (or 4.4 kilometres (2.7 mi) in a direct line) towards the south-west, forming numerous streamers, up to the outlet of Lakes Armature, Barils, Team, Jacynthe, René and Dan, from the northwest;
- 9.6 kilometres (6.0 mi) (4.8 kilometres (3.0 mi) in a direct line) south-west, forming numerous streamers, to the outlet of Leluau lake, coming from the east;
- 7.9 kilometres (4.9 mi) (3.8 kilometres (2.4 mi) in a direct line) westward, forming numerous streamers, to the northeast shore of the north bay of Mitchinamecus reservoir;
- 2.5 kilometres (1.6 mi) crossing to the southwest the north bay of the Mitchinamecus reservoir, to the Dépôt-Carrier bridge;
- 35.4 kilometres (22.0 mi) towards the southwest crossing the Mitchinamecus reservoir, up to Mitchinamecus Dam.

River course downstream of the Mitchinamecus Reservoir (25.1 km segment)

From the dam at the mouth to the south of the Mitchinamecus reservoir, the river flows on:

- 1.2 kilometres (0.75 mi) east to the outlet of Nottaway Creek;
- 3.9 kilometres (2.4 mi) southwards, to the outlet of Lac de la Loutre;
- 0.7 kilometres (0.43 mi) south-east, up to Rascas Falls;
- 9.5 kilometres (5.9 mi) south, to Louise stream, coming from the east;
- 4.8 kilometres (3.0 mi) southeasterly, up to Cannor stream, coming from the east;
- 3.9 kilometres (2.4 mi) southwest, to Matts Creek;
- 1.1 kilometres (0.68 mi) south-west, to the mouth of the Mitchinamecus river which flows into the Lièvre river which forms a large loop at this point. This confluence is designated "Les Fourches".

From the Mitchinamecus reservoir, the Mitchinamecus river crosses several rapids and falls, in particular: fall of the Broken Lady, the Carrier rapids, the Rascas Falls (from 200 metres (660 ft) downstream from Cerise stream) and the Long Rapids. The lower segments of the Mitchinamecus River are navigated by canoeists in whitewater.

== Toponymy ==
The term Mitchinamecus refers to a zec, a river, a reservoir and a dam.

Formerly, the Mitchinamecus river was also designated:

- Otter river and Macamekosi Sipi. This toponym appears in the official documentation in 1911. Of Cree origin, this toponym means "large trout", of misinamecus, formed of mis, large, large and namecus, trout.
- Mashamengoose river, sometimes spelled Menjobabuse.

The toponym Rivière Mitchinamecus was formalized on September 12, 1986 at the Bank of Place Names of the Commission de toponymie du Québec.

== See also ==
- Mitchinamecus Reservoir, a body of water
- Rivière du Lièvre, a stream
- Pierre River, a stream
- Matawinie Regional County Municipality
- Baie-Obaoca, an unorganized territory
- List of rivers of Quebec
