= White River =

White River may refer to:

== Bodies of water ==
=== Africa ===
- Bakoy River, in West Africa, called the White River over a portion of its length

=== Canada ===
- White River (British Columbia)
- White River (Vancouver Island), a river in the Discovery Passage–Johnstone Strait watersheds of British Columbia
  - White River Provincial Park
- White River (Nass River), a river in the Marcus Passage watershed of British Columbia
- White River (Quebec)
- White River (Yukon)
- White River (Ontario)

=== China ===
- White River (China), an old name for the Hai River

=== Dominica ===
- White River (Dominica)

=== Estonia ===
- Valgejõgi, or "white river", in northern Estonia

=== Iran ===
- Sefīd-Rūd, or "the white river", in Gilan province

=== Jamaica ===
- White River (Jamaica), a river

=== New Zealand ===
- White River, New Zealand, a river in the South Island

=== Montserrat ===
- White River, Montserrat, a former river in Montserrat

=== United Kingdom ===
- St Austell River, a river in Cornwall also known as the White River

=== United States ===
- White River (Arizona), a tributary of the Salt River
- White River (Arkansas–Missouri), a tributary of the Mississippi River in Arkansas and southern Missouri
- White River (California), in Tulare County
- White River (Indiana), a large tributary of the Wabash River
- White River (White Lake), a river in Michigan
- White River (Huron County, Michigan), a tributary of Lake Huron
- White River (Nevada)
- White River (Oregon), a tributary of the Deschutes River
- White River (Missouri River tributary), a tributary of the Missouri River in Nebraska and South Dakota
- White River (Texas), a tributary of the Brazos River of Texas
- White River (Green River tributary), a tributary of the Green River in Colorado and Utah
- White River (Price River tributary), a tributary of the Price River in Utah
- White River (Vermont), a tributary of the Connecticut River
- White River (Puyallup River), a tributary of the Puyallup River in Washington State
- White River (Lake Wenatchee), a tributary of Lake Wenatchee in Washington State
- "White River", an old name of the Cuyahoga River in Ohio
- White River (Wisconsin), a tributary of the Fox River in Wisconsin

== Places ==
=== Canada ===
- White River, Ontario, a township

=== Solomon Islands ===
- White River, Honiara, the largest settlement in West Honiara

=== South Africa ===
- White River, Mpumalanga, a town in Mpumalanga Province

=== United States ===
- Whiteriver, Arizona, a census-designated place
- White River Junction, Vermont, a town where the White River flows into the Connecticut River
- White River National Forest, a national forest in northwest Colorado
- White River, South Dakota, a town in Mellette County, South Dakota
- White River State Park, an Indiana State Park just west of downtown Indianapolis
- White River (community), Wisconsin, an unincorporated community in Ashland County
- White River, Wisconsin, a town in Ashland County

== Other ==
- White River Bridge, over the White River in Mount Rainier National Park
- White River Utes, a branch of the Ute people
- White River War, an 1879 conflict between the White River Ute Indians and the United States Army

== See also ==
- White River Fauna, fossil animals discovered near White River (Missouri River tributary)
- White River Formation, a geological formation named for White River (Missouri River tributary)
- White River Township (disambiguation)
- Rivers of white, a term referring to gaps in typesetting

In other languages:

- Belaya River (disambiguation) (Russian)
- Byala Reka (disambiguation) (Bulgarian)
- Bela Reka (disambiguation) (Serbo-Croatian)
- Bijela (disambiguation) (Serbo-Croatian)
- Rivière Blanche (disambiguation) (French)
- Río Blanco (disambiguation) (Spanish)
- Belareca (Romanian)
