= Jolmaville, Wisconsin =

Census-designated place in Wisconsin, United States

- Census-designated place
- Location within Wisconsin Location within the United States
- Coordinates: 46°26′9″N 90°44′54″W
- Country: United States
- State: Wisconsin
- County: Ashland
- Towns: White River; Ashland

Area
  - Total: 12.5 sq mi (32.3 km^{2})
  - Land: 12.5 sq mi (32.3 km^{2})
  - Water: 0 sq mi (0.0 km^{2})
- Elevation: 763 ft (233 m)

Population (2020)
  - Total: 126
- Time zone: UTC-6 (Central (CST))
  - Summer (DST): UTC-5 (CDT)
- ZIP Code: 54855 (Marengo)
- Area codes: 715/534
- FIPS code: 55-38487
- GNIS feature ID: 2813410

Jolmaville is a rural community and census-designated place (CDP) in Ashland County, Wisconsin, United States. As of the 2020 census, it had a population of 126.

The community is in northern Ashland County, within the Bad River Reservation. It is bordered to the west by Marengo. Ashland, the county seat, is 16 miles (26 km) to the northwest, while Mellen is 10 miles (16 km) to the southeast.
