= Río Cubuy =

Río Cubuy is the name of several rivers in Puerto Rico:

- Río Cubuy (Loiza, Puerto Rico)
- Río Cubuy (Naguabo, Puerto Rico)
