= Termen-Yelga Microdistrict =

Coordinates: 53.3722°N 56.0695°E

Termen-Yelga (Russian: Термень-Елга) is a microdistrict of the town of Ishimbay, Republic of Bashkortostan, Russia, located in the southeastern part of the town, on the banks of the Termen-Yelga and Sarazh Rivers, and near the mountains Tashlygyrtau, Kyzyltau and Atastau.

Since 1760, Termen-Yelga has been known as a village of the Bashkir tribe Yurmaty, named Termen (Термень) and also Termen-Ilgina (Термень-Илгина). At the end of the 18th century, the population was 137.
