= Cubuy River =

Cubuy River may refer to:

- Cubuy River (Loiza, Puerto Rico)
- Cubuy River (Naguabo, Puerto Rico)
