= Icacos Petroglyph Group =

- U.S. National Register of Historic Places
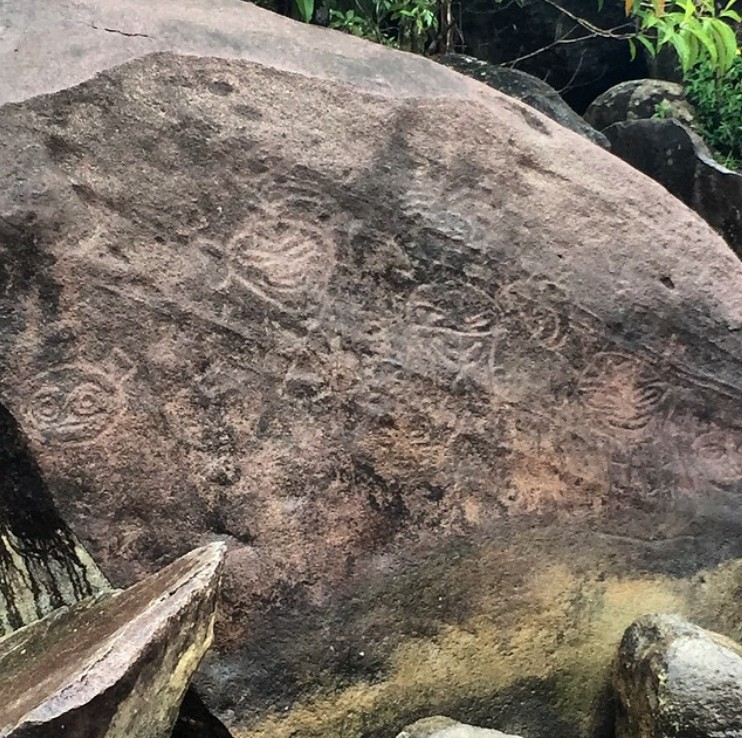
- Location: Address restricted, El Yunque National Forest
- Nearest city: Río Blanco, Naguabo, Puerto Rico
- MPS: Prehistoric Rock Art of Puerto Rico
- NRHP reference No.: 15000855
- Added to NRHP: December 1, 2015

The Icacos Petroglyph Group (Spanish: Grupo de Petroglifos de Icacos), also known as the Río Blanco Petroglyphs (Petroglifos de Río Blanco), is one of various ensembles of rock art or petroglyphs made by the pre-Columbian Taíno in the Sierra de Luquillo mountain subrange. They can be found on four large boulders located at the confluence of the Icacos and Cubuy rivers, within the El Toro Wilderness section of the El Yunque National Forest. The site and its environment are well-preserved due to their remote location and through their protection by the U.S. Forest Service. Although the address and exact coordinates are not publicly available, the site is located within the boundaries of the Río Blanco barrio of the municipality of Naguabo, Puerto Rico and can be accessed through guided tours. It has been listed in the National Register of Historic Places since 2015.

== About ==
=== Motifs ===
The petroglyphs are estimated to be relatively recent in the timeline of Indigenous inhabitation of Puerto Rico; dating based on stylistic comparison puts them as Chican Ostionoid (1200-1492) in origin. The group consists of fourteen petroglyphs that depict traditional motifs of the Taíno culture, mythology and society. The most notable motif is that of the "wrapped ancestor", popularly and erroneously called "wrapped infant", that depict a cadaver wrapped in funerary bundles as part of last rites that were described by early Spanish chroniclers such as Fray Ramón Pané. This motif has been adapted into the modern popular culture of Puerto Rico as a symbol of Taíno culture. Other notable motifs include geographical patterns, local animals and plants, and anthropomorphic faces thought to represents zemis such as Yokahu and Atabey.

=== Academic surveys ===
The earliest academic survey of the site might have happened in 1890 by French anthropologist Alphonse Pinart, although it is possible that he might have described a site that used to be located downstream along the Icacos River, closer to the main settlement of Río Blanco. Although most of these petroglyphs were lost due to erosion and human activity, some can still be admired next to Charco El Hippie. This possible site was also mentioned by American anthropologist Jesse Walter Fewkes in 1907. Most likely, Irving Rouse from Yale University was the first academic to provide a full survey of the site in 1938. Further surveys were made by Monica Flaherty Frassetto in 1960, when the individual petroglyphs were first properly traced and replicated for comparative study, and in 1979 by Juan Gonzalez who made another survey on behalf of the Puerto Rican Institute of Culture. Antonio Daubon officially inventoried the site in 1981 on behalf of the Archaeology Heritage Program of the U.S. Forest Service. Although the site is remote and protected it was the victim of an act of vandalism in 1960 when unidentified individuals carved their names in the boulder.

== See also ==
- Taíno archaeology
