= Blanche River (Ruban River tributary) =

Rivière Blanche (La Tuque)
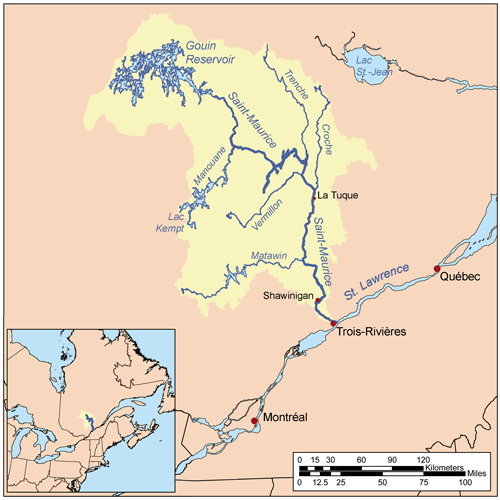

Location
- Country: Canada
- Province: Quebec
- Region: Mauricie

Physical characteristics
- Mouth: Saint-Maurice River
  - location: Manouane River (La Tuque)
  - coordinates: 47°55′50″N 74°06′05″W

The Rivière Blanche (French pronunciation: [ʁivjɛʁ blɑ̃ʃ], lit. 'White River') flows eastwards, draining the region between Casey and Wemotaci, in La Tuque, in Mauricie, Quebec, in Canada. The “Rivière Blanche” (La Tuque) is the main tributary of the Manouane River (La Tuque), and is part of the watershed of Saint-Maurice River.

== Geography ==
The White River drains dozens of lakes generally along the rail Senneterre - La Tuque, or in the area to the north of this section. This river flows entirely in forest areas. Starting from Wemotaci, Forest Road Parent - Wemotaci generally along the route of the White River, first by the south side of the river to near Casey, then the north side.

Several headwater lakes of the river are located between 16 and 28 km north of Casey, the main one being the Weectigo lake. The river then descends southward recovering the lake Guenette. Then the river veers to the east, picking up the lakes and Letondal Capimit before moving north of Casey. Note that the Letondal lake receives the waters northwest of the Ruban River. Then the White River branches off to the north, where it receives the discharge lakes Bérard and Ellwood. From there, the river forms an open south semicircle to its mouth.

Near the outlet of Lake Island (located south of Grand Lake Castor), the White River branches south to 22.5 km (direct line) from its mouth or 36.5 km (by water). In this sector, the course of the river flows south for 26 km (measured by water), then meets a winding segment 2.5 km (measured by water) which ends at 16 km from its mouth. After the winding segment, the river flows southeast to its mouth, which is located 1.6 km upstream of the mouth of Manouane River (La Tuque). For all of his career, the White River looks like figure 5 spilled on the left.

== Toponymy ==
The name "Rivière Blanche" (La Tuque) was officially registered on December 5, 1968, at the Bank of place names of the Commission de toponymie du Québec (Geographical Names Board of Québec).

== See also ==
=== See also ===
- Saint-Maurice River
- La Tuque
- La Tuque (urban agglomeration)
- Wemotaci (reserve)
- Manouane River (La Tuque)
- Ruban River, a tributary of the Rivière Blanche (La Tuque)
