= Marengo, Wisconsin =

- Town
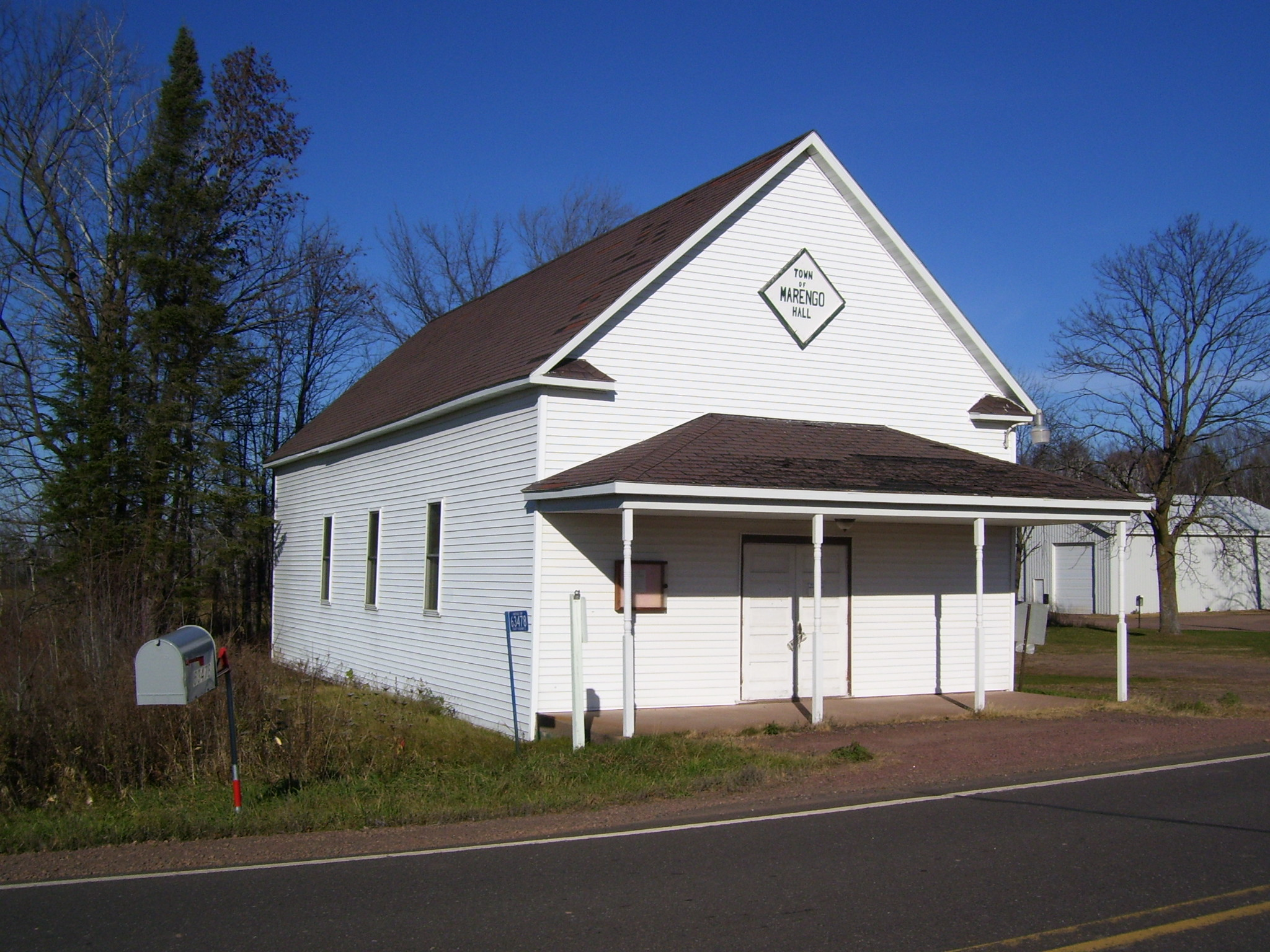
- The Marengo Town Hall

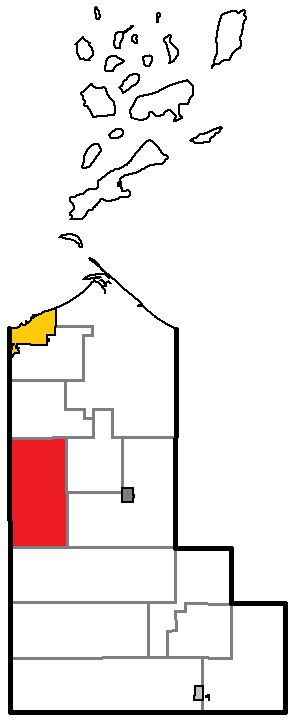
- Location of Marengo, within Ashland County, Wisconsin
- Coordinates: 46°19′39″N 90°51′42″W
- Country: United States
- State: Wisconsin
- County: Ashland

Area
  - Total: 72.4 sq mi (187.6 km^{2})
  - Land: 71.5 sq mi (185.2 km^{2})
  - Water: 0.93 sq mi (2.4 km^{2})
- Elevation: 1,332 ft (406 m)

Population (2020)
  - Total: 460
  - Density: 6.4/sq mi (2.5/km^{2})
- Time zone: UTC-6 (Central (CST))
  - Summer (DST): UTC-5 (CDT)
- Area codes: 715 & 534
- FIPS code: 55-49200
- GNIS feature ID: 1583651
- Website: https://marengo-township.org/

Marengo is a town in Ashland County in the U.S. state of Wisconsin. The population was 460 at the 2020 census.

== History ==
In 1849, Charles Whittlesey named the adjacent river as the Maringouin Fork of the Bad River:

“The second branch [of the Bad River] from the west having, as I could learn, no name, I have called it the ‘Maringouin Fork‘ in my map in commemoration of the myriads of mosquitoes that inhabit its banks, that being the name the half-breed French give to those pests of the Bad River region. The Maringouin has its sources near Long Lake, on the west, and on the south interlocks with the upper branches of the Chippewa River, among some lakes, enclosed by drift ridges, which are, by barometrical measurement, eight hundred and seventy-one feet above Lake Superior.”

== Geography ==
The town of Marengo is located in northwestern Ashland County, south of the town of White River, west of the towns of Ashland and Morse, and north of the town of Gordon. To the west are the towns of Grandview and Lincoln in Bayfield County. The Brunsweiler River, a tributary of the Marengo River and thence the Bad River, flows south to north through the town, passing through several small lakes.

According to the United States Census Bureau, the town has a total area of 72.4 square miles (187.6 km^{2}), of which 71.5 square miles (185.2 km^{2}) is land and 0.93 square miles (2.4 km^{2}), or 1.26%, is water.

== Demographics ==
Historical population
Census	Pop.	Note	%±
1910	500		—
1920	786		57.2%
1930	514		−34.6%
1940	548		6.6%
1950	437		−20.3%
1960	342		−21.7%
1970	257		−24.9%
1980	276		7.4%
1990	284		2.9%
2000	362		27.5%
2010	390		7.7%
2020	460		17.9%
U.S. Decennial Census

As of the census of 2000, there were 362 people, 132 households, and 99 families residing in the town. The population density was 5.1 people per square mile (2.0/km^{2}). There were 191 housing units at an average density of 2.7 per square mile (1.0/km^{2}). The racial makeup of the town was 96.96% White, 2.49% Native American, 0.28% Asian and 0.28% Pacific Islander. Hispanic or Latino of any race were 0.28% of the population. 32.5% were of Finnish, 23.8% German, 6.5% Swedish, 5.9% United States or American, and 5.6% Norwegian ancestry according to Census 2000.

There were 132 households, out of which 40.2% had children under the age of 18 living with them, 62.1% were married couples living together, 8.3% had a female householder with no husband present, and 25.0% were non-families. 21.2% of all households were made up of individuals, and 7.6% had someone living alone who was 65 years of age or older. The average household size was 2.74 and the average family size was 3.19.

In the town, the population was spread out, with 32.0% under the age of 18, 5.8% from 18 to 24, 27.1% from 25 to 44, 23.8% from 45 to 64, and 11.3% who were 65 years of age or older. The median age was 35 years. For every 100 females, there were 104.5 males. For every 100 females age 18 and over, there were 103.3 males.

The median income for a household in the town was $33,036, and the median income for a family was $34,861. Males had a median income of $31,250 versus $17,188 for females. The per capita income for the town was $16,487. About 10.7% of families and 14.0% of the population were below the poverty line, including 14.8% of those under age 18 and 16.7% of those age 65 or over.
