= Bela River =

Bela River may refer to:

- Belá, a river in Slovakia
- River Bela, a river in southern Cumbria, England
- River Belah, a river in eastern Cumbria, England

== See also ==
- Bijela River (disambiguation)
- White River (disambiguation)
