= Châteauvert Lake =

Reservoir in La Tuque, Quebec, Canada

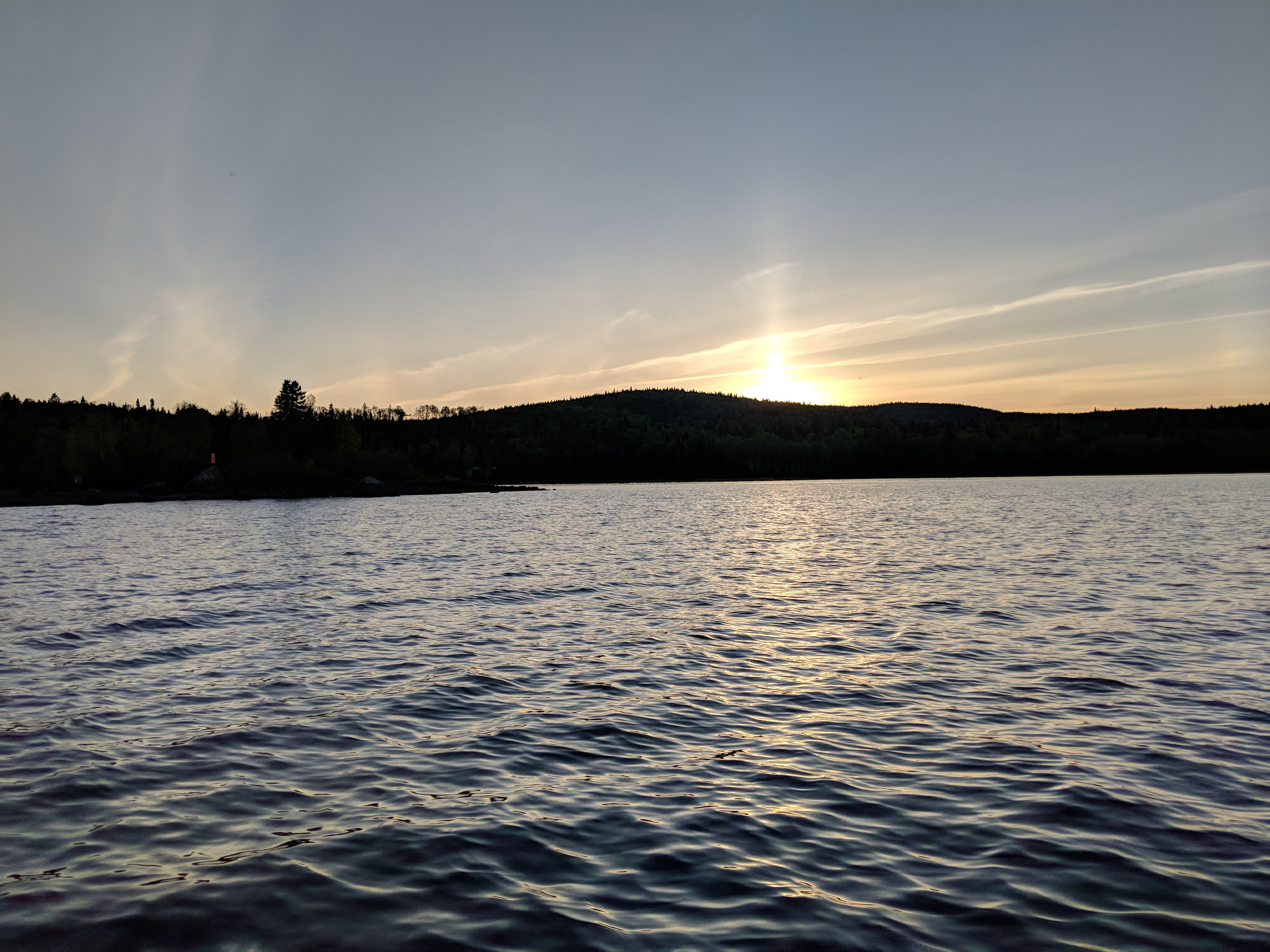

- Location within Quebec
- Location: La Tuque, Quebec
- Coordinates: 47°39′24″N 73°55′15″W
- Type: reservoir contained by a dam
- Primary inflows: Manouane River
- Primary outflows: Manouane River
- Catchment area: 456 km^{2} (176 sq mi)
- Basin countries: Canada
- Water volume: 0.26982 km^{3} (218,750 acre⋅ft)
- Settlements: La Tuque

The Lake Châteauvert is located on the path of the Manouane River (La Tuque), at the west of Saint-Maurice River in the territory of La Tuque, in Mauricie, in Quebec, in Canada.

== Toponymy ==
The name "Lake Châteauvert" was recorded on December 5, 1968, at the Bank of place names of Commission de toponymie du Québec (Geographical Names Board of Québec)

== Geography ==
Located entirely in forest area, the lake is formed Châteauvert any length, in the north–south axis. It receives water by:

- West, the discharge of Lake Manouane, which receives its waters from Kempt Lake (Matawinie);
- Center-west, the discharge of "Kekeo River (La Tuque)";
- South, the river Mondonac which is fed by lakes Sincennes and Mondonac.

The outlet of Lake Châteauvert is the Manouane River (La Tuque) at the north end. A high-capacity dam owned by Hydro-Québec is located at the mouth. The dam built in 1952 (concrete-gravity type) has a height of 14 m and a retention height of 12.5 m. The catchment area of the dam is 456 km^{2}. Its holding capacity is 269,820,000 m^{3}. This dam is designated "Manouance -C"

Coming from Wemotaci, a forest road crosses the Manouane River (La Tuque) at the top of the dam Manouane-C, and then moves to the west by the north shore of Lake Châteauvert.

== See also ==
- Manouane River (La Tuque)
- Saint-Maurice River
- Lake Manouane
- Kempt Lake (Matawinie)
- La Tuque
- Mauricie
- Manawan, Canadian Indian reserve
