= Bijela =

Bijela (which translates to White from Serbo-Croatian), or also Bijela rijeka in case of rivers, may refer to:

- Bijela, Herceg Novi, a village in Montenegro
- Bijela, Brčko, a village in Bosnia and Herzegovina
- Bijela, Jablanica, a village in Bosnia and Herzegovina
- Bijela, Konjic, a village in Bosnia and Herzegovina
- Bijela, Višegrad, a village in Bosnia and Herzegovina
- Bijela, Croatia, a village near Sirač, Croatia
- Bijela (Karin Sea), a river in Dalmatia, Croatia
- Bijela (Pakra), a river in Slavonia, Croatia
- Bijela (Plitvice Lakes), a tributary of the Plitvice Lakes, Croatia
- Bijela or Mostarska Bijela, a river in Herzegovina, tributary of the Neretva
- Bijela (Željeznica), a river near Trnovo, tributary of the Željeznica
- Bijela Rijeka (Lepenica), a river near Hadžići, tributary of the Lepenica
- Bijela (Bukovica), a river that flows into the Bukovica near Šavnik, Montenegro

== See also ==
- Bela (disambiguation)
- Bela Reka (disambiguation)
