= Icacos River =

River in Puerto Rico

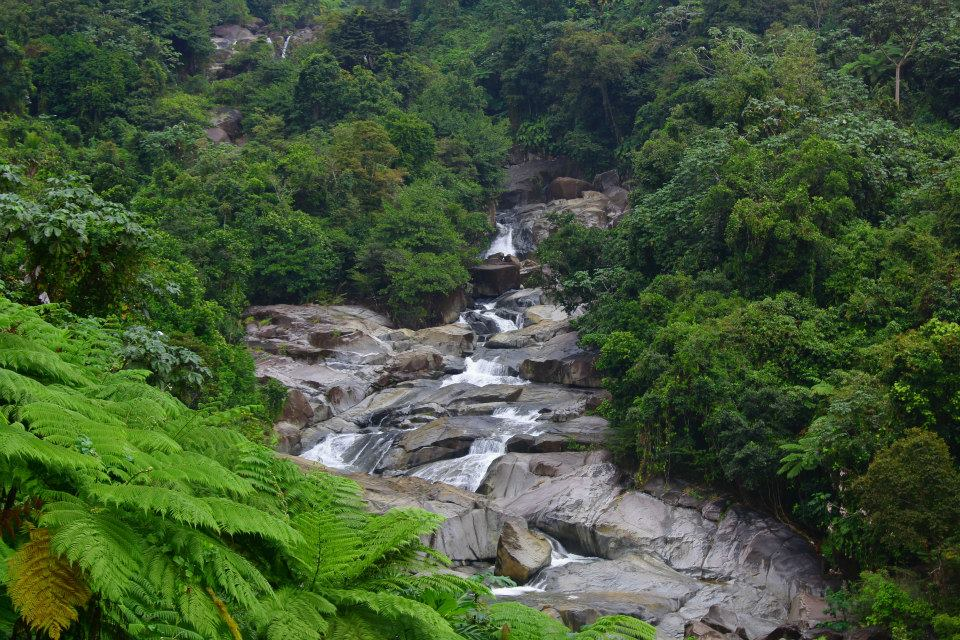
- Icacos Falls where the Prieto and Cubuy Rivers meet the Icacos River

- Location within Puerto Rico
- Etymology: Chrysobalanus icaco
- Native name: Río Icacos (Spanish); Río Hicacos (Spanish)

Location
- Commonwealth: Puerto Rico
- Municipality: Naguabo

Physical characteristics
- Source
  - elevation: 2158 ft.
- Mouth: Blanco River
  - location: Naguabo, Puerto Rico
  - coordinates: 18.2521781°N 65.7857184°W
- Length: 2.3 m (7 ft 7 in)

National Wild and Scenic River
- Type: Scenic
- Designated: December 19, 2002

The Icacos River (Spanish: Río Icacos), sometimes spelled Hicacos, is a river of Naguabo, Puerto Rico. It is 2.3 miles (3.7 km) long and has received the designation of "Wild and Scenic River" by the National Wild and Scenic Rivers System. This river aids the hydroelectric dam in Naguabo.

== Río Icacos National Wild and Scenic River ==
The Icacos River has been designated a National Wild and Scenic River since 2009. The river is located within El Yunque National Forest and El Toro Wilderness, and it has some of the most varied terrain of any of the forest rivers.

The Icacos River flows into a three-river junction (together with the Cubuy and Prieto Rivers) through a series of waterfalls often called the Icacos Falls or Cubuy Falls, also located within the municipality of Naguabo. This is the source of the Blanco River which flows southeast towards the Caribbean Sea in Río barrio, Naguabo.

== Gallery ==
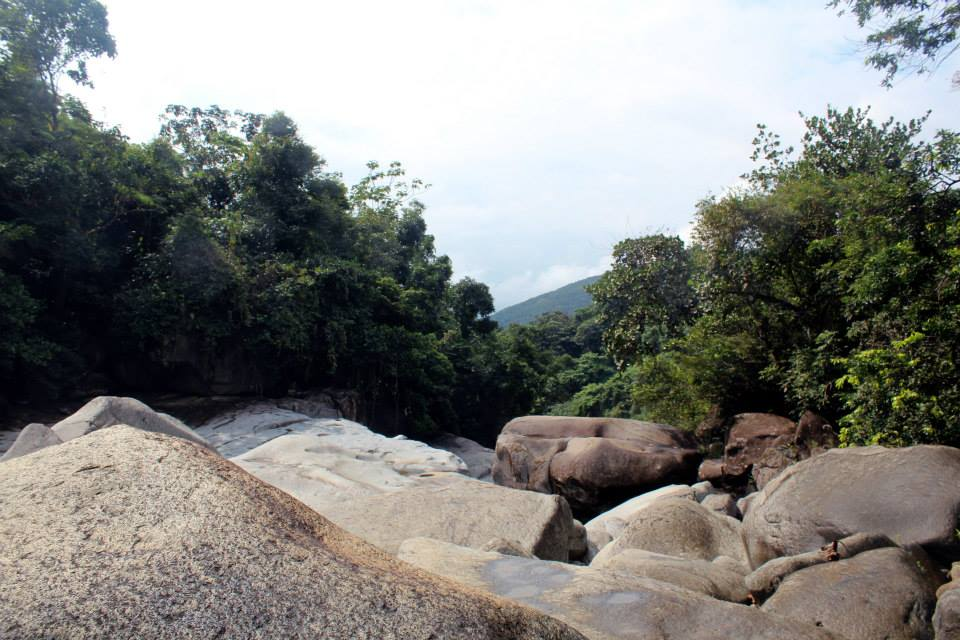
Boulders in Icacos River

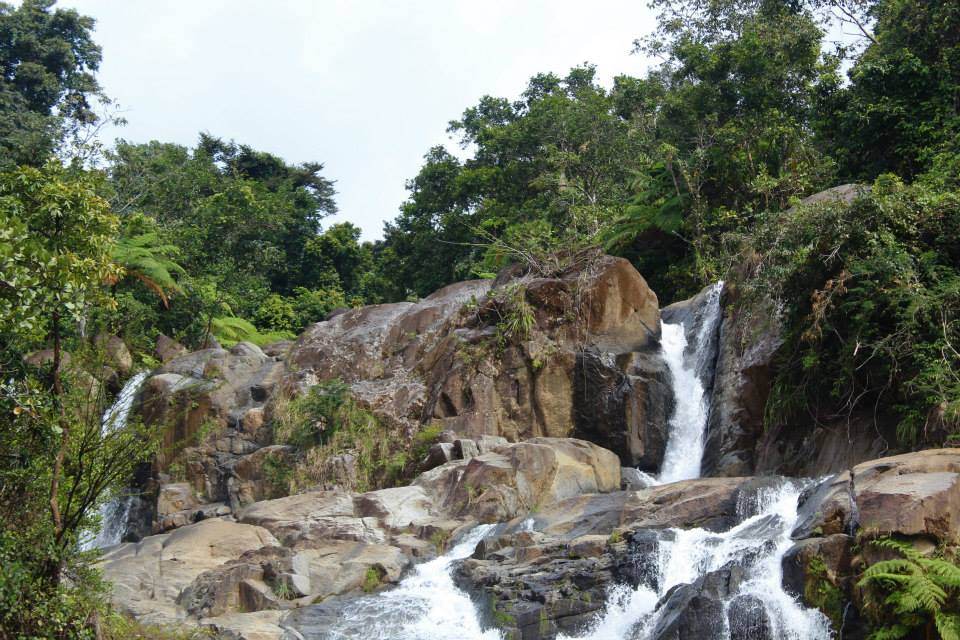
Waterfall in Icacos River

== See also ==
- List of rivers of Puerto Rico
- Cayo Icacos
