= Byala Reka =

Byala Reka (Bulgarian for "White River") may refer to:

- Byala Reka (Luda Reka tributary), a river in the Rhodope Mountains of Bulgaria
- Byala Reka, Plovdiv Province, a village in Bulgaria
- Byala Reka, Shumen Province, a village in north-eastern Bulgaria
- Byala Reka, Smolyan Province, a village in Rudozem Municipality, south-eastern Bulgaria
- Byala Reka, Veliko Tarnovo Province, a village in Suhindol Municipality, north-central Bulgaria

== See also ==
- White River (disambiguation)
- Bela Reka (disambiguation)
- Bijela Rijeka (disambiguation)
