= Rivière Blanche =

Rivière Blanche (French for "White River") or Blanche River may refer to:

== Rivers ==
=== Canada ===
- Blanche River (Ruban River tributary), Mauricie, Quebec, Canada
- Blanche River (Felton River tributary), Estrie, Quebec, Canada
- Blanche River (rivière au Pin tributary), Chaudière-Appalaches, Quebec, Canada
- Blanche River (Thetford Mines), a tributary of the Bécancour River in Chaudière-Appalaches, Quebec, Canada
- Blanche River (Bourbon River tributary), Centre-du-Québec, Quebec, Canada
- Blanche River (Saint-Casimir), in MRC Portneuf, Capitale-Nationale, Quebec, Canada
- Blanche River (Bécancour River tributary, Daveluyville), Centre-du-Québec, Quebec, Canada
- Blanche River (rivière à Pierre), Lac-Blanc, Capitale-Nationale, Quebec, Canada
- Blanche River (rivière des Mères), Bellechasse, Chaudière-Appalaches, Quebec, Canada
- Blanche River (Montmorency River tributary), La Côte-de-Beaupré, Capitale-Nationale, Quebec, Canada
- Blanche River (Etchemin River tributary), Bellechasse and Les Etchemins, Chaudière-Appalaches, Quebec, Canada
- Blanche River (Nicolet River tributary), Arthabaska, Centre-du-Québec, Quebec, Canada
- Blanche River (Bulstrode River tributary), Arthabaska, Centre-du-Québec, Quebec, Canada
- Blanche River (Portneuf River tributary), Sainte-Catherine-de-la-Jacques-Cartier, Quebec, Canada
- Blanche River (Lake Timiskaming), Timiskaming District, Ontario, Canada

=== France ===
- Blanche (Loire-Atlantique)

=== Haiti ===
- Rivière Blanche (Artibonite)
- Rivière Blanche (Ouest)

=== Martinique ===
- Rivière Blanche (Martinique)

== Other places ==
- La Rivière Blanche, a portage on the Winnipeg River
- Rivière-Blanche, former name of Saint-Ulric, Quebec, Canada
- Rivière-Blanche District, a municipal district in Gatineau, Quebec, Canada
- Zec de la Rivière-Blanche, Quebec, Canada

== Other uses ==
- Rivière Blanche/Cardinal Aviation Water Aerodrome, an aerodrome north of Gatineau, Quebec, Canada
- Rivière Blanche (publisher), a small press publishing French science fiction novels, started by Jean-Marc Lofficier in 2005
- La Rivière Blanche, a musical composition for viola by Pascal Proust

== See also ==
- Blanche (disambiguation)
- White River (disambiguation)
- Río Blanco (disambiguation)
