= Marengo (CDP), Wisconsin =

Census-designated place in Wisconsin, United States

Marengo, Wisconsin
- Census-designated place
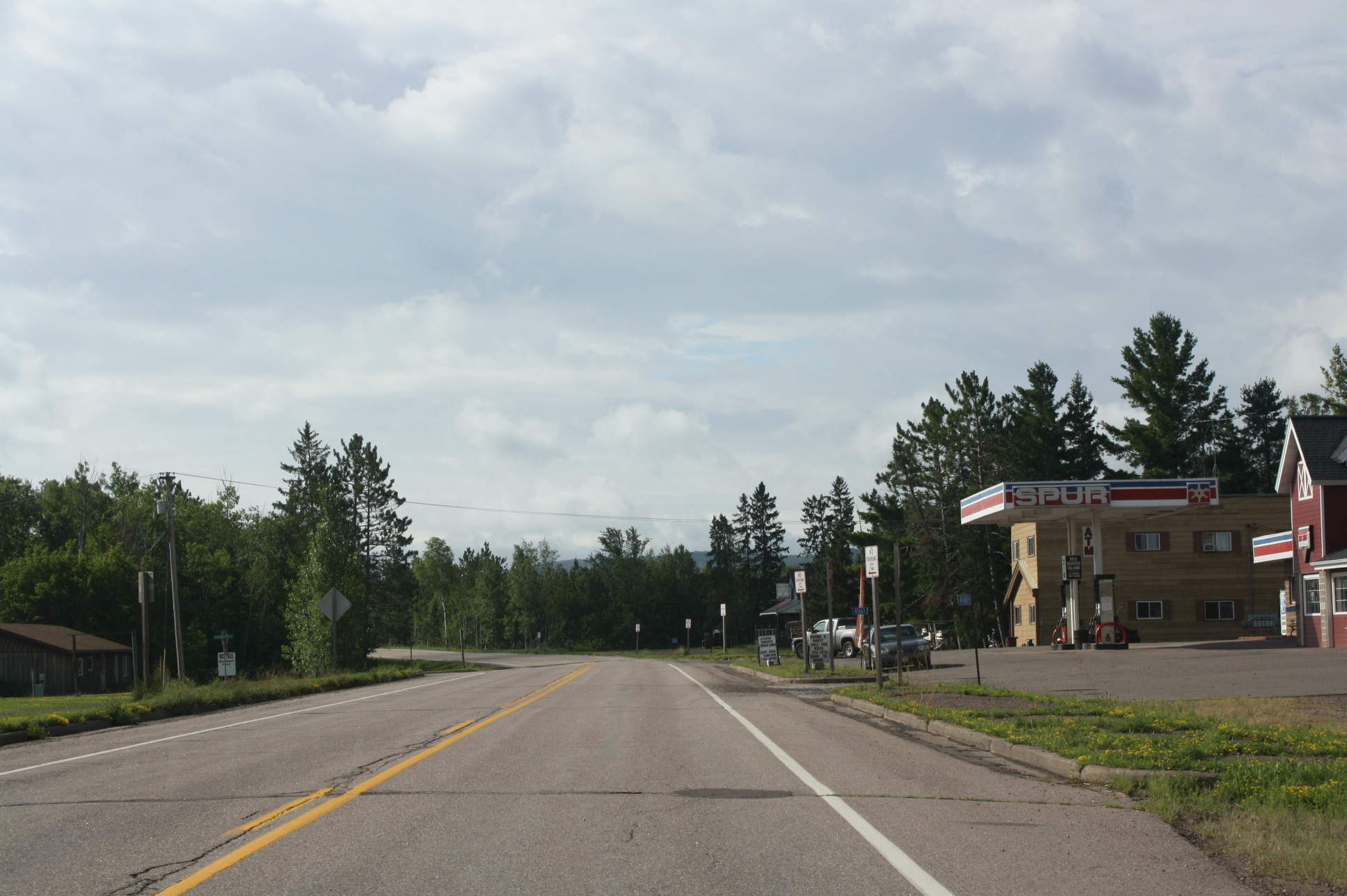
- Looking south at Marengo on WIS13

- Location within Wisconsin
- Coordinates: 46°25′21″N 90°49′01″W
- Country: United States
- State: Wisconsin
- County: Ashland
- Town: White River

Area
  - Total: 1.024 sq mi (2.65 km^{2})
  - Land: 1.024 sq mi (2.65 km^{2})
  - Water: 0 sq mi (0 km^{2})
- Elevation: 761 ft (232 m)

Population (2020)
  - Total: 148
  - Density: 145/sq mi (55.8/km^{2})
- Time zone: UTC-6 (Central (CST))
  - Summer (DST): UTC-5 (CDT)
- ZIP code: 54855
- Area codes: 715 & 534
- GNIS feature ID: 1569024

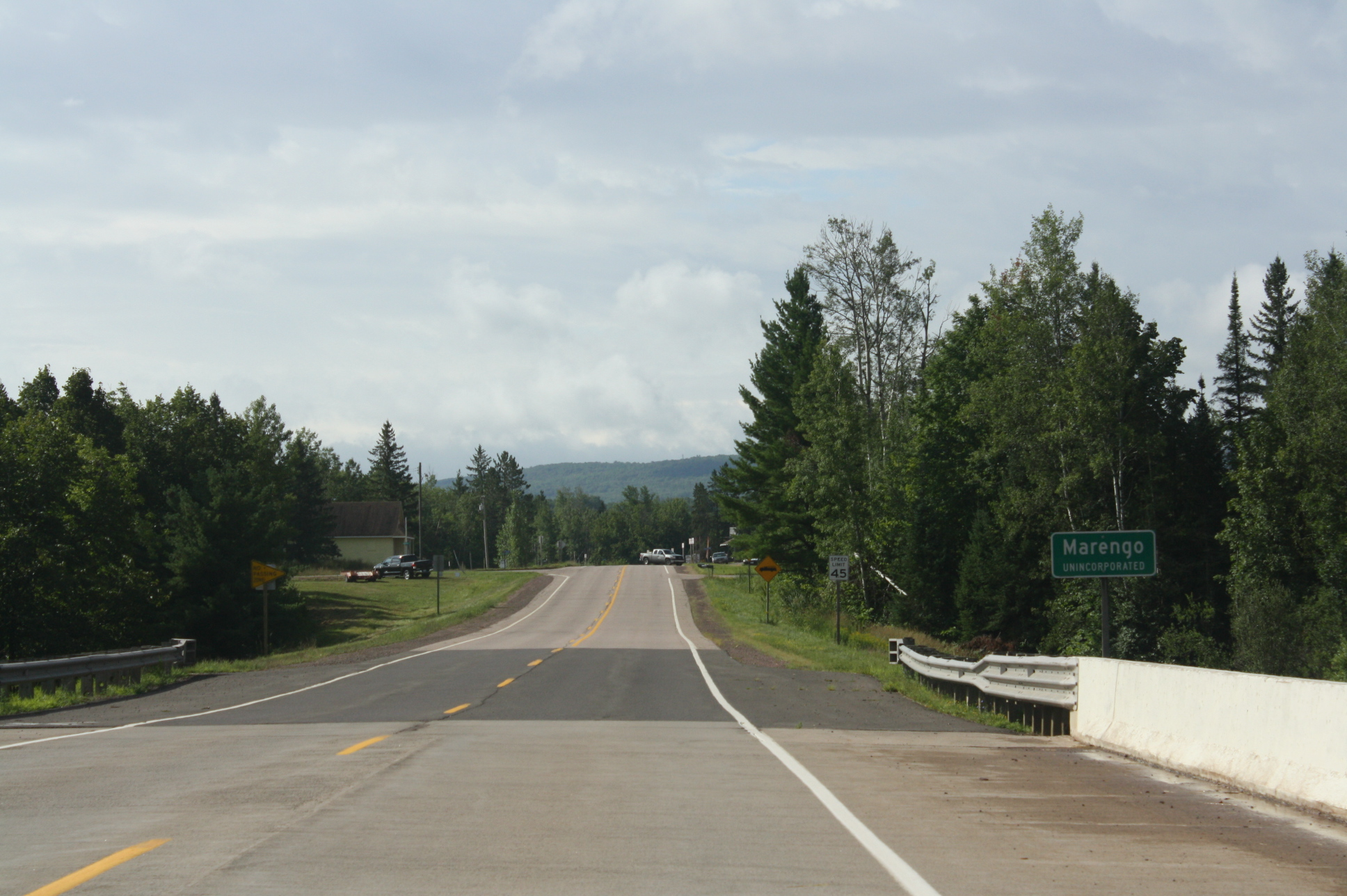
Sign on WIS13

Marengo is an unincorporated census-designated place located in the town of White River, Ashland County, Wisconsin, United States. Marengo is located on Wisconsin Highway 13, 10 miles (16 km) northwest of Mellen. Marengo had a post office, which closed on June 27, 2009. At the 2020 census, its population was 148, up from 111 at the 2010 census. Bus service to the community is provided by Bay Area Rural Transit.
