= Bijela, Višegrad =

Bijela
- Village
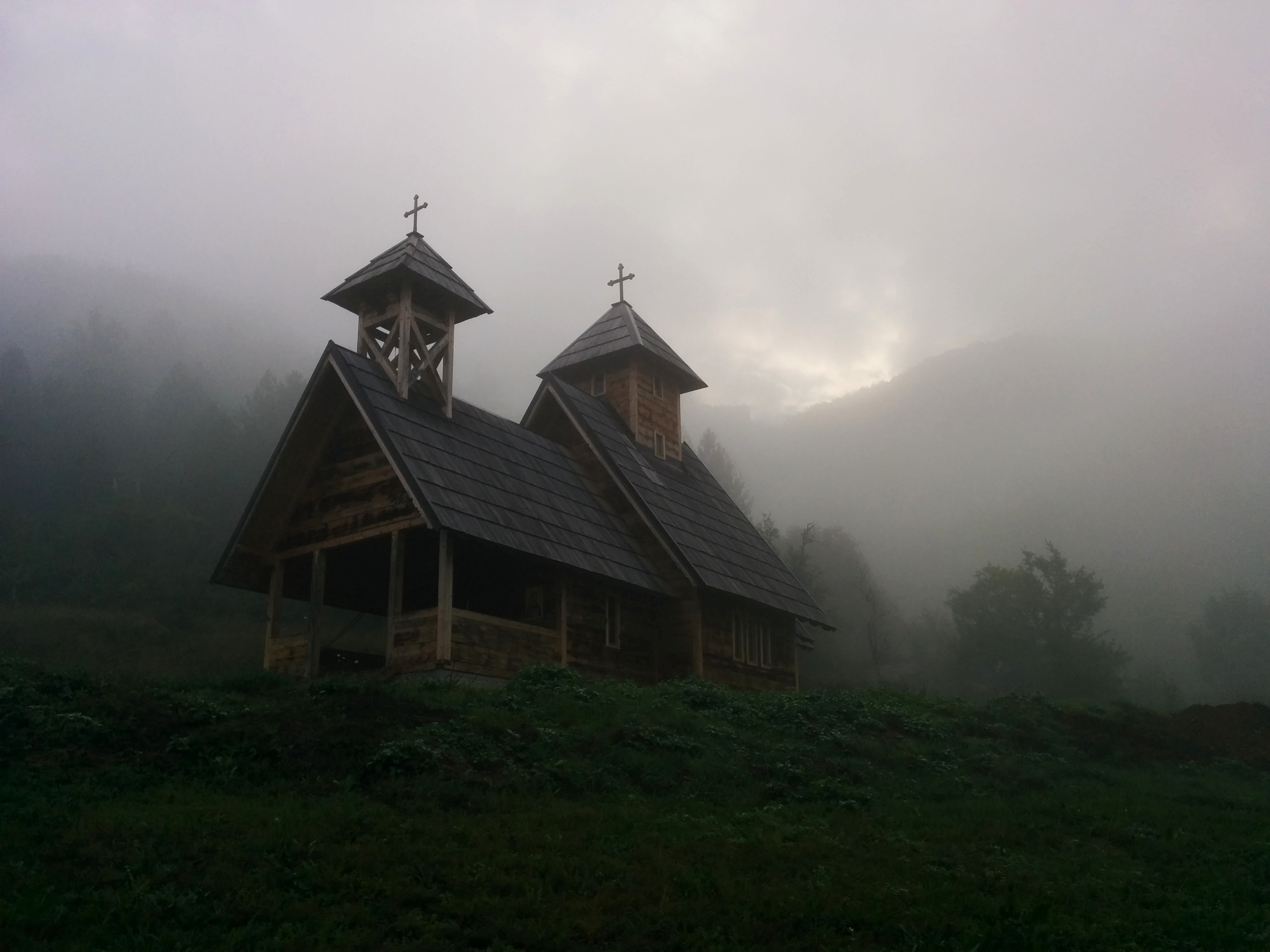
- Church in Bijela

- Location within Bosnia and Herzegovina
- Coordinates: 43°46′50″N 19°23′26″E
- Country: Bosnia and Herzegovina
- Entity: Republika Srpska
- Municipality: Višegrad
- Time zone: UTC+1 (CET)
  - Summer (DST): UTC+2 (CEST)

Bijela (Serbian: Бијела) is a village in the municipality of Višegrad, Bosnia and Herzegovina.
