= Bijela, Konjic =

Bijela Бијела
- Village
- Location within Bosnia and Herzegovina
- Coordinates: 43°36′31″N 17°57′07″E
- Country: Bosnia and Herzegovina
- Entity: Federation of Bosnia and Herzegovina
- Canton: Herzegovina-Neretva
- Municipality: Konjic

Area
  - Total: 9.54 sq mi (24.72 km^{2})

Population (2013)
  - Total: 186
  - Density: 19.5/sq mi (7.52/km^{2})
- Time zone: UTC+1 (CET)
  - Summer (DST): UTC+2 (CEST)

Bijela (Cyrillic: Бијела) is a village in the municipality of Konjic, Bosnia and Herzegovina.

== Name ==
The name of this small hamlet means "white" in the native language

== Demographics ==
According to the 2013 census, its population was 186.

Ethnicity in 2013
Ethnicity	Number	Percentage
Bosniaks	160	86.0%
Croats	21	11.3%
Serbs	2	1.1%
other/undeclared	3	1.6%
Total	186	100%
