= Belaya River =

Belaya River (meaning 'White River' in Russian) may refer to the following rivers in Russia:

- Belaya (Lake Imandra), a tributary of the Lake Imandra in the Murmansk Oblast
- Belaya (Kama), a tributary of the Kama in the Republic of Bashkortostan
- Belaya (Kuban), a tributary of the Kuban in the Republic of Adygea and in Krasnodar Krai
- Belaya (Penzhina), a tributary of the Penzhina River in Kamchatka Krai
- Belaya (Angara), a tributary of the Angara in Irkutsk Oblast
- Belaya (Chukotka), a tributary of the Anadyr in the Chukotka Autonomous Okrug
- Belaya (Yakutia), another name for the Khanda, a tributary of the Aldan

== See also ==
- White River (disambiguation)
