= Mitchinamecus Reservoir =

Reservoir in Laurentides, Quebec, Canada

Coordinates: 47°21′00″N 75°04′06″W

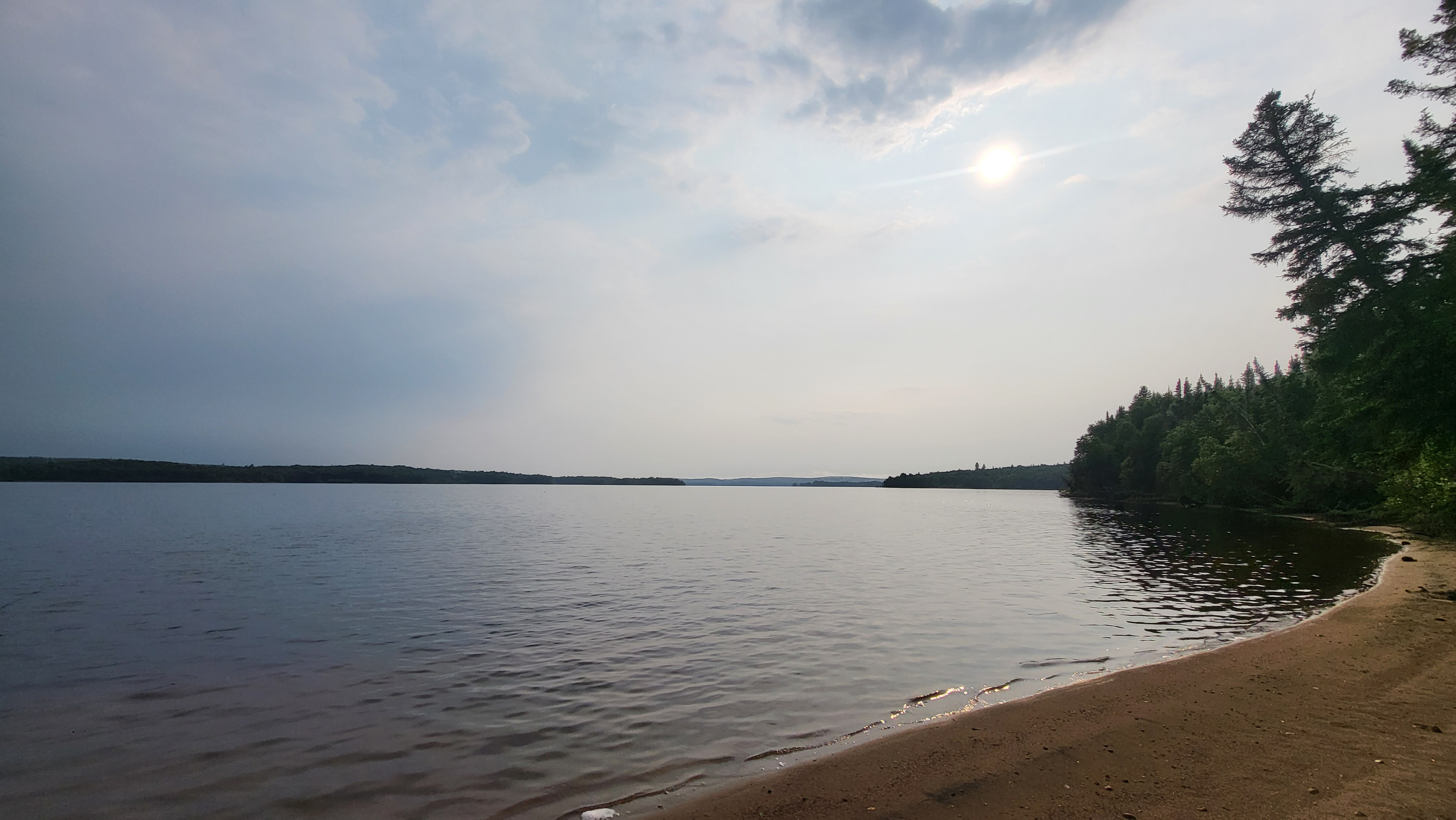
Mitchinamecus Reservoir, 2025.

Mitchinamecus Reservoir is a reservoir in Lac-Oscar unorganized territory, Antoine-Labelle Regional County Municipality, Laurentides region, Quebec, Canada.

It is formed by the Mitchi-Réal dam, constructed in 1942, across the Mitchinamecus River.

The surrounding area is home to moose and is frequented by moose hunters.
