= Blanco River (Naguabo, Puerto Rico) =

River of Puerto Rico

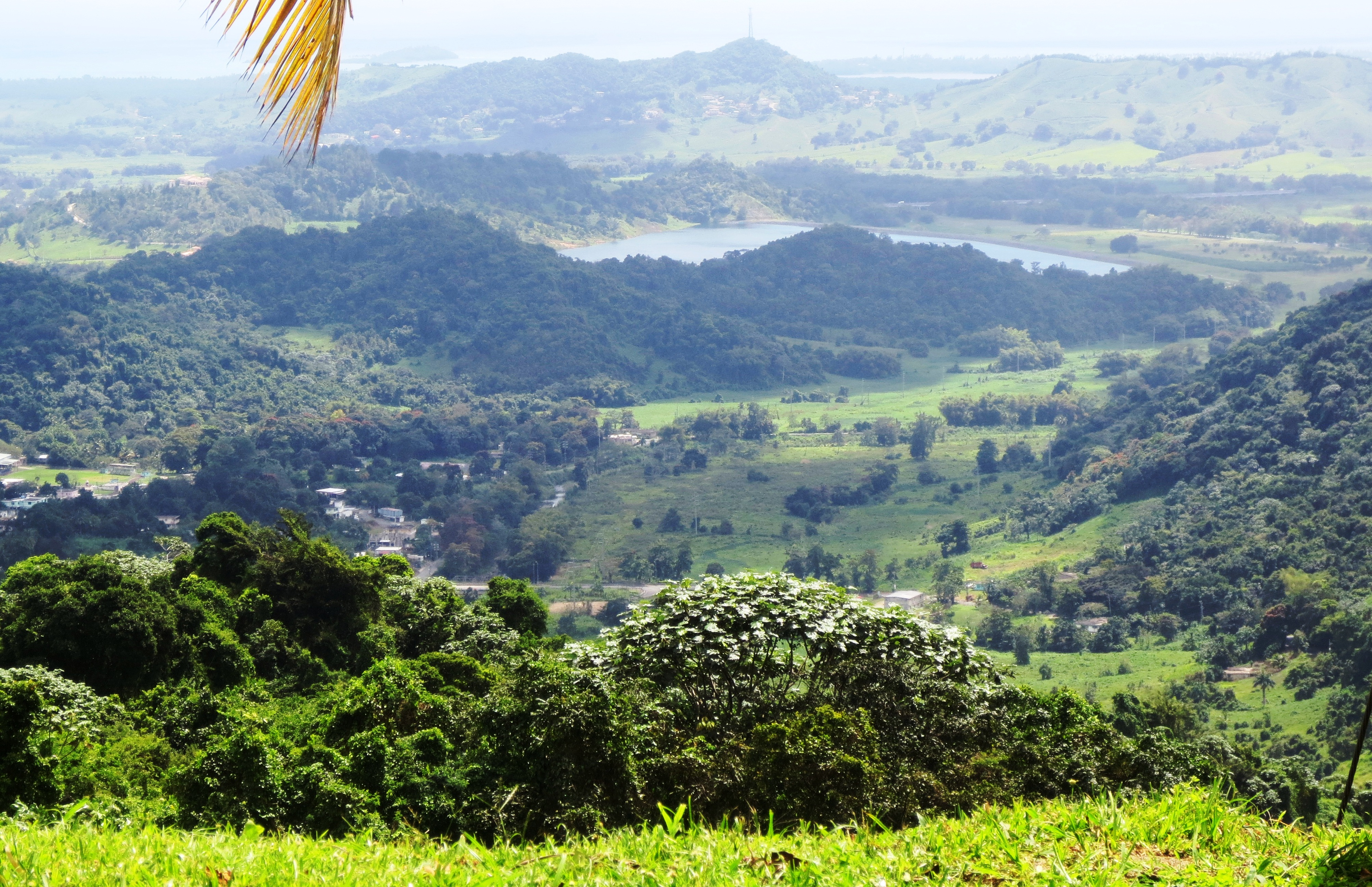
- Río Blanco valley in Naguabo

- Location of mouth
- Native name: Río Blanco (Spanish)

Location
- Commonwealth: Puerto Rico
- Municipality: Naguabo

Physical characteristics
- Source
  - location: Icacos Falls in Río Blanco, Naguabo
  - coordinates: 18.1852372°N 65.7287727°W
  - elevation: 558 ft.
- Mouth
  - location: Naguabo Bay in Río, Naguabo
  - elevation: 0 ft.
- Length: 8.5 m (28 ft)

The Blanco River (Spanish: Río Blanco) is a river of Naguabo, Puerto Rico. This river begins at the waterfalls of the junction of the Cubuy River, the Icacos River and the Prieto River in El Yunque National Forest at an approximate elevation of 558 feet (170 meters) above sea level. It is approximately 8.5 miles (13.7 kilometers) in length, from its origin until its discharge into the east coast of Puerto Rico in Río barrio in the municipality of Naguabo. It runs from north to southeast.

== Recreation ==
The upper portions of the Blanco River is famous for its waterfalls and plunge pools (charcos) such as El Hippie, a popular swimming site formed by La Canoa Falls. The entire river basin is also famous for its numerous indigenous petroglyph sites, such as the ones found in El Hippie and the Río Blanco Petroglyphs, found higher upstream within the protected territory of El Yunque National Forest.

== See also ==
- List of rivers of Puerto Rico
