= Bela Reka (Šabac) =

Village in Šabac municipality, Serbia

Coordinates: 44°38′56″N 19°29′19″E

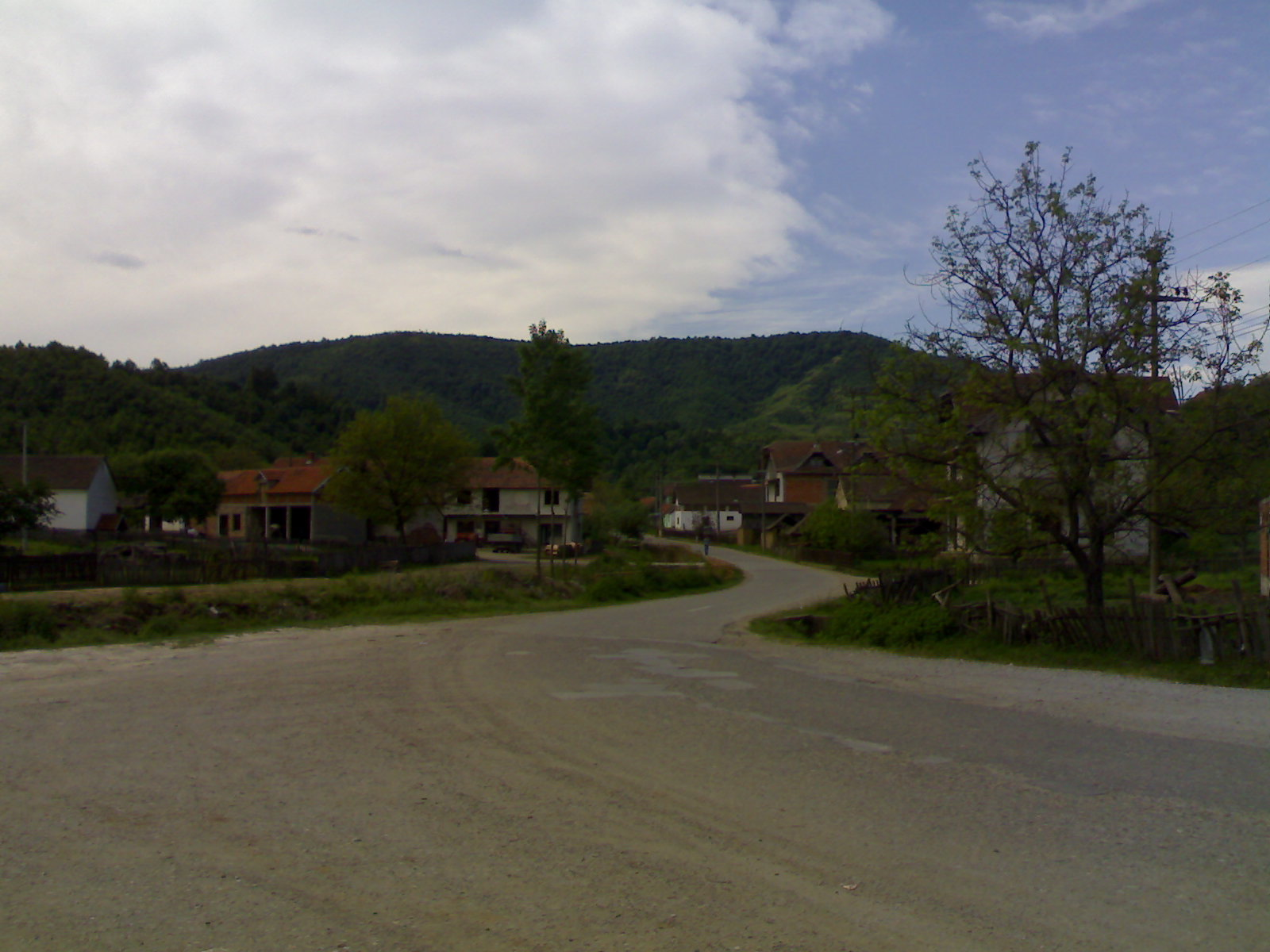
Bela Reka

Bela Reka is a village in Šabac, Serbia.

Archeological findings dating to 1st and 2nd century AD Roman Serbia of a villa rustica, high quality golden and silver jewelry and other vessels and 322 coins.
