= Termen-Yelga (river) =

River in Bashkiria, Russia

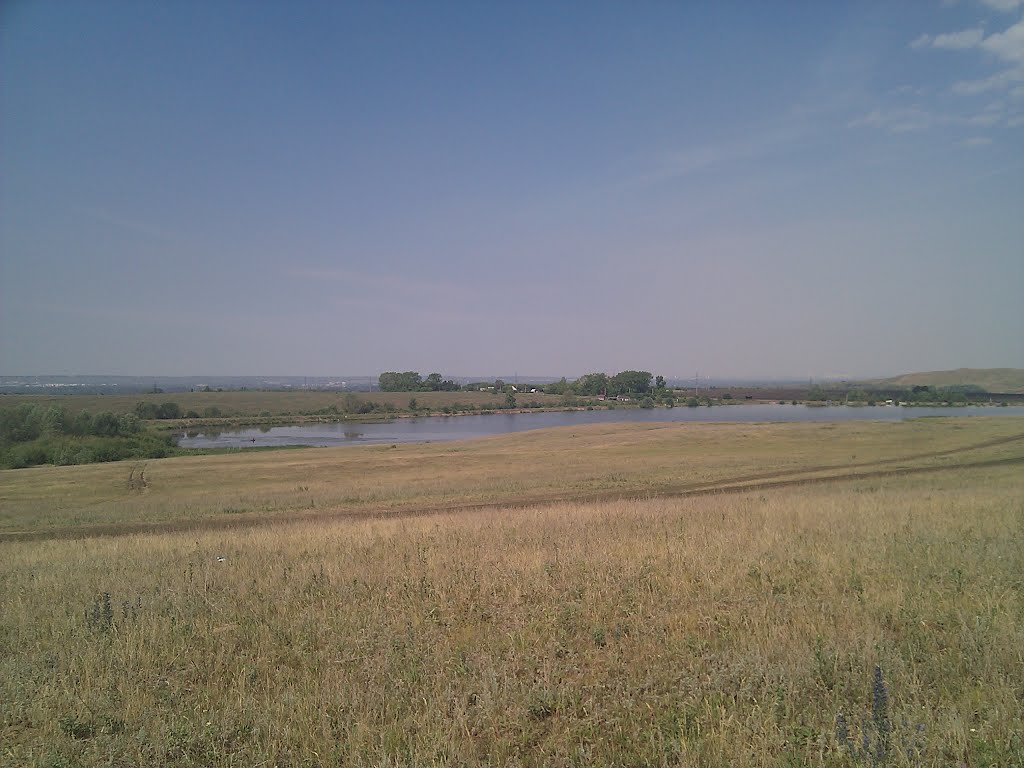
River Termen-Yelga

Termen-Yelga (Russian: Термень-Елга Termenʼ-Elga, also Терменьелга and Терменъелга; Bashkir: Тирмәнйылға, Tirmänyılğa, lit. "mill river") is river in Bashkortostan, Russia. It is a tributary of the Belaya that flows through the town of Ishimbay.

The Termen-Yelginskoye oil field was developed in the middle of the 20th century. Later, dams creating small reservoir ponds were built to supply industry in the city of Ishimbay. One pond for Ishimbayneft has a volume 520 m^{3} and a surface area of 0.17 km^{2}. A second pond, Tyurinsk Pond, was built for the Chaika (Чайка) sanatorium.
