= Lac-Oscar =

- Unorganized territory
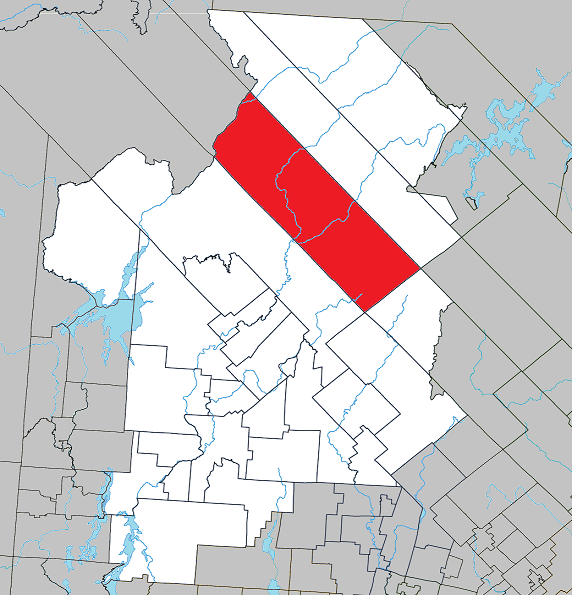
- Location within Antoine-Labelle RCM.

- Location in central Quebec.
- Coordinates: 47°17′N 75°12′W
- Country: Canada
- Province: Quebec
- Region: Laurentides
- RCM: Antoine-Labelle
- Constituted: January 1, 1986

Government
  - Federal riding: Laurentides—Labelle
  - Prov. riding: Labelle

Area
  - Total: 1,810.90 km^{2} (699.19 sq mi)
  - Land: 1,667.85 km^{2} (643.96 sq mi)

Population (2021)
  - Total: 0
  - Density: 0/km^{2} (0/sq mi)
  - Pop 2016-2021: N/A
  - Dwellings: 0
- Time zone: UTC−5 (EST)
  - Summer (DST): UTC−4 (EDT)
- Highways: No major routes

Lac-Oscar (French pronunciation: [lak ɔskaʁ]) is an unorganized territory in the Laurentides region of Quebec, Canada, and one of eleven unorganized areas in the Antoine-Labelle Regional County Municipality. No permanent population resides in this territory.

== See also ==
- List of unorganized territories in Quebec
