= White River, Wisconsin =

- Town
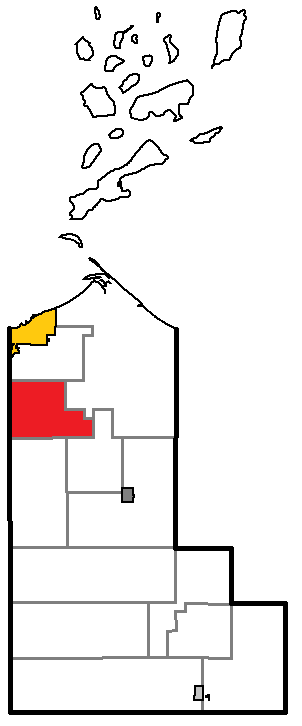
- Location of White River, within Ashland County, Wisconsin
- Coordinates: 46°26′16″N 90°49′53″W
- Country: United States
- State: Wisconsin
- County: Ashland

Area
  - Total: 44.1 sq mi (114.3 km^{2})
  - Land: 44.1 sq mi (114.1 km^{2})
  - Water: 0.077 sq mi (0.2 km^{2})
- Elevation: 784 ft (239 m)

Population (2020)
  - Total: 1,067
  - Density: 24.22/sq mi (9.351/km^{2})
- Time zone: UTC-6 (Central (CST))
  - Summer (DST): UTC-5 (CDT)
- Area codes: 715 & 534
- FIPS code: 55-86850
- GNIS feature ID: 1584430
- Website: https://www.townofwhiteriver.org/

White River is a town in Ashland County, Wisconsin, United States. The population was 1,067 at the 2020 census. The census-designated place of Marengo and unincorporated communities of Sanborn and part of Jolmaville are located in the town.

== Geography ==
According to the United States Census Bureau, the town has a total area of 44.1 square miles (114.3 km^{2}), of which 44.1 square miles (114.1 km^{2}) is land and 0.077 square miles (0.2 km^{2}), or 0.15%, is water.

== Demographics ==
Historical population
Census	Pop.	Note	%±
1910	519		—
1920	690		32.9%
1930	729		5.7%
1940	676		−7.3%
1950	672		−0.6%
1960	593		−11.8%
1970	606		2.2%
1980	685		13.0%
1990	771		12.6%
2000	892		15.7%
2010	921		3.3%
2020	1,067		15.9%
U.S. Decennial Census

As of the census of 2000, there were 892 people, 281 households, and 207 families residing in the town. The population density was 20.3 people per square mile (7.8/km^{2}). There were 312 housing units at an average density of 7.1 per square mile (2.7/km^{2}). The racial makeup of the town was 96.97% White, 1.91% Native American, 0.22% Asian, 0.34% from other races, and 0.56% from two or more races. Hispanic or Latino of any race were 0.56% of the population.

There were 281 households, out of which 39.5% had children under the age of 18 living with them, 64.1% were married couples living together, 5.7% had a female householder with no husband present, and 26.3% were non-families. 21.4% of all households were made up of individuals, and 9.3% had someone living alone who was 65 years of age or older. The average household size was 3.17 and the average family size was 3.84.

In the town, the population was spread out, with 40.2% under the age of 18, 8.0% from 18 to 24, 26.2% from 25 to 44, 16.7% from 45 to 64, and 8.9% who were 65 years of age or older. The median age was 27 years. For every 100 females, there were 100.4 males. For every 100 females age 18 and over, there were 98.9 males.

The median income for a household in the town was $38,250, and the median income for a family was $41,765. Males had a median income of $30,875 versus $19,688 for females. The per capita income for the town was $15,667. About 3.4% of families and 5.6% of the population were below the poverty line, including 6.3% of those under age 18 and 3.3% of those age 65 or over.
