= Donja Bela Reka (Bor) =

Donja Bela Reka Доња Бела Река
- Village
- Location within Serbia
- Coordinates: 44°04′09″N 22°12′03″E
- Country: Serbia
- District: Bor District
- Municipality: Bor

Population (2022)
  - Total: 633
- Time zone: UTC+1 (CET)
  - Summer (DST): UTC+2 (CEST)

Donja Bela Reka (Serbian Cyrillic: Доња Бела Река) is a village in the municipality of Bor, Serbia. According to the 2022 census, the village has a population of 633 people.
