= Donja Bela Reka (Nova Varoš) =

Donja Bela Reka Доња Бела Река
- Village
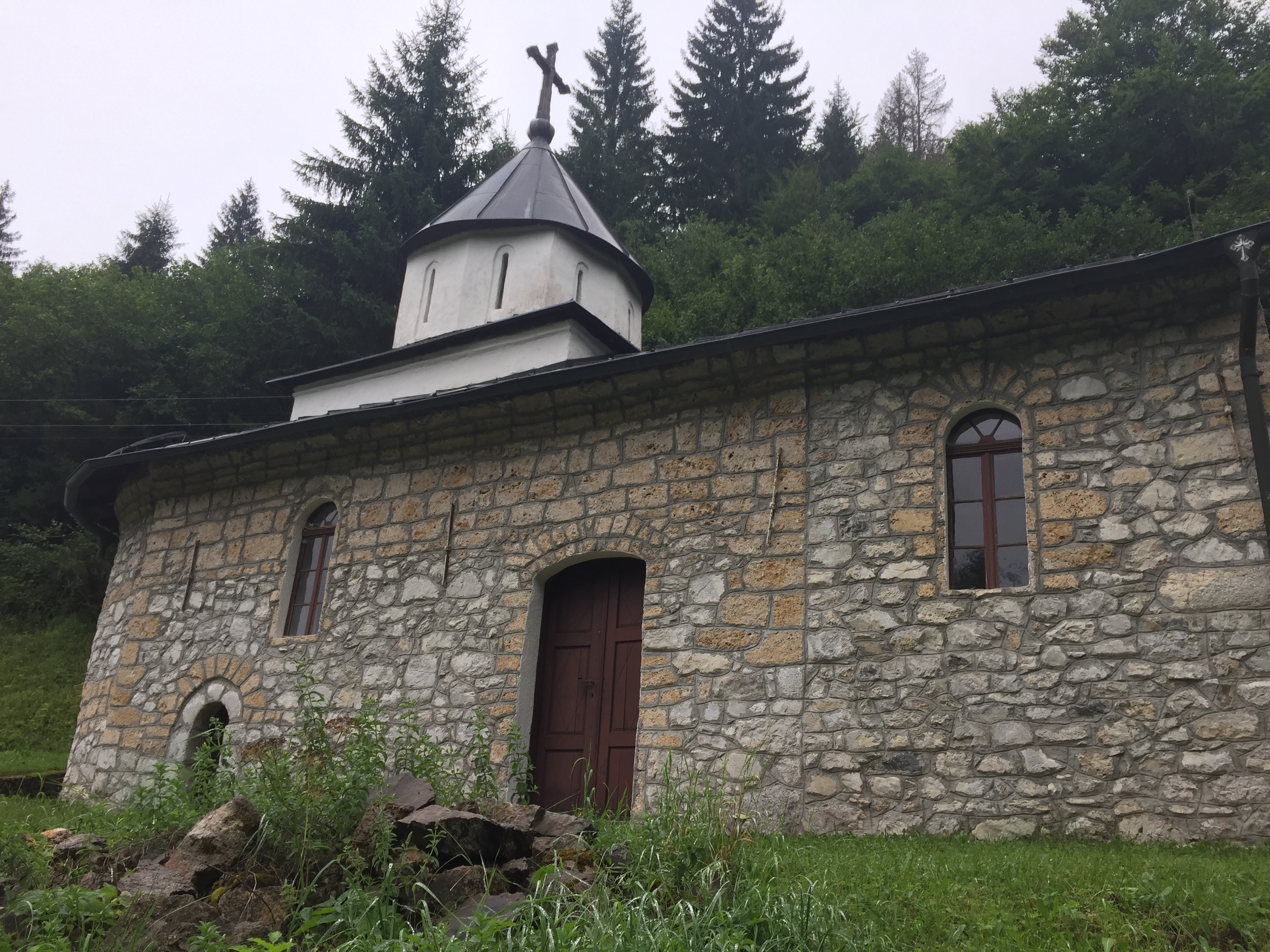
- Orthodox Church in Donja Bela Reka

- Location within Serbia
- Coordinates: 43°34′N 19°53′E
- Country: Serbia
- District: Zlatibor District
- Municipality: Nova Varoš

Population (2002)
  - Total: 287
- Time zone: UTC+1 (CET)
  - Summer (DST): UTC+2 (CEST)

Donja Bela Reka (Serbian Cyrillic: Доња Бела Река) is a village in the municipality of Nova Varoš, western Serbia. According to the 2002 census, the village has a population of 287 people.
