= Kempt Lake =

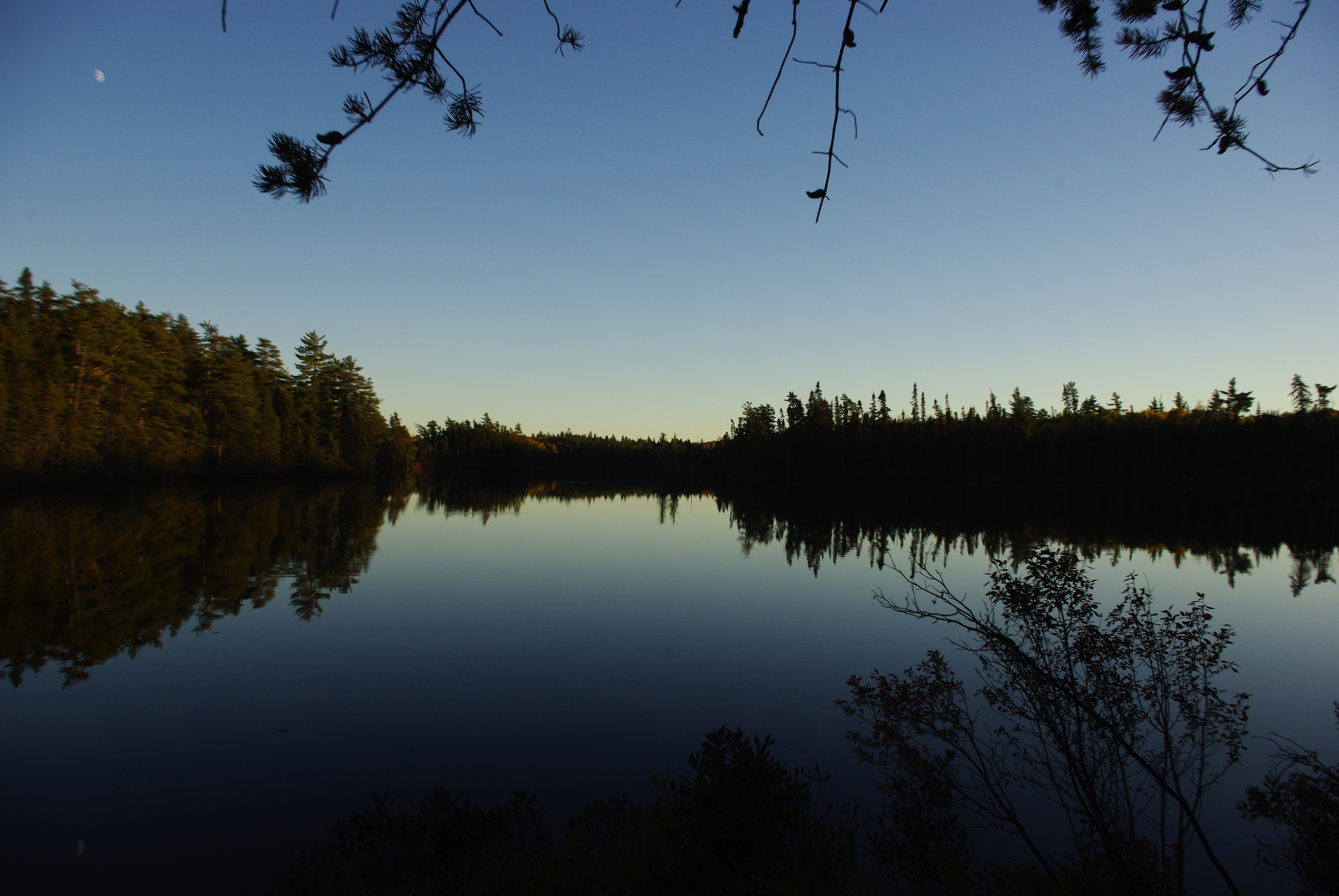
- Kempt Lake from the Manawan Indian Reserve

- Location within Quebec
- Location: Baie-Obaoca / Baie-Atibienne, Matawinie Regional County Municipality, Quebec
- Coordinates: 47°26′17″N 74°16′45″W
- Type: reservoir contained by a dam
- Primary inflows: Manouane River
- Primary outflows: Manouane River
- Basin countries: Canada
- Surface area: 12,000 ha (30,000 acres)
- Islands: "Aux érables Island" (Maple Island), cedar island and Arikici island
- Settlements: Obaoca Bay

The Kempt Lake is located in the unorganized territory of Lac-Matawin, Quebec in the MRC Matawinie, in the administrative region of Lanaudière, in Quebec, in Canada. This reservoir is located on the route of the Manouane River (La Tuque) in northern Rouge-Matawin Wildlife Reserve.

== Geography ==
Located southeast of Lake Manouane, Kempt Lake is deformed and has many peninsulas and bays. It includes dozens of islands, the most important are the islands "Aux érables" (maple), cedar island and Arikici island.

Dike of Bay Gavin

Kemp reservoir is contained by the dike Bay Gavin, located in the unincorporated territory of Obaoca Bay, in the MRC Matawinie. This dam was originally built in 1908 and is the property of Hydro-Québec. The dam has a height of 4 m and a holding capacity of 40.7 million m³. The length of the dam is 73 m. The type of dam is made of earth on a foundation of till. The coordinates of the dam are : latitude 47⁰ 32' 11" and longitude -74⁰ 11' 2". The area of the reservoir is 12,000 ha. The utility of this dam is for hydro-electric purpose.

Dam Manouane-A

A second dam of a strong capacity on Kempt Lake designated Manouane-A, was built in 1941 for the end of hydroelectricity. The dam has a height of 7 m and a length of 108.8 m. The height of the reservoir is 4.8 m. with an impounding capacity of 407 million m³. The area of the reservoir is 12,000 ha. The catchment area is 1,507 km².

Strait between lakes

A 6.1 km long strait separates lakes Manouane and Kempt. The distance by road is 173 km from the center of the town of Saint-Michel-des-Saints and Kempt Lake. The road skirts Kempt lake by the East.

== Toponymy ==
The name "Lake Kempt" was recorded on December 5, 1968, at the Bank of place names in Commission de toponymie du Québec (Geographical Names Board of Québec).

== See also ==
- Manouane River (La Tuque)
- Saint-Maurice River
- La Tuque (urban agglomeration)
- Lake Manouane
- Mauricie
- Lanaudière
- Manawan, Quebec, Canadian Indian reserve
