= Jacques-Félix Sincennes =

Jacques-Félix Sincennes (January 7, 1818 – February 20, 1876) was a Quebec businessman and political figure.

He was born Jacques-Félix Saincennes in Deschambault, Lower Canada in 1818, of Acadian descent. The original spelling of the family name was Saint-Seine. He apprenticed with his father as a pilot on the Saint Lawrence River. In 1839, he was hired as a purser on a steamer on the river. He established a steamship service on the Richelieu River, with himself as captain, in 1845. This company amalgamated with a competing service to form La Compagnie du Richelieu; Sincennes later served as secretary-treasurer and president for the company. The company expanded to provide service between Montreal and Quebec City and absorbed a number of its competitors. In 1875, it amalgamated with the Canadian Navigation Company to form the Richelieu and Ontario Navigation Company, later Canada Steamship Lines, operating on the Saint Lawrence and the Great Lakes. In 1849, Sincennes, with William McNaughton, formed the Sincennes-McNaughton Line, which towed and berthed ships on the Ottawa, Richelieu and Saint Lawrence rivers. In 1857, he was elected to the Legislative Assembly of the Province of Canada for Richelieu. In 1873, he helped found the Royal Canadian Insurance Company of Montreal. Sincennes also served as vice-president of La Banque du Peuple.

He died in Montreal in 1876.
