= Gornja Bela Reka, Zaječar =

Gornja Bela Reka Горња Бела Река
- Village
- Location within Serbia
- Coordinates: 43°46′49″N 22°12′37″E
- Country: Serbia
- District: Zaječar District
- Municipality: Zaječar

Population (2002)
  - Total: 185
- Time zone: UTC+1 (CET)
  - Summer (DST): UTC+2 (CEST)

Gornja Bela Reka is a village in the municipality of Zaječar, Serbia. According to the 2002 census, the village has a population of 185 people.
