= Yurmaty =

Yurmaty Юрматы
- Selo
- Location within Bashkortostan Location within Russia
- Coordinates: 52°59′N 55°34′E
- Country: Russia
- Region: Bashkortostan
- District: Fyodorovsky District
- Time zone: UTC+5:00

Yurmaty (Russian: Юрматы; Bashkir: Юрматы, Yurmatı) is a rural locality (a selo) and the administrative centre of Pugachevsky Selsoviet, Fyodorovsky District, Bashkortostan, Russia. The population was 749 as of 2010. There are 7 streets.

== Geography ==
Yurmaty is located 49 km southeast of Fyodorovka (the district's administrative centre) by road. Bogorodskoye is the nearest rural locality.
