= Baie-Obaoca =

- Unorganized territory
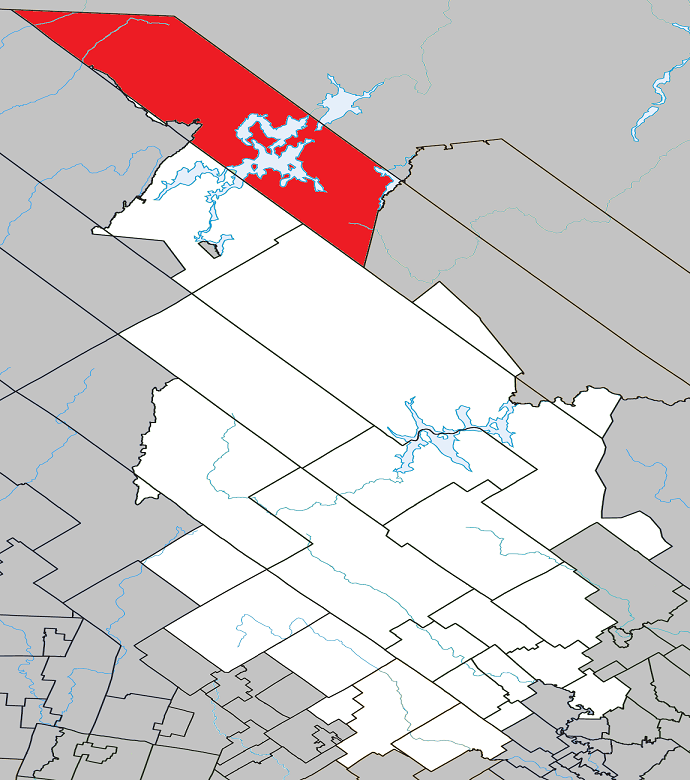
- Location within Matawinie RCM

- Location in central Quebec
- Coordinates: 47°31′N 74°18′W
- Country: Canada
- Province: Quebec
- Region: Lanaudière
- RCM: Matawinie
- Constituted: March 13, 1986

Government
  - Fed. riding: Saint-Maurice—Champlain
  - Prov. riding: Berthier

Area
  - Total: 1,479.61 km^{2} (571.28 sq mi)
  - Land: 1,261.66 km^{2} (487.13 sq mi)

Population (2021)
  - Total: 0
  - Density: 0/km^{2} (0/sq mi)
  - Change 2016-21: 0.0%
  - Dwellings: 0
- Time zone: UTC−5 (EST)
  - Summer (DST): UTC−4 (EDT)
- Highways: No major routes

Bay Obaoca is an unorganized territory forming part of the Matawinie Regional County Municipality which is part of the administrative region of Lanaudière, in Quebec, in Canada.

== Toponymy ==
His name was formalized on March 13, 1986 in the Bank of place names of Commission de toponymie du Québec (Geographical Names Board of Québec). It takes its name from the Obaoca Bay, located north-west end of Kempt Lake.

== Geography ==
This unorganized territory covers an area of 1,261.66 square kilometres (487.13 sq mi).

== Demographics ==
Historical census populations – Baie-Obaoca
Year	Pop.	±%
1996	0	—
2001	0	0.00%
2006	0	0.00%
2011	0	0.00%
2016	0	0.00%
2021	0	0.00%
Source: Statistics Canada

== See also ==
- List of unorganized territories in Quebec
