= Lake Manouane (La Tuque) =

Lake in La Tuque, Quebec, Canada

- Location within Quebec
- Location: La Tuque / Baie-Obaoca, Quebec
- Coordinates: 47°33′54″N 74°06′49″W
- Primary outflows: Manouane River
- Basin countries: Canada

Lake Manouane (Lac Manouane) is a lake in central Quebec, Canada. It is just north-east of Kempt Lake, mostly within the boundaries of the City of La Tuque. (Its extreme southern tip lies in Baie-Obaoca, in Matawinie Regional County Municipality.) It should not be confused with more northerly Lake Manouane in the Peribonka River watershed.

== Geography ==
The main roads to reach the lake Manouane pass through Saint-Micihel-des-Saints (Lanaudière) or Rivière-aux-Rats (Mauricie).

The Lac Kempt, located southwest of Lake Manouane is the main tributary of the latter. A strait of about 1.9 km (1.2 mi) connects the Lac Kempt and Manouane lake. The main road from the south passes between these two lakes, to serve their respective territories to the north.

The "Baie du chien (dog bay)", 40 km (25 mi) deep, which is receiving water from lakes Sarto and Lortie, is located north of Lake Manouane. Kanawata Aeroparc, which has a 3,000 ft × 100 ft (914 m × 30 m) runway with refuelling, is located near the entrance (south side) of the "Baie du chien" allows visitors to travel to various hunting and fishing camps furnished by providers in the region. The herons island is located in middle of the lake, almost opposite the "Baie aux dorés", located on the west side, in the middle of the lake. While the "Baie au calumet" (Pipe Bay to pipe) is located to the east (about the center of the lake) and receive water from the lake Drouin.

A dam was built at the mouth (northeast) of Manouane lake, at the bottom of a long strait of 7 km long, allowing the road to cross the river by the east side and serve in territories more north.

Manouane lake is 18 km (11 mi) long, including the long bay in the northeast, forming the bulge of the Manouane River. This lake is 8.2 km (5.1 mi) in width measured between the bay near of the airport (north-west) and the "Baie au calumet", located east of the lake. The lake drains into the river, which runs 4.2 kilometers (2.6 mi) from the dam to the mouth of the lake empties into the lake Châteauvert, located to the east. Manouane River is one of the five main tributaries of the Saint-Maurice River, where it discharges at the opposite side of the village of Wemotaci, located about 115 km northeast of the city of La Tuque in Haute-Mauricie.

The territory of Lake Manouane is entirely in forested area. On the economic front, the tourist activities take special development under the aegis of First Nations communities in the region.

== See also ==
- List of lakes of Canada
