= Cubuy River (Naguabo, Puerto Rico) =

River of Puerto Rico

- Native name: Río Cubuy (Spanish)

Location
- Commonwealth: Puerto Rico
- Municipality: Naguabo

Physical characteristics
- Source
  - location: Sierra de Luquillo in Naguabo close to El Toro.
  - coordinates: 18.2521781°N 65.7857184°W
- Mouth
  - location: Blanco River, Naguabo

The Cubuy River is a river of Puerto Rico located in El Yunque National Forest.

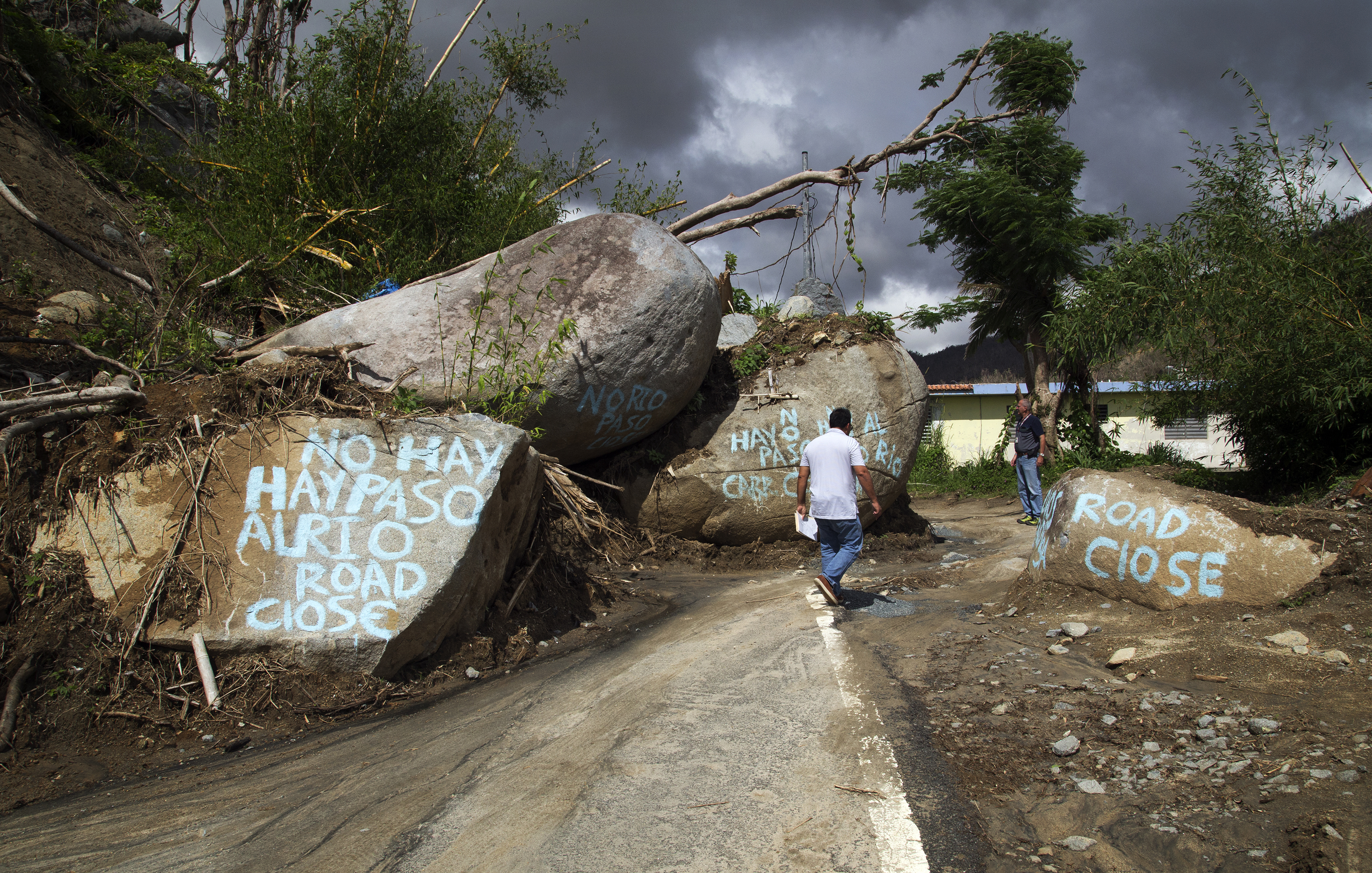
Roads closed near Cubuy after Hurricane Maria (2017)

== See also ==
- List of rivers of Puerto Rico
