= Manouane River (La Tuque) =

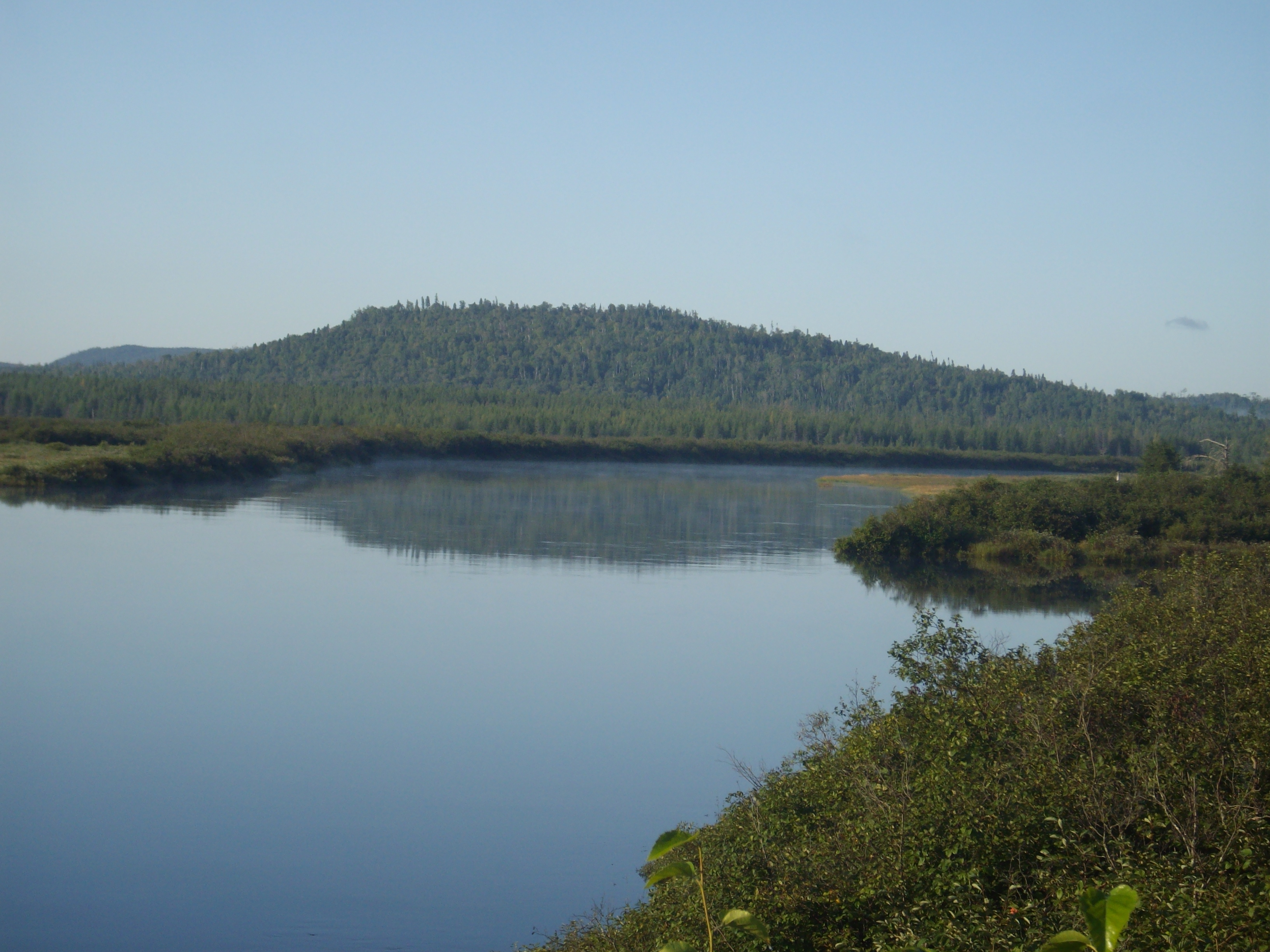

Physical characteristics
- Mouth
  - location: St. Maurice River
  - coordinates: 47.89667°N 73.80666°W

Basin features
- River system: St. Lawrence River
- Cities: La Tuque, Quebec, Canada

The Manouane River flows from west to east in the Haute-Mauricie (Upper-Mauricie), at northwest of La Tuque, in the administrative region of Lanaudière and Mauricie, in the Province of Quebec, Canada. The river basin is mostly covered by forest.

== Geography ==
Manouane River is one of the five major tributaries of the Saint-Maurice River, where it discharges opposite to the village of Wemotaci, located about 115 km north of La Tuque in Upper Mauricie. The mouth of Manouane River is located between Chute Allard dam and Gouin reservoir dam (at the head of Saint-Maurice River).

Manouane River quenches including several large bodies of water, such as lakes Châteauvert, Manouane and Kempt.

The White River (La Tuque) (flowing north-east and north-south at the end of his course) is the main tributary of the Manouane River; it discharges on the left bank at 1.6 km from the mouth of the Manouane river. The watershed of the White River (La Tuque) covers the area north of the Manouane river basin.

== Toponymy ==
The name "Manouane" (La Tuque) is of Native American origin was officially registered on December 5, 1968, at the Bank of place names of the Commission de toponymie du Québec (Geographical Names Board of Québec)

== See also ==
- La Tuque
- Saint-Maurice River
- Lake Manouane
- Châteauvert Lake (La Tuque)
- Lake Manouane
- Kempt Lake (Matawinie)
- Mauricie
- Manawan, Canadian Indian reserve
