= PDGA World Championships =

Annual disc golf event

The PDGA Disc Golf World Championships is one of four major championships in the sport of disc golf, along with the United States Disc Golf Championship, the European Open, and the PDGA Champions Cup. Held annually since 1982, the event crowns world champions in several divisions in the professional disc golf fields. Since 1983, male and female competitors have played at the same venue every year.

There have been 18 different Champions in the Men's event with an average field of 155 competitors, and 17 different Champions in the Women's event with an average field of 26. PDGA Worlds has been held in 19 US states as well as Toronto, Canada for the 1987 edition.

Starting in 2017 the Open Men's and Women's divisions began playing in one tournament, while the age-based divisions play in a separate World Championships. This allows the potential to be the world champion in both an Open division and an age-based division. In 2017, the "Final 9" round was eliminated from the Championship format. This was a card of the top 4 competitors (or occasionally more) playing a 9-hole final round without any other competitors in the field.

The 2020 PDGA World Championships were cancelled on June 1, 2020, due to the COVID-19 pandemic. This included the PDGA Professional Disc Golf World Championships in Odgen, Utah, the PDGA Junior Disc Golf World Championships in Emporia, Kansas, the PDGA Amateur Disc Golf Championships in Orlando, Florida, and the PDGA Professional Masters Disc Golf Championships in Johnson City, Tennessee. "All four events will run in the same host cities in 2021, with previously awarded 2021 World Championship bids moving back to 2022," announced the PDGA, citing international travel concerns, an inability to allow spectators, the member experience, and the difficulty of postponing the events as reasons for this decision. "Rescheduling events now, with only two to three months of lead time to make these new arrangements and execute required contracts, puts a considerable strain on our partners. Pushing these decisions out by an additional month or more, with no clear end dates on international travel restrictions, will further hinder our hosts' abilities to successfully run these events."

On December 20, 2023, PDGA announced that the upcoming 2025 world championships will be held for the first time outside of North America in Finland, in the cities of Tampere and Nokia located in the Pirkanmaa region.

== Mixed Open World Champions ==
Year	Date	Location	Champion	PDGA#	Hometown	Prize	Stroke Margin	Winning score	Runner up	Second Runner Up	Field Size	Results
1982	Jul 30 - Aug 01	Los Angeles, California	Harold Duvall	2018	Rock Hill, South Carolina	x	1	(72-72-46-49=239)	Dave Dunipace / Joe Ursino	x	75	PDGA
1983	Jul 29 - 31	Huntsville, Alabama	Jeff Watson	1406	Sarasota, Florida	x	5	(46-47-48-43-46-44=274)	Tom Monroe	Lew Satterfield	120	PDGA
1984	Jul 26 - 29	Rochester, New York	Sam Ferrans	2872	Rancho Cucamonga, California	$1,000	5	(49-46-46-45-46=232)	Johnny Sias	David Greenwell	141	PDGA
1985	Jul 26 - 28	Tulsa, Oklahoma	Harold Duvall (2)	2018	Rock Hill, South Carolina	$2,000	2	(48-51-43-42-53-47=284)	Eric Marx / Snapper Pierson	x	200	PDGA
1986	Jul 23 - 26	Charlotte, North Carolina	Johnny Sias	1700	Lavalette, West Virginia	$1,090	7	(46-46-42-48-43-49=274)	Clint Mcclellan / Geoff Lissaman	x	166	PDGA
1987	Aug 25 - 30	Toronto, Ontario, Canada	Gregg Hosfeld	1602	Orlando, Florida	$2,500	Playoff	(48-50-50-46-45-47-42=328)	Michael Sullivan	Steve Wisecup	143	PDGA
1988	Sep 7 - 10	Cincinnati, Ohio	John Ahart	3455	Fontana, California	$3,900	2	(47-46-47-50-51-53=294)	Sam Ferrans / Randy Amann	x	209	PDGA
1989	Aug 21 - 26	Waterloo, Iowa/Cedar Falls, Iowa	Steve Wisecup	1467	Ontario, California	$2,000	3	(46-42-48-47-44-48-49-49=373)	John Ahart	Randy Amann	158	PDGA
1990	Oct 9 - 13	Scottsdale, Arizona/Mesa, Arizona/Fountain Hills, Arizona	Ken Climo	4297	Clearwater, Florida	$2,042	1	(43-47-43-47-45-45-45-46-46-45=452)	Sam Grizzaffi	John Ahart	180	PDGA
1991	Aug 21 - 24	Dayton, Ohio	Ken Climo (2)	4297	Clearwater, Florida	$2,700	10	(45-48-48-49-48-42-41=321)	Eric Marx	Michael Sullivan	160	PDGA
1992	Aug 17 - 22	Detroit, Michigan	Ken Climo (3)	4297	Clearwater, Florida	$3,500	9	(44-43-46-41-53-47-45-42-52-29=442)	"Crazy" John Brooks	Steve Valencia/Jeff Malton	160	PDGA
1993	Jun 6 - 12	Huntsville, Alabama	Ken Climo (4)	4297	Clearwater, Florida	$2,539	4	(47-44-45-46-43-45-50-45-44-25=434)	Dean Tannock	Mitch McClellan	136	PDGA
1994	Aug 2 - 7	Port Arthur, Texas	Ken Climo (5)	4297	Clearwater, Florida	$2,500	18	(47-60-47-45-42-45-46-54-50-27=463)	Joe Mela	Mike Sayre	151	PDGA
1995	Aug 13 - 19	Port Arthur, Texas	Ken Climo (6)	4297	Clearwater, Florida	$2,350	4	(46-50-41-50-41-45-47-53-48-27=448)	Mike Randolph	"Crazy" John Brooks	114	PDGA
1996	Aug 6 - 10	South Bend, Indiana	Ken Climo (7)	4297	Clearwater, Florida	$3,600	3	(48-49-48-40-51-49-44-42-41-20=432)	Geoff Lissaman	Brad Hammock	160	PDGA
1997	Aug 12 - 17	Charlotte, North Carolina	Ken Climo (8)	4297	Clearwater, Florida	$3,000	7	(45-50-48-47-47-46-49-46-49-23=450)	Scott Stokely	Ron Russell	157	PDGA
1998	Aug 3 - 8	Cincinnati, Ohio	Ken Climo (9)	4297	Clearwater, Florida	$3,581	4	(47-46-47-49-48-47-48-46-26=404)	Scott Stokely	Scott Martin	177	PDGA
1999	Aug 10 - 14	Rochester, New York	Ron Russell	9999	Jacksonville, Florida	$4,000	4	(46-45-43-45-46-45-46-42-48-26=432)	Ken Climo	Barry Schultz	173	PDGA
2000	Aug 1 - 5	Ann Arbor, Michigan	Ken Climo (10)	4297	Clearwater, Florida	$7,303	8	(62-61-60-45-50-49-61-25=413)	Barry Schultz	Jesper Lundmark	238	PDGA
2001	Aug 7 - 11	St Paul, Minnesota	Cameron Todd	12827	Darlington, South Carolina	$3,065	6	(53-49-47-53-52-53-52-46-26=431)	Steve Rico	Eric Tracy	203	PDGA
2002	Aug 6 - 10	Houston, Texas	Ken Climo (11)	4297	Clearwater, Florida	$4,500	14	(51-47-44-52-48-45-43-46-46-25=447)	Steve Rico	Ron Russell	127	PDGA
2003	Aug 11 - 16	Flagstaff, Arizona	Barry Schultz	6840	Charlotte, North Carolina	$5,000	6	(45-49-67-48-49-48-50-27=383)	Markus Källström	Mike Randolph / Ron Russell	150	PDGA
2004	Aug 9 - 14	Des Moines, Iowa	Barry Schultz (2)	6840	Charlotte, North Carolina	$5,300	9	(41-53-55-55-42-54-43-51-49-28=471)	Ken Climo	Brian Schweberger	154	PDGA
2005	Jul 25 - 30	Allentown, Pennsylvania	Nate Doss	11794	Bend, Oregon	$5,000	3	(59-49-55-52-62-52-50-52-30=461)	Barry Schultz / Matthew Orum	x	130	PDGA
2006	Aug 9 - 12	Augusta, Georgia	Ken Climo (12)	4297	Clearwater, Florida	$5,500	5	(51-50-45-45-65-47-46-23=372)	Nate Doss	Avery Jenkins	125	PDGA
2007	Aug 1 - 5	Highbridge, Wisconsin	Nate Doss (2)	11794	Bend, Oregon	$5,500	1	(53-49-57-50-49-58-54-26=396)	Markus Källström	Cale Leiviska	142	PDGA
2008	Aug 11 - 16	Kalamazoo/Battle Creek, Michigan	David Feldberg	12626	Eatonton, Georgia	$6,000	14	(53-49-57-50-49-58-54-26=396)	Nate Doss	Mike Randolph	145	PDGA
2009	Jul 27 - Aug 1	Kansas City, Missouri	Avery Jenkins	7495	Pawhuska, Oklahoma	$5,500	Playoff	(53-49-50-45-56-50-46-27=376)	Josh Anthon	Matthew Orum	131	PDGA
2010	Jul 27 - 31	Crown Point, Indiana	Eric McCabe	11674	Emporia, Kansas	$5,500	5	(59-48-47-58-49-42-48-27=378)	David Feldberg / Paul Ulibarri / Josh Anthon	x	135	PDGA
2011	Aug 9 - 13	Santa Cruz, California	Nate Doss (3)	11794	Bend, Oregon	$7,000	7	(71-73-69-79-55-26=373)	Josh Anthon / Will Schusterick	x	179	PDGA
2012	Jul 14 - 21	Charlotte, North Carolina	Paul McBeth	27523	Oakhurst, California	$5,500	5	(57-48-51-56-53-47-49-26=387)	Richard Wysocki	Will Schusterick	144	PDGA
2013	Aug 3 - 10	Crown Point, Indiana	Paul McBeth (2)	27523	Oakhurst, California	$5,000	5	(52-54-49-53-46-54-45-29=382)	David Feldberg	Nikko Locastro	131	PDGA
2014	Aug 12 - 16	Portland, Oregon	Paul McBeth (3)	27523	Oakhurst, California	$5,000	Playoff	(52-54-52-53-50-56-58-28=403)	Richard Wysocki	Nate Doss	144	PDGA
2015	Aug 4 - 8	Pittsburgh, Pennsylvania	Paul McBeth (4)	27523	Oakhurst, California	$6,000	9	(58-54-59-51-51-53-30=356)	Richard Wysocki	Will Schusterick	143	PDGA
2016	Aug 6 - 13	Emporia, Kansas	Richard Wysocki	38008	Fort Mill, South Carolina	$10,000	6	(47-48-51-56-52-28=282)	Paul McBeth	Nikko Locastro	158	PDGA
2017	Jun 21 - 25	Augusta, Georgia	Richard Wysocki (2)	38008	Fort Mill, South Carolina	$12,000	8	(60-55-55-59=229)	Paul McBeth	Simon Lizotte / JohnE McCray	161	PDGA
2018	Sep 5 - 9	Jeffersonville, Vermont	Gregg Barsby	15857	Grass Valley, California	$10,000	2	(55-50-54-54-57=270)	Paul McBeth / Josh Anthon	x	228	PDGA
2019	Aug 13 - 17	Peoria, Illinois	Paul McBeth (5)	27523	Oakhurst, California	$10,000	1	(53-53-52-60-54=272)	Ricky Wysocki	James Conrad / Emerson Keith	196	PDGA
2021	June 22–26	Ogden, Utah	James Conrad	17295	Blacksburg, Virginia	$16,500	Playoff	(50+56+52+54+54=266)	Paul McBeth	Nate Sexton	209	PDGA
2022	Aug 30 - Sep 3	Emporia, Kansas	Paul McBeth (6)	27523	Oakhurst, California	$20,000	Playoff	(56-57-53-60-56=282)	Aaron Gossage	Tristan Tanner / Chris Clemons / Matthew Orum	201	PDGA
2023	Aug 30 - Sep 3	Jeffersonville, Vermont	Isaac Robinson	50670	Lawrenceville, Georgia	$30,000	2	(53-57-53-51-53=267)	Anthony Barela	Eagle McMahon / Matthew Orum	216	PDGA
2024	Aug 21 - Aug 25	Lynchburg, Virginia	Isaac Robinson (2)	50670	Lawrenceville, Georgia	$30,000	4	(57-59-61-61-62=300)	Niklas Anttila	Eagle McMahon	208	PDGA
2025	Jul 30 - Aug 3	Nokia, Finland	Gannon Buhr	75412	Urbandale, Iowa	$20,000	1	(53-60-60-53-54=280)	Aaron Gossage	Niklas Anttila	200	PDGA
2026	Aug 26 - Aug 30	Milford, Michigan	Silas Schultz	79047	Baton Rouge, Louisiana	$30,000	Playoff	(61-58-61-57-56=293	Rainers Balodis	Zachary Nash / Isaac Robinson / Jake Monn	200	PDGA

== Women's Open World Champions ==
Year	Date	Location	Champion	PDGA#	Hometown	Prize	Stroke Margin	Winning score	Runner up	Second Runner Up	Field Size	Results
1983	Jul 29 - 31	Huntsville, Alabama	Marie Jackson	2312	Cedarburg, Wisconsin	x	2	(58-55-54-53=220)	Vanessa Chambers	Ramona Hale	21	PDGA
1984	Jul 26 - 29	Rochester, New York	Marie Jackson (2)	2312	Cedarburg, Wisconsin	x	6	(56-59-56-50-57=278)	Judy Horowitz	Vanessa Chambers	25	PDGA
1985	Jul 26 - 28	Tulsa, Oklahoma	Ramona Hale	2549	Norman, Oklahoma	$500	6	(57-57-52-53-61-57=337)	Vanessa Chambers	Patti Kunkle	32	PDGA
1986	Jul 23 - 26	Charlotte, North Carolina	Vanessa Chambers	2198	Mount Pleasant, South Carolina	$415	4	(55-51-55-57-60-57=335)	Roxanne Spencer	Chris O'Cleary	24	PDGA
1987	Aug 25 - 30	Toronto, Ontario, Canada	Vanessa Chambers (2)	2198	Mount Pleasant, South Carolina	$800	1	(57-57-57-53-54-56=334)	Chris O'Cleary	Joanne Gallagher	21	PDGA
1988	Sep 7 - 10	Cincinnati, Ohio	Chris O'Cleary	3024	Atlanta, Georgia	$930	8	(59-59-51-58-56-56=339)	Elaine King	Vanessa Chambers/Joanne Gallagher	25	PDGA
1989	Aug 21 - 26	Waterloo, Iowa/Cedar Falls, Iowa	Chris O'Cleary (2)	3024	Atlanta, Georgia	$450	3	(54-52-58-56-59=279)	Amy Schiller	Elaine King	17	PDGA
1990	Oct 9 - 13	Scottsdale, Arizona/Mesa, Arizona/Fountain Hills, Arizona	Amy Schiller	4434	San Diego, California	$588	19	(58-52-56-56-53-54-52-52-51=484)	Elaine King	Terri Reinl-Carver	16	PDGA
1991	Aug 21 - 24	Dayton, Ohio	Elaine King	3090	Durham, North Carolina	$775	10	(54-56-53-57-55-56-57=388)	Susanne Giendl	Teresa Mistler	16	PDGA
1992	Aug 17 - 22	Detroit, Michigan	Elaine King (2)	3090	Durham, North Carolina	$750	11	(50-57-65-65-57-56-47-51-59=507)	Amye Jerez	Kelli Hughes	16	PDGA
1993	Jun 6 - 12	Huntsville, Alabama	Elaine King (3)	3090	Durham, North Carolina	$751	16	(52-51-54-55-55-55-54-54-30=460)	Chris O'Cleary	Beth Tanner	16	PDGA
1994	Aug 2 - 7	Port Arthur, Texas	Elaine King (4)	3090	Durham, North Carolina	$800	15	(61-53-61-55-61-50-63-56-54-26=540)	Amy Schiller	Becky Powell	25	PDGA
1995	Aug 13 - 19	Port Arthur, Texas	Becky Powell	6349	Weatherford, Texas	$650	1	(51-55-68-59-50-52-67-59-55-33=549)	Anni Kreml	Kelli Hughes	18	PDGA
1996	Aug 6 - 10	South Bend, Indiana	Beth Tanner	6123	Carrboro, North Carolina	$1,060	4	(51-55-56-54-51-66-64-55-49-29=530)	Anni Kreml	Linda Isberg	30	PDGA
1997	Aug 12 - 17	Charlotte, North Carolina	Elaine King (5)	3090	Durham, North Carolina	$1,015	25	(54-55-61-58-60-56-51-50-56-33=534)	Anni Kreml	Beth Tanner	27	PDGA
1998	Aug 3 - 8	Cincinnati, Ohio	Juliana Korver	7438	San Diego, California	$952	13	(54-58-53-57-55-63-54-58-32=484)	Elaine King	Anni Kreml	29	PDGA
1999	Aug 10 - 14	Rochester, New York	Juliana Korver (2)	7438	San Diego, California	$850	19	(54-56-56-52-51-56-51-53-51-30=510)	Elaine King	Amy Schiller	25	PDGA
2000	Aug 1 - 5	Ann Arbor, Michigan	Juliana Korver (3)	7438	San Diego, California	$1,765	9	(77-64-72-63-54-61-74-26=491)	Elaine King	Anni Kreml	26	PDGA
2001	Aug 7 - 11	St Paul, Minnesota	Juliana Korver (4)	7438	San Diego, California	$1,460	7	(57-62-63-55-57-58-57-59-32=500)	Lesli Todd	Elaine King	28	PDGA
2002	Aug 6 - 10	Houston, Texas	Des Reading	15863	Wimberley, Texas	$1,500	8	(58-52-54-60-56-53-59-54-56-31=533)	Juliana Korver	Lesli Herndon	14	PDGA
2003	Aug 11 - 16	Flagstaff, Arizona	Juliana Korver (5)	7438	San Diego, California	$1,500	11	(55-57-75-57-58-54-60-35-30=481)	Des Reading	Nadine Cosgrove	22	PDGA
2004	Aug 9 - 14	Des Moines, Iowa	Birgitta Lagerholm	15916	Solna, Sweden	$1,400	2	(55-63-63-54-57-51-64-61-69-34=571)	Des Reading	Lesli Herndon	26	PDGA
2005	Jul 25 - 30	Allentown, Pennsylvania	Des Reading (2)	15863	Wimberley, Texas	$1,750	18	(56-71-53-58-58-56-71-58-32=513)	Juliana Korver	Valarie Jenkins/Courtney Peavy	24	PDGA
2006	Aug 9 - 12	Augusta, Georgia	Des Reading (3)	15863	Wimberley, Texas	$1,800	9	(64-54-49-55-57-71-57-29=436)	Courtney Peavy/Carrie Berlogar	x	25	PDGA
2007	Aug 1 - 5	Highbridge, Wisconsin	Valarie Jenkins	17495	Bend, Oregon	$1,800	5	(66-61-58-59-52-60-59-30=445)	Des Reading	Angela Tschiggfrie	28	PDGA
2008	Aug 11 - 16	Kalamazoo/Battle Creek, Michigan	Valarie Jenkins (2)	17495	Bend, Oregon	$1,650	12	(53-49-57-50-49-58-54-26=396)	Des Reading	Liz Carr	21	PDGA
2009	Jul 27 - Aug 1	Kansas City, Missouri	Valarie Jenkins (3)	17495	Bend, Oregon	$1,600	14	(70-51-55-60-57-52-50-32=427)	Des Reading	Nicole Frazer	21	PDGA
2010	Jul 27 - Jul 31	Crown Point, Indiana	Sarah Stanhope	30397	Greenville, South Carolina	$1,450	6	(59-48-47-58-49-42-48-27=378)	Des Reading	Valarie Jenkins	18	PDGA
2011	Aug 9 - 13	Santa Cruz, California	Paige Pierce	29190	Plano, Texas	$2,000	3	(89-89-91-88-60-28=445)	Valarie Jenkins	Liz Lopez	36	PDGA
2012	Jul 14 - Jul 21	Charlotte, North Carolina	Sarah Hokom	34563	Caldwell, Idaho	$2,000	1	(50-57-56-48-52-55-53-32=403)	Valarie Jenkins	Catrina Allen	30	PDGA
2013	Aug 3 - 10	Crown Point, Indiana	Paige Pierce (2)	29190	Plano, Texas	$2,000	1	(58-63-61-59-56-59-54-35=445)	Valarie Jenkins	Catrina Allen	25	PDGA
2014	Aug 12 - 16	Portland, Oregon	Catrina Allen	44184	Pipestone, Minnesota	$2,250	2	(56-58-49-61-57-59-54-37=431)	Paige Pierce	Ragna Bygde	40	PDGA
2015	Aug 4 - 8	Pittsburgh, Pennsylvania	Paige Pierce (3)	29190	Plano, Texas	$2,500	1	(68-62-65-65-64-60-32=416)	Sarah Hokom	Catrina Allen	48	PDGA
2016	Aug 6 - 13	Emporia, Kansas	Valarie Jenkins (4)	17495	Bend, Oregon	$5,000	6	(55-64-60-55-56-29=319)	Catrina Allen/Paige Pierce	x	35	PDGA
2017	Jun 21 - 25	Augusta, Georgia	Paige Pierce (4)	29190	Plano, Texas	$5,500	5	(68-63-68-65=264)	Valarie Jenkins	Lisa Fajkus	44	PDGA
2018	Sep 5 - 9	Jeffersonville, Vermont	Paige Shue	33833	Emporia, Kansas	$5,000	6	(63-58-65-68-63=317)	Paige Pierce	Jessica Weese / Sarah Hokom	49	PDGA
2019	Aug 13-17	Peoria, Illinois	Paige Pierce (5)	29190	Plano, Texas	$5,000	5	(64-57-59-52-52=284)	Eveliina Salonen	Catrina Allen	46	PDGA
2021	Jun 22 - 26	Ogden, Utah	Catrina Allen (2)	44184	Pipestone, Minnesota	$10,000	1	(63-51-63-52-66=295)	Paige Pierce	Lisa Fajkus	70	PDGA
2022	Aug 30 - Sept 3	Emporia, Kansas	Kristin Tattar	73986	Pärnu, Estonia	$11,000	8	(58-66-64-58-59=305)	Henna Blomroos	Holyn Handley	74	PDGA
2023	Aug 30 - Sept 3	Jeffersonville, Vermont	Kristin Tattar (2)	73986	Pärnu, Estonia	$15,000	6	(54-56-60-58-59=287)	Missy Gannon	Holyn Handley	78	PDGA
2024	Aug 21 - 25	Lynchburg, Virginia	Eveliina Salonen	64927	Valkeakoski, Finland	$17,000	2	(65-64-61-67-70=327)	Kat Mertsch	Kristin Tattar	89	PDGA
2025	Jul 30 - Aug 3	Nokia, Finland	Ohn Scoggins	48976	Los Angeles, California	$15,000	Playoff	(63-63-66-71-61=324)	Iida Lehtomäki	Henna Blomroos	87	PDGA
2026	Aug 26 - Aug 30	Milford, Michigan	Eveliina Salonen	64927	Valkeakoski, Finland	$20,000	17	(63-59-59-62-56=299	Missy Gannon	Rebecca Don	92	PDGA

== Men's Masters 40+ World Champions ==
This division was named Masters until 2018.

Year	Date	Location	Champion	PDGA#	Hometown	Prize	Stroke Margin	Winning score	Runner up	Second Runner Up	Field Size	Results
1983	Jul 29 - 31	Huntsville, Alabama	Tom Monroe	33	Vestavia Hills, Alabama	x	6	x	x	x	4	PDGA
1984	Jul 26 - 29	Rochester, New York	Steve Slasor	55	Palm Bay, Florida	x	6	(43-54-45-51-51=244)	Snapper Pierson	Tom Monroe	15	PDGA
1985	Jul 26 - 28	Tulsa, Oklahoma	John David	790	Atlanta, Georgia	$350	6	(51-60-45-46-53=255)	Rick Voakes	Dan "Stork" Roddick	24	PDGA
1986	Jul 23 - 26	Charlotte, North Carolina	John David (2)	790	Atlanta, Georgia	$405	1	(51-54-51-53-51=260)	Bob Blakely	Dan "Stork" Roddick	21	PDGA
1987	Aug 25 - 30	Toronto, Ontario, Canada	Snapper Pierson	691	Coronado, California	$1,000	5	(50-50-53-48-47-46=294)	Tom Monroe	Michael Conger	33	PDGA
1988	Sep 7 - 10	Cincinnati, Ohio	Rick Voakes	2632	Bowling Green, Kentucky	$1,000	13	(48-45-49-48-48-51=289)	Tom Monroe	Alan Beaver/Michael Conger	41	PDGA
1989	Aug 21 - 26	Waterloo, Iowa/Cedar Falls, Iowa	Snapper Pierson (2)	691	Coronado, California	$750	10	(45-45-51-44-49=234)	Tom Monroe	Alan Beaver	41	PDGA
1990	Oct 9 - 13	Scottsdale, Arizona/Mesa, Arizona/Fountain Hills, Arizona	David Welty	1972	Oakland, California	$1,156	6	(46-49-50-50-47-45-46-50-53-50=486)	Tom Monroe	Alan Beaver	63	PDGA
1991	Aug 21 - 24	Dayton, Ohio	Red Whittington	1760	Pittsburgh, Pennsylvania	$1,225	2	(47-52-46-48-45-46-49=333)	Snapper Pierson	Tom Monroe	60	PDGA
1992	Aug 17 - 22	Detroit, Michigan	Eric Marx	1024	Asheville, North Carolina	$2,000	9	(54-53-46-45-43-44-46-46-55-27=459)	Snapper Pierson	Terry Thiele	75	PDGA
1993	Jun 6 - 12	Huntsville, Alabama	David Greenwell	962	Louisville, Kentucky	$1,619	6	(49-46-48-49-46-49-43-49-47-25=451)	Don Wilchek	George Coffin	82	PDGA
1994	Aug 2 - 7	Port Arthur, Texas	Stan McDaniel	2938	Indian Trail, North Carolina	$1,500	Playoff	(58-54-52-49-57-48-48-48-45-31=490)	Bob Vanderboss	Gregg Hosfeld/Gene Barfield	86	PDGA
1995	Aug 13 - 19	Port Arthur, Texas	Bob Vanderboss	2619	Goodlettsville, Tennessee	$1,400	16	(53-51-45-49-50-48-49-45-48-26=464)	David Greenwell	Lavone Wolfe	80	PDGA
1996	Aug 6 - 10	South Bend, Indiana	Stan McDaniel (2)	2938	Indian Trail, North Carolina	$1,700	4	(50-40-50-54-46-44-48-49-44-22=447)	Rick Voakes	Lavone Wolfe	80	PDGA
1997	Aug 12 - 17	Charlotte, North Carolina	Stan McDaniel (3)	2938	Indian Trail, North Carolina	$2,100	13	(48-47-47-50-43-53-52-50-47-27=464)	Bob Vanderboss	Dan Ginnelly	106	PDGA
1998	Aug 3 - 8	Cincinnati, Ohio	David Greenwell (2)	962	Louisville, Kentucky	$2,329	2	(52-51-50-50-54-48-49-50-27=431)	Jim Myers	Stan McDaniel	90	PDGA
1999	Aug 10 - 14	Rochester, New York	Jim Oates	3351	Fair Oaks, California	$2,250	Playoff	(43-48-49-48-45-45-51-52-50-26=457)	Stan McDaniel	David Greenwell	96	PDGA
2000	Aug 1 - 5	Ann Arbor, Michigan	Jim Myers	3396	Cockeysville, Maryland	$3,271	12	(59-61-67-56-54-51-61-26=435)	Glenn Triemstra/Jav Kowalski/Bob Vanderboss	x	100	PDGA
2001	Aug 7 - 11	St Paul, Minnesota	Joe Mela	2607	Bristol, Pennsylvania	$2,260	2	(52-55-49-53-55-55-51-53-28=451)	Joel Kelly	Stan McDaniel	79	PDGA
2002	Aug 6 - 10	Houston, Texas	Brad Hammock	5912	Decatur, Georgia	$2,200	8	(54-49-49-47-50-50-47-51-46-28=471)	Dean Tannock	Joel Kelly	57	PDGA
2003	Aug 11 - 16	Flagstaff, Arizona	Brad Hammock (2)	5912	Decatur, Georgia	$3,000	6	(67-49-47-50-68-48-52-33-31=445)	Jim Oates	Geoff Lissaman	88	PDGA
2004	Aug 9 - 14	Des Moines, Iowa	Brad Hammock (3)	5912	Decatur, Georgia	$3,200	19	(48-47-56-49-53-55-44-52-51-26=481)	Al Schack	Dean Tannock	86	PDGA
2005	Jul 25 - 30	Allentown, Pennsylvania	Dean Tannock	4028	Toney, Alabama	$2,500	5	(53-56-54-64-54-54-65-53-25 =478)	Larry Leonard	Jim Oates/Joel Kelly	59	PDGA
2006	Aug 9 - 12	Augusta, Georgia	Brad Hammock (4)	5912	Decatur, Georgia	$2,500	1	(45-47-57-58-48-48-49-24=376)	Joel Kelly	Dean Tannock	60	PDGA
2007	Aug 1 - 5	Highbridge, Wisconsin	Jim Oates (2)	3351	Fair Oaks, California	$2,500	7	(49-63-59-59-48-53-62-25=418)	Brad Hammock	Harold Hampton	63	PDGA
2008	Aug 11 - 16	Kalamazoo/Battle Creek, Michigan	Al Schack	3407	Sturgis, Michigan	$3,000	9	(53-49-57-50-49-58-54-26=396)	Joe Mela/Jim Oates	x	145	PDGA
2009	Jul 27 - Aug 1	Kansas City, Missouri	Phil Arthur	7289	Woodstock, Georgia	$2,600	9	(54-48-56-53-48-52-52-25=388)	Brad Hammock	Jim Oates	73	PDGA
2010	Jul 27 - Jul 31	Crown Point, Indiana	Brad Hammock (5)	5912	Decatur, Georgia	$2,500	2	(48-51-61-49-50-58-52-25=394)	Mike Moser	Patrick Brown	62	PDGA
2011	Aug 9 - 13	Santa Cruz, California	Jonathan Baldwin	18114	Scotts Valley, California	$3,600	5	(83-79-78-76-52-29=397)	Phil Arthur	Jay "Yeti" Reading	102	PDGA
2012	Jul 14 - Jul 21	Charlotte, North Carolina	Ken Climo	4297	Clearwater, Florida	$3,500	9	(55-46-59-51-52-60-46-26=395)	Barry Schultz	JohnE McCray	96	PDGA
2013	Aug 3 - 10	Crown Point, Indiana	Barry Schultz	6840	Charlotte, North Carolina	$2,000	11	(55-49-57-51-57-53-46-31=399)	Ken Climo	Jonathan Baldwin	47	PDGA
2014	Aug 12 - 16	Portland, Oregon	Ken Climo (2)	4297	Clearwater, Florida	$2,500	1	(54-54-56-60-53-53-63-31=424)	Barry Schultz	Patrick Brown	72	PDGA
2015	Aug 4 - 8	Pittsburgh, Pennsylvania	Ken Climo (3)	4297	Clearwater, Florida	$2,400	3	(56-57-64-57-60-56-27=377)	Patrick Brown	Mike Moser/Jay "Yeti" Reading	72	PDGA
2016	Aug 6 - 13	Emporia, Kansas	JohnE McCray	9852	Dover, Florida	$3,000	4	(51-58-57-49-53-29=297)	Shasta Criss	Chris Smith	79	PDGA
2017	Aug 15 - 19	Grand Rapids, Michigan	Barry Schultz (2)	6840	Charlotte, North Carolina	$2,350	6	(58-52-46-57-52-53-48-26=392)	Robert R. Bainbridge	David Feldberg	62	PDGA
2018	Aug 14 - 18	Olathe, Kansas	David Feldberg	12626	Eatonton, Georgia	$3,000	3	(51-49-49-50-49-25=273)	JohnE McCray	Barry Schultz	54	PDGA
2019	Jun 25 - 29	Jeffersonville, Vermont	David Feldberg (2)	12626	Eatonton, Georgia	$2,020	11	(59-60-55-61-57-25=317)	Barry Schultz	JohnE McCray	53	PDGA
2021	Aug 3 - 7	Johnson City, Tennessee	David Feldberg (3)	12626	Eatonton, Georgia	$5,000	1	(54-51-55-50-54-29=293)	Michael Johansen	Steve Rico/Chris Villa	81	PDGA
2022	Jul 12 - 16	Peoria, Illinois	Joe Rovere	30306	Arvada, Colorado	$5,500	1	(68-62-65-66-61-34=356)	Martin Hendel	Michael Johansen	121	PDGA
2023	Jul 11 - 15	Flagstaff, Arizona	Joe Rovere (2)	30306	Arvada, Colorado	$6,300	1	(54-51-53-49-53-27=287)	Cale Leiviska	Matthew Blakely	149	PDGA
2024	Jun 11 - 15	Emporia, Kansas	Joe Rovere (3)	30306	Arvada, Colorado	$5,300	14	(55-55-58-49-59-33=309)	Mika Laikko / Jeff Faes	x	120	PDGA
2025	Jul 1 - 5	Twin Cities, Minnesota	Paul Oman	34344	Evansville, IN	$6,500	Playoff	(55-56-52-58-60=271)	Dutch Napier	Joe Rovere	148	PDGA

== Women's Masters 40+ World Champions ==
This division was named Women's Masters until 2018.

Year	Date	Location	Champion	PDGA#	Hometown	Prize	Stroke Margin	Winning score	Runner up	Second Runner Up	Field Size	Results
1988	Sep 7 - 10	Cincinnati, Ohio	Patti Kunkle	283	Atlanta, Georgia	$150	4	(70-61-64-65=260)	Sylvia Voakes	x	2	PDGA
1992	Aug 17 - 22	Detroit, Michigan	Sharon Jenkins	5408	Hinckley, Ohio	$300	20	(56-56-70-63-60-64-61-53=483)	Sylvia Voakes	Patti Kunkle	5	PDGA
1993	Jun 6 - 12	Huntsville, Alabama	Beth Verish	2976	Sunland, California	$432	1	(53-60-60-61-56-59-61-53=463)	Sylvia Voakes	Patti Kunkle	7	PDGA
1994	Aug 2 - 7	Port Arthur, Texas	Sharon Jenkins (2)	5408	Hinckley, Ohio	$300	5	(62-60-67-63-58-58-67-62-61-30=588)	Sylvia Voakes	Linda Chandler	6	PDGA
1995	Aug 13 - 19	Port Arthur, Texas	Beth Tanner	6123	Carrboro, North Carolina	$450	21	(58-58-62-58-52-56-60-60-58=522)	Andi Young	Sylvia Voakes	8	PDGA
1997	Aug 12 - 17	Charlotte, North Carolina	Shelia L. Jackson	9081	Russellville, Arkansas	$405	5	(59-70-68-67-66-62-61-63=516)	Susan Whittington	Sharon Jenkins	5	PDGA
1998	Aug 3 - 8	Cincinnati, Ohio	Sharon Jenkins (3)	5408	Hinckley, Ohio	$351	13	(62-67-62-66-61-72-59=449)	Andi Young	Avan Eddy	5	PDGA
1999	Aug 10 - 14	Rochester, New York	Michelle Wade	4511	Las Vegas, Nevada	$400	5	(66-63-62-64-60-68-61-62-34=540)	Sharon Jenkins	Lisa Warner	7	PDGA
2000	Aug 1 - 5	Ann Arbor, Michigan	Tita Ugalde	83	Los Angeles, California	$812	7	(75-84-82-63-74-57-78=513)	Laurie Cloyes	Lisa Warner	8	PDGA
2001	Aug 7 - 11	St Paul, Minnesota	Tita Ugalde (2)	83	Los Angeles, California	$710	7	(62-63-66-58-69-67-62-65=512)	Chieko Kakimoto	Laurie Cloyes	8	PDGA
2002	Aug 6 - 10	Houston, Texas	Chieko Kakimoto	3644	Yamagata, Yamagata, Japan	$675	18	(61-59-61-63-62-61-66-63-64-36=596)	Laurie Cloyes	Andi Lehmann	6	PDGA
2003	Aug 11 - 16	Flagstaff, Arizona	Peggy Berry	14445	Laporte, Colorado	$800	8	(63-69-84-61-64-85-58-32=516)	Lisa Warner	Andi Lehmann	9	PDGA
2004	Aug 9 - 14	Des Moines, Iowa	Lisa Warner	9519	Columbus, Ohio	$960	10	(63-74-66-57-69-59-69-69-36=562)	Peggy Berry	Susan Poulin	10	PDGA
2005	Jul 25 - 30	Allentown, Pennsylvania	Anni Kreml	7879	Richmond, California	$800	18	(68-72-64-67-66-63-68-40=508)	Pam Reineke	Sheila Kirkham	8	PDGA
2006	Aug 9 - 12	Augusta, Georgia	Anni Kreml (2)	7879	Richmond, California	$1,000	20	(57-54-56-75-56-59-39=396)	Peggy Berry	Vanessa Chambers/Sheila Kirkham	8	PDGA
2007	Aug 1 - 5	Highbridge, Wisconsin	Anni Kreml (3)	7879	Richmond, California	$650	13	(66-63-60-67-62-62-31=411)	Lisa Warner	Suzette Simons	5	PDGA
2008	Aug 11 - 16	Kalamazoo/Battle Creek, Michigan	Pam Reineke	6439	Orlando, Florida	$800	20	(53-49-57-50-49-58-54-26=396)	Susan Stephens	Sheila Kirkham	6	PDGA
2009	Jul 27 - Aug 1	Kansas City, Missouri	Elaine King	3090	Durham, North Carolina	$1,200	18	(57-59-60-53-60-62-35=386)	Lydie Hellgren	Sheila Kirkham	14	PDGA
2010	Jul 27 - Jul 31	Crown Point, Indiana	Barrett White	16737	Forest Park, Illinois	$900	3	(57-51-58-60-53-54-30=363)	Elaine King	Susan Stephens	8	PDGA
2011	Aug 9 - 13	Santa Cruz, California	Carrie Berlogar	13815	Watsonville, California	$800	23	(96-98-91-87-35=407)	Sheila Kirkham	Lydie Hellgren	6	PDGA
2012	Jul 14 - Jul 21	Charlotte, North Carolina	Susan Stephens	10977	Dorr, Michigan	$950	5	(54-57-63-57-56-65-34=386)	Sheila Kirkham	Pam Reineke	9	PDGA
2013	Aug 3 - 10	Crown Point, Indiana	Barrett White (2)	16737	Forest Park, Illinois	$800	1	(71-54-58-56-57-64-33=393)	Anni Kreml	Pam Reineke	6	PDGA
2014	Aug 12 - 16	Portland, Oregon	Carrie Berlogar (2)	13815	Watsonville, California	$950	1	(66-62-58-58-64-65-39=412)	Anni Kreml	Teresa Embree	8	PDGA
2015	Aug 4 - 8	Pittsburgh, Pennsylvania	Sarah Demar	25166	Novi, Michigan	$950	19	(68-63-61-64-75-31=362)	Anni Kreml	Debbie Scott	6	PDGA
2016	Aug 6 - 13	Emporia, Kansas	Des Reading	15863	Wimberley, Texas	$1,400	7	(54-64-59-58-32=267)	Elaine King	Lesli Todd	15	PDGA
2017	Aug 15 - 19	Grand Rapids, Michigan	Elaine King (2)	3090	Durham, North Carolina	$1,055	3	(54-58-84-44-46-83-36=405)	Lesli Todd	Courtney McCoy/Des Reading	11	PDGA
2018	Aug 14 - 18	Olathe, Kansas	Kimberly Giannola	76910	Saint Joseph, Missouri	$750	Playoff	(53-50-52-52-50=283)	Courtney McCoy	Andrea Eaton	4	PDGA
2019	Jun 25 - 29	Jeffersonville, Vermont	Elaine King (3)	3090	Durham, North Carolina	$970	15	(87-60-67-61-30=305)	Susan Stephens	Natalie Holloköi	9	PDGA
2021	Aug 3 - 7	Johnson City, Tennessee	Ohn Scoggins	48976	Los Angeles, California	$2,000	23	(51-62-51-65-52-30=311)	Elaine King	Jennifer Allen	13	PDGA
2022	Jul 12 - 16	Peoria, Illinois	Ohn Scoggins (2)	48976	Los Angeles, California	$2,150	14	(54-52-52-59-51-28=296)	Jennifer Allen	Stephanie Vincent	19	PDGA
2023	Jul 11 - 15	Flagstaff, Arizona	Ohn Scoggins (3)	48976	Los Angeles, California	$2,000	15	(48-54-51-53-54-23=283)	Holly Finley	Jennifer Allen	19	PDGA
2024	Jun 11 - 15	Emporia, Kansas	Ohn Scoggins (4)	48976	Los Angeles, California	$1,500	25	(47-47-51-50-53-35=283)	Jennifer Allen	Stephanie Vincent	13	PDGA
2025	Jul 1 - 5	Twin Cities, Minnesota	Ohn Scoggins (5)	48976	Los Angeles, California	$2,000	3	(58-63-59-61-61=302)	Jennifer Allen	Sarah Hokom	20	PDGA

== Men's Masters 50+ World Champions ==
This division was named Grandmasters until 2018.

Year	Date	Location	Champion	PDGA#	Hometown	Prize	Stroke Margin	Winning score	Runner up	Second Runner Up	Field Size	Results
1983	Jul 29 - 31	Huntsville, Alabama	"Steady" Ed Headrick/Johnny Roberts	001/115	Watsonville, California/Arvada, Colorado	x	Tie	(56-54-55-58=223)/(56-56-53-58=223)	x	Jim Olsen Jr	3	PDGA
1984	Jul 26 - 29	Rochester, New York	Jim Olsen Sr	1508	Whittier, California	x	0	(55-60-48-53=216)	x	x	1	PDGA
1985	Jul 26 - 28	Tulsa, Oklahoma	Raymond Carr	3130	La Mirada, California	$100	8	(59-62-55-57-57=290)	Jim Olsen Sr	Bill Erkenbrecher	4	PDGA
1986	Jul 23 - 26	Charlotte, North Carolina	R.L. Styles	2104	Oklahoma City, Oklahoma	$175	12	(58-54-50-57=219)	Jim Olsen Sr	"Steady" Ed Headrick	4	PDGA
1987	Aug 25 - 30	Toronto, Ontario, Canada	Paul Harris	3332	Altadena, California	$200	9	(60-56-54-53-53-59=335)	R.L. Styles	Bill Erkenbrecher	3	PDGA
1988	Sep 7 - 10	Cincinnati, Ohio	Paul Harris (2)	3332	Altadena, California	$400	1	(54-56-54-60-60=284 )	R.L. Styles	Vernon T. McCulley	7	PDGA
1989	Aug 21 - 26	Waterloo, Iowa/Cedar Falls, Iowa	Alan Ballew	2542	Knoxville, Tennessee	$300	1	(52-49-58-49-58=266)	Jim Palmeri	R.L. Styles	8	PDGA
1990	Oct 9 - 13	Scottsdale, Arizona/Mesa, Arizona/Fountain Hills, Arizona	Vernon T. Mcculley	4108	Tempe, Arizona	$396	1	(58-48-53-52-54-51-53-50-52=471)	Mike "Hoser" Williams	Tom Schot	10	PDGA
1991	Aug 21 - 24	Dayton, Ohio	Tom Schot	3303	McMinnville, Oregon	$500	Playoff	(57-53-53-55-54-50=322)	Mike "Hoser" Williams	Don Hoffman	9	PDGA
1992	Aug 17 - 22	Detroit, Michigan	Tom Monroe	33	Vestavia Hills, Alabama	$700	29	(50-46-54-58-49-53-44-43=397)	Mike "Hoser" Williams	Wendell Yokley	13	PDGA
1993	Jun 6 - 12	Huntsville, Alabama	Tom Monroe (2)	33	Vestavia Hills, Alabama	$677	33	(47-50-50-48-45-49-47-43=379)	Michael Conger	Royce Racinowski	13	PDGA
1994	Aug 2 - 7	Port Arthur, Texas	Tom Monroe (3)	33	Vestavia Hills, Alabama	$600	25	(53-53-53-53-47-49-49-53-52-27=489)	Michael Conger	Royce Racinowski	13	PDGA
1995	Aug 13 - 19	Port Arthur, Texas	Rick Voakes	2623	Bowling Green, Kentucky	$700	9	(47-48-49-49-44-45-48-52-46=428)	Tom Monroe	Michael Conger	10	PDGA
1996	Aug 6 - 10	South Bend, Indiana	Tom Monroe (4)	33	Vestavia Hills, Alabama	$975	2	(47-45-53-49-45-54-50-49-47-26=465)	Snapper Pierson	Michael Conger	29	PDGA
1997	Aug 12 - 17	Charlotte, North Carolina	Rick Voakes (2)	2623	Bowling Green, Kentucky	$1,000	13	(50-46-54-59-53-55-48-45-46=456)	Tom Monroe	Snapper Pierson	29	PDGA
1998	Aug 3 - 8	Cincinnati, Ohio	Red Whittington	1760	Pittsburgh, Pennsylvania	$1,269	10	(49-57-51-55-47-55-51-49=414)	Snapper Pierson	Glenn Henry	42	PDGA
1999	Aug 10 - 14	Rochester, New York	Tom Monroe (5)	33	Vestavia Hills, Alabama	$1,500	12	(51-48-53-49-48-50-49-48-44-28=468)	Snapper Pierson	Steve Slasor	46	PDGA
2000	Aug 1 - 5	Ann Arbor, Michigan	Tom Monroe (6)	33	Vestavia Hills, Alabama	$812	9	(68-74-62-51-58-61-70=444)	Steve Slasor	Michael Conger	22	PDGA
2001	Aug 7 - 11	St Paul, Minnesota	Snapper Pierson	691	Coronado, California	$1,460	10	(52-53-55-53-53-56-51-55=428)	Tom Monroe	Glenn Triemstra	30	PDGA
2002	Aug 6 - 10	Houston, Texas	Tom Monroe (7)	33	Vestavia Hills, Alabama	$900	10	(53-49-52-54-54-51-52-50-27=442)	Lew Satterfield	Alan Beaver	9	PDGA
2003	Aug 11 - 16	Flagstaff, Arizona	David Greenwell	962	Louisville, Kentucky	$2,250	5	(49-52-73-50-54-71-47-24=420)	Rick Voakes	Glenn Henry	50	PDGA
2004	Aug 9 - 14	Des Moines, Iowa	David Greenwell (2)	962	Louisville, Kentucky	$1,800	15	(59-52-58-49-60-52-56-55-53-28=522)	Snapper Pierson	Steve Slasor	35	PDGA
2005	Jul 25 - 30	Allentown, Pennsylvania	Rick Voakes (3)	2623	Bowling Green, Kentucky	$2,400	5	(61-57-54-60-57-53-54-53-31=480)	David Greenwell	Randy Beers	56	PDGA
2006	Aug 9 - 12	Augusta, Georgia	Rick Voakes (4)	2623	Bowling Green, Kentucky	$2,400	2	(48-48-60-49-48-50-51-30=384)	Snapper Pierson	David Greenwell	53	PDGA
2007	Aug 1 - 5	Highbridge, Wisconsin	David Greenwell (3)	962	Louisville, Kentucky	$2,000	13	(52-55-56-53-53-54-51-27=401)	Randy Beers	Rick Voakes	42	PDGA
2008	Aug 11 - 16	Kalamazoo/Battle Creek, Michigan	Gregg Hosfeld	1602	Orlando, Florida	$2,000	4	(53-49-57-50-49-58-54-26=396)	David Greenwell	Kenny Lee	36	PDGA
2009	Jul 27 - Aug 1	Kansas City, Missouri	David Greenwell (4)	962	Louisville, Kentucky	$2,400	1	(50-53-64-57-54-54-55-30=417)	Jim Myers	Gregg Hosfeld/Jim Conrad	57	PDGA
2010	Jul 27 - Jul 31	Crown Point, Indiana	Gregg Hosfeld (2)	1602	Orlando, Florida	$2,400	3	(50-49-48-49-51-63-56-28=394)	Tim Keith	Jim Myers	57	PDGA
2011	Aug 9 - 13	Santa Cruz, California	Jim Oates	3351	Fair Oaks, California	$2,600	15	(75-83-80-77-51-31=397)	David Devine	Gregg Hosfeld	71	PDGA
2012	Jul 14 - Jul 21	Charlotte, North Carolina	Johnny Sias	1700	Lavalette, West Virginia	$2,500	3	(49-48-50-54-53-46-31=331)	Gregg Hosfeld	Joe Mela	68	PDGA
2013	Aug 3 - 10	Crown Point, Indiana	Michael Raley	7846	Trabuco Canyon, California	$2,250	4	(52-53-52-44-45-62-51-33=392)	Dean Tannock	Tim Keith	57	PDGA
2014	Aug 12 - 16	Portland, Oregon	Jim Oates (2)	3351	Fair Oaks, California	$2,500	4	(57-58-57-68-47-52-51-31=421)	Craig Nielsen	Mike Loya	72	PDGA
2015	Aug 4 - 8	Pittsburgh, Pennsylvania	Joe Mela	2607	Bristol, Pennsylvania	$2,500	4	(60-66-60-53-55-64-36=394)	Laymon Gray	Eric Rainey	80	PDGA
2016	Aug 6 - 13	Emporia, Kansas	Ron Convers	9648	Blackwell, Oklahoma	$2,400	8	(52-49-50-49-49-30=279)	Eric Rainey	Joe Mela	63	PDGA
2017	Aug 15 - 19	Grand Rapids, Michigan	Ron Convers (2)	9648	Blackwell, Oklahoma	$2,340	4	(53-55-57-54-52-59-51-30=411)	Eric Rainey	Tim Keith	60	PDGA
2018	Aug 14 - 18	Olathe, Kansas	Patrick Brown	25713	Austin, Texas	$2,400	12	(53-50-52-52-50-26=283)	Ron Convers	Eric Rainey	45	PDGA
2019	Jun 25 - 29	Jeffersonville, Vermont	Ron Convers (3)	9648	Blackwell, Oklahoma	$1,950	4	(54-57-53-58-50-29=301)	Jonathan Baldwin / Kevin Babbit	x	32	PDGA
2021	Aug 3 - 7	Johnson City, Tennessee	Barry Schultz	6840	Hamptonville, North Carolina	$3,500	8	(56-45-54-53-58-30=296)	Ron Convers	Matt Peckham / Patrick Brown	55	PDGA
2022	Jul 12 - 16	Peoria, Illinois	JohnE McCray	9852	Zephyrhills, Florida	$3,550	2	(64-65-63-66-60-33=348)	Ron Convers/Barry Schultz	x	64	PDGA
2023	Jul 11 - Jun 15	Flagstaff, Arizona	Chris Smith	19983	Wichita, Kansas	$3,800	4	(52-56-57-57-52-26=300)	Brian Schweberger	Ron Convers	66	PDGA
2024	Jun 11 - 15	Emporia, Kansas	JohnE McCray (2)	9852	Zephyrhills, Florida	$3,550	1	(56-64-55-60-56-34=325)	Brian Schweberger	Justin McLuen	64	PDGA
2025	Jul 1 - 5	Twin Cities, Minnesota	JohnE McCray (3)	9852	Zephyrhills, Florida	$4,000	3	(59-56-57-57-57=286)	Anders Swärd	Brian Schweberger	74	PDGA

== Women's Masters 50+ World Champions ==
This division was named Women's Grandmasters until 2018.

Year	Date	Location	Champion	PDGA#	Hometown	Prize	Stroke Margin	Winning score	Runner up	Second Runner Up	Field Size	Results
1996	Aug 6 - 10	South Bend, Indiana	Sylvia Voakes	3360	Bowling Green, Kentucky	$430	52	(50-62-74-65-56-63-67-65=502)	Paula See	Patti Kunkle	3	PDGA
1997	Aug 12 - 17	Charlotte, North Carolina	Patti Kunkle	283	Atlanta, Georgia	$250	30	(80-73-75-76-83-70-71=528)	Linda Pace	x	2	PDGA
1998	Aug 3 - 8	Cincinnati, Ohio	Sylvia Voakes (2)	3360	Bowling Green, Kentucky	$360	114	(73-73-68-68-68-72-65=487)	Midge Erkenbrecher	Linda Fowler	3	PDGA
1999	Aug 10 - 14	Rochester, New York	Sylvia Voakes (3)	3360	Bowling Green, Kentucky	$250	52	(70-64-62-64-68-65-59-65=517)	Nancy Donnelly-Malakhoff	Patti Kunkle	4	PDGA
2004	Aug 9 - 14	Des Moines, Iowa	Sylvia Voakes (4)	3360	Bowling Green, Kentucky	$600	27	(64-67-67-72-63-63-62-63-37=558)	Susie Horn	Brooky B. Holdack	4	PDGA
2005	Jul 25 - 30	Allentown, Pennsylvania	Alicia Relano	7921	Clifton, New Jersey	$600	7	(74-70-75-81-78-75-70-38=561)	Sylvia Voakes	Susie Horn	4	PDGA
2006	Aug 9 - 12	Augusta, Georgia	Kathy Hardyman	19150	Clitherall, Minnesota	$530	38	(60-61-77-73-59-58=388)	Alicia Relano	Susie Horn	3	PDGA
2007	Aug 1 - 5	Highbridge, Wisconsin	Kathy Hardyman (2)	19150	Clitherall, Minnesota	$650	16	(61-60-64-59-63-64-29=400)	Sandy Gast	Toni Hoyman	5	PDGA
2008	Aug 11 - 16	Kalamazoo/Battle Creek, Michigan	Kathy Hardyman (3)	19150	Clitherall, Minnesota	$750	39	(53-49-57-50-49-58-54-26=396)	Sandy Gast	Sharon Jenkins	4	PDGA
2009	Jul 27 - Aug 1	Kansas City, Missouri	Kathy Hardyman (4)	19150	Clitherall, Minnesota	$800	7	(69-59-67-60-72-58-35=420)	Suzette Simons	Chieko Kakimoto	6	PDGA
2010	Jul 27 - Jul 31	Crown Point, Indiana	Kathy Hardyman (5)	19150	Clitherall, Minnesota	$550	7	(65-54-67-71-63-52-35=407)	Suzette Simons	Shelia L. Jackson	3	PDGA
2011	Aug 9 - 13	Santa Cruz, California	Anni Kreml	7879	Richmond, California	$850	36	(101-105-100-96-33=435)	Suzette Simons	Lisa Warner	7	PDGA
2012	Jul 14 - Jul 21	Charlotte, North Carolina	Anni Kreml (2)	7879	Richmond, California	$850	18	(54-53-56-57-64-58-28=370)	Sandy Gast	Andi Young	7	PDGA
2013	Aug 3 - 10	Crown Point, Indiana	Sandy Gast	6440	Orlando, Florida	$700	30	(52-54-49-53-46-54-45-29=382)	Kathy Hardyman	Suzette Simons	4	PDGA
2014	Aug 12 - 16	Portland, Oregon	Molly Barnes	27303	Portland, Oregon	$900	14	(70-67-61-62-68-66-39=433)	Sandy Gast	Kathy Hardyman	7	PDGA
2015	Aug 4 - 8	Pittsburgh, Pennsylvania	Sandra Frazer	24354	Morgantown, Indiana	$1,000	2	(72-65-71-72-76-33=389)	Suzette Simons/Elfriede Eberly	x	8	PDGA
2016	Aug 6 - 13	Emporia, Kansas	Susan Stephens	10977	Dorr, Michigan	$1,100	6	(60-68-57-59-33=277)	Donna Barr/Pam Reineke	x	10	PDGA
2017	Aug 15 - 19	Grand Rapids, Michigan	Susan Stephens (2)	10977	Dorr, Michigan	$2,350	20	(60-58-82-53-47-87-37=424)	Pam Reineke	Sandy Gast	7	PDGA
2018	Aug 14 - 18	Olathe, Kansas	Tavish Carduff	23043	Kansas City, Missouri	$550	29	(59-68-62-65=254)	Sheila Kirkham	Shigeko Sekiguchi	3	PDGA
2021	Aug 3 - 7	Johnson City, Tennessee	Nova Politte	7995	Saint Joseph, Missouri	$915	18	(59-67-58-74-33=291)	Michelle Green	Lorena Dostal	4	PDGA
2022	Jul 12 - 16	Peoria, Illinois	Nova Politte (2)	7995	Saint Joseph, Missouri	$650	2	(55-70-55-62=242)	Des Reading	Tamara Coburn	3	PDGA
2023	Jul 11 - 15	Flagstaff, Arizona	Juliana Korver	7438	Orange City, Iowa	$1,100	28	(52-52-53-55-48-30=290)	Kimberly Giannola	Nova Politte	8	PDGA
2024	Jun 11 - 15	Emporia, Kansas	Juliana Korver (2)	7438	Orange City, Iowa	$1,000	10	(51-52-55-54-44=256)	Kimberly Giannola	Valerie Steinbaum	5	PDGA
2025	Jul 1 - 5	Twin Cities, Minnesota	Juliana Korver (3)	7438	Orange City, Iowa	$1,200	10	(54-57-55-46-51=253)	Des Reading	Kimberly Giannola	7	PDGA

== Men's Masters 55+ World Champions ==
Year	Date	Location	Champion	PDGA#	Hometown	Prize	Stroke Margin	Winning score	Runner up	Second Runner Up	Field Size	Results
2019	Jun 25 - 29	Jeffersonville, Vermont	Mitch McClellan	3566	Norman, Oklahoma	$1,570	8	(67-53-62-55-56-29=322)	Eric Rainey	Timothy Jiardini	23	PDGA
2021	Aug 3 - 7	Johnson City, Tennessee	Andy Ritter	5453	Bowling Green, Kentucky	$3,000	2	(48-61-49-62-46-34=300)	Roger Reyes	Johnny Rumble Pecunia/Jerry Goff	32	PDGA
2022	Jul 12 - 16	Peoria, Illinois	Mike Forton	10124	Warren, Michigan	$3,200	Playoff	(65-69-68-67-64-35=368)	Andy Ritter	Hank Kirwan	47	PDGA
2023	Jul 11 - 15	Emporia, Kansas	Hank Kirwan	9059	Fort Collins, Colorado	$3,100	Playoff	(55-60-54-57-54-28=308)	Patrick Brown	Jerry Goff	47	PDGA
2024	Jun 11 - 15	Flagstaff, Arizona	Kevin Babbit	11110	Fort Collins, Colorado	$2,300	4	(56-69-55-63-55-37=335)	Simon Feasey	Patrick Brown	30	PDGA
2025	Jul 1 - 5	Twin Cities, Minnesota	Kevin Babbit (2)	11110	Fort Collins, Colorado	$3,200	7	(59-59-55-61-52=286)	Jay Yeti Reading	Barry Schultz	51	PDGA

== Women's Masters 55+ World Champions ==
Year	Date	Location	Champion	PDGA#	Hometown	Prize	Stroke Margin	Winning score	Runner up	Second Runner Up	Field Size	Results
2019	Jun 25 - 29	Jeffersonville, Vermont	Pam Reineke	6439	Orlando, Florida	$500	2	(72-57-63-51=243)	Christine Hellstern	Sheila Kirkham	3	PDGA
2021	Aug 3 - 7	Johnson City, Tennessee	Donna Barr	7980	Kingsport, Tennessee	$915	5	(64-73-59-70-38=304)	Pam Reineke	Sherry Herzog	4	PDGA
2022	Jul 12 - 16	Peoria, Illinois	Susan Stephens	10977	Dorr, Michigan	$1,175	Playoff	(61-63-56-65-31=276)	Sandy Gast	Lydie Hellgren	7	PDGA
2023	Jul 11 - 15	Flagstaff, Arizona	Kelly Jenkins	63232	x	$1,100	9	(62-64-58-59-28=271)	Karen Sattler	Lydie Hellgren	7	PDGA
2024	Jun 11 - 15	Emporia, Kansas	Elaine King	3090	Durham, North Carolina	$1,075	11	(49-62-56-52-51-29=299)	Kirsi Kaikkonen	Karen Sattler	8	PDGA
2025	Jul 1 - 5	Twin Cities, Minnesota	Lydie Hellgren	24010	Ry, Denmark	$1,400	2	(56-46-53-59-52=266)	Barrett White	Kirsi Kaikkonen	11	PDGA

== Men's Masters 60+ World Champions ==
This division was named Senior Grandmasters until 2018.

Year	Date	Location	Champion	PDGA#	Hometown	Prize	Stroke Margin	Winning score	Runner up	Second Runner Up	Field Size	Results
1984	Jul 26 - 29	Rochester, New York	"Steady" Ed Headrick/Jack Roddick	001/295	Watsonville, California/Shippensburg, Pennsylvania	x	Tie	(58-63-57=178)/(60-63-55=178)	x	x	2	PDGA
1985	Jul 26 - 28	Tulsa, Oklahoma	"Steady" Ed Headrick (2)	001	Watsonville, California	x	0	(62-68-56-61=247)	x	x	1	PDGA
1987	Aug 25 - 30	Toronto, Ontario, Canada	Johnny Roberts	115	Arvada, Colorado	x	1	(66-63-61-63-60-62=375)	"Steady" Ed Headrick	x	2	PDGA
1988	Sep 7 - 10	Cincinnati, Ohio	Ralph Williamson	10	Seattle, Washington	$260	6	(62-58-58-62=240)	"Steady" Ed Headrick	Jim Olsen Sr	4	PDGA
1989	Aug 21 - 26	Waterloo, Iowa/Cedar Falls, Iowa	Paul Harris	3332	Altadena, California	$150	2	(60-52-58-56=226)	"Steady" Ed Headrick	x	2	PDGA
1990	Oct 9 - 13	Scottsdale, Arizona/Mesa, Arizona/Fountain Hills, Arizona	Ralph Williamson (2)	10	Seattle, Washington	$260	10	(56-56-59-56-55-53-57-56-60=508)	Paul Harris	"Steady" Ed Headrick	6	PDGA
1991	Aug 21 - 24	Dayton, Ohio	Ralph Williamson (3)	10	Seattle, Washington	$250	9	(62-57-57-55-60-57=348)	Paul Harris	"Steady" Ed Headrick	3	PDGA
1992	Aug 17 - 22	Detroit, Michigan	Ralph Williamson (4)	10	Seattle, Washington	$400	4	(55-55-67-70-57-60-55-52=471)	Paul Harris	Richard Mcaleer	6	PDGA
1993	Jun 6 - 12	Huntsville, Alabama	Richard McAleer	5221	North Hollywood, California	$368	1	(54-56-58-62-56-61-60-60=467)	Ralph Williamson/Robert Baum	x	6	PDGA
1994	Aug 2 - 7	Port Arthur, Texas	Ralph Williamson (5)	10	Seattle, Washington	$400	33	(64-61-62-57-59-54-58-59-54=528)	Max Hilgers	Stancil Johnson	8	PDGA
1995	Aug 13 - 19	Port Arthur, Texas	Ralph Williamson (6)	10	Seattle, Washington	$450	4	(62-58-59-57-59-55-67-56-57=530)	Will Maxham	Robert Baum	8	PDGA
1996	Aug 6 - 10	South Bend, Indiana	Vernon T. McCulley	4108	Tempe, Arizona	$600	8	(48-54-62-59-52-60-60-66=461)	R.L. Styles	Peter Shive	9	PDGA
1997	Aug 12 - 17	Charlotte, North Carolina	Jim Palmeri	23	Rochester, New York	$550	53	(56-58-66-64-62-61-52-58=477)	Stancil Johnson	Ragnar Overby	7	PDGA
1998	Aug 3 - 8	Cincinnati, Ohio	Peter Shive	7240	Laramie, Wyoming	$563	4	(56-67-56-58-56-65-55=413)	Jim Palmeri	Ted Mani	10	PDGA
1999	Aug 10 - 14	Rochester, New York	Alan Ballew	2542	Knoxville, Tennessee	$575	21	(51-53-57-54-57-53-52-58-57=492)	Jim Palmeri	Peter Shive	4	PDGA
2000	Aug 1 - 5	Ann Arbor, Michigan	Will Maxham	9484	Saugus, California	$812	23	(76-76-71-57-49-68-73=470)	Lien Yu Chen	Tom Skidmore	8	PDGA
2001	Aug 7 - 11	St Paul, Minnesota	Peter Shive (2)	7240	Laramie, Wyoming	$620	7	(63-32-28-63-64-30-62-64=406)	Pete May	Donald Stephens	6	PDGA
2002	Aug 6 - 10	Houston, Texas	Peter Shive (3)	7240	Laramie, Wyoming	$750	31	(59-57-56-60-60-54-57-62-34=499)	John Tallent	Bill Richards	7	PDGA
2003	Aug 11 - 16	Flagstaff, Arizona	Peter Shive (4)	7240	Laramie, Wyoming	$800	5	(64-57-75-63-59-79-54-31=482)	Pete May	Raymond Carr	10	PDGA
2004	Aug 9 - 14	Des Moines, Iowa	Peter Shive (5)	7240	Laramie, Wyoming	$960	15	(63-56-66-54-60-60-60-61-30=510)	Alan Ballew	Jack Gilmore	10	PDGA
2005	Jul 25 - 30	Allentown, Pennsylvania	Peter Shive (6)	7240	Laramie, Wyoming	$1,000	12	(64-54-69-64-61-63-59-30=464)	Doug Aulick	"Duster" Don Hoffman	12	PDGA
2006	Aug 9 - 12	Augusta, Georgia	Peter Shive (7)	7240	Laramie, Wyoming	$1,875	2	(49-55-71-60-56-53-63-27=434 )	Pete May	Philip Ganshert/Michael Gates	19	PDGA
2007	Aug 1 - 5	Highbridge, Wisconsin	Peter Shive (8)	7240	Laramie, Wyoming	$1,350	23	(67-60-57-60-56-58-56-30=444)	"Duster" Don Hoffman	Philip Ganshert	18	PDGA
2008	Aug 11 - 16	Kalamazoo/Battle Creek, Michigan	Peter Shive (9)	7240	Laramie, Wyoming	$1,350	2	(53-49-57-50-49-58-54-26=396)	Michael Gates	Michael Conger/Danny Jefferds	16	PDGA
2009	Jul 27 - Aug 1	Kansas City, Missouri	Rick Voakes	2623	Bowling Green, Kentucky	$1,350	20	(71-54-52-59-59-55-54-33=437)	Kazuo Shirai	Peter Shive	15	PDGA
2010	Jul 27 - Jul 31	Crown Point, Indiana	Rick Voakes (2)	2623	Bowling Green, Kentucky	$1,250	21	(52-49-51-51-52-63-29=347)	Snapper Pierson	Peter Shive	14	PDGA
2011	Aug 9 - 13	Santa Cruz, California	Michael Barry	1130	Los Osos, California	$1,600	22	(79-85-91-84-57-27=423)	Rick Voakes	Michael Conger	22	PDGA
2012	Jul 14 - Jul 21	Charlotte, North Carolina	Rick Voakes (3)	2623	Bowling Green, Kentucky	$1,600	14	(48-46-52-53-49-49-55-31=383)	Randy Beers	Alan Beaver	26	PDGA
2013	Aug 3 - 10	Crown Point, Indiana	Johnny Sias	1700	Lavalette, West Virginia	$1,600	6	(50-48-61-50-57-56-54-33=409)	Rick Voakes	Alan Beaver	20	PDGA
2014	Aug 12 - 16	Portland, Oregon	Rick Voakes (4)	2623	Bowling Green, Kentucky	$2,000	7	(54-51-51-57-58-60-51-36=418)	Stan Hubbard	David Greenwell	32	PDGA
2015	Aug 4 - 8	Pittsburgh, Pennsylvania	David Greenwell	962	Louisville, Kentucky	$2,100	3	(69-64-57-61-65-68-34=418)	Jay Gobrecht	Alan Beaver	35	PDGA
2016	Aug 6 - 13	Emporia, Kansas	David Greenwell (2)	962	Louisville, Kentucky	$2,200	2	(63-55-52-51-51-30=302)	Mike Cloyes	Rick Voakes / Alan Beaver	41	PDGA
2017	Aug 15 - 19	Grand Rapids, Michigan	David Greenwell (3)	962	Louisville, Kentucky	$1,880	1	(50-50-70-53-54-76-52-32=437)	Kenny Lee	Johnny Sias	30	PDGA
2018	Aug 14 - 18	Olathe, Kansas	Kenny "Boo-Rad" Lee	14204	Manteca, California	$1,800	Playoff	(57-58-56-56-53-28=308)	Rick Voakes	David Greenwell	24	PDGA
2019	Jun 25 - 29	Jeffersonville, Vermont	David Greenwell (4)	962	Louisville, Kentucky	$1,710	2	(71-54-66-55-50-30=326)	Gregg Hosfeld	Mike Ward	26	PDGA
2021	Aug 3 - 7	Johnson City, Tennessee	Tim Keith	17661	Trussville, Alabama	$3,200	3	(47-61-51-62-52-30=303)	Eric Rainey	Eric Vandenberg/Jeff Fiedler	36	PDGA
2022	Jul 12 - 16	Peoria, Illinois	Tim Keith (2)	17661	Trussville, Alabama	$3,100	5	(53-54-52-54-51-33=297)	Mitch McClellan	Mike Ward	34	PDGA
2023	Jul 11 - 15	Flagstaff, Arizona	Tim Keith (3)	17661	Trussville, Alabama	$3,000	7	(55-55-54-60-57-30=311)	Doug Williams	Grant Garlick	44	PDGA
2024	Jun 11 - 15	Emporia, Kansas	Andrew Back	15365	Riverside, Ohio	$2,850	Playoff	(47-48-49-49-47-39)	Mitch McClellan	Tim Keith / Dean Tannock	44	PDGA
2025	Jul 1 - 5	Twin Cities, Minnesota	Ron Convers	9648	Blackwell, Oklahoma	$3,500	2	(47-48-49-49-47-39)	Tim Keith	Jeff Harper	59	PDGA

== Women's Masters 60+ World Champions ==
This division was named Women's Senior Grandmasters until 2018.

Year	Date	Location	Champion	PDGA#	Hometown	Prize	Stroke Margin	Winning score	Runner up	Second Runner Up	Field Size	Results
2002	Aug 6 - 10	Houston, Texas	Sylvia Voakes	3360	Bowling Green, Kentucky	$150	x	(70-74-71-70-40=325)	x	x	1	PDGA
2006	Aug 9 - 12	Augusta, Georgia	Sylvia Voakes (2)	3360	Bowling Green, Kentucky	$265	x	(67-66-60=193)	x	x	1	PDGA
2007	Aug 1 - 5	Highbridge, Wisconsin	Sylvia Voakes (3)	3360	Bowling Green, Kentucky	$250	x	(67-72-70-62=271)	x	x	1	PDGA
2014	Aug 12 - 16	Portland, Oregon	Toni Hoyman	18823	Philomath, Oregon	$800	12	(79-79-62-80-70-42=412)	Karen Brown	Shigeko Sekiguchi	6	PDGA
2015	Aug 4 - 8	Pittsburgh, Pennsylvania	Shigeko Sekiguchi	65543	Ryūgasaki, Ibaraki, Japan	$510	x	(74-75-79-71-75=374 )	Sylvia Voakes	x	2	PDGA
2016	Aug 6 - 13	Emporia, Kansas	Sandy Gast	6440	Orlando, Florida	$950	16	(60-74-63-62-34=293)	Kathy Hardyman	Laurie Cloyes	5	PDGA
2019	Jun 25 - 29	Jeffersonville, Vermont	Laurie Cloyes-Chupa	6169	Las Vegas, Nevada	$525	2	(71-54-66-55-50-30=326)	Suzette Simons	x	2	PDGA
2021	Aug 3 - 7	Johnson City, Tennessee	Sandy Gast (2)	6440	Orlando, Florida	$915	30	(60-75-58-69-36=298)	Andi Young	Suzette Simons	4	PDGA
2022	Jul 12 - 16	Peoria, Illinois	Pam Reineke	6439	Orlando, Florida	$1,000	12	(57-66-56-65-31=275)	Laurie Cloyes-Chupa	Andi Young	6	PDGA
2023	Jul 11 - 15	Flagstaff, Arizona	Pam Reineke (2)	6439	Orlando, Florida	$1,250	3	(60-62-56-57-63-31=329)	Peggy Berry	Kathy Hardeman	9	PDGA
2024	Jun 11 - 15	Emporia, Kansas	Amy Schiller	4434	San Diego, California	$1,000	8	(59-60-59-56-32=266)	Andi Young	Peggy Berry	5	PDGA
2025	Jul 1 - 5	Twin Cities, Minnesota	Chris O'Cleary	3024	Atlanta, Georgia	$1,400	3	(57-49-63-56-50=275)	Anni Kreml	Amy Schiller	10	PDGA

== Men's Masters 65+ World Champions ==
Year	Date	Location	Champion	PDGA#	Hometown	Prize	Stroke Margin	Winning score	Runner up	Second Runner Up	Field Size	Results
2019	Jun 25 - 29	Jeffersonville, Vermont	Johnny Sias	1700	Lavalette, West Virginia	$865	4	(84-53-66-59-29=291)	Alan Beaver	Glenn Henry	8	PDGA
2021	Aug 3 - 7	Johnson City, Tennessee	Wayne Zink	1288	Towson, Maryland	$2,100	6	(46-62-51-66-52-32=309)	Eric Marx	Geoff Hungerford	15	PDGA
2022	Jul 12 - 16	Peoria, Illinois	Jay Gobrecht	14268	Hanover, Pennsylvania	$2,000	3	(56-50-56-54-56-30=302)	J. Gary Dropcho	Kenny Lee	16	PDGA
2023	Jul 11 - 15	Flagstaff, Arizona	Jay Gobrecht (2)	14268	Hanover, Pennsylvania	$2,000	7	(51-51-54-51-52-26=285)	J. Gary Dropcho	Kenny Lee	19	PDGA
2024	Jun 11 - 15	Emporia, Kansas	Bill Rohe	73129	Centerville, Indiana	$1,850	1	(48-52-45-49-48-41=283)	Kenny Lee	Mike Ward	20	PDGA
2025	Jul 1 - 5	Twin Cities, Minnesota	Eric Rainey	41947	Broken Arrow, Oklahoma	$2,000	3	(57-47-56-52-54=266)	J. Gary Dropcho	Jim Conrad	23	PDGA

== Women's Masters 65+ World Champions ==
Year	Date	Location	Champion	PDGA#	Hometown	Prize	Stroke Margin	Winning score	Runner up	Second Runner Up	Field Size	Results
2021	Aug 3 - 7	Johnson City, Tennessee	Laurie Cloyes-Chupa	6169	Las Vegas, Nevada	$700	49	(63-87-70-83=303)	Deborah Parrish	x	2	PDGA
2023	Jul 11 - 15	Flagstaff, Arizona	Sandy Gast	6440	Orlando, Florida	$825	16	(4-56-58-57-30=255)	Laurie Cloyes-Chupa	Patti Joseph	4	PDGA
2024	Jun 11 - 15	Emporia, Kansas	Laurie Cloyes-Chupa (2)	6169	Las Vegas, Nevada	$950	2	(66-60-66-57-34=283)	Janice Z. Jones	Kathy Hardyman	6	PDGA
2025	Jul 11 - 15	Twin Cities, Minnesota	Sandy Gast (2)	6440	Orlando, Florida	$1,100	11	(56-53-60-54-52=275)	Kathy Katnip Hardyman	Janice Z Jones	8	PDGA

== Men's Masters 70+ World Champions ==
This division was named Legends until 2018.

Year	Date	Location	Champion	PDGA#	Hometown	Prize	Stroke Margin	Winning score	Runner up	Second Runner Up	Field Size	Results
1997	Aug 12 - 17	Charlotte, North Carolina	Ralph Williamson	10	Seattle, Washington	$375	35	(68-64-69-57=258)	"Steady" Ed Headrick	Jack Roddick	3	PDGA
1998	Aug 3 - 8	Cincinnati, Ohio	Ralph Williamson (2)	10	Seattle, Washington	$351	15	(63-68-61-63=255)	Ted Williams	Stancil Johnson	5	PDGA
1999	Aug 10 - 14	Rochester, New York	Ralph Williamson (3)	10	Seattle, Washington	$400	13	(69-63-55-51-=238)	Ted Williams	Paul Fein	7	PDGA
2000	Aug 1 - 5	Ann Arbor, Michigan	Ralph Williamson (4)	10	Seattle, Washington	$750	22	(76-72-54-60-26=288)	Patrick Shea	Ted Williams	6	PDGA
2001	Aug 7 - 11	St Paul, Minnesota	Ted Williams	13080	Hot Springs, North Carolina	$530	12	(61-54-59-55=229)	Jack Ekstrom	"Steady" Ed Headrick	3	PDGA
2002	Aug 6 - 10	Houston, Texas	Ted Williams (2)	13080	Hot Springs, North Carolina	$450	16	(69-73-68-71-42=323)	Jack Ekstrom	Ron Jochen	3	PDGA
2003	Aug 11 - 16	Flagstaff, Arizona	Ted Williams (3)	13080	Hot Springs, North Carolina	$700	38	(66-89-68-89-65-38=415)	Stancil Johnson	Jack Ekstrom	7	PDGA
2004	Aug 9 - 14	Des Moines, Iowa	Ted Williams (4)	13080	Hot Springs, North Carolina	$730	4	(60-62-60-56-63-34=335)	Stancil Johnson	Bill Erkenbrecher	7	PDGA
2005	Jul 25 - 30	Allentown, Pennsylvania	Ted Williams (5)	13080	Hot Springs, North Carolina	$800	5	(75-64-66-82-72-36-395=395)	Ragnar Overby	Paul "Old Goat" Fein	8	PDGA
2006	Aug 9 - 12	Augusta, Georgia	Paul "Old Goat" Fein	4031	Pottstown, Pennsylvania	$675	2	(75-80-67-39=261)	Stancil Johnson	Don Dillon	5	PDGA
2007	Aug 1 - 5	Highbridge, Wisconsin	Albert Faupel	24233	Fountain Hills, Arizona	$850	6	(76-68-64-73-38=319)	Don Dillon	Ragnar Overby	8	PDGA
2008	Aug 11 - 16	Kalamazoo/Battle Creek, Michigan	Raymond Carr	3130	La Mirada, California	$850	35	(53-49-57-50-49-58-54-26=396)	Tom Skidmore	Paul Bagwell	6	PDGA
2009	Jul 27 - Aug 1	Kansas City, Missouri	Jerry Robbins Sr	15629	Topeka, Kansas	$1,150	14	(57-59-56-59-62-35=328)	Raymond Carr	Ronald Byrd/Donald Stephens	10	PDGA
2010	Jul 27 - Jul 31	Crown Point, Indiana	Jerry Robbins Sr (2)	15629	Topeka, Kansas	$900	18	(52-59-57-57-62-53-36=376)	Bill Ball	Robert Burton	8	PDGA
2011	Aug 9 - 13	Santa Cruz, California	Peter Shive	7240	Laramie, Wyoming	$800	29	(99-92-92-102-36=421)	Jerry Robbins Sr	Bill Richards	6	PDGA
2012	Jul 14 - Jul 21	Charlotte, North Carolina	Pete May	12700	Augusta, Georgia	$800	1	(46-48-57-57-63-61-29=361)	Peter Shive	David Walters	8	PDGA
2013	Aug 3 - 10	Crown Point, Indiana	Peter Shive (2)	7240	Laramie, Wyoming	$800	23	(62-57-62-62-62-59-37=401)	Jack Gilmore	Jerry Robbins Sr	6	PDGA
2014	Aug 12 - 16	Portland, Oregon	Peter Shive (3)	7240	Laramie, Wyoming	$725	61	(65-66-59-57-63-67-39=416)	Barry Fischer	John Ross	4	PDGA
2015	Aug 4 - 8	Pittsburgh, Pennsylvania	Peter Shive (4)	7240	Laramie, Wyoming	$800	13	(70-69-70-63-64-30=366)	Chuck Hornsby	Don Hoffman	5	PDGA
2016	Aug 6 - 13	Emporia, Kansas	John Kirkland	100	Carlsbad, California	$750	4	(67-60-61-63-34=285)	Michael Gates	Jack Gilmore	4	PDGA
2017	Aug 15 - 19	Grand Rapids, Michigan	Terry Calhoun	15117	Ann Arbor, Michigan	$550	3	(62-53-52-69=236)	Carlos Rigby	John Parcak	3	PDGA
2018	Aug 14 - 18	Olathe, Kansas	Jon Graff	31145	Missoula, Montana	$900	4	(61-66-62-68=292)	Michael Conger	Rob Lee	5	PDGA
2019	Jun 25 - 29	Jeffersonville, Vermont	Rick Voakes	2623	Bowling Green, Kentucky	$525	82	(61-48-56-46=211)	John Parcak	x	2	PDGA
2021	Aug 3 - 7	Johnson City, Tennessee	Rick Voakes (2)	2632	Bowling Green, Kentucky	$1,635	10	(54-63-51-66-55-33=322)	Ron Engebretson	Mark Horn	10	PDGA
2022	Jul 12 - 16	Peoria, Illinois	Johnny Sias	1700	Lavalette, West Virginia	$1,750	10	(45-57-48-57-49-29=285)	Randy Beers	Mark Horn	14	PDGA
2023	Jul 11 - 15	Flagstaff, Arizona	Randy Beers	15188	Miami, Florida	$1,650	2	(51-54-55-56-53-26=295)	David Greenwell	Mark Horn	15	PDGA
2024	Jun 11 - 15	Emporia, Kansas	Harvey Brandt	299	Phoenix, Arizona	$1,600	1	(49-53-49-52-49-27=279)	Lavone Wolfe	Randy Beers	16	PDGA
2025	Jul 1 - 5	Twin Cities, Minnesota	Randy Beers (2)	15188	Miami, Florida	$1,800	4	(51-54-55-56-53-26=295)	Jay Gobrecht	Geoff Hungerford	17	PDGA

== Women's Masters 70+ World Champions ==
Year	Date	Location	Champion	PDGA#	Hometown	Prize	Stroke Margin	Winning score	Runner up	Second Runner Up	Field Size	Results
2025	Jul 1 - 5	Emporia, Kansas	Laurie Cloyes-Chupa	6169	Las Vegas, Nevada	$900	70	(53-63-55-65-55=291)	Angie Molitor	Sue Horn	4	PDGA

== Men's Masters 75+ World Champions ==
This division was named Senior Legends until 2018.

Year	Date	Location	Champion	PDGA#	Hometown	Prize	Stroke Margin	Winning score	Runner up	Second Runner Up	Field Size	Results
2010	Jul 27 - Jul 31	Crown Point, Indiana	Don Dillon	22726	Camp Hill, Pennsylvania	$500	6	(61-66-60-74=261)	Stancil Johnson	x	8	PDGA
2011	Aug 9 - 13	Santa Cruz, California	Carlos Rigby	48542	Alexandria, Virginia	$550	14	(67-54-72-57-=250)	Ronald Byrd	Stancil Johnson	3	PDGA
2012	Jul 14 - Jul 21	Charlotte, North Carolina	Carlos Rigby (2)	48542	Alexandria, Virginia	$500	56	(55-64-55-51=225)	Don Dillon	x	2	PDGA
2013	Aug 3 - 10	Crown Point, Indiana	Raymond Carr	3130	La Mirada, California	$500	8	(70-64-65-65=264)	Carlos Rigby	Paulie Bagwell	3	PDGA
2014	Aug 12 - 16	Portland, Oregon	Sadao Takano	65542	Yurihonjō, Japan	$850	2	(80-75-64-70-46=335)	Carlos Rigby	Jerry Robbins Sr	5	PDGA
2015	Aug 4 - 8	Pittsburgh, Pennsylvania	Carlos Rigby (3)	48542	Alexandria, Virginia	$750	27	(64-67-71-66=268)	Jerry Robbins Sr	Paulie Bagwell	3	PDGA
2016	Aug 6 - 13	Emporia, Kansas	Pete May	12700	Augusta, Georgia	$x	4	(69-61-61-61=252)	Peter Shive	Sylvia Voakes	3	PDGA
2017	Aug 15 - 19	Grand Rapids, Michigan	Pete May (2)	12700	Augusta, Georgia	$x	27	(60-52-49-68-39=268)	Donald Stephens	Jim Palmeri	4	PDGA
2018	Aug 14 - 18	Olathe, Kansas	Pete May (3)	12700	Augusta, Georgia	$575	36	(66-69-64-72=271)	Carlos Rigby	x	2	PDGA
2019	Jun 25 - 29	Jeffersonville, Vermont	Pete May (4)	12700	Augusta, Georgia	$525	11	(75-57-65-55=252)	Barry Fischer	x	2	PDGA
2021	Aug 3 - 7	Johnson City, Tennessee	Jack Gilmore	9587	Iowa City, Iowa	$700	13	(65-80-63-75=283)	Barry Fischer	x	2	PDGA
2022	Jul 12 - 16	Peoria, Illinois	Rick Honn	25403	Silver Spring, Maryland	$690	21	(54=62=53-61=230)	Bob Verish	x	2	PDGA
2025	Jul 1 - 5	Twin Cities, Minnesota	Rick Voakes	2632	Bowling Green, Kentucky	$1,000	10	(56-46-54-49-46=251)	Ron Engebretson	Mark Horn	6	PDGA

== Men's Masters 80+ World Champions ==
This division was named Grand Legends until 2018.

Year	Date	Location	Champion	PDGA#	Hometown	Prize	Stroke Margin	Winning score	Runner up	Second Runner Up	Field Size	Results
2015	Aug 4 - 8	Pittsburgh, Pennsylvania	Ronald Byrd	27572	Rio Rancho, New Mexico	$750	31	(66-72-76-73=287)	Ragnar Overby	Paul "Old Goat" Fein	3	PDGA
2016	Aug 6 - 13	Emporia, Kansas	Carlos Rigby	48542	Alexandria, Virginia	$520	5	(74-67-70-71=282)	Ronald Byrd	x	2	PDGA
2019	Jun 25 - 29	Jeffersonville, Vermont	Carlos Rigby (2)	48542	Alexandria, Virginia	$525	28	(84-63-71-69=287)	Donald Stephens	x	2	PDGA
2021	Aug 3 - 7	Johnson City, Tennessee	Pete May	12700	Augusta, Georgia	x	18	(65+78+66+76=285)	Carlos Rigby	$x	2	PDGA
2022	Jul 12 - 16	Peoria, Illinois	Pete May (2)	12700	Augusta, Georgia	$650	6	(55+70+55+67=247)	Jack Gilmore	Carlos Rigby	3	PDGA
2023	Jul 11 - 15	Flagstaff, Arizona	Carlos Rigby (3)	48542	Alexandria, Virginia	$1,650	138	(98-64-66-63=291)	Spencer Rigby	Daniel Polatis	3	PDGA
2024	Jun 11 - 15	Emporia, Kansas	Pete May (3)	127002	Augusta, Georgia	$600	7	(68-79-69-63=279)	Jack Gilmore	Carlos Rigby	3	PDGA
