= Stockley =

Stockley may refer to:

== Places ==
=== United States ===
- Stockley, Delaware, an unincorporated community

=== United Kingdom ===
- Stockley, Devon, a village
- Stockley, County Durham, formerly a civil parish
- Stockley, Wiltshire, a village
- Stockley Academy, a secondary school in London
- Stockley Park, a business estate in London

== Other uses ==
- Stockley (surname)

== See also ==
- Stockleigh (disambiguation)
- Stokley (disambiguation)
