= Steakley =

Steakley is a surname. Notable people with the surname include:

- Douglas Steakley (born 1944), American metalsmith and photographer
- John Steakley (1951–2010), American author
- Zollie Steakley (1908–1992), American judge

== See also ==
- Steckley
