= Okehampton Hamlets =

Civil parish in Devon, England

Coordinates: 50.741°N 3.978°W

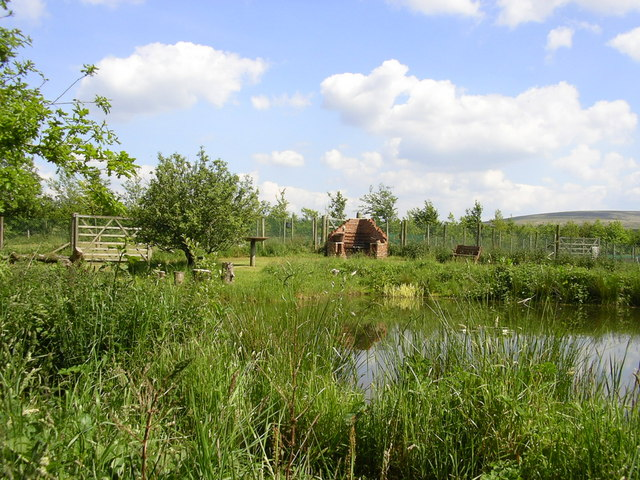
- Northlake

- Location within Devon
- Population: 1,765 (2022)
- OS grid reference: SX6095
- Civil parish: Okehampton Hamlets
- District: West Devon
- Shire county: Devon
- Region: South West
- Country: England
- Sovereign state: United Kingdom
- Post town: OKEHAMPTON
- Postcode district: EX20
- Dialling code: 01837
- Police: Devon and Cornwall
- Fire: Devon and Somerset
- Ambulance: South Western
- UK Parliament: Torridge and West Devon

Okehampton Hamlets is a civil parish in the Borough of West Devon and the English county of Devon, it runs independently from the Okehampton Town Council, meetings are held at the Meldon Village Hall.

The Parish of Okehampton Hamlets is a rural parish situated in West Devon. It is made up of the hamlets of Brightley, Southcott, Meldon and Stockley. The parish occupies 15.48 square miles and it has an estimated population of 1,765.

The hamlet of Southcott, which is predominantly agricultural with a number of small agricultural enterprises, having merged into one larger agricultural unit to secure the fragile agricultural community which has struggled in the past.

The hamlet of Brightley lies north of Okehampton. The River Okement runs through the hamlet dividing Abbeyford Woods from the flat farmland. Farming is the main commercial activity due to the decline of forestry activity in Abbeyford Woods. The leat which once powered Brightley Mill can still be seen and just inside the hamlet at Brightley Farm stands a wall, dating back to the 12th century, on the site of an ancient Abbey, hence the name Abbeyford Woods.

The hamlet of Meldon, which is rich in industrial archaeological remains, is home to Meldon Dam which across the ravine towards Meldon Viaduct which is now part of the National Cycle Route and a network of paths around Meldon Quarries, now a geological Site of Special Scientific Interest.

The Meldon Woods belong to Okehampton Hamlets Parish Council and the Council is working with the Dartmoor National Park Authority to reintroduce traditional coppicing techniques to increase biodiversity and as a result the woodland now supports a variety of wildlife including roe deer, foxes, wrens and tree creepers and much more.

== Abbeyford Woods ==
Abbeyford Woods, which is presumably part of the Hamlet of Brightley, is a biodiverse woodland which consists of a variety of trees such as oak, beech and Douglas fir and is home to a wide variety of common woodland wildlife, it was once a popular mountain biking destination in the late 1990s early 2000s and was home to a variety of Freeride (mountain biking) features and was maintained by okefreeriders before their disbandment in 2011.

The forest, which is now used for local police training and a popular spot for campers and dog walkers and mountain bikers alike, is currently managed by the Forestry Commission and was once home to an ancient abbey. In addition to the 400+ residents counted in 2001, an additional 455 houses have been built including those of the Romansfield estate, many more houses are planned to be, or are being built so the population estimate will increase.
