= MTV Sports =

- Created by: Patrick Byrnes
- Starring: Dan Cortese, Gabrielle Reece
- Country of origin: United States
- Original language: English
- No. of episodes: ?

Production
- Executive producers: Joel Stillerman; Carol Donovan
- Running time: 30 minutes
- Production company: MTV

Original release
- Network: MTV
- Release: January 25, 1992 – June 19, 1997

MTV Sports is a show that ran on MTV from 1992 to 1997. Dan Cortese hosted the reality sports show featuring radical sports from around the country. It was later hosted by athlete/model Gabrielle Reece from 1993 to 1995.

== Notable guests ==
- Dean Cain
- Rich Hopkins
- Scott Stokely

== Awards and nominations ==
Year	Award	Category	Result	Recipient(s)
1993	Emmy	Outstanding Edited Sports Series/Anthology	Won	Patrick Byrnes
1995	Cable Ace	Sports Information Series	Won	Carol Donovan (executive producer) Joel Stillerman (executive producer); Scott Messick (producer); John G. Hofmann (segment producer); Douglas Anderson (associate producer); Christopher Martello (associate producer)
