= Stokely =

Stokely is a given name and a surname. Notable people with the name include:

== Given name ==
- Stokely Carmichael (1941–1998), American civil rights activist
- Stokely Hathaway (born 1990), American wrestler and wrestling manager

== Surname ==
- Samuel Stokely (1796–1861), American politician from Ohio
- Scott Stokely (born 1969), American disc golfer
- Tim Stokely (born 1983), British businessman, founder of OnlyFans

== See also ==
- Stokely vegetables, a canned food brand currently owned by Seneca Foods
- Stokley (disambiguation)
- Stokeley, a 2018 album by Ski Mask the Slump God
