= Stokley =

Stokley may refer to:

- Stokley, Missouri, an unincorporated community

== People with the given name ==
- Stokley Williams (born 1967), American musician

== People with the surname ==
- Brandon Stokley (born 1976), American football player
- Jimmy Stokley, member of the American band Exile
- Nelson Stokley (1944–2010), American football player and coach
- William S. Stokley (1823–1902), American politician

== See also ==
- Stockley (disambiguation)
- Stokely
- Stokeley, a 2018 album by Ski Mask the Slump God
