= Eric McCabe =

American disc golfer

Personal information
- Full name: Eric McCabe
- Nickname: EMAC
- Nationality: United States
- Born: Emporia, KS
- Height: 5 ft 8 in (173 cm)

Sport
- Sport: Disc golf
- Turned pro: 2000

Eric McCabe is an American professional disc golfer, tournament director, and course designer from Emporia, Kansas. He won the PDGA Professional World Championships in 2010.

McCabe began running the Emporia Open in 2003, renaming it the Glass Blown Open. He has overseen the growth of the Glass Blown Open from an 88-player B-Tier tournament to a record-breaking National Tour event with more than 1600 competitors in 2018 Courses that he has designed are featured in the event, and have also been used during the 2016 PDGA Professional World Championships.

== Professional career ==
=== Notable wins ===
| Year | Tournament | Tier | Stroke Margin | Winning Score | Runner Up | Prize Money |
|---|---|---|---|---|---|---|
| 2008 | The Players Cup | M | -1 | (58-63-54=175) | Gregg Barsby | $3,500 |
| 2010 | PDGA World Championships | M | -5 | (59-48-47-58-49-42-48-27=378) | David Feldberg | $5,500 |

=== Summary ===
| Competition Tier | Wins | 2nd | 3rd | Top-5 | Top-25 | Events |
|---|---|---|---|---|---|---|
| World Championships | 1 | 0 | 0 | 1 | 5 | 9 |
| Other Majors | 1 | 1 | 1 | 4 | 13 | 20 |
| National Tour | 0 | 2 | 3 | 10 | 54 | 63 |

=== Annual statistics ===
| Year | Events | Wins | Top 3 | Earnings | $ / Event | Rating^{†} | World Rankings^{†} |
|---|---|---|---|---|---|---|---|
| 2000 | 4 | 0 | 2 | $260 | $65.00 | 980 | - |
| 2001 | 6 | 1 | 2 | $1,052 | $175.33 | 984 | - |
| 2002 | 10 | 0 | 3 | $1,125 | $112.50 | 985 | - |
| 2003 | 18 | 3 | 8 | $4,672 | $259.56 | 1001 | - |
| 2004 | 17 | 4 | 8 | $4,041 | $237.71 | 1002 | - |
| 2005 | 15 | 3 | 9 | $3,022 | $201.47 | 1010 | 78 |
| 2006 | 19 | 6 | 14 | $9,993 | $525.95 | 1018 | 13 |
| 2007 | 26 | 8 | 13 | $13,839 | $532.27 | 1018 | 14 |
| 2008 | 35 | 16 | 26 | $29,418 | $840.51 | 1029 | 9 |
| 2009 | 34 | 11 | 17 | $14,401 | $423.56 | 1022 | 35 |
| 2010 | 34 | 9 | 18 | $21,725 | $638.97 | 1025 | 10 |
| 2011 | 34 | 9 | 16 | $18,262 | $537.12 | 1027 | 8 |
| 2012 | 29 | 4 | 11 | $14,290 | $492.76 | 1027 | 20 |
| 2013 | 22 | 1 | 7 | $6,697 | $304.41 | 1014 | 42 |
| 2014 | 22 | 3 | 8 | $8,666 | $393.91 | 1014 | 57 |
| 2015 | 22 | 3 | 8 | $9,835 | $447.05 | 1011 | 53 |
| 2016 | 8 | 3 | 3 | $4,905 | $613.13 | 1018 | - |
| Career | 355 | 84 | 173 | $166,203 | $468.18 | - | - |

^{†}At Year End

== Equipment ==
McCabe has been sponsored by Dynamic Discs (DD) since 2013, which is part of the Trilogy partnership with Latitude 64 (L64) and Westside Discs (WD). He has two signature discs, the EMAC Truth and the Mercy. In 2020 Dynamic Discs released the EMac Judge. He commonly carries a combination of the following discs in competition:

Drivers

- Ballista Pro (L64)
- Convict (DD)
- Defender (DD)
- Enforcer (DD)
- Felon (DD)
- Renegade (DD)
- Trespass (DD)

Midranges

- Justice (DD)
- EMAC Truth (DD)
- Verdict (DD)
- Warrant (DD)

Putters

- Mercy (DD)
- Warrden (DD)
- Sarek (L64)
- Pure (L64)
- Shield (WD)
