= Southcott, West Devon =

Hamlet in Devon, England

Southcott
- Hamlet
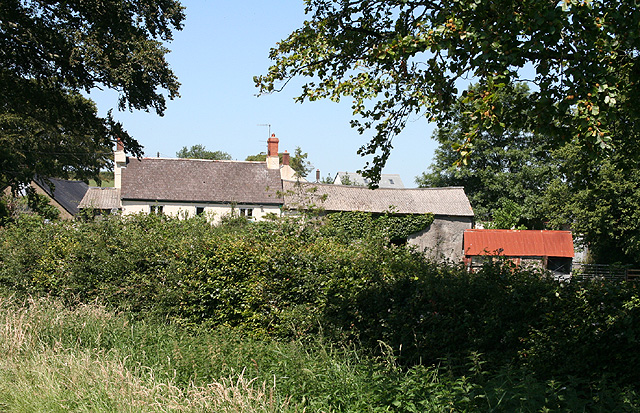
- Southcott Farm

- Location within Devon
- OS grid reference: SX 54999 94840
- Civil parish: Okehampton Hamlets
- Unitary authority: West Devon
- Ceremonial county: Devon
- Region: South West
- Country: England
- Sovereign state: United Kingdom
- Post town: OKEHAMPTON
- Postcode district: EX20
- Dialling code: 01837
- Police: Devon and Cornwall
- Fire: Devon and Somerset
- Ambulance: South Western
- UK Parliament: Torridge and West Devon

Southcott is a hamlet in the civil parish of Okehampton Hamlets, in West Devon, England. The hamlet name is Anglo Saxon in origin and means 'southern cottage'.

The hamlet, little more than one road of cottages, is located to the west of the town of Okehampton and north of Dartmoor National Park.

== Southcott Cross ==
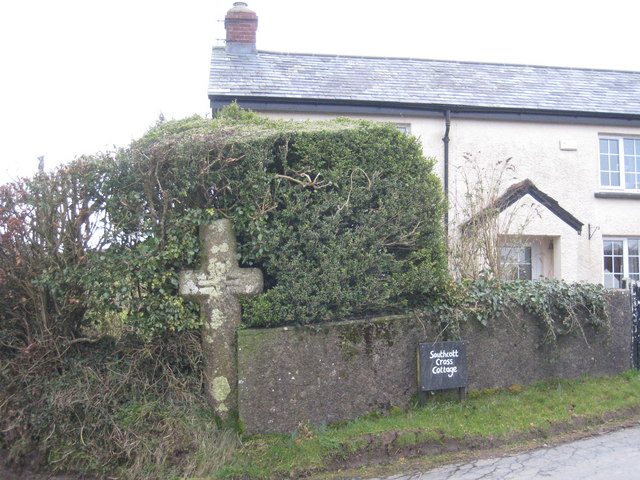
Southcott Cross

Southcott Cross is a unique Dartmoor cross. The cross is 6'3" tall and is octagonal in shape. The Stone cross is unique as it depicts two humans, one on each side. At the front is a Crucifix and the reverse is believed to be the Virgin Mary praying, as the figure's hand are depicted together.

It is believed that the cross was put there in the c13th Century as a waymaker cross to the Cistercian monks of the nearby Brightley Priory, on the bank of the West Okement River.
