= Steckle =

Steckle is a surname. It may refer to:

- Allen Steckle (1872–1938), American football player and coach
- Paul Steckle (born 1942), Canadian politician and former Canadian Member of Parliament
- Robert Steckle (born 1930), Canadian Greco-Roman and freestyle wrestler

== See also ==
- Steckley
