= Johnny Sias =

American disc golfer, world champion, notable athlete from West Virginia

Johnny Sias (born 1952) is a professional disc golfer, tournament director, and course designer from Lavalette, West Virginia. He became a professional in 1983 and joined the Professional Disc Golf Association in 1986 after finishing 15th at the 1985 PDGA World Disc Golf Championships in Tulsa, Oklahoma.

== Professional career ==
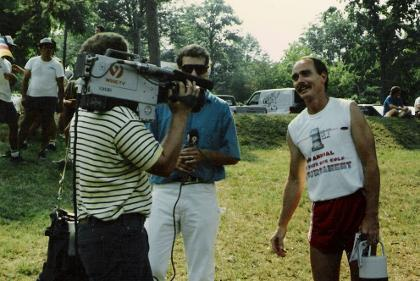
Johnny Sias being interviewed after winning the 1986 PDGA World Championship in Charlotte, North Carolina.

Sias won the 1986 PDGA Professional World Championship in Charlotte, North Carolina, by seven strokes over Clint Mcclellan and Geoff Lissaman. He has also won the 2012 PDGA Grand Masters World Championship, the 2013 Senior Grand Masters World Championship, the 2019 PDGA Masters 65+ World Championship, and the 2022 PDGA Masters 70+ World Championship. Sias finished second, five strokes behind winner Sam Ferrans, at the 1984 PDGA Professional World Championship in Rochester, New York. In 242 career PDGA events, Sias has 77 wins and amassed $51,164 in winnings. He was inducted into the Disc Golf Hall of Fame in 2001. In 2016, he was the first person inducted into the West Virginia Disc Golf Hall of Fame. He was Tournament Director for the 2021 Beech Fork Open at the Beech Fork State Park Disc Golf Course, which he co-designed with Phil Bryan.

== Sponsorships ==
Sias is sponsored by Innova Champion Discs on their All Stars Team.

== Personal life ==
Sias was born in Huntington, West Virginia, and raised in Lincoln County, West Virginia. He married his wife, Adele, in 1978.
