= Stockleigh =

Stockleigh may refer to the following places:

- Stockleigh, Queensland, Australia
- Stockleigh English, Devon, England
- Stockleigh Pomeroy, Devon, England

== See also ==
- Stockley (disambiguation)
