= Steckley =

Steckley is a surname. Notable people with the surname include:

- Dawn Steckley (died early 2000s), Canadian figure skater
- John Steckley (born 1949), Canadian scholar specializing in Native American studies and the indigenous languages of the Americas
- Rob Steckley (born 1980), Canadian tennis player

== See also ==
- Steckle
- Stockley (surname)
