= Hinckley, Ohio =

Unincorporated community in Ohio, U.S.

Coordinates: 41°14′18″N 81°44′42″W

Hinckley is an unincorporated community in Medina County, in the U.S. state of Ohio. It is located at the center, and is part, of Hinckley Township.

== History ==
A post office called Hinckley has been in operation since 1825. The community has the name of Judge Samuel Hinckley, a land speculator from Massachusetts. A variant name was Hinckley Center.

== Notable people ==
- Connor Cook, a former NFL and XFL quarterback. Played college football at Michigan State.
- Jim Donovan, the radio voice of the Cleveland Browns and sports director of WKYC-3 in Cleveland
- Avery Jenkins, professional disc golfer and 2009 PDGA World Champion
- Valarie Jenkins, professional disc golfer and four-time PDGA World Champion
- Luke Raley, professional baseball player in the MLB. Currently plays for the Seattle Mariners
- Matt Tifft, a professional NASCAR driver
