= Tom Monroe (disc golfer) =

American disc golfer

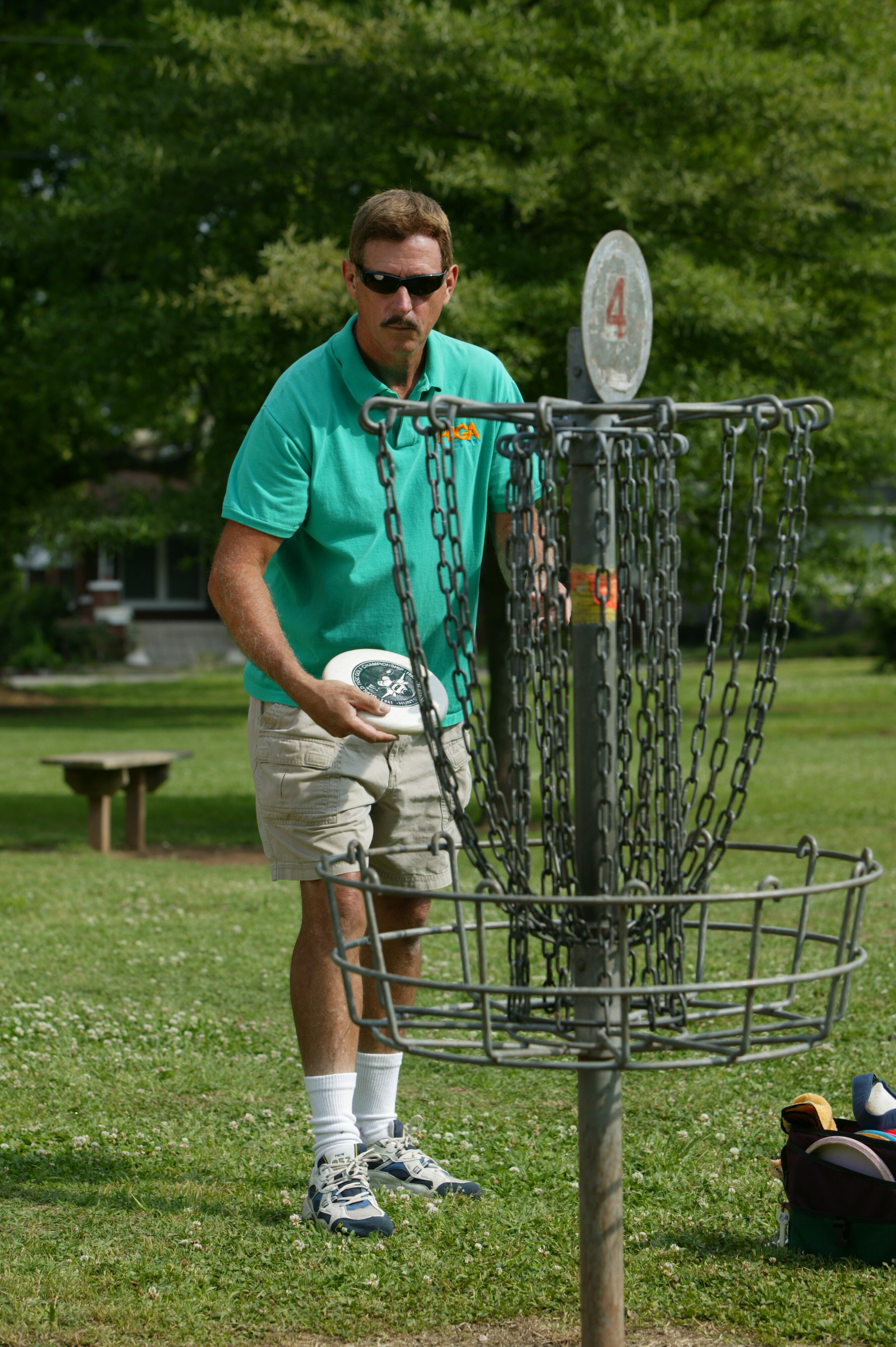
Tom Monroe

Tom Monroe (January 3, 1947 - February 10, 2024) was a champion of virtually all flying disc sports, including ultimate, freestyle, field events and especially disc golf.

In 1973, Tom Monroe was in Atlanta for the summer working in order to earn money to re-enroll in college at the University of North Alabama in Florence. That year Wham-O held nationwide frisbee events called "The Great Frisbee Fly In" in conjunction with radio stations all across America. Tom had played frisbee with his roommate in college and could throw pretty well for playing catch and doing a few tricks, so the time had come to test his skills. Hundreds of people showed up for the competition at Grant Park, with events for distance and accuracy. Tom won both events.

After returning to the University of North Alabama in 1974, Tom wrote a letter to Wham-O. As a senior soon to graduate, he figured they should give him a job. Wham-O referred Tom to the International Frisbee Association. After a few letters back and forth, fate had Tom flying to California for his sister's wedding. Tom's father was in the aerospace industry and had lived in Birmingham then Huntsville before moving to California and lived within 10 minutes of Wham-O's California headquarters. Ed Headrick sent a car to pick him up. During their meeting, Ed told Tom about the World Frisbee Championship they had just run in August. Tom told Ed had he known about it he would have been there. Ed laughed out loud and told Tom "you have to be invited" to which Tom replied "I will be there next year".

After touring the Wham-O plant, Ed took Tom to play disc golf at the new course in Oak Grove. Ed explained that he was working on a design to catch frisbees, since at that time all they had in the ground were metal poles. Tom met and played with Ed's son Kenny and women's World Champ Monika Lou. Ed told Tom of a couple 1974 frisbee world champs, John Kirkland and Victor Malafonte, on tour with the Harlem Globetrotters. They performed a halftime show for the basketball icons and later Tom met them again in Memphis and Atlanta. They had shown Tom how to do the 'nail delay' in Memphis and were amazed that he had mastered the trick only one month later in Atlanta. Later in the Summer of 1975, Tom bested each to win an International Accuracy Title at the Canadian Open Frisbee Championships, in Toronto. Within months, Tom had established himself as a major player and now knew what he wanted to pursue as a profession.

Tom returned to college very excited about frisbee sports and immediately laid out an 18-hole frisbee golf course around the campus at University of North Alabama. He recruited members and formed the Florence Frisbee Team, the first players from the South to venture to such established tournaments as the National Frisbee Tournament in Michigan and the Octad at Rutgers in New Jersey. That year Rutgers produced a grad student player named Dan "Stork" Roddick, his nickname coming from his amazing abilities during ultimate and freestyle play and Dan was also the editor of Flying Disc News magazine that circulated along the East Coast. Wham-O recruited Dan to become the new director of the International Frisbee Association. His first order of business was to establish a network of reliable frisbee players around the country who could organize and run events by driving across America for recruits. Upon his first venture to the South he met with Tom and the Florence Frisbee Team. Afterwards he asked Tom to become the Regional Director for the IFA, giving Tom a job as he started Graduate School. During these first few years of working with the IFA, Tom began performing Frisbee demonstrations, which was another source of income and led to a company car from Wham-O. Tom picked out a brand new, full size customized Dodge van and was then able to do shows all over the country. His new team, Frisbee South, traveled America spreading the joy of disc sports from public schools to college campuses and also did substantial promo work for Wham-O, performing at venues such as Major League Baseball, National Wham-O Promotions NASCAR Races and NBA basketball games.

As part of his position with the IFA, Tom was responsible for starting State Flying Disc Championships and started the first-ever such event in the South in Florence, AL during the fall of 1974 after his return from Wham-O. This was the first ever event including disc golf alongside distance and accuracy field events. Tom managed to help start state tourneys in Mississippi, Florida, Georgia, Tennessee, North Carolina and Kentucky. These tournaments were the seeds for all of organized disc sport to follow in the South.

While living in Huntsville in 1982, Tom helped the nationwide movement to place PDGA control into the hands of players. Ed Headrick realized that this was a good idea and asked Tom to be on the newly formed board of directors. Tom stayed on the PDGA board for ten years and was influential in forming new policy and procedures. During college Tom met Lavone Wolfe and formed a lifelong friendship. Lavone is the founder of the Disc Golf Hall of Fame and was the Co-Tournament Director (along with Bill Wagnon) for the 1993 World Championships. Tom has left his Frisbee Instructor position at UAB and Samford to return to Huntsville and take up the position of Course Pro at Brahan Springs, the course that he and Ed Headrick worked on in 1976. February 22, 2024, Shortly after his death, the course was renamed "The Tom Monroe Course at Brahan Springs" in his honor.

After a sudden illness in February 2023, it was found that Tom had a bowel obstruction. During life-saving surgery, it was discovered that Tom has numerous cancerous tumors in his abdomen, including the one that caused the blockage. Due to complications, Tom required two additional emergency surgeries. His cancer was located in his colon and abdominal area and was not curable, so he started chemo Tuesday the 24th of May hoping to shrink it and maintain a good quality of life. Tom Monroe, PDGA #033, passed from this life on Friday, 10 February 2024, at his home. When asked what he most wants to be remembered for he said “ I always wanted people to remember that I brought a smile to their face”.

== Career highlights ==
- 1973 - Won the Great Frisbee Fly In: Atlanta, GA
- 1974 - Tournament Director, first overall state tourney: Florence, AL
- 1975 - International Accuracy Champion : Toronto | Second Place, Freestyle World Frisbee Championships held in the Rose Bowl : Pasadena, CA
- 1975-1983 - Overall winner State Championships in AL, TN, KY, GA, MS, FL | travels US performing Frisbee shows at special events, public schools, universities, major sporting events such as Atlanta Braves baseball, Atlanta Hawks basketball, World's Fair in Knoxville, TN and for the New Orleans Jazz in the Louisiana Superdome
- 1975-1981 - Attends all World Championships, wins various national titles
- 1976 - Founded Frisbee South professional sports entertainment company
- 1976 - Designed second oldest permanent disc golf course in the world at Brahan Springs Park in Huntsville, AL.
- 1977 - Co-designs KOA disc golf course near Mobile, AL with 'Steady' Ed Headrick | Tournament Director of first PDGA tourney, won 2nd place
- 1979 - Wins Self-Caught Flight World Championships, set 90 yard TRC (throw, run, catch) entered into Guinness World Records until beaten in 1983
- 1983 - Original PDGA board member, served 10 years | Tournament Director of PDGA Worlds : Huntsville, AL | Worlds '83 score of -16 during the Redstone round held record for best major tourney score for 20+ years
- 1993 - Inaugural inductee Disc Golf Hall of Fame | President's Council on Physical Fitness and Sports Award
- 2000 - Guest television appearance on Young America Outdoors aired on FOX network
- 2003 - Ankle fracture from slip off tee box in Atlanta, resulted in 2-year competition hiatus
- 2004 - Founded Alabama Amateur Open
- 2005 - Recovered from ankle fracture
- 2006 - Hired as Flying Disc Sports instructor at Samford University: Birmingham, AL
- 2008 - Hired as Flying Disc Sports instructor at University of Alabama at Birmingham: Birmingham, AL
- 2018 - Inducted into the Huntsville-Madison County Athletic Hall of Fame

== Tournament results ==
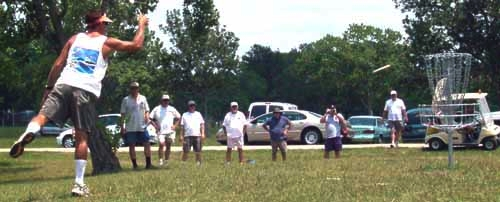
Tom Monroe's 2002 PDGA Worlds winning putt

- 1982 - WFDF Masters : 1st overall
- 1983 - PDGA World Championships, Huntsville, AL : 2nd Open Masters, Redstone -16 round new world record
- 1984 - PDGA World Championships, Rochester, NY : 2nd Masters
- 1985 - World Championships, Sweden : Masters World Champion, disc golf
- 1986 - PDGA World Championships, Charlotte, NC : Open Doubles 1st, partner Gary Augustine
- 1987 - PDGA World Championships, Toronto, ON : 2nd Masters
- 1988 - PDGA World Championships, Cincinnati, OH : 2nd Masters, 1st Doubles, partner Steve Slasor
- 1989 - PDGA World Championships, Waterloo, IA : 2nd Masters, 1st Seniors Doubles, partner Lavone Wolfe
- 1990 - PDGA World Championships, Phoenix, AZ : 2nd Masters
- 1991 - PDGA World Championships, Dayton, OH : 2nd Masters
- 1991 - WFDF Masters, Rochester, NY : 1st overall
- 1992 - PDGA World Championships, Detroit, MI : 1st Grand Masters, 1st Doubles, partner Steve Slasor
- 1993 - PDGA World Championships, Huntsville, AL : 1st Grand Masters, 1st Doubles, partner Mike Conger
- 1994 - PDGA World Championships, Port Arthur, TX : 1st Grand Masters
- 1994 - WFDF Masters, Atlanta, GA : 1st overall Grand Masters
- 1995 - PDGA World Championships, Port Arthur, TX : 2nd Grand Masters, 1st Doubles, partner Rick Voakes
- 1996 - PDGA World Championships, South Bend, IN : 1st Grand Masters
- 1997 - PDGA World Championships, Charlotte, NC : 2nd Grand Masters, 1st Doubles, partner Snapper Pierson
- 1998 - PDGA World Championships, Cincinnati, OH : 1st Doubles, partner Snapper Pierson
- 1999 - PDGA World Championships, Rochester, NY : 1st Grand Masters, 1st Doubles, partner Rick Voakes
- 2000 - PDGA World Championships, Ann Arbor, MI : 1st Grand Masters, 1st Doubles, partner Royce Racinowski
- 2001 - PDGA World Championships, Saint Paul, MN : 2nd Grand Masters, 1st Doubles, partner Snapper Pierson
- 2002 - PDGA World Championships, Houston, TX : 1st Grand Masters, 1st Doubles, partner Rick Voakes

April 9, 2018 Inducted into the Huntsville-Madison County Athletic Hall of Fame. First Frisbee player to "cross over".
