= Highbridge, Wisconsin =

- Unincorporated community
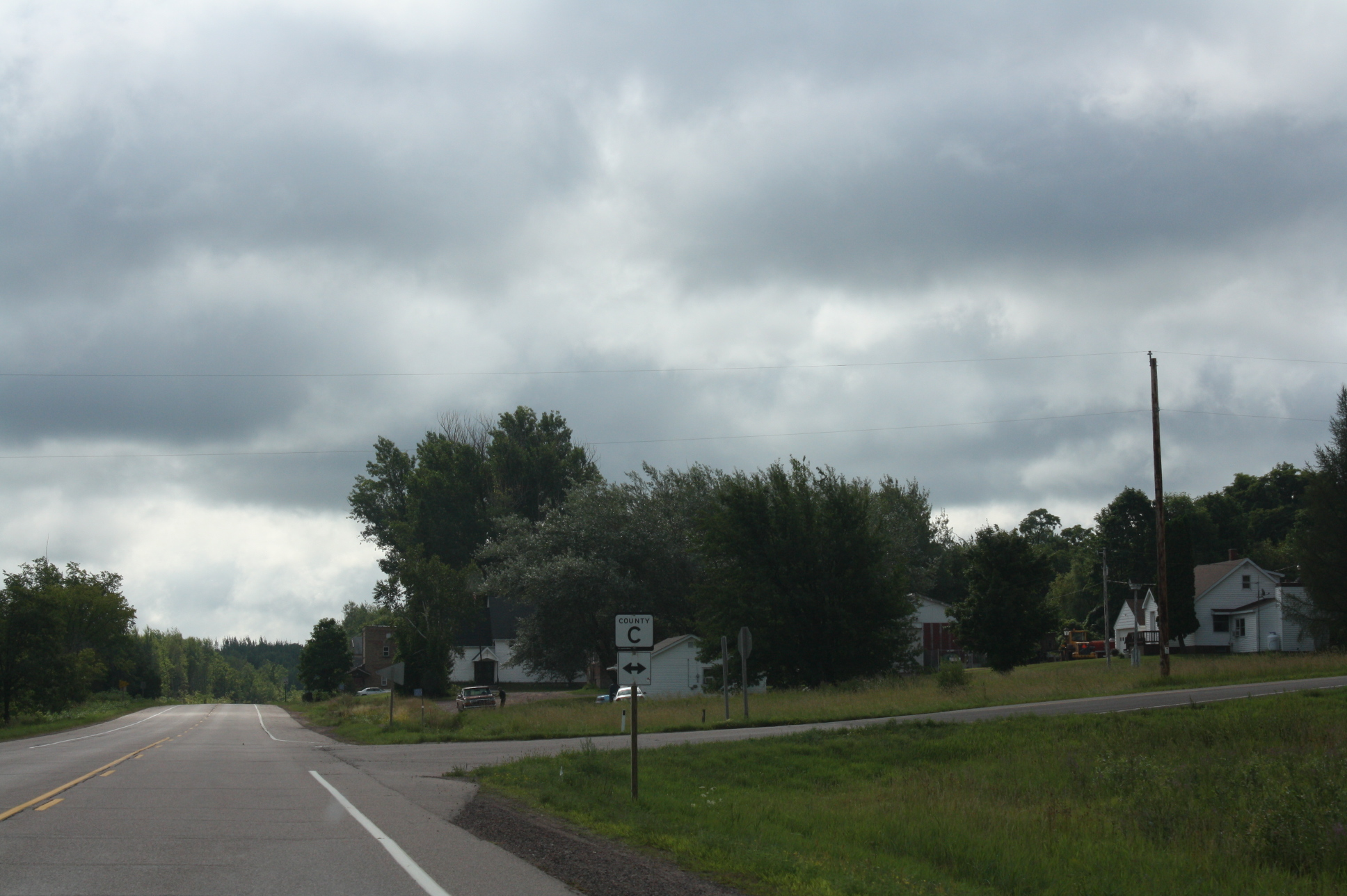
- Looking south at Highbridge

- Location within Wisconsin Location within the United States
- Coordinates: 46°23′20″N 90°44′11″W
- Country: United States
- State: Wisconsin
- County: Ashland
- Town: Ashland
- Elevation: 997 ft (304 m)
- Time zone: UTC-6 (Central (CST))
  - Summer (DST): UTC-5 (CDT)
- ZIP code: 54846
- Area codes: 715 & 534
- GNIS feature ID: 1566371

Highbridge (also spelled High Bridge) is an unincorporated community located in the town of Ashland, Ashland County, Wisconsin, United States. Highbridge is located on Wisconsin Highway 13, 6 miles (9.7 km) northwest of Mellen. Highbridge has a post office with ZIP code 54846. Bus service to the community is provided by Bay Area Rural Transit.

== Climate ==
The climate is described as Humid Continental by the Köppen Climate System, abbreviated as Dfb.

Climate data for Highbridge, Wisconsin
Month	Jan	Feb	Mar	Apr	May	Jun	Jul	Aug	Sep	Oct	Nov	Dec	Year
Mean daily maximum °C (°F)	−6 (22)	−3 (27)	3 (37)	11 (52)	19 (66)	23 (74)	26 (79)	25 (77)	20 (68)	13 (56)	4 (39)	−3 (26)	11 (52)
Mean daily minimum °C (°F)	−18 (0)	−17 (2)	−10 (14)	−2 (28)	4 (39)	9 (49)	12 (54)	11 (52)	7 (44)	1 (34)	−6 (22)	−14 (7)	−2 (29)
Average precipitation mm (inches)	33 (1.3)	25 (1)	43 (1.7)	64 (2.5)	89 (3.5)	100 (4)	100 (4.1)	100 (4)	97 (3.8)	74 (2.9)	58 (2.3)	36 (1.4)	830 (32.5)
Source: Weatherbase

== Images ==
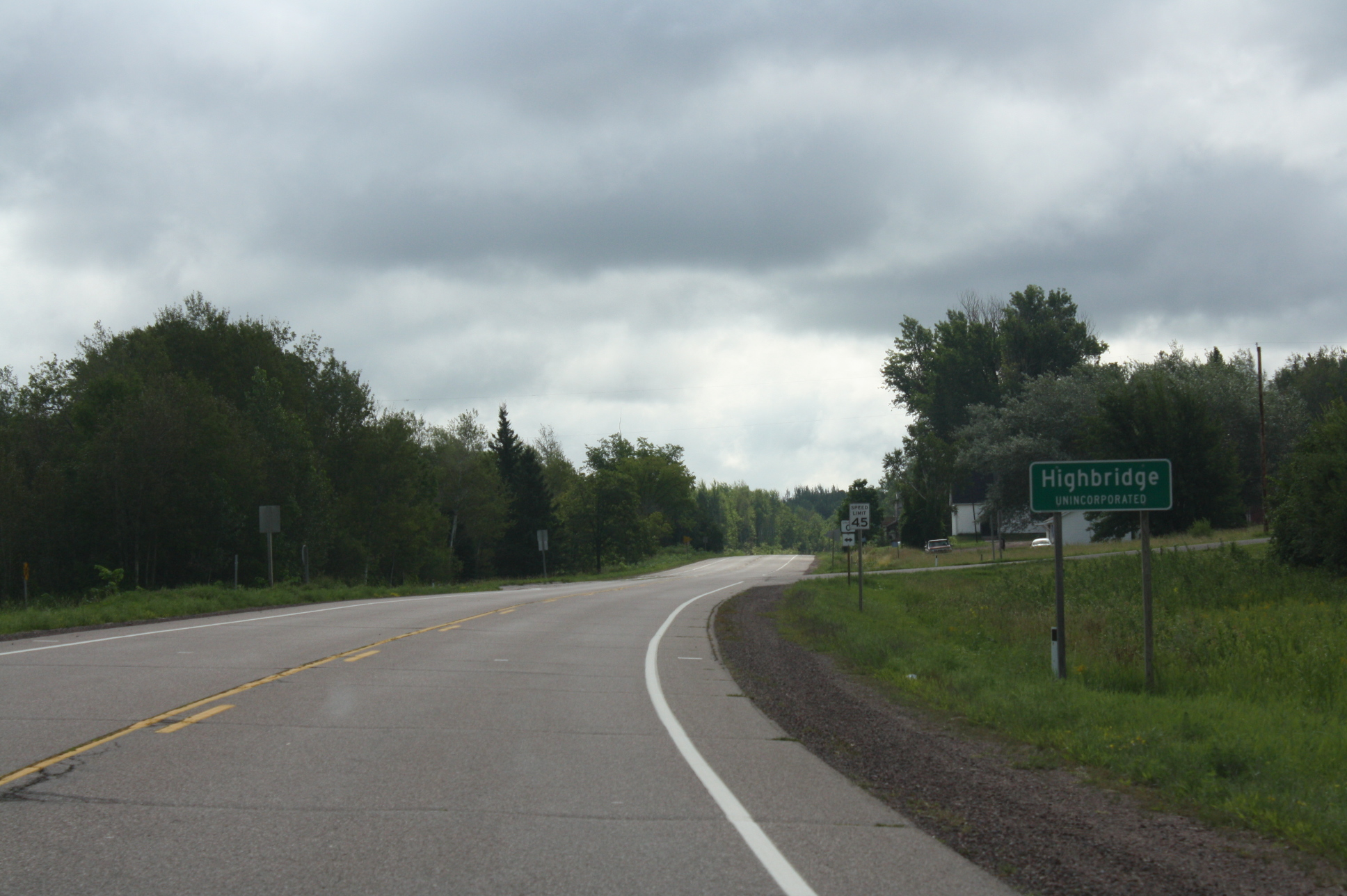
Sign on WIS 13

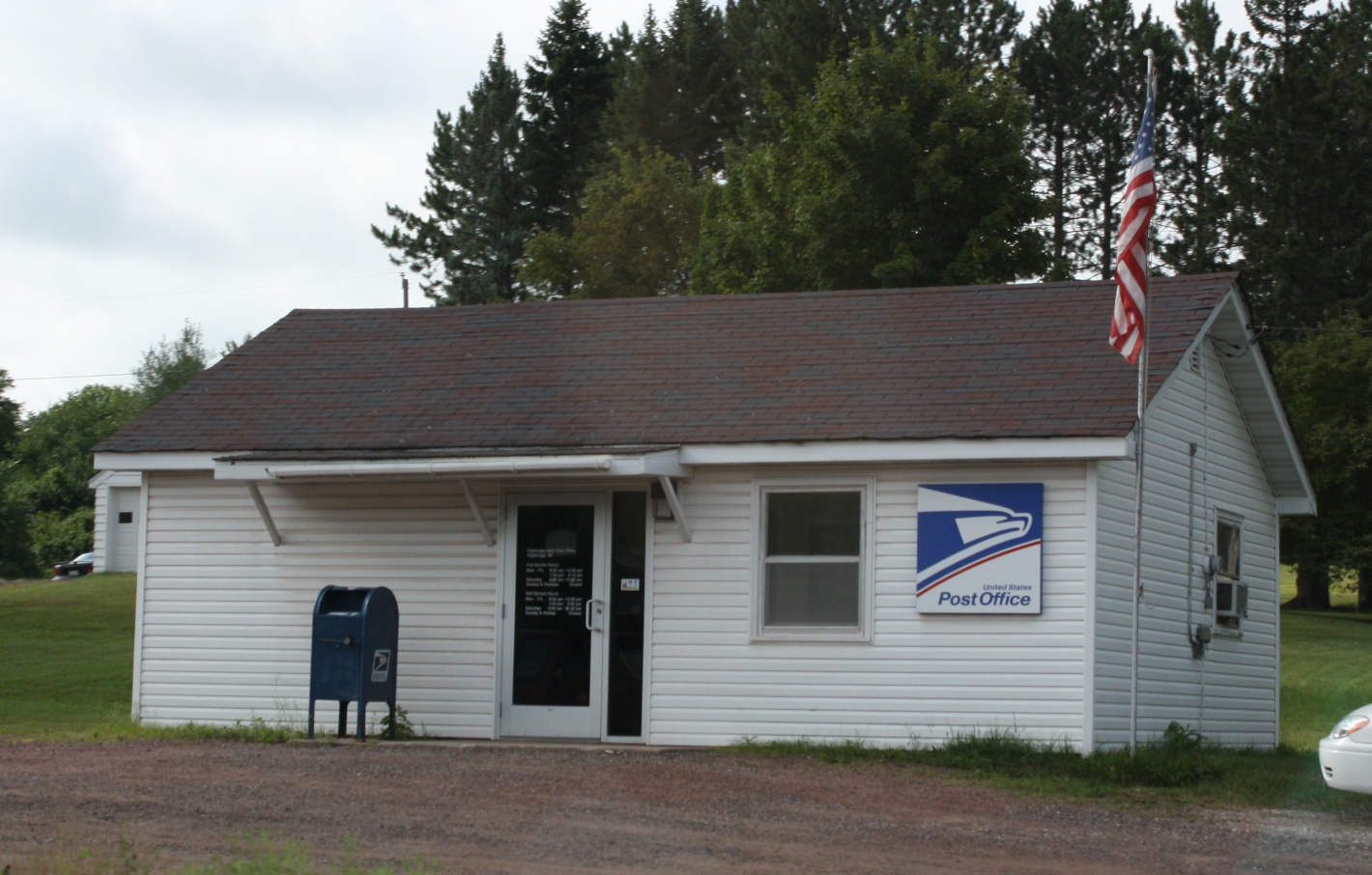
Post office

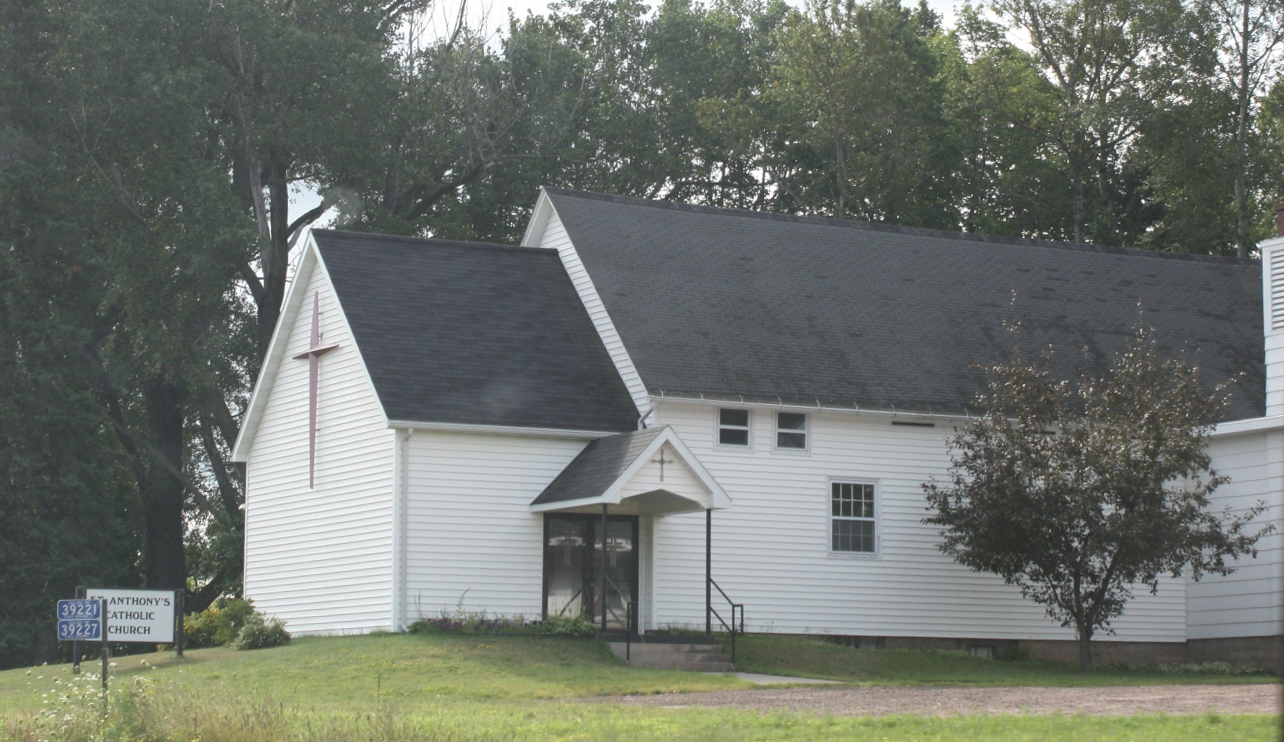
St. Anthony Catholic Church in Highbridge
