= Scott Stokely =

American disc golfer (born 1969)

- Stokely with the Guts National Championship trophy, 2026

Personal information
- Born: August 29, 1969 (age 57) Hollywood, California
- Height: 6 ft 7 in (201 cm)

Sport
- Sport: Disc sports (Frisbee)
- Events: Freestyle, disc golf, double disc court, guts, distance and overall events (TRC, MTA, and accuracy)
- Turned pro: 1986

Scott Stokely is an American professional disc golfer, disc sports (frisbee) teacher, and author. Scott began playing disc golf in 1976 as a junior member of the Oak Grove Gophers at the World's first permanent Disc Golf Course"Oak Grove Disc Golf Course". PDGA Course Directory. in Pasadena, California. Stokely published an instructional book and videos about disc golf throwing techniques in 2001 and the first Disc Golf autobiography "Scott Stokely: Growing Up Disc Golf" in January 2020.Scott Stokely: Growing Up Disc Golf. Independent. 2020. ISBN 165234201X.

== Early life ==
Spending much of his childhood free time at Oak Grove Disc Golf Course gave Scott Stokely the unique opportunity to be mentored by Disc Golf Legends such as: Joe Ursino, Geoff and Johnny Lissaman, Mark Horn, Dan "Stork" Roddick, and Paul Harris. In February 1985, at age 17, Stokely became the youngest player to make the finals at Oak Grove's showcase tournament, the Wintertime Open.

== Professional career ==
Scott Stokely has earned 18 world and national professional titles in major tournaments over the course of his career. He took a break from the sport in 2000 to focus on family. Scott returned to competing in 2015 in the Masters Division. He decided to go back to the Pro Open Division to test himself against the elite throwers of the Disc Golf Pro Tour for the 2022 season. At the 2022 Big Money OTB Tour Skins Match at Eagles Crossing, Stokely hit what is regarded as one of the most notable sidearm shots in the sport's history. The documentary Not Just a Shot: A Disc Golf Story, directed by Kendrew Mueller, follows his return to the pro tour and that victory. In 2023 he traveled to Europe to compete on the DGPT EuroTour. In 2026, Stokely won the Virginia State Overall title and, with Team Whiskey Disc, the Guts National Championship.

Stokely with the Virginia State Overall trophy, 2026

In 2024, Stokely was inducted into the Disc Golf Hall of Fame and the Southern California Disc Sports Hall of Fame.

Stokely started the Blue Power autism awareness campaign in 2014, which later expanded to serve people with a range of physical and developmental disabilities; by 2018 he had hosted adaptive disc golf clinics in 278 cities across 46 states. "I call it adaptive disc golf," Stokely said in 2018. "Every player that comes out has a different cognitive ability or level. And so what I do is adapt the game of disc golf to specifically what they can." In 2021, he taught adaptive disc golf to around 25 participants from Hetlinger Developmental Services during the Dynamic Discs Open in Emporia, Kansas.

=== World distance records ===
At the 1987 WFDF V Championships, Scott set a Juniors’ distance record of 155.83 meters. In 1995 Stokely threw a Discraft X-clone 200.01 meters, beating the previous Guinness World Records distance record set in 1993 by Niclas Bergehamm. Stokely broke his own record in 1998 throwing a 211.32 meter backhand with a Discraft XL. In 2001, Stokely also set a record for the longest throw sidearm (568 ft) which was not published. He is the only player in history to hold both the backhand and sidearm world distance records.

== Notable achievements and event timeline ==
- 1997 PDGA World Championships - 2nd Place
- 1998 PDGA World Championships - 2nd Place
