= Stockley, Devon =

Hamlet in Devon, England

Coordinates: 50°44′30″N 3°58′10″W

Stockley is a hamlet on the eastern outskirts of Okehampton, in Devon, England.

It lies just north of the A30.
