= Stockley (surname) =

Stockley is a surname. Notable people with the surname include:

- Charles C. Stockley (1819–1901), American politician
- Cynthia Stockley (1873–1936), South African writer
- Ena Stockley (1906–1989), New Zealand swimmer
- Henry Stockley (1892–1982), English artist
- Jayden Stockley (born 1993), English footballer
- Mary Stockley, English actress
- Miriam Stockley (born 1962), British singer
- Sam Stockley (born 1977), English footballer
- Tom Stockley (1936–2000), American writer
- Tony Stockley (1940–1991), English cricketer
- William Stockley (1859–1943), Irish politician
- William Stockley (musician) (1830–1919), English musician
