= Piciw Minikanan Bay =

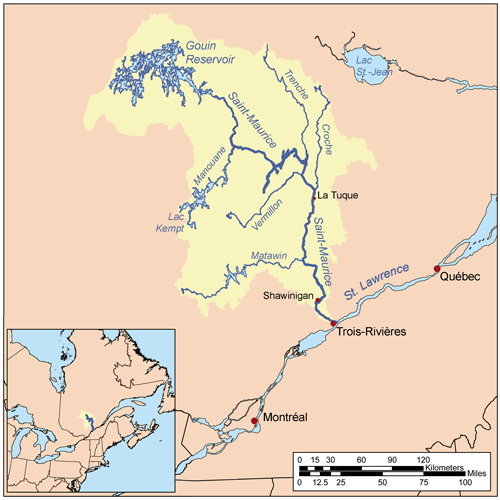
- Watershed of Saint-Maurice River

- Location within Quebec
- Location: La Tuque
- Coordinates: 48°25′14″N 75°26′43″W
- Type: Lake of dam
- Primary inflows: Outlet of unidentified lake, derivation canal coming from lake of the Poet (Mégiscane River)
- Primary outflows: Adolphe-Poisson Bay (linked to Du Mâle Lake (Gouin Reservoir))
- Basin countries: Canada
- Max. length: 2.0 kilometres (1.2 mi)
- Max. width: 0.3 kilometres (0.19 mi)
- Surface elevation: 402 metres (1,319 ft)

Piciw Minikanan Bay is a body of freshwater located in the western part of Gouin Reservoir, in the territory of the town of La Tuque, in the administrative area of the Mauricie, in the province of Quebec, in Canada.

This lake extends entirely in the canton of Poisson.

Recreotourism activities are the main economic activity of the sector. Forestry comes second. Recreational boating is particularly popular on this water, especially for sport fishing.

The Piciw Minikanan Bay hydrographic slope is served on the east side by the R1009 forest road (which also serves the entire western side of the Gouin Reservoir and the Berthelot River).

The surface of Piciw Minikanan Bay is usually frozen from mid-November to the end of April, however, safe ice circulation is generally from early December to late March. Water management at the Gouin Dam can lead to significant variations in the water level, particularly at the end of the winter when the water is lowered. The water level of this bay equilibrates with that of the Gouin Reservoir.

== Geography ==
Before the completion of the construction of the La Loutre Dam in 1916, creating the Gouin Reservoir, Piciw Minikanan Bay had a smaller dimension. After the second raising of the waters in 1946 with the development of the Gouin Dam, Piciw Minikanan Bay developed into its current form.

The main hydrographic slopes near Piciw Minikanan Bay are:

- north side: Rienteau Lake, Saveney Lake, Adolphe-Poisson Bay, Hanotaux Bay, Berthelot River (Mégiscane River), Plamondon Bay (Gouin Reservoir), Pascagama River;
- east side: Adolphe-Poisson Bay, Mattawa Bay, Du Mâle Lake (Gouin Reservoir), Saraana Bay, Bureau Lake (Gouin Reservoir);
- south side: Bignell Creek, Mégiscane River, Provancher Creek, Flapjack River;
- West side: Mégiscane River, Lake of the Poet (Mégiscane River), Brécourt Lake, Bernier Lake.

With a length of 2.0 kilometres (1.2 mi), Piciw Minikanan Bay stretches to the northeast. This bay has a strategic role because it receives the waters of the diversion channel from the Lake of the Poet (Mégiscane River). This canal was designed to divert water from the Suzie River and upper part of Mégiscane River to the Gouin Reservoir which is at the head of the Saint-Maurice River.

“Piciw Minikanan Bay” is bounded on the east by a peninsula stretching northward on 2.3 kilometres (1.4 mi), which forms the west shore of the Adolphe-Poisson Bay. In its Northern part, this bay catches the water (coming from West) of a creek where the "digue de la Baie-Poisson-Sud" was built at 0.7 kilometres (0.43 mi) upstream.

The mouth of Piciw Minikanan Bay is located northeast of the lake at:

- 9.4 kilometres (5.8 mi) south-west of the mouth of the Adolphe-Poisson Bay (confluence with the Du Mâle Lake (Gouin Reservoir));
- 23.6 kilometres (14.7 mi) north of the exit of the Kaopatinak Pass which separates the Du Mâle Lake (Gouin Reservoir) in two;
- 43.6 kilometres (27.1 mi) south-west of the village center of Obedjiwan, Quebec which is located on a peninsula on the north shore of Gouin Reservoir;
- 98.8 kilometres (61.4 mi) west of Gouin Dam;
- 135.7 kilometres (84.3 mi) west of the village center of Wemotaci, Quebec (north shore of the Saint-Maurice River);
- 227 kilometres (141 mi) north-west of downtown La Tuque;
- 318 kilometres (198 mi) northwest of the mouth of the Saint-Maurice River (confluence with the St. Lawrence River at Trois-Rivières).

From the mouth of “Piciw Minikanan Bay”, the current flows over 124.7 kilometres (77.5 mi) to Gouin Dam, according to the following segments:

- 9.8 kilometres (6.1 mi) north-east across the Adolphe-Poisson Bay to its mouth;
- 37.3 kilometres (23.2 mi) to the North crossing the Du Mâle Lake (Gouin Reservoir), then to the East crossing the Bourgeois Lake (Gouin Reservoir) and the Toussaint Lake to the south of the village of Obedjiwan, Quebec;
- 81.9 kilometres (50.9 mi) to the east, crossing in particular Marmette Lake, then to the South-East crossing notably Brochu Lake, then across the Kikendatch Bay until Gouin Dam.
From this dam, the current flows along the Saint-Maurice River to Trois-Rivières where it flows onto the North Shore of the St. Lawrence River.

== Toponymy ==
"Piciw Minikanan" is of aboriginal origin.

The French toponym "Baie Piciw Minikanan" was formalized on September 3, 1981, by the Commission de toponymie du Québec.

== See also ==
- Saint-Maurice River, a watercourse
- Gouin Reservoir, a body of water
- Du Mâle Lake (Gouin Reservoir), a body of water
- Adolphe-Poisson Bay, a body of water
- Lake of the Poète (Mégiscane River), a body of water
- La Tuque, a city
- List of lakes in Canada
