= Provancher Creek =

Location
- Country: Canada
- Province: Quebec
- Region: Mauricie

Physical characteristics
- Source: Provancher Lake
  - location: La Tuque (Provancher Township), Mauricie, Quebec
  - coordinates: 48°14′38″N 75°30′34″W
  - elevation: 413 m (1,355 ft)
- Mouth: Mégiscane River
  - location: La Tuque (Provancher Township), Mauricie, Quebec
  - coordinates: 48°20′25″N 75°30′40″W
  - elevation: 406 m (1,332 ft)
- Length: 17.5 km (10.9 mi)

Provancher Creek (French: “Ruisseau Provancher”) is a tributary of the upper part of the Mégiscane River located to the west of Gouin Reservoir, flowing entirely into forest area in the town of La Tuque, in the administrative region of Mauricie, in Quebec, in Canada.

The "Provancher Creek" flows in the Provancher and Poisson townships. Forestry is the main economic activity of this valley; recreational tourism activities, second.

The forested road R1009 (East-West) intersects and cuts the lower Provancher Creek Valley; this road is connected in turn to the East with the forest road R1009 (direction North-South) which serves the western part of the Gouin reservoir.

The surface of "Provancher Creek" is usually frozen from mid-November to late April, however, safe ice circulation is generally from early December to late March.

== Geography ==
The hydrographic slopes adjacent to Provancher Creek are:

- north side: Mégiscane River, Du Poète Lake (Mégiscane River), Lac de la Tête;
- east side: Bignell Creek, Flapjack River, Bureau Lake (Gouin Reservoir) (South Bay), Tessier Lake (Gouin Reservoir);
- south side: Flapjack River, Tamarac River, Provancher Lake;
- west side: Mégiscane River, Suzie River.

"Provancher Creek" originates at the mouth of Provancher Lake (length: 3.6 kilometres (2.2 mi); altitude: 413 metres (1,355 ft)). The mouth of this head lake is located in Provancher Township, east of Médora and Chassigne lakes. This mouth is at:

- 10.8 kilometres (6.7 mi) south of the mouth of Provancher Creek (confluence with the Mégiscane River);
- 17.6 kilometres (10.9 mi) South of Du Poète Lake (Mégiscane River);
- 28.8 kilometres (17.9 mi) south-west of the mouth of the Adolphe-Poisson Bay;
- 62 kilometres (39 mi) south-west of the village center of Obedjiwan, Quebec (located on a peninsula on the north shore of Gouin Reservoir);
- 105 kilometres (65 mi) south-west of the Gouin Dam erected at the mouth of the Gouin Reservoir (confluence with the Saint-Maurice River).

From the mouth of the head lake, the course of the "Provancher Creek" flows entirely in the forest zone over 17.5 kilometres (10.9 mi) mainly in Provancher Township, according to the following segments:

- 1.8 kilometres (1.1 mi) north, to the outlet (coming from the west) of an unidentified lake;
- 7.6 kilometres (4.7 mi) to the north, forming many small coils, to the discharge (from the southeast) of an unidentified lake;
- 5.5 kilometres (3.4 mi) north, up to a bend in the river;
- 2.6 kilometres (1.6 mi) westward, forming a curve towards the North which passes in the canton of Poisson, to return in the canton of Provancher, until the mouth of the river.

The mouth of the "Provancher Creek" merges with the "Rat Lake Water" which is crossed to the North by the Mégiscane River. This mouth is located at:

- 6.8 kilometres (4.2 mi) south of Du Poète Lake (Mégiscane River);
- 19.9 kilometres (12.4 mi) south-west of the mouth of the Adolphe-Poisson Bay;
- 54.8 kilometres (34.1 mi) south-west of the village center of Obedjiwan, Quebec which is located on a peninsula on the north shore of Gouin Reservoir;
- 104.6 kilometres (65.0 mi) south-west of Gouin Dam;
- 138 kilometres (86 mi) west of the village center of Wemotaci, Quebec (north shore of the Saint-Maurice River);
- 226 kilometres (140 mi) northwest of downtown La Tuque.

From the mouth of the Provancher Creek, the current flows over 144.95 kilometres (90.07 mi) to Gouin Dam, according to the following segments:

- 8.0 kilometres (5.0 mi) north following the course of the Mégiscane River to Du Poète Lake (Mégiscane River);
- 3.2 kilometres (2.0 mi) north-east across the Du Poète Lake (Mégiscane River) (length: 4.0 kilometres (2.5 mi); altitude: 406 kilometres (252 mi)) to its artificial mouth (confluence with the reel leading to the Gouin Reservoir);
- 14.25 kilometres (8.85 mi) southeasterly by taking the two segments of the diversion channel, crossing the Piciw Minikanan Bay and the Adolphe-Poisson Bay, to its mouth;
- 37.6 kilometres (23.4 mi) to the northeast crossing the Du Mâle Lake (Gouin Reservoir), then to the east crossing the Bourgeois Lake (Gouin Reservoir) and the Toussaint Lake to the south of the village of Obedjiwan, Quebec;
- 81.9 kilometres (50.9 mi) to the East, crossing the Marmette Lake, then to the South-East crossing in particular the Brochu Lake then to the East crossing the Kikendatch Bay until Gouin Dam.

From this dam, the current flows along the Saint-Maurice River to Trois-Rivières.

== Toponymy ==
The terms "Provencher" and its derivative "Provancher" are family names of French origin.

The French toponym "ruisseau Provancher" was formalized on December 5, 1968 at the Commission de toponymie du Québec, e.g. at the creation of this commission.

== See also ==
- Saint-Maurice River, a watercourse
- Gouin Reservoir, a water body
- Du Mâle Lake (Gouin Reservoir), a water body
- Adolphe-Poisson Bay, a water body
- Mégiscane River, a water body
- Du Poète Lake (Mégiscane River), a water body
- La Tuque, a territory equivalent to a RCM
- List of rivers of Quebec
