= De la Rencontre Creek =

Location
- Country: Canada
- Region: Mauricie

Physical characteristics
- Source: Unidentified Lake
  - location: La Tuque (Perrier Township), Mauricie, Quebec
  - coordinates: 48°51′36″N 75°06′18″W
  - elevation: 495 m (1,624 ft)
- Mouth: Du Mâle Lake (Gouin Reservoir)
  - location: Mauricie, Quebec
  - coordinates: 48°40′45″N 75°03′05″W
  - elevation: 402 m (1,319 ft)
- Length: 49.2 km (30.6 mi)

Basin features
- Tributaries
  - left: (upstream); Outlet of Lake Larouche; outlet of lake Masko Ponapanan; outlet of Lake Atikamekwranan.

The De la Rencontre Creek is a tributary of the Du Mâle Lake located in the western part of the Gouin Reservoir, flowing entirely into forest area in the town of La Tuque, in the administrative region of Mauricie, Quebec, Canada.

The "De la Rencontre Creek" flows successively into the cantons of Perrier, Lagacé, Lacasse and Toussaint. Forestry is the main economic activity of this valley; recreational tourism activities, second.

The route R2046 serves the lower eastern portion of the "De la Rencontre Creek" valley and Larouche Lake; that road is in turn eastbound to the 202 Forest Road, which runs south to serve the peninsula where the village of Obedjiwan, Quebec is located.

The surface of the "De la Rencontre Creek" is usually frozen from mid-November to the end of April; however, safe ice circulation is generally from early December to the end of March.

== Geography ==
The hydrographic slopes adjacent to the "De la Rencontre Creek" are:

- north side: Marceau Lake, Lagacé Lake, Pascagama River;
- east side: Larouche Lake, Du Mâle Lake, Toussaint Lake, Gouin Reservoir, Marmette Lake;
- south side: Du Mâle Lake, Bureau Lake (Gouin Reservoir), Mattawa Bay, Saraana Bay;
- west side: Plamondon Creek (Gouin Reservoir), Piponisiw River, Berthelot River, Pascagama River, Mégiscane River.

The "De la Rencontre Creek" originates at the mouth of an unidentified lake (length: 0.4 kilometres (0.25 mi); altitude: 495 metres (1,624 ft)) surrounded by mountains. The mouth of this lake is located in the eastern part of the township of Perrier, a few tens of meters from the eastern limit of the township of Lagacé. This mouth is at:

- 4.5 kilometres (2.8 mi) south of Mount Amiskotci (altitude: 480 metres (1,570 ft));
- 6.9 kilometres (4.3 mi) south-east of the Pascagama River;
- 20.4 kilometres (12.7 mi) north-west of the mouth of the "ruisseau de la Rencontre" (confluence with the Du Mâle Lake);
- 25.6 kilometres (15.9 mi) northwest of the village center of Obedjiwan, Quebec (located on a peninsula on the north shore of Gouin Reservoir);
- 93.2 kilometres (57.9 mi) northwest of the Gouin Dam erected at the mouth of the Gouin Reservoir (confluence with the Saint-Maurice River).

From the mouth of the head lake, the course of the "De la Rencontre Creek" flows entirely in forest zone on 49.2 kilometres (30.6 mi) according to the following segments:

Upper part of the course of the "De la Rencontre Creek" (segment of 28.3 kilometres (17.6 mi))

- 7.1 kilometres (4.4 mi) south-west, in Lagacé township, crossing an unidentified lake (length: 2.9 kilometres (1.8 mi); altitude: 445 metres (1,460 ft)) formed by a widening of the river, to its mouth;
- 5.3 kilometres (3.3 mi) to the southwest, including crossing an unidentified lake (length: 1.5 kilometres (0.93 mi); altitude: 440 metres (1,440 ft)), up to at its mouth;
- 6.2 kilometres (3.9 mi), first to the southwest, then to 3.9 kilometres (2.4 mi) to the east, first crossing a first unidentified lake (length: 1.0 kilometre (0.62 mi);

altitude: 439 metres (1,440 ft)), then Lake Kanicotcekohotek (length: 1.2 kilometres (0.75 mi); altitude: 439 metres (1,440 ft)), to the mouth of this last;

- 3.9 kilometres (2.4 mi) easterly forming a curve to the south to the west bank of "De la Rencontre Lake";
- 5.8 kilometres (3.6 mi) south-east crossing the "De la Rencontre Lake" (length: 11.1 kilometres (6.9 mi); altitude: 421 metres (1,381 ft)) which overlaps the townships of Lagacé and Lacasse;

Lower part of the course of the "De la Rencontre Creek" (segment of 20.9 kilometres (13.0 mi))

- 1.1 kilometres (0.68 mi) easterly to the western limit of the township of Toussaint;
- 4.8 kilometres (3.0 mi) eastward in the township of Toussaint, in particular crossing Mikohocoranan Lake at 3.6 kilometres (2.2 mi) (altitude: 410 metres (1,350 ft)) up to at its mouth;
- 1.2 kilometres (0.75 mi) northeasterly across the boundary of the townships of Toussaint and Perrier, to the outlet (coming from the North) of Larouche Lake;
- 7.8 kilometres (4.8 mi) towards the south-east, returning to the canton of Toussaint, then the south, crossing an unidentified lake (length: 3.5 kilometres (2.2 mi); altitude: 402 metres (1,319 ft)) to its mouth;
- 2.5 kilometres (1.6 mi) southwesterly, crossing an unidentified lake (length: 3.0 kilometres (1.9 mi));

altitude: 402 metres (1,319 ft)) to its mouth;

- 2.2 kilometres (1.4 mi) southerly, crossing Lake Natow (length: 4.0 kilometres (2.5 mi); altitude: 402 metres (1,319 ft)) to its mouth;
- 1.3 kilometres (0.81 mi) south to the mouth of the river.

The mouth of the "De la Rencontre Creek" is located at:

- 8.9 kilometres (5.5 mi) west of the village center of Obedjiwan, Quebec which is located on a peninsula on the north shore of Gouin Reservoir;
- 78 kilometres (48 mi) west of Gouin Dam;
- 124 kilometres (77 mi) northwest of the village center of Wemotaci, Quebec (north shore of the Saint-Maurice River);
- 214 kilometres (133 mi) north-west of downtown La Tuque.

The mouth of the "De la Rencontre Creek" is located on the north shore of the Du Mâle Lake. From there, the current flows over 91.5 kilometres (56.9 mi) until Gouin Dam, according to the following segments:

- 9.6 kilometres (6.0 mi) east through the northern part of Du Mâle Lake, Aiapew Bay and Kanatakompeak Bay to the south of Obedjiwan, Quebec;
- 81.9 kilometres (50.9 mi) to the East, crossing the Marmette Lake, then to the South-East crossing in particular the Brochu Lake then to the East crossing the Kikendatch Bay until Gouin Dam.

From this dam, the current flows along the Saint-Maurice River to Trois-Rivières.

== Toponymy ==
The toponym "De la Rencontre Creek" was formalized on December 5, 1968 at the Commission de toponymie du Québec, when it was created.

== See also ==
- Saint-Maurice River, a watercourse
- Gouin Reservoir, a water body
- Du Mâle Lake, a water body
- La Tuque, a territory equivalent to a RCM
- List of rivers of Quebec
