= Adolphe-Poisson Bay =

Freshwater body in Quebec, Canada

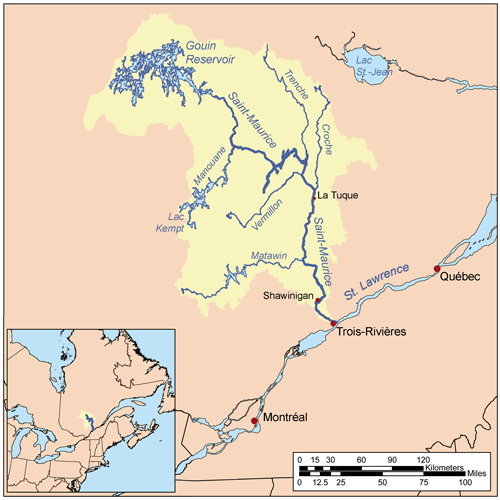
- Watershed of Saint-Maurice River

- Location within Quebec
- Location: La Tuque
- Coordinates: 48°27′02″N 75°24′14″W
- Type: Baie of dam
- Primary inflows: (clockwise); Bignell Creek; outlet (coming from South) of a set of unidentified lakes; canal coming from lake of the Poète via the Piciw Minikanan Bay; outlet of Saveney Lake.
- Primary outflows: Hanotaux Bay, Du Mâle Lake
- Basin countries: Canada
- Max. length: 15.2 kilometres (9.4 mi)
- Max. width: 3.2 kilometres (2.0 mi)
- Surface elevation: 402 metres (1,319 ft)

The Adolphe-Poisson Bay is a freshwater body located south of the southwestern part of the Gouin Reservoir, in the territory of the town of La Tuque, in the administrative region of Mauricie, in the province of Quebec, in Canada.

This lake extends almost entirely in Poisson Township (southern part), except for the strait passing to the northeast of the large island blocking the mouth of the bay which is situated in the canton of Hanotaux.

Recreotourism activities are the main economic activity of the sector. Forestry comes second.

The Forest Road R1009 passes on the west side of Adolphe-Poisson Bay and also serves the lower Flapjack River, passing through the northern part of Bignell Creek and the southern part of the Bureau Lake (Gouin Reservoir). This R1009 road joins the Southeast route 404 which serves the northern part of the Canadian National Railway.

The surface of Adolphe-Poisson Bay is usually frozen from mid-November to the end of April, however, safe ice circulation is generally from early December to late March.

== Geography ==
The slope of Adolphe-Poisson Bay is located at the western limit of the hydrographic slope of Gouin Reservoir. The main hydrographic slopes near Adolphe-Poisson Bay are:
- north side: Saveney Lake, Gouin Reservoir, Du Mâle Lake, Hanotaux Bay, Plamondon Creek;
- east side: Mattawa Bay, Saraana Bay, Bureau Lake (Gouin Reservoir) (South Bay), Oskélanéo River;
- south side: Bignell Creek, Flapjack River, Tamarac River (Gatineau River), Clova River;
- west side: Lake of the Poète, Mégiscane River, Brécourt Lake, Suzie River, Pascagama Lake.

Of a length of 15.2 kilometres (9.4 mi), the Adolphe-Poisson Bay is made along the length (North-South direction). The current bypasses by South on 5.0 kilometres (3.1 mi) and by North on 6.1 kilometres (3.8 mi), an island (length: 5.8 kilometres (3.6 mi)) which bars the mouth of the bay. On the north side of this island, the waters of Adolphe-Poisson Bay mix with the waters of Hanotaux Bay; then the current flows south-east of Du Mâle Lake.

Adolphe-Poisson Bay is mainly fed by Saveney Lake (coming from North), by Bignell Creek which empties into a bay in the south of the lake, and by the Lake of the Poète via Piciw Minikanan Bay; the dam at the mouth of this lake allows the waters of the Suzie River and the upper part of the Mégiscane River to be diverted to the Gouin Reservoir via Adolphe-Poisson Bay.

The mouth of Adolphe-Poisson Bay is located northeast of:

- 12.3 kilometres (7.6 mi) north-east of the mouth of the canal from Lake of the Poète;
- 11.3 kilometres (7.0 mi) northeast of the mouth of Bignell Creek;
- 35.3 kilometres (21.9 mi) south-west of the village center of Obedjiwan, Quebec which is located on a peninsula on the north shore of Gouin Reservoir;
- 92.6 kilometres (57.5 mi) south-west of Gouin Dam;
- 131.7 kilometres (81.8 mi) northwest of the village center of Wemotaci, Quebec (north shore of the Saint-Maurice River);
- 223 kilometres (139 mi) north-west of downtown La Tuque;
- 317 kilometres (197 mi) northwest of the mouth of the Saint-Maurice River (confluence with the St. Lawrence River at Trois-Rivières).

From the mouth of Adolphe-Poisson Bay (located southeast of the large island at the mouth of the bay), the current flows over 119.2 kilometres (74.1 mi) until Gouin Dam, according to the following segments:

- 37.3 kilometres (23.2 mi) northeasterly across the western part of the Gouin Reservoir including the Du Mâle Lake to the south of the village of Obedjiwan, Quebec;
- 81.9 kilometres (50.9 mi) to the East, crossing the Marmette Lake, then to the South-East crossing in particular the Brochu Lake then to the East crossing the Kikendatch Bay until Gouin Dam.
From this dam, the current flows along the Saint-Maurice River to Trois-Rivières.

== Toponymy ==
This hydronym evokes the work of life of Adolphe Poisson (1849-1922), born and baptized under the names of "Modeste-Jules-Adolphe", in Gentilly, Quebec; today, this town is in the city of Bécancour). Poisson was admitted to the Quebec Bar in 1873. Monseigneur Camille Roy (1940) writes that Poisson was "an official at Arthabaska, (now an area of the city of Victoriaville) where since 1874 he has been a member of use of receiver at registration...". Poisson publishes poems and tales in various newspapers and publishes four collections of French poetry:

- "Chants canadiens à l'occasion du 24 juin 1880" (English: "Canadian songs on the occasion of June 24, 1880") (1880);
- "Heures perdues" (English: "Hours lost") (1894);
- "Sous les pins" (English: "Under the Pines") (1902);
- "Chants du soir" (English: "Evening Songs") (1917).

A commemorative plaque was installed in Victoriaville in his honor.

The toponym "Baie Adolphe-Poisson" was formalized on March 10, 1970, by the Commission de toponymie du Québec, when it was created.

== See also ==
- Saint-Maurice River, a watercourse
- Gouin Reservoir, a body of water
- Kikendatch Bay, a body of water
- Brochu Lake, a body of water
- McSeeney Lake, a body of water
- Marmette Lake, a body of water
- Du Mâle Lake, a body of water
- Lake of the Poète, a body of water
- Saveney Lake, a body of water
- Mégiscane River, a watercourse
- Suzie River, a watercourse
- Piciw Minikanan Bay, a body of water
- Bignell Creek, a watercourse
- La Tuque, a city
- List of lakes in Canada
