= Saveney Lake =

Simard Lake
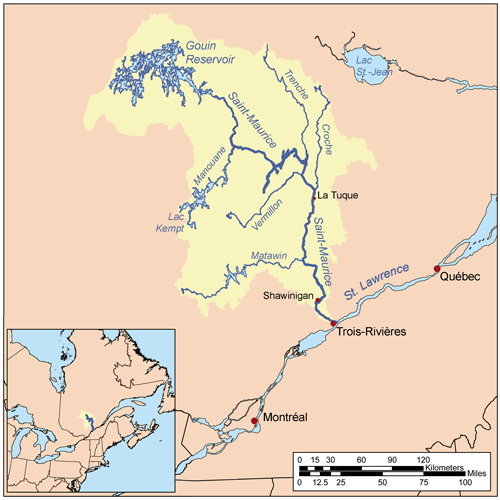
- Watershed of Saint-Maurice River

- Location within Quebec
- Location: La Tuque
- Coordinates: 48°37′43″N 75°010′38″W
- Type: Lake of dam
- Primary inflows: Piponisiw River
- Primary outflows: Miller Lake (Gouin Reservoir) (a tributary of Du Mâle Lake (Gouin Reservoir)
- Basin countries: Canada
- Max. length: 4.2 kilometres (2.6 mi)
- Max. width: 2.0 kilometres (1.2 mi)
- Surface elevation: 402 metres (1,319 ft)

The Saveney Lake is a freshwater body attached to the Adolphe-Poisson Bay, located in the western part of the Gouin Reservoir, in the territory of the City of La Tuque, in the administrative region of Mauricie, in the province of Quebec, in Canada. This lake extends in the cantons of Hanotaux and Poisson.

Hydropower is the main economic activity of the sector. Forestry and recreational tourism activities, second.

The western side of the Saveney Lake and Adolphe-Poisson Bay watersheds are served by the R1009 forest road (North-South direction). This road also serves the entire western part of the Gouin Reservoir.

The surface of Saveney Lake is usually frozen from mid-November to the end of April, however, safe ice circulation is generally from early December to late March.

== Geography ==
The main hydrographic slopes near Lake Saveney are:
- north side: Berthelot River, Pascagama River;
- east side: Adolphe-Poisson Bay, Hanotaux Bay, Saraana Bay, Du Mâle Lake (Gouin Reservoir);
- south side: Mattawa Bay, Adolphe-Poisson Bay, Bignell Creek, Flapjack River;
- west side: De La Tête Lake, Mégiscane River, Kekek River, Serpent River (Mégiscane River).

Lake Saveney, which is about 5.2 kilometres (3.2 mi) long, collects water from the outlet of small unidentified lakes at the bottom of a small bay in its western part. Saveney Lake has a northern bay (length: 2.6 kilometres (1.6 mi), narrow in shape) that extends in parallel and on the west side of the northern part of Hanotaux Bay. A second bay stretches over (length: 0.9 kilometres (0.56 mi) north-east, towards the Hanotaux Bay. A third bay stretches over 0.9 kilometres (0.56 mi) to the south of the main part of the lake A fourth bay stretches on (length: 1.2 kilometres (0.75 mi) towards the south, constitutes the emissary.

The natural mouth of "Saveney Lake" is located east of the lake at:

- 5.2 kilometres (3.2 mi) south-west of the mouth of the Hanotaux Bay;
- 18.0 kilometres (11.2 mi) south-west of the mouth of the Kaopatinak Pass;
- 39.3 kilometres (24.4 mi) south-west of the village center of Obedjiwan, Quebec which is located on a peninsula on the north shore of Gouin Reservoir;
- 96.4 kilometres (59.9 mi) west of Gouin Dam;
- 135.5 kilometres (84.2 mi) west of the village center of Wemotaci, Quebec (north shore of the Saint-Maurice River);
- 227 kilometres (141 mi) north-west of downtown La Tuque;
- 319 kilometres (198 mi) northwest of the mouth of the Saint-Maurice River (confluence with the St. Lawrence River at Trois-Rivières).

From the artificial mouth of "Saveney Lake", the current flows over 128.1 kilometres (79.6 mi) until Gouin Dam, according to the following segments:

- 5.3 kilometres (3.3 mi) north-east to the mouth of the Hanotaux Bay;
- 40.9 kilometres (25.4 mi) to the North-East crossing the Du Mâle Lake (Gouin Reservoir), then to the East crossing Bourgeois Lake (Gouin Reservoir) and Toussaint Lake to the south of the village of Obedjiwan, Quebec;
- 81.9 kilometres (50.9 mi) to the east, crossing in particular Marmette Lake, then to the South-East crossing notably Brochu Lake, then going across the Kikendatch Bay until Gouin Dam.
From this dam, the current flows along the Saint-Maurice River to Trois-Rivières where it flows onto the North Shore of the St. Lawrence River.

== Toponymy ==
The French toponym "lac Saveney" was formalized on December 5, 1968, by the Commission de toponymie du Québec, i.e. at the creation of this Commission.

== See also ==
- Saint-Maurice River, a watercourse
- Gouin Reservoir, a body of water
- Du Mâle Lake (Gouin Reservoir), a body of water
- Hanotaux Bay, a body of water
- Adolphe-Poisson Bay, a body of water
- La Tuque, a city
- List of lakes in Canada
