= Thibodeau Bay =

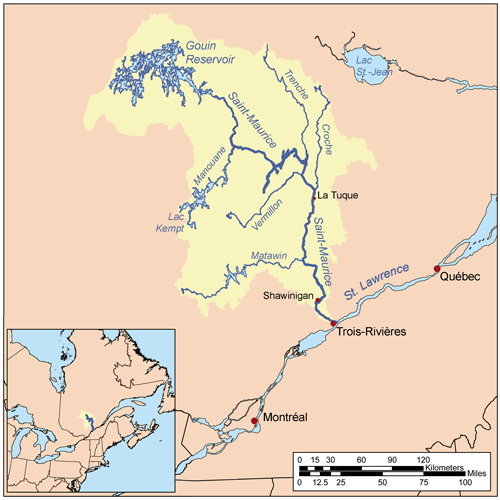
- Watershed of Saint-Maurice River

- Location within Quebec
- Location: La Tuque
- Coordinates: 48°35′57″N 75°03′55″W
- Type: Lake of dam
- Primary inflows: Du Mâle Lake (Gouin Reservoir)
- Primary outflows: Bourgeois Lake (Gouin Reservoir)
- Basin countries: Canada
- Max. length: 9.7 kilometres (6.0 mi)
- Max. width: 3.7 kilometres (2.3 mi)
- Surface elevation: 402 metres (1,319 ft)

Thibodeau Bay is a freshwater body located in the north central part of the Gouin Reservoir, in the territory of the town of La Tuque, in the administrative region of the Mauricie, in the province of Quebec, in Canada.

This bay extends into the townships of Toussaint (northern part of the bay) and Lemay (southern part of the bay).

Recreotourism activities are the main economic activity of the sector. Forestry comes second. Recreational boating is particularly popular on this water, especially for sport fishing.

The Thibodeau Bay watershed is served on the side by secondary forest roads connected to the R2046 and R1045 forest roads that connect the village of Obedjiwan, Quebec.

The surface of Thibodeau Bay is usually frozen from mid-November to the end of April, however, safe ice circulation is generally from early December to late March. Water management at the Gouin Dam can lead to significant variations in the water level, particularly at the end of the winter when the water is lowered.

== Geography ==
Before the construction of the La Loutre Dam in 1916, creating the Gouin Reservoir, Thibodeau Bay had a smaller dimension. After the second raising of the waters in 1946 with the development of the Gouin Dam, Thibodeau Bay took on its current shape.

The main hydrographic slopes near Thibodeau Bay are:

- north side: Bourgeois Lake (Gouin Reservoir), De la Rencontre Creek, Aiapew Bay, Du Mâle Lake (Gouin Reservoir), Kanatakompeak Bay;
- east side: Bourgeois Lake (Gouin Reservoir), Toussaint Lake, Marmette Lake, McSweeney Lake, Magnan Lake;
- South side: Bureau Lake (Gouin Reservoir) (North Bay), Rocher-Matci Bay;
- west side: Du Mâle Lake (Gouin Reservoir), Plamondon Creek (Gouin Reservoir), Berthelot River, Pascagama River.

With a length of 16.3 kilometres (10.1 mi) (North-South direction), Thibodeau Bay stretches to the bottom of a narrow bay in the northern part of the lake (length of 1.6 kilometres (0.99 mi)) in the canton of Toussaint and opposite (south side) to a connecting strait with a bay on the east shore of Du Mâle Lake (Gouin Reservoir).

On the west side of Bourgeois Lake (Gouin Reservoir), an archipelago delimits Thibodeau Bay with the Du Mâle Lake (Gouin Reservoir). The largest of these islands has a length of 7.2 kilometres (4.5 mi) and a width of 3.1 kilometres (1.9 mi); it straddles the townships of Toussaint and Lemay. Thibodeau Bay is located on the south side of this island which is located at 6.0 kilometres (3.7 mi) west of Obedjiwan, Quebec village center. The rest of the west side of Thibodeau Bay is bounded by a series of islands that stand out on the Du Mâle Lake (Gouin Reservoir).

Thibodeau Bay is bounded on the east by a peninsula stretching northward on 4.1 kilometres (2.5 mi), which is extended to the North by an island of 2.9 kilometres (1.8 mi) (North-South direction). On the east side, this bay flows eastward by two straits in the Bourgeois Lake (Gouin Reservoir) bypassing the latter island.

The mouth of Thibodeau Bay is located northeast of the lake at:

- 12.3 kilometres (7.6 mi) north-east of the Kaopatinak Pass which separates the Du Mâle Lake (Gouin Reservoir) in two;
- 7.9 kilometres (4.9 mi) south-west of the village center of Obedjiwan, Quebec which is located on a peninsula on the north shore of the Gouin Reservoir;
- 75.6 kilometres (47.0 mi) west of Gouin Dam;
- 122.9 kilometres (76.4 mi) northwest of the village center of Wemotaci, Quebec (north shore of the Saint-Maurice River);
- 213 kilometres (132 mi) north-west of downtown La Tuque;
- 315.4 kilometres (196.0 mi) northwest of the mouth of the Saint-Maurice River (confluence with the St. Lawrence River at Trois-Rivières).

From the mouth of Thibodeau Bay, the current flows over 86.1 kilometres (53.5 mi) to Gouin Dam, according to the following segments:

- 9.5 kilometres (5.9 mi) to the North crossing the Bourgeois Lake (Gouin Reservoir), then to the East crossing the Toussaint Lake to the South of the village of Obedjiwan, Quebec;
- 81.9 kilometres (50.9 mi) to the east, crossing in particular Marmette Lake, then to the South-East crossing notably Brochu Lake, then across the Kikendatch Bay until Gouin Dam.
From this dam, the current flows along the Saint-Maurice River to Trois-Rivières where it flows onto the North Shore of the St. Lawrence River.

== Toponymy ==
The term "Thibodeau" is a family name of French origin.

The French toponym "Baie Thibodeau" was formalized on December 18, 1986, by the Commission de toponymie du Québec.

== See also ==
- Saint-Maurice River, a watercourse
- Gouin Reservoir, a body of water
- Toussaint Lake, a body of water
- Bourgeois Lake (Gouin Reservoir), a body of water
- Du Mâle Lake (Gouin Reservoir), a body of water
- La Tuque, a city
- List of lakes in Canada
