= Hanotaux Bay =

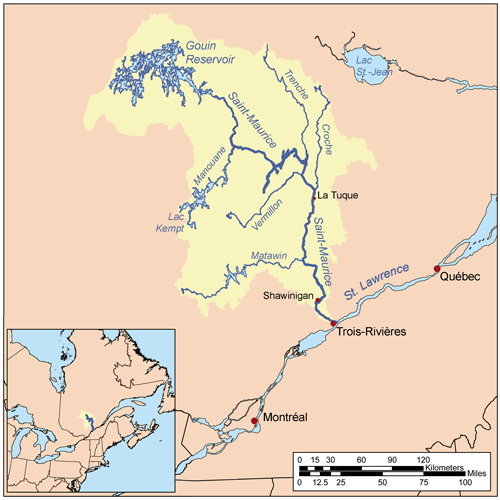
- Watershed of Saint-Maurice River

- Location within Quebec
- Location: La Tuque
- Coordinates: 48°31′08″N 75°21′22″W
- Type: Bay of dam
- Primary inflows: (clockwise); Straith fed by current of Adolphe-Poisson Bay.
- Primary outflows: Du Mâle Lake
- Basin countries: Canada
- Max. length: 8.0 kilometres (5.0 mi)
- Max. width: 3.0 kilometres (1.9 mi)
- Surface elevation: 402 metres (1,319 ft)

The Hanotaux Bay is a freshwater body located in the south-west part of Gouin Reservoir, in the territory of the town of La Tuque, in the administrative region of Mauricie, in the province of Quebec, in Canada.

This bay extends mainly in the canton of Hanotaux (part South-East) in the south-western part of the Gouin Reservoir. This bay is partially overflowing in Crémazie township (east side) and Poisson township (south side).

Recreotourism activities are the main economic activity of the sector. Forestry comes second.

A forest road running west of Pascagama River serves Hanotaux Bay. The R1009 Forest Road runs from the west side of Mattawa Bay into the lower Flapjack River into the northern part of Hanotaux Bay and the southern portion of Bureau Lake (Gouin Reservoir). This R1009 road joins the Southeast route 404 which serves the northern part of the Canadian National Railway.

The surface of Hanotaux Bay is usually frozen from mid-November to the end of April, however, safe ice circulation is generally from early December to late March.

== Geography ==
The main hydrographic slopes near Hanotaux Bay are:

- north side: Plamondon Bay, Du Mâle Lake, Plamondon Creek;
- east side: Gouin Reservoir, Du Mâle Lake, Bureau Lake (Gouin Reservoir) (North Bay);
- south side: Adolphe-Poisson Bay, Mattawa Bay, Saraana Bay, Bignell Creek, Flapjack River;
- west side: Saveney Lake, Du Poète Lake, Berthelot River, Pascagama Lake, Mégiscane River and Mercier Lake.

Hanotaux Bay, which is a length of 8.0 kilometres (5.0 mi), is shaped like a deformed X with an archipelago of about fifty islands at its center. This X is described as follows:

- the North-West arm stretches over 3.9 kilometres (2.4 mi) forming some secondary bays;
- the Northeast arm has a bay of 1.8 kilometres (1.1 mi) which is crossed off to the east by a peninsula stretching south for about 2.5 kilometres (1.6 mi), limit of the cantons of Crémazie and Hanotaux;
- the Southeast arm (length: 0.7 kilometres (0.43 mi)) includes the outlet of the bay, attached to the southwestern part of Du Mâle Lake;
- the Southwest arm stretches over 3.6 kilometres (2.2 mi) as far as Poisson Township by collecting the waters of the Adolphe-Poisson Bay.

The current from the Adolphe-Poisson Bay bypasses the South on 5.0 kilometres (3.1 mi) and by the North on 6.1 kilometres (3.8 mi), an island (length: 5.5 kilometres (3.4 mi)) which delimits the southern part of the mouth of Hanotaux Bay. On the north side of this island, waters from the Adolphe-Poisson Bay mix with the waters of Hanotaux Bay near the mouth of the bay.

Hanotaux Bay is mainly fed by the Adolphe-Poisson Bay outlet, which is itself fed by Bignell Creek (on the south side) and by the Lake of the Poète (West side) via the Piciw Minikanan Bay. This canal was built at the same time as the Mégiscane Dam at the mouth of the Du Poète Lake, thus diverting the water from the upper part of the Mégiscane River to Gouin Reservoir via the Adolphe-Poisson Bay, then the Hanotaux bay.

The mouth of Hanotaux Bay is located in the Southeast at:

- 14.6 kilometres (9.1 mi) north-east of the mouth of the canal from Lake of the Poète;
- 14.0 kilometres (8.7 mi) northeast of the mouth of Bignell Creek;
- 35.3 kilometres (21.9 mi) south-west of the village center of Obedjiwan, Quebec which is located on a peninsula on the north shore of Gouin Reservoir;
- 96.3 kilometres (59.8 mi) south-west of the Gouin Dam;
- 132.3 kilometres (82.2 mi) west of the village center of Wemotaci, Quebec (north shore of the Saint-Maurice River);
- 223 kilometres (139 mi) north-west of downtown La Tuque;
- 318 kilometres (198 mi) northwest of the mouth of the Saint-Maurice River (confluence with the St. Lawrence River at Trois-Rivières).

From the mouth of Hanotaux Bay (located between the large island at the mouth of the Adolphe-Poisson Bay) and the peninsula from the North, the current flows over 122.8 kilometres (76.3 mi) to Gouin Dam, according to the following segments:

- 40.9 kilometres (25.4 mi) northeasterly across the western part of Gouin Reservoir including the Du Mâle Lake to the south of Obedjiwan, Quebec;
- 81.9 kilometres (50.9 mi) to the East, crossing the Marmette Lake, then to the South-East crossing in particular the Brochu Lake then to the East crossing the Kikendatch Bay until Gouin Dam.

From this dam, the current flows along the Saint-Maurice River to Trois-Rivières.

== Toponymy ==
This hydronym evokes the work of life of the academician Gabriel Hanotaux (Beaurevoir, Ainse, 1853 - Paris, 1944) including his participation in the First Congress of the French language in Canada held in Quebec City in 1912 Hanotaux was president of the Champlain Mission composed of several French personalities, politicians and men of letters.

Gabriel Hanotaux has had a prestigious career. Archivist-paleographer, Hanotaux is a professor at the "Ecole des Hautes Etudes" before becoming a Foreign Affairs Attaché and fulfilling several diplomatic missions, notably in Constantinople. Member of the Aisne (1886), he was Minister of Foreign Affairs from 1894 to 1898. He devoted himself thereafter to his work as a historian.

Specialist of Richelieu and Egyptian history, Hanotaux directs, between 1920 and 1929, the publication "Histoire de la nation française" (‘English: "History of the French nation") whose first volume contains the important "Human Geography of France", written by Jean Brunhes. From 1930 to 1934, he published, in collaboration, a History of the French colonies and the expansion of France in the world, a work where Canada and Quebec occupy a good place. The toponym "Baie Hanotaux" was adopted by the Commission de géographie, the current Commission de toponymie du Québec, on July 5, 1951.

The toponym "Baie Hanotaux" was formalized on June 12, 1970, by the Commission de toponymie du Québec.

== See also ==
- Saint-Maurice River, a watercourse
- Gouin Reservoir, a body of water
- Kikendatch Bay, a body of water
- Brochu Lake, a body of water
- McSeeney Lake, a body of water
- Marmette Lake, a body of water
- Du Mâle Lake, a body of water
- Adolphe-Poisson Bay, a body of water
- Lake of the Poète, a body of water
- Mégiscane River, a watercourse
- Suzie River, a watercourse
- Piciw Minikanan Bay, a body of water
- Bignell Creek, a watercourse
- La Tuque, a city
- List of lakes in Canada
