= Saraana Bay =

- Location within Quebec
- Location: La Tuque
- Coordinates: 48°26′10″N 75°15′00″W
- Type: Baie of dam
- Primary inflows: (clockwise); Tessier Lake (Gouin Reservoir) outlet.
- Primary outflows: Du Rocher-Matci Bay, Gouin Reservoir
- Basin countries: Canada
- Max. length: 16.4 kilometres (10.2 mi)
- Max. width: 13.3 kilometres (8.3 mi)
- Surface elevation: 402 metres (1,319 ft)

Saraana Bay is a freshwater body of the southwestern part of Gouin Reservoir, in the territory of the town of La Tuque, in the administrative region of Mauricie, in the province of Quebec, in Canada.

This bay extends into the townships of Crémazie (northern part), Évanturel (southern part) and Poisson (a bay on the west side). Following the completion of the Gouin Dam in 1948, the navigability area of Gouin Reservoir and Saraana Bay increased significantly. The water level can vary significantly depending on the management of the Gouin Dam; the level usually falls in late winter in anticipation of the spring freshet.

Recreotourism activities are the main economic activity of the sector. Forestry comes second.

The Forest Road R1009 passes from the west side of Mattawa Bay serving the lower Flapjack River into the northern part of Tessier Lake (Gouin Reservoir) (located south of Saraana Bay). and the southern part of Bureau Lake (Gouin Reservoir). This R1009 road joins the Southeast route 404 which serves the northern part of the Canadian National Railway.

The surface of Saraana Bay is usually frozen from mid-November to the end of April, however, safe ice circulation is usually from early December to the end of March.

== Geography ==
The main hydrographic slopes near Saraana Bay are:

- North side: Gouin Reservoir, Du Mâle Lake, Hanotaux Bay, Plamondon Bay, Kaopatinak Pass;
- East side: Bureau Lake (Gouin Reservoir), Nemio River, Nemio Lake, Lepage Lake;
- South side: Tessier Lake outlet, Tessier Lake (Gouin Reservoir), Flapjack River, Clova River;
- West side: Mattawa Bay, Adolphe-Poisson Bay, Saveney Lake, Bignell Creek, Tamarac River.

On the east side, Saraana Bay is separated from Bureau Lake (Gouin Reservoir) by a peninsula advancing on 16.2 kilometres (10.1 mi) to the North, almost to the village of Obedjiwan, Quebec. On the west side, Saraana Bay is separated from Mattawa Bay by a peninsula on the north-east of 33 kilometres (21 mi). This peninsula includes the "Pike Head Mountain" (elevation: 453 metres (1,486 ft)) on the east side of a strait connecting the northern part of Mattawa Bay with its South.

Saraana Bay is 16.4 kilometres (10.2 mi) long and includes many islands, including “Aux Mouettes Island” and “Police Island”. Saraana Bay is fed by:

- South side: the discharge of a group of lakes including Tessier, Arcand, Dareche, Achintre, Kaotoskonakamak and Gasparo;
- East side: the discharge of a set of unidentified lakes that empties into the southern part of a bay southeast of Saraana Bay;
- Northeast side: an unidentified bay.

The mouth of Saraana Bay is located at:

- 25.6 kilometres (15.9 mi) south-west of the village center of Obedjiwan, Quebec which is located on a peninsula on the north shore of Gouin Reservoir;
- 76.5 kilometres (47.5 mi) west of Gouin Dam;
- 105.7 kilometres (65.7 mi) northwest of the village center of Wemotaci, Quebec (north shore of the Saint-Maurice River);
- 197 kilometres (122 mi) west of downtown La Tuque;
- 295 kilometres (183 mi) northwest of the mouth of the Saint-Maurice River (confluence with the St. Lawrence River at Trois-Rivières).

The mouth of a width of 0.3 kilometres (0.19 mi) of Saraana Bay is located to the northeast being barred by an island with a length of 9.5 kilometres (5.9 mi) (west side of the river mouth) and a peninsula (on the east side) stretching westward 3.8 kilometres (2.4 mi). From there, the current crosses the "Bay of Rocher-Matci" which is attached to the Du Mâle Lake by the Kaopatinak pass.

From the mouth of Saraana Bay, the current flows over 116 kilometres (72 mi) to Gouin Dam, according to the following segments:

- 34.1 kilometres (21.2 mi) to the northeast, crossing the Du Mâle Lake and the western part of Gouin Reservoir to the middle of Toussaint Lake located at South of village Obedjiwan, Quebec;
- 81.9 kilometres (50.9 mi) to the East, crossing the Marmette Lake, then to the South-East crossing in particular the Brochu Lake (Gouin Reservoir) then to the East crossing the Kikendatch Bay until Gouin Dam.

From this dam, the current flows along the Saint-Maurice River to Trois-Rivières.

== Toponymy ==
In the Atikamek language, this hydronym translates as "Des-Filles-d'Anna" bay.

The toponym "Baie Saraana" was formalized on December 5, 1968, by the Commission de toponymie du Québec, i.e. when it was created.

== See also ==
- Brochu Lake, a body of water
- List of lakes in Canada
