= Bignell Creek =

Location
- Country: Canada
- Province: Quebec
- Region: Mauricie

Physical characteristics
- Source: Unidentified Lake
  - location: La Tuque (Provancher Township), Mauricie, Quebec
  - coordinates: 48°17′26″N 75°26′35″W
  - elevation: 424 m (1,391 ft)
- Mouth: Adolphe-Poisson Bay
  - location: La Tuque (Poisson Township), Mauricie, Quebec
  - coordinates: 48°23′26″N 75°25′40″W
  - elevation: 402 m (1,319 ft)
- Length: 8.7 km (5.4 mi)

Bignell Creek is a tributary of the Adolphe-Poisson Bay located on the southwestern side of the Gouin Reservoir. This stream runs entirely in forest zone in the town of La Tuque, in the administrative region of Mauricie, in Quebec, in Canada.

Bignell stream flows successively into the Provancher and Poisson townships.

Forestry is the main economic activity of this valley; recreational tourism activities, second.

A secondary forest road will loosen the western part of the Bignell Creek valley. The route 404, connecting the village of Clova, Quebec to the South Bay of Bureau Lake (Gouin Reservoir) serves the south of Lac Duchamp and the West of Tessier Lake (Gouin Reservoir); this road connects to the south-east the route 400 which goes to Gouin Dam. Some secondary forest roads are in use at proximity to forestry and recreational tourism activities.

The surface of Bignell Brook is usually frozen from mid-November to the end of April, however, safe ice circulation is generally from early December to late March.

== Geography ==
The hydrographic slope of Bignell Creek is most westerly on the side of the Gouin Reservoir; the watershed limit with the Mégiscane River is located on the west side between 15 kilometres (9.3 mi) and 30 kilometres (19 mi) of the Bignell Creek. The adjacent hydrographic slopes of Bignell Creek are:
- north side: Gouin Reservoir, Mattawa Bay, Adolphe-Poisson Bay, Hanotaux Bay, Saraana Bay;
- east side: Flapjack River, Tessier Lake (Gouin Reservoir), Oskélanéo River, Oskélanéo Lake, Bureau Lake (Gouin Reservoir);
- south side: Flapjack River, Tamarac River (Gatineau River), Clova River, Aux Bleuets River;
- west side: Tamarac River (Gatineau River), Provancher Creek, Mégiscane River.

Bignell Brook originates at the mouth of an unidentified lake (length: 1.6 kilometres (0.99 mi); altitude: 424 metres (1,391 ft)) surrounded by marshes. The mouth of this head lake is located at:

- 20.0 kilometres (12.4 mi) north-west of the village center of Clova, Quebec where the Canadian National Railway passes;
- 11.9 kilometres (7.4 mi) south of the mouth of Bignell Creek (confluence with the Adolphe-Poisson Bay);
- 22.4 kilometres (13.9 mi) South of the mouth of Adolphe-Poisson Bay;
- 55.0 kilometres (34.2 mi) south-west of the village center of Obedjiwan, Quebec (located on a peninsula on the north shore of Gouin Reservoir);
- 99.3 kilometres (61.7 mi) southwest of the Gouin dam erected at the mouth of the Gouin Reservoir (confluence with the Saint-Maurice River).

From the mouth of the head lake, the course of Bignell Creek flows over 8.7 kilometres (5.4 mi) according to the following segments:

- 3.2 kilometres (2.0 mi) north, first crossing an unidentified lake (length: 0.9 kilometres (0.56 mi); altitude: 423 metres (1,388 ft)), then a second unidentified lake (length: 1.5 kilometres (0.93 mi); altitude: 422 metres (1,385 ft)), to the mouth of the latter;
- 5.8 kilometres (3.6 mi) north to the southern limit of Poisson Township;
- 5.6 kilometres (3.5 mi) North in Poisson Township crossing three unidentified lakes to the mouth of the last;
- 2.9 kilometres (1.8 mi) west, then north, in Provancher Township, to the mouth of the river.

The mouth of Bignell Creek is located at:

- 29.5 kilometres (18.3 mi) north of the Canadian National Railway);
- 31.5 kilometres (19.6 mi) north-west of the village center of Clova, Quebec;
- 9.3 kilometres (5.8 mi) south of the mouth of the Adolphe-Poisson Bay;
- 46.3 kilometres (28.8 mi) south-west of the village center of Obedjiwan, Quebec which is located on a peninsula on the north shore of Gouin Reservoir;
- 98.6 kilometres (61.3 mi) south-west of Gouin Dam;
- 135 kilometres (84 mi) west of the village center of Wemotaci, Quebec (north shore of the Saint-Maurice River);
- 224 kilometres (139 mi) north-west of downtown La Tuque.

The mouth of Bignell Creek joins the Adolphe-Poisson Bay. From there, the current flows over 135.2 kilometres (84.0 mi) until Gouin Dam, according to the following segments:

- 12.7 kilometres (7.9 mi) to the North crossing the Adolphe-Poisson Bay, then to the North-East crossing a strait to Du Mâle Lake;
- 40.6 kilometres (25.2 mi) north-east crossing the Male Lake and the western part of Gouin Reservoir to the height of the village of Obedjiwan, Quebec;
- 81.9 kilometres (50.9 mi) to the East, crossing the Marmette Lake, then to the South-East crossing in particular the Brochu Lake then to the East crossing the Kikendatch Bay until Gouin Dam.
From this dam, the current flows along the Saint-Maurice River to Trois-Rivières.

== Toponymy ==
The term "Bignell" refers to a family name of English origin.

The toponym "ruisseau Bignell" was formalized on December 5, 1968 at the Commission de toponymie du Québec, when it was created.

== See also ==
- Saint-Maurice River
- Gouin Reservoir, a body of water
- Kikendatch Bay, a body of water
- Brochu Lake, a body of water
- Nevers Lake, a body of water
- McSweeney Lake, a body of water
- Marmette Lake, a body of water
- Du Mâle Lake, a body of water
- Hanotaux Bay, a body of water
- Adolphe-Poisson Bay, a body of water
- La Tuque, a city
- List of rivers of Quebec
