= Mattawa Bay =

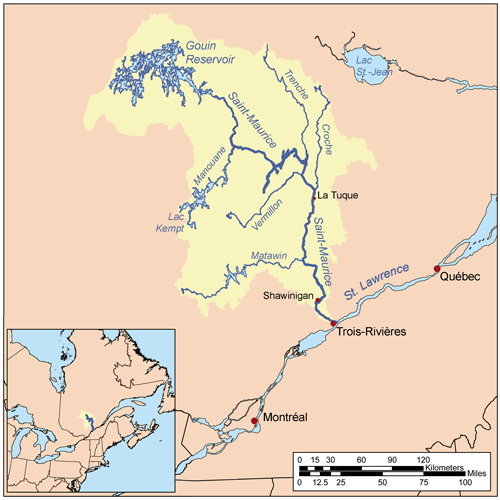
- Watershed of Saint-Maurice River

- Location within Quebec
- Location: La Tuque
- Coordinates: 48°26′14″N 75°20′46″W
- Type: Lake of dam
- Primary inflows: (clockwise); Outlet la "De La Chance Lake"; Flapjack River.
- Primary outflows: Du Mâle Lake, Gouin Reservoir
- Basin countries: Canada
- Max. length: 17.0 kilometres (10.6 mi)
- Max. width: 3.0 kilometres (1.9 mi)
- Surface elevation: 402 metres (1,319 ft)

Mattawa Bay is a freshwater body of the southwestern part of the Gouin Reservoir in the territory of the town of La Tuque, in the Mauricie administrative region, in the province of Quebec, in Canada.

This lake extends in the canton of Poisson and Evanturel. Following the completion of the Gouin Dam in 1948, Mattawa Bay is in its present form as part of the Gouin Reservoir.

Recreotourism activities are the main economic activity of the sector. Forestry comes second.

Some forest roads serve the valleys of the Flapjack River, Bignell Creek and the Mégiscane River. These forest road branches connect to route 404 which serves the Mattawa Bay Valley and connects to the Southeast at route 400 which connects the Gouin Dam to the village of Parent, Quebec via the river valleys Jean-Pierre and Leblanc.

The surface of Mattawa Bay is usually frozen from mid-November to the end of April, but safe ice circulation is generally from early December to the end of March.

== Geography ==
The main drainage slopes adjacent to Mattawa Bay are:
- north side: Gouin Reservoir, Adolphe-Poisson Baie, Hanotaux Bay, Plamondon Bay;
- east side: Saraana Bay, Bureau Lake (Gouin Reservoir), Nemio River, Nemio Lake, Lepage Lake;
- south side: Flapjack River, Bignell Creek, Clova River, Tessier Lake (Gouin Reservoir);
- west side: Hanotaux Bay, Saveney Lake, Bignell Creek, Tamarac River (Gatineau River).

Mattawa Bay is separated from Saraana Bay (located to the east) by a peninsula advancing northward on 13.3 kilometres (8.3 mi). This peninsula includes the "Mont de la Tête au Brochet" (English: Mount of the Pike Head) (elevation: 453 metres (1,486 ft)) on the east bank of a strait connecting the northern part of Mattawa Bay with its southern part.

Mattawa Bay is separated from Adolphe-Poisson Bay (located to the west and northwest) by a peninsula advancing northward on 11.7 kilometres (7.3 mi) and an island (length: 5.6 kilometres (3.5 mi)). The latter island blocks the mouth of the Hanotaux Bay (south side of the mouth) and the mouth of Mattawa Bay (west side of the mouth). Another island (length: 2.2 kilometres (1.4 mi)) straddles the eastern side of the mouth of Mattawa Bay.

With a length of 17.0 kilometres (10.6 mi), Mattawa Bay has many islands. This bay is fed on the south side by the Flapjack River.

The mouth of Mattawa Bay is located at:

- 2.4 kilometres (1.5 mi) east of the mouth of Saraana Bay;
- 2.0 kilometres (1.2 mi) west of the mouth of the Hanotaux Bay;
- 33.4 kilometres (20.8 mi) south-west of the village center of Obedjiwan, Quebec which is located on a peninsula on the north shore of Gouin Reservoir;
- 90 kilometres (56 mi) south-west of Gouin Dam;
- 130 kilometres (81 mi) northwest of the village center of Wemotaci, Quebec (north shore of the Saint-Maurice River);
- 219 kilometres (136 mi) west of downtown La Tuque;
- 316 kilometres (196 mi) northwest of the mouth of the Saint-Maurice River (confluence with the St. Lawrence River at Trois-Rivières).

The mouth of Mattawa Bay converges to the northeast with a larger bay attached to Male Lake. From the mouth of Mattawa Bay, the current flows over 116.9 kilometres (72.6 mi) to Gouin Dam, according to the following segments:

- 35.0 kilometres (21.7 mi) north-east, crossing the Du Mâle Lake and the western part of Gouin Reservoir to the height of Obedjiwan, Quebec village;
- 81.9 kilometres (50.9 mi) to the East, crossing the Marmette Lake, then to the South-East crossing in particular the Brochu Lake (Gouin Reservoir) then to the East crossing the Kikendatch Bay until Gouin Dam.
From this dam, the current flows along the Saint-Maurice River to Trois-Rivières.

== Toponymy ==
The toponym "Baie Mattawa" was formalized on December 5, 1968, by the Commission de toponymie du Québec, when it was created.

== See also ==
- Saint-Maurice River, a watercourse
- Gouin Reservoir, a body of water
- Kikendatch Bay, a body of water
- Brochu Lake, a body of water
- McSeeney Lake, a body of water
- Marmette Lake, a body of water
- Du Mâle Lake, a body of water
- Hanotaux Bay, a body of water
- Adolphe-Poisson Bay, a body of water
- Saraana Bay, a body of water
- La Tuque, a city
- List of lakes in Canada
