= Du Mâle Lake (Gouin Reservoir) =

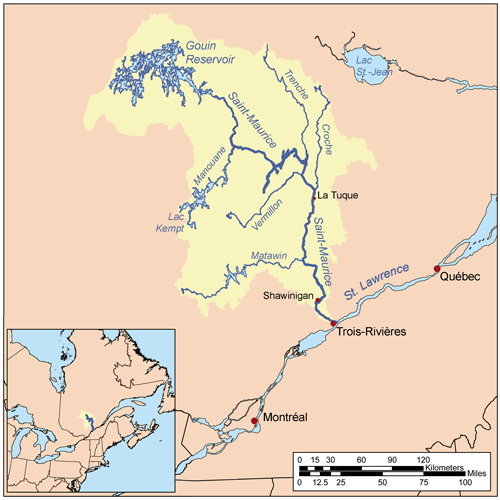
- Watershed of Saint-Maurice River

- Location within Quebec
- Location: La Tuque
- Coordinates: 48°35′05″N 75°08′24″W
- Type: Lake of dam
- Primary inflows: (clockwise from the mouth); Flapjack River (via Mattawa Bay); Bignell Creek (via Adolphe-Poisson Bay); The canal of Du Poète Lake (via Piciw Minikanan Bay); outlet of Saveney Lake (via Adolphe-Poisson Bay); Hanotaux Bay; Plamondon Bay (Gouin Reservoir) (via Plamondon Bay); Miller Lake; Piponisiw River; De la Rencontre Creek.
- Primary outflows: Bourgeois Lake (Gouin Reservoir)
- Basin countries: Canada
- Max. length: 36.6 kilometres (22.7 mi)
- Max. width: 14.1 kilometres (8.8 mi)
- Surface elevation: 402 metres (1,319 ft)

The Male Lake is a freshwater body located in the western part of the Gouin Reservoir, in the territory of the town of La Tuque, in the administrative region of the Mauricie, in the province of Quebec, in Canada.

This lake extends mainly in the cantons of Lacasse (northern part of the lake), Toussaint (north-east), Hanotaux (west), Crémazie (center west), Lemay (center east), Poisson (South-West) and Evanturel (South-Central).

Recreotourism activities are the main economic activity of the sector. Forestry comes second. Recreational boating is particularly popular on this water, especially for sport fishing.

The hydrographic slope of the "Du Mâle Lake" is served on the side:

- North, by the forest roads R2046 and R1045 which connects the village of Obedjiwan, Quebec;
- West, by the forest road R1009, serving the Gouin Reservoir;
- South, by the forest road R1009 and the R040.

The surface of Male Lake is usually frozen from mid-November to the end of April, however, safe ice circulation is generally from early December to late March. Water management at the Gouin Dam can lead to significant variations in the water level, particularly at the end of the winter when the water is lowered.

== Geography ==
Before the completion of the construction of the La Loutre Dam in 1916, creating the Gouin Reservoir, the "Du Mâle Lake" was close to 30 kilometres (19 mi) in length and was the main body of water of the head of the Saint-Maurice River. After the second raising of the waters in 1946 with the development of the Gouin Dam, the "Du Mâle Lake" took its present form, forming numerous bays through marshy banks. This body of water has several bays that once formed neighboring lakes: Plamondon Bay (Gouin Reservoir) in the West, Mattawa Bay in the Southwest, Saraana Bay in the South and Aiapew Bay to the Northeast.

The main hydrographic slopes near the Male Lake are:

- north side: De la Rencontre Creek, Plamondon Creek (Gouin Reservoir), Pascagama River, Toussaint River;
- east side: Bourgeois Lake, Thibodeau Bay, Toussaint Lake, Marmette Lake, Bureau Lake (Gouin Reservoir) (North Bay), Nemio River, Rocher-Matci Bay;
- south side: Bureau Lake (Gouin Reservoir) (South Bay), Hanotaux Bay, Adolphe-Poisson Bay, Mattawa Bay, Saraana Bay, Bignell Creek, Flapjack River, Rock-Matci Bay;
- west side: Berthelot River, Pascagama River, Plamondon Creek (Gouin Reservoir), Hanotaux Bay, Adolphe-Poisson Bay, Saveney Lake, Mégiscane River and Mercier Lake.

With a length of 36.6 kilometres (22.7 mi), from the mouth of Mattawa Bay, the Male Lake stretches northeast to Aiapew Bay in the northern part of Bourgeois Lake. Deformed in nature, the "Du Mâle Lake" has several dozens of islands, peninsulas and bays. The "Du Mâle Lake" narrows to only 1.0 kilometre (0.62 mi) at its center, forming the Kaopatinak Pass (length: 2.1 kilometres (1.3 mi)), because of a peninsula advancing on 5.7 kilometres (3.5 mi) towards the North-West and opposite a peninsula advancing on 4.1 kilometres (2.5 mi) towards the South-East.

Northeast part of the lake

The northeastern part of the lake stretches over 16.4 kilometres (10.2 mi) by 9.4 kilometres (5.8 mi), forming several secondary bays, such Miller Lake (Gouin Reservoir). Its main tributaries are the Piponisiw River and the De la Rencontre Creek (coming from the North).

Northeast of the lake, an archipelago delineates the "Du Mâle Lake" with the Bourgeois Lake. The largest of these islands has a length of 6.9 kilometres (4.3 mi) and a width of 2.9 kilometres (1.8 mi); it straddles the townships of Toussaint and Lemay. Delimited in its southern side by the "Bay of Eagles", this island is located at 6.0 kilometres (3.7 mi) west of the village center of Obedjiwan, Quebec. Southwest of Bourgeois Lake, Thibodeau Bay also extends behind this archipelago.

Southwest part of the lake

The southwestern part of the lake stretches on 10.7 kilometres (6.6 mi) by 12.4 kilometres (7.7 mi), until the Kaopatinak Pass which is located at the center of the lake. This southwestern part includes the following main bays: Saraana, Mattawa Bay, Adolphe-Poisson, Hanotaux and Plamondon.

The largest island of this part of the lake has a length of 8.0 kilometres (5.0 mi); it delineates the Matci Rock Bay, located on the east side of the southeastern part of the lake.

The mouth of "Du Mâle Lake" is located northeast of the lake, at:

- 7.6 kilometres (4.7 mi) west of the village center of Obedjiwan, Quebec which is located on a peninsula on the north shore of Gouin Reservoir;
- 78 kilometres (48 mi) west of Gouin Dam;
- 127 kilometres (79 mi) northwest of the village center of Wemotaci, Quebec (north shore of the Saint-Maurice River);
- 216 kilometres (134 mi) north-west of downtown La Tuque;
- 320 kilometres (200 mi) northwest of the mouth of the Saint-Maurice River (confluence with the St. Lawrence River at Trois-Rivières).

From the mouth of "Du Mâle Lake", the current flows over 89.5 kilometres (55.6 mi) to Gouin Dam, according to the following segments:

- 7.6 kilometres (4.7 mi) easterly crossing the Bourgeois Lake to the south of the village Obedjiwan, Quebec;
- 81.9 kilometres (50.9 mi) to the east, crossing in particular Marmette Lake, then to the South-East crossing notably Brochu Lake, then across the Kikendatch Bay toward Gouin Dam.
From this dam, the current flows along the Saint-Maurice River to Trois-Rivières where it flows onto the North Shore of the St. Lawrence River.

== Toponymy ==
Formerly, this body of water was designated in the Innu language "Ayamba Sacahigan", as noted in 1871 by the surveyor John Bignell, meaning "lake to the male". In 1980, a survey carried out in Attikamek territory lists the name "Aiapew Sakahikan", which translates as "male moose lake". The form "Acohonan", meaning "lake where we can cross" is also known to Attikameks. Officially, until 1945, this body of water was designated "Grand lac du Mâle".

The southern part of "Du Mâle Lake" includes a bay designated "Petit lac du Mâle" (English: "Little Male Lake") which includes the "Sandbank". This bay is located on the north shore between Plamondon Bay (Gouin Reservoir) and Kaopatinak Pass. This toponymic designation dates from the early 1980s.

The toponym "Lac du Mâle" was formalized on December 18, 1986, by the Commission de toponymie du Québec.

== See also ==
- Saint-Maurice River, a watercourse
- Gouin Reservoir, a body of water
- Bourgeois Lake, a body of water
- Thibodeau Bay, a body of water
- Rocher-Matci Bay, a body of water
- Saraana Bay, a body of water
- Mattawa Bay, a body of water
- Plamondon Bay, a body of water
- Plamondon Creek, a watercourse
- Piponisiw River, a watercourse
- De la Rencontre Creek, a watercourse
- Aiapew Baie, a body of water
- La Tuque, a city
- List of lakes in Canada
