= Flapjack River =

Flapjack

Location
- Country: Canada
- Province: Quebec
- Region: Mauricie

Physical characteristics
- Source: Gut Lake
  - location: La Tuque (Buies Township), Mauricie, Quebec
  - coordinates: 48°05′27″N 75°25′45″W
  - elevation: 439 m (1,440 ft)
- Mouth: Mattawa Bay
  - location: La Tuque (Poisson Township), Mauricie, Quebec
  - coordinates: 48°20′54″N 75°22′42″W
  - elevation: 402 m (1,319 ft)
- Length: 39.2 km (24.4 mi)

Basin features
- Tributaries
  - left: (upstream); Outlet of lake Pat; outlet of lake Bazin; outlet of lake Stanley; outlet of lake Gawn.
  - right: (upstream); Outlet of "lake à la Pitoune » and « lake à Foisy »; outlet of "Lake à Leclerc".

The Flapjack River is a tributary of the Mattawa Bay of the Southwest of Gouin Reservoir, flowing into the town of La Tuque, into the administrative area of the Mauricie, in Quebec, in Canada.

The Flapjack River flows successively into the townships of Buies, Provencher and Poisson. Forestry is the main economic activity of this valley; recreational tourism activities, second.

Forest Road R1009 intersects the lower Flapjack River watershed approximately one kilometre upstream of the mouth of the river. This road serves the western part of the Gouin Reservoir and connects to the Southeast to the R0404 Forest Road. Some secondary forest roads are in use nearby for forestry and recreational tourism activities.

The surface of the Flapjack River is usually frozen from mid-November to the end of April, however, safe ice movement is generally from early December to late March.

== Geography ==
The hydrographic slopes adjacent to the Flapjack River are:
- north side: Gouin Reservoir, Mattawa Bay, Hanotaux Bay, Plamondon Creek, Saraana Bay;
- east side: Arcand Lake, Bureau Lake (Gouin Reservoir) (South Bay), Oskélanéo River, Tessier Lake (Gouin Reservoir);
- south side: Clova River, Douville River, Tamarac River (Gatineau River);
- west side: Tamarac River (Gatineau River), Provancher Creek, Médora Lake, Mégiscane River, Suzie River, Bignell Creek, Chassaigne Lake.

The Flapjack River originates at the mouth of a Gut Lake (length: 0.8 kilometres (0.50 mi); altitude: 439 metres (1,440 ft)). The mouth of this head lake is located at:

- 5.5 kilometres (3.4 mi) south-west of the village center of Clova, Quebec;
- 2.9 kilometres (1.8 mi) east of the Tamarac River (Gatineau River);
- 28.9 kilometres (18.0 mi) south of the mouth of the Flapjack River (confluence with Mattawa Bay);
- 72.2 kilometres (44.9 mi) south-west of the village center of Obedjiwan, Quebec (located on a peninsula on the north shore of Gouin Reservoir);
- 103 kilometres (64 mi) south-west of the Gouin Dam erected at the mouth of the Gouin Reservoir (confluence with the Saint-Maurice River).

From the mouth of the head lake, the Flapjack River flows over 39.2 kilometres (24.4 mi) according to the following segments:

- 4.1 kilometres (2.5 mi) north across Elsie Lake (length: 1.2 kilometres (0.75 mi); altitude: 432 metres (1,417 ft)) on its full length, up to at the Canadian National Railway;
- 7.3 kilometres (4.5 mi) to the north crossing the Bull Lake (length: 6.7 kilometres (4.2 mi); altitude: 423 metres (1,388 ft)) on 5.5 kilometres (3.4 mi) to a bridge on a forest road;
- 3.7 kilometres (2.3 mi) to the Northwest, crossing Lake Tozer (length: 2.4 kilometres (1.5 mi); altitude: 422 metres (1,385 ft)) and the southern part Ada Lake (length: 1.9 kilometres (1.2 mi); altitude: 421 metres (1,381 ft)) to the southern limit of Provancher Township;
- 9.9 kilometres (6.2 mi) northeasterly in Provancher Township crossing the northern portion of Ada Lake and Stone Lake (length: 4.8 kilometres (3.0 mi); elevation: 420 metres (1,380 ft)) which is formed by a widening of the river, until the discharge of the "Lake at Foisy" and "Lake à la Pitoune";
- 13.1 kilometres (8.1 mi) north through a segment of 8.0 kilometres (5.0 mi) where the river widens to the southern limit of the township of Poisson;
- 1.1 kilometres (0.68 mi) north in the Township of Poisson to the mouth of the river.

The mouth of the Flapjack River is located at: South of the mouth of Mattawa Bay;

- 46.9 kilometres (29.1 mi) south-west of the village centre of Obedjiwan which is located on a peninsula on the north shore of Gouin Reservoir;
- 94.8 kilometres (58.9 mi) south-west of Gouin Dam;
- 129 kilometres (80 mi) west of the village centre of Wemotaci (north shore of the Saint-Maurice River);
- 217.7 kilometres (135.3 mi) north-west of downtown La Tuque.

The mouth of the Flapjack River meets with Mattawa Bay. From there, the current flows over 164.9 kilometres (102.5 mi) until Gouin dam, according to the following segments:

- 53.0 kilometres (32.9 mi) northeasterly, crossing Mattawa Bay, Du Mâle Lake and the western portion of Gouin Reservoir to the height of Obedjiwan Village;
- 81.9 kilometres (50.9 mi) to the East, crossing the Marmette Lake, then to the South-East crossing in particular the Brochu Lake then to the East crossing the Kikendatch Bay until Gouin Dam.
From this dam, the current flows along the Saint-Maurice River to Trois-Rivières.

== Toponymy ==
The term flapjack refers to a cake of British origin, resembling an energy bar. The main ingredients are: oat flakes, butter, brown sugar and golden syrup.

The toponym "Flapjack River" was formalized on December 5, 1968 at the Commission de toponymie du Québec, when it was created.

== See also ==
- Saint-Maurice River
- Gouin Reservoir, a body of water
- Kikendatch Bay, a body of water
- Brochu Lake, a body of water
- Nevers Lake, a body of water
- McSweeney Lake, a body of water
- Marmette Lake, a body of water
- Du Mâle Lake, a body of water
- Mattawa Bay, a body of water
- La Tuque, a city
- List of rivers of Quebec
