= La Loutre Dam =

Dam in La Tuque, Quebec

Coordinates: 48°20′17″N 74°3′20″W

The La Loutre dam (in French: Barrage La Loutre) is a river infrastructure downstream from the Gouin Dam. This dam is the second on the Saint-Maurice River from the source (Gouin Reservoir). It is located in the city of La Tuque, in Mauricie, in the province of Quebec, in Canada.

== Geography ==
An island 0.2 kilometres (0.12 mi) in diameter separates the two sections of the La Loutre dam.

The main hydrographic slopes near the La Loutre dam are:

- North side: Wabano River, Faguy River;
- East side: Saint-Maurice River;
- South side: Cypress River (La Tuque);
- West side: Saint-Maurice River, Gouin Reservoir.

The right-hand hose reel of the La Loutre dam is located at:

- 1.5 kilometres (0.93 mi) southwest of the mouth of the Wabano River (confluence with the Saint-Maurice River);
- 3.4 kilometres (2.1 mi) south-east of Gouin Dam (confluence with the Saint-Maurice River);
- 74.4 kilometres (46.2 mi) south-east of the center of the village of Obedjiwan which is located on a peninsula on the north shore of Gouin Reservoir;
- 53.0 kilometres (32.9 mi) northwest of the center of the village of Wemotaci (north shore of the Saint-Maurice River);
- 137.7 kilometres (85.6 mi) northwest of downtown La Tuque;
- 248 kilometres (154 mi) northwest of the mouth of the Saint-Maurice River (confluence with the Saint Lawrence River at Trois-Rivières).

== Infrastructure ==
The La Loutre dam has two weirs: the one on the right (to the south) and the one on the left (to the north). The forest road crosses at the top of each of the two reels.

Characteristics	Left dam	Right dam
Height	6.5	4.4
Holding capacity	2,827,440 m3	900,000 m3
Height of the restraint	4 m	3.2 m
Length of the book	135 m	50.1 m
Type of dam	Earth	Concrete-gravity
Type of land	Alluvium	Roc
Class	E	E
Consequence level	Minimal	Minimal
Tank area	142.7 ha	142.7 ha
Pushback length	4200 m	4000 m
Average width	287,500 m	339.7 m
Year of construction	1930	1918

== History ==
The project to harness the Saint-Maurice River at Rapides La Loutre became possible thanks to the construction of the second Transcontinental railway line which follows the course of the Saint-Maurice River between La Tuque and Wemotaci, except in the segment between the mouth of the Vermillon River (La Tuque) and the hamlet of Mactavish hamlet on the Reservoir Blanc where the railway line cuts short while the Saint-Maurice River makes a big curve towards the North-East. This line arrived at La Tuque in 1908 and Weymontachie in 1910.

Initially the Fraser Brace Company (of Berlin, New Hampshire, U.S. which will take the name of Brown Corporation in Canada) in charge of the construction works had planned to establish the center of construction operations of the La Loutre dam at Weymontachie on the north shore of the Saint-Maurice River; however, the Hudson's Bay Company refused access to their land citing the risk to the fur herds. Consequently, the general construction contractor set up his site operations center on the south shore of the Saint-Maurice by founding the forest village of "Sanmaur" in 1914. A wharf was built downstream of the Chaudière rapid. Boats were providing supplies between Sanmaur and the rapid Chaudière. A dike was then built between Sanmaur and Weymontachie in order to raise the water level upstream, facilitating the transport by boats and barges of workers, machinery and equipment.

In addition, a section (the "RR track") has been built over the last 35 kilometres (22 mi) leading to the construction site, either from the "Rapides de la Chaudière" where the Saint-Maurice River forms a loop towards east downstream of the mouth of the Petit Rocher River (La Tuque).

Before the construction of the La Loutre dam, the Saint-Maurice River originated at Du Mâle Lake (Gouin Reservoir). Downstream from this source, the former site of the Atikamekw village of Obedjiwan was swallowed up and moved higher up.

== Toponymy ==
This toponym originates from the Rapides La Loutre which the dam flooded.

The toponym "La Loutre dam" was formalized on June 6, 1973, at the Commission de toponymie du Québec.

== See also ==
- Saint-Maurice River, a stream
- Gouin Reservoir, a body of water
- Gouin Dam,
- La Tuque, a town
- List of generating stations in Quebec
