= Sanmaur, Quebec =

Coordinates: 47°53′40″N 73°47′50″W

Sanmaur (a contraction of Saint-Maurice) is a village in the Haute-Mauricie, in La Tuque, in Québec, Canada. Sanmaur was incorporated into the city of La Tuque in 2003.

== History ==
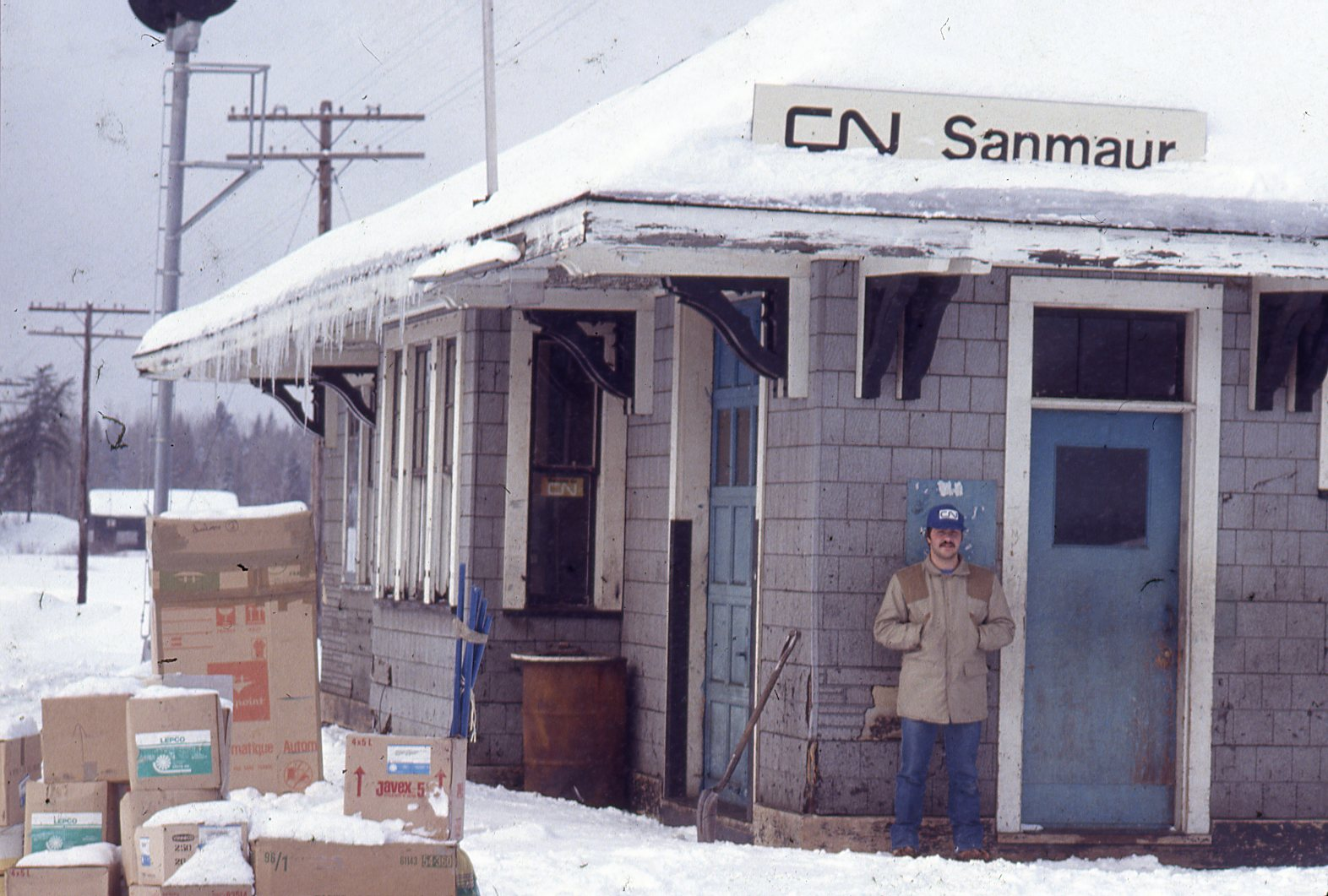
The Sanmaur train station in 1979

This village was established in 1914 by the company responsible for the construction of the La Loutre Dam. Sanmaur was supported in 1940 by the Brown Corporation, a logging company operating in Mauricie.

Sanmaur is located on the banks of the Saint-Maurice River in front of Wemotaci and near the mouth of the Manouane River.

== Geography ==
Sanmaur is located in the forest on the west bank of the Saint-Maurice River in front of Wemotaci and south of the mouth of Manouane River. A bridge spans the Saint-Maurice River, connecting Sanmaur and Wemotaci, built 500 metres (1,600 ft) downstream of an island measuring 2.4 km long and 0.65 km maximum width. This bridge is located 5.5 km upstream of the dam falls Allard.

Sanmaur is located along Forest Road 25, which goes to the west along the south shore of Manouane River (La Tuque). At one kilometer west of Sanmaur, the road linking Parent and Wemotaci crosses a bridge over the Manouane River and joins Route 25.

Sanmaur and Wemotaci are located 65 km (measured by water) downstream of the Gouin Reservoir dam. The latter dam is located 3.8 km (measured by water) upstream of the old La Loutre Dam.

== See also ==
- Saint-Maurice River
- Manouane River (La Tuque)
- La Tuque
- Mauricie
- Obedjiwan, Quebec
- Wemotaci, Quebec
