= Wabano River =

Location
- Country: Canada
- Province: Quebec
- Region: Mauricie

Physical characteristics
- Mouth
  - coordinates: 48°20′34″N 74°02′30″W
- Length: 65 km (40 mi)

The Wabano River flows from north to south, in the Laurentian Mountains in the territory of La Tuque, in Mauricie, the province of Quebec, in Canada. Wabano river drains an area located east of Gouin Reservoir.

== Geography ==
The estimated length of the river is 65 km. The Wabano River has four branches, the most important is the Wabano West River. The river is fed from the west, by including the discharge of lakes Levasseur and Berlinguet. Several lakes of lower throughput and a smaller surface, are feeding the course of the river.

Wabano River is the first tributary of the Saint-Maurice River, just downstream hydroelectric dam Gouin Reservoir. Wabano River flows from north to south sometimes serpentine, fully in forest area. Its mouth is located sixty kilometers north of Wemotaci and Sanmaur .

A forest path goes along the river Wabano, on the west side between the mouth and the first branch of the river (Wabano West River).

== Toponymy ==
Attikamek designated this river under the toponym "Cousapsigan". At the end of the nineteenth century, the river was sometimes called "Rivière de Jonglerie" (River of Juggling); this designation is similar to the word wizard, or the French equivalent of the word "Wabano". In 1824, the explorer and trader Francis Verreault has designated this water body "River Wizard" in his testimony to the House of Assembly of Lower Canada.

The name "Wabano River" was recorded on December 5, 1968, at the Bank of place names in Commission de toponymie du Québec (Geographical Names Board of Québec).

== Also ==
=== See also ===
- Saint-Maurice River
- Gouin Reservoir
- La Tuque
- La Tuque (urban agglomeration)
