= Tamarac River (Gatineau River tributary) =

Tamarac

Location
- Country: Canada
- Province: Quebec
- Regions: Abitibi-Témiscamingue; Mauricie

Physical characteristics
- Source: Tamarac Lake
  - location: Senneterre (Buies Township), Abitibi-Témiscamingue, Quebec
  - coordinates: 48°06′50″N 75°32′36″W
  - elevation: 444 m (1,457 ft)
- Mouth: Gatineau River (via Pain de Sucre Lake)
  - location: La Tuque (Radison Township), Mauricie, Quebec
  - coordinates: 47°53′55″N 75°31′21″W
  - elevation: 402 m (1,319 ft)
- Length: 44.0 km (27.3 mi)

Basin features
- Tributaries
  - left: (upstream); Outlet of lake Goering; outlet of Lake Radisson; outlet of lakes Manny and Murel; outlet of lakes lacs Wimpy and Bambino; outlet of lake Bénito; outlet of lake Ababa; outlet of lake Selassié; outlet of lake Addis; outlet of lakes Réjeanne and Daudin.
  - right: (upstream); Outlet of lakes Bob eandHead; outlet of lake Lemon; outlet of lakes Auger and Delly; outlet of lakes Fagan and Massie; outlet of lakes Joliat, Pete, Harron, Allison and Lyons; outlet of lake Ace; Le Breton Creek; outlet of lake Hayes; outlet of lakes Stevens and Tubit; outlet of lake Citroën; outlet of lake Simon; outlet of lake Mongrain.

The Tamarac River is a tributary of Pain de Sucre Lake (La Tuque), flowing north of the St. Lawrence River, first in Senneterre (MRC of La Vallée-de-l'Or Regional County Municipality, in Abitibi-Témiscamingue and in the territory of La Tuque, in the administrative region of Mauricie, in Quebec, in Canada.

This stream runs entirely in a small valley in forest area. This area is without resort.

The surface of the Tamarac River is generally frozen from the beginning of December until the beginning of April.

== Geography ==
The Tamarac River originates at the mouth of a Tamarac Lake (length: 4.9 kilometres (3.0 mi); altitude: 444 metres (1,457 ft)), in the territory of the city of Senneterre. This lake is located at 134 kilometres (83 mi) east of downtown Senneterre and at 75 kilometres (47 mi) northwest of the center of village of Parent and 22.8 kilometres (14.2 mi) north of the confluence of the Tamarac River.

From the dam at the mouth of Tamarac Lake, the Tamarac River flows over 44.0 kilometres (27.3 mi), according to the following segments:

Upper part of the river (segment of 21.5 kilometres (13.4 mi))

- 2.4 kilometres (1.5 mi) to the east, crossing the northern part of Lake Neault (length: 4.3 kilometres (2.7 mi); altitude: 442 metres (1,450 ft)) up to at its mouth. Note: this lake straddles the townships of Le Breton (west side of the lake) and De Buies (east side);
- 2.1 kilometres (1.3 mi) northeasterly, crossing Lake Dozois (altitude: 442 metres (1,450 ft)) along its entire length, to the mouth. Note: The Canadian National Railway cuts the bottom of a bay on the north side of the lake, where the discharge (coming from the North) of three lakes arrives;
- 6.4 kilometres (4.0 mi) south-east, crossing Lake Canier (altitude: 437 metres (1,434 ft)) on 4.7 kilometres (2.9 mi), to its mouth;
- 3.8 kilometres (2.4 mi) towards the south, to the limit of the canton of Douville;
- 4.0 kilometres (2.5 mi) south, then south-east, crossing Lake Hallé (length: 0.9 kilometres (0.56 mi); altitude: 425 metres (1,394 ft)) on its full length, to its mouth;
- 2.8 kilometres (1.7 mi) southeasterly, then southwesterly across Alexandra Lake (length: 2.0 kilometres (1.2 mi); altitude: 426 metres (1,398 ft)) on 1.1 kilometres (0.68 mi), to its mouth;

Lower part of the river (segment of 22.5 kilometres (14.0 mi))

- 7.1 kilometres (4.4 mi) southwesterly to the boundary of Radisson Township;
- 7.3 kilometres (4.5 mi) southwesterly, crossing Hayes Lake and Primeau Lake (length: ; altitude: 416 metres (1,365 ft)) on its full length, to the dam at its mouth;
- 2.0 kilometres (1.2 mi) to the south, then north-east, to the limit of the canton of Douville;
- 0.7 kilometres (0.43 mi) to the south, forming a curve towards the east in the canton of Douville, to return to cross the limit of the canton of Radisson;
- 5.4 kilometres (3.4 mi) southwesterly, south, then east, to the confluence of the river. Note: A forest road bridge marks the confluence.

The Tamarac River empties into Radisson Township on the west shore of the northern part of Sugarloaf Lake (La Tuque) which is the head lake of the Gatineau River; the latter then pours into the Ottawa River. This confluence of the Tamarac River is located almost at the eastern limit of Radisson Township, at:

- 3.3 kilometres (2.1 mi) north of the mouth of Sugar Loaf Lake, which the current crosses over 5.2 kilometres (3.2 mi) first to East, then to the South;
- 70 kilometres (43 mi) west of the village center of Parent;
- 144 kilometres (89 mi) south-east of downtown Senneterre.

== Toponymy ==
The toponym "Tamarac River" was formalized on December 5, 1968 at the Commission de toponymie du Québec, when it was created.

== See also ==
- La Vallée-de-l'Or Regional County Municipality (RCM)
- Senneterre, a municipality
- La Tuque, a territory equivalent to a RCM
- Pain de Sucre Lake (La Tuque), a lake
- Gatineau River, a watercourse
- Ottawa River, a watercourse
- St. Lawrence River, a watercourse
- List of rivers of Quebec
