= Marmette Lake =

Lake in Reservoir Gouin, in Quebec, Canada

- Location within Quebec
- Location: La Tuque, Mauricie, Quebec, Canada
- Coordinates: 48°38′21″N 74°52′24″W
- Type: Reservoir lake
- Primary inflows: Toussaint Lake, Wapisiw Bay, Eskwaskwakamak Bay,
- Primary outflows: McSweeney Lake
- Max. length: 13.5 kilometres (8.4 mi)
- Max. width: 5.3 kilometres (3.3 mi)
- Surface elevation: 402 metres (1,319 ft) (altitude varying according to the water management of the Gouin dam)

The Lake Marmette is a freshwater body located in the Center-North part of Gouin Reservoir, in the territory of the town of La Tuque (in the South-East of village of Obedjiwan), in the administrative region of Mauricie, in province of Quebec, in Canada.

This lake extends into the townships of Toussaint, McSweeney, Lemay and Marmette.

Recreational tourism activities constitute the main economic activity of the sector because of its strategic position, because pleasure boating must cross this body of water towards the west, by taking the pass located to the south of the eastern tip of the village of Obedjiwan, delimiting the eastern part of Gouin Reservoir. Crossing Toussaint Lake provides access on the south side to Bureau Lake and the western part of Gouin Reservoir via the pass between Kanatakompeak Bay and Aiapew Bay.

The hydrographic slope of lake Marmette is served indirectly on the north side by route 212 connecting the village of Obedjiwan to the east shore of Gouin reservoir; this road provides access to Toussaint Lake and to the various bays on the northeast shore of Gouin Reservoir. A few secondary forest roads have been built on the North-North shore of Gouin Reservoir for logging and recreational activities.

The surface of Marmette Lake is usually frozen from mid-November to the end of April, however safe traffic on the ice is generally from the beginning of December to the end of March. Water management at the Gouin dam can cause significant variations in the water level, particularly at the end of winter when the water is lowered in anticipation of the spring melt.

== Geography ==
Before the end of the construction of La Loutre Dam in 1916, thus creating the Gouin Reservoir, Lake Marmette had a smaller dimension. After the second raising of the Gouin Reservoir in 1948 due to the development of the Gouin Dam, lake Marmette took on its current form.

The main hydrographic slopes near Lac Marmette are:

- north side: Wapisiw Bay, Eskwaskwakamak Bay, Kawawiekamak Lake, Mathieu lake, Toussaint River;
- east side: Piripohonan pass, Kapikakamicik pass, Wacawkak bay, McSweeney Lake, Magnan Lake, Brochu Lake, Kapikakamicik pass;
- south side: Bureau Lake, Nemio River, Mikisiw Amirikanan Lake, Ganipi Bay, Wacekamiw River, Lepage Lake (Wacekamiw);
- west side: Toussaint Lake, Kanatakompeak Bay, Aiapew Bay, Bourgeois Lake, Thibodeau Bay, Lake du Mâle;
- Southwest side: Kokotcew Onikam bay.

With a length of 13.5 kilometres (8.4 mi) and a maximum width of 5.3 kilometres (3.3 mi), Lac Marmette is delimited:

- to the West: by a long peninsula going up towards the North (corresponding to the extension of the eastern shore of Bureau Lake) to a pass with a width of 1.8 kilometres (1.1 mi). The north shore of this pass is located at the eastern point of Obedjiwan. This pass links Lake Marmette to Toussaint Lake;
- in the North: an island with a diameter of 0.9 kilometres (0.56 mi) located 0.3 kilometres (0.19 mi) from the eastern point of Obdejiwan, marking out the southern part of the Wapisiw Bay;
- in the northeast: a narrow (unidentified) island 2.6 kilometres (1.6 mi) in length demarcating the southwestern limit on Kawawiekamak Lake; the Kapikakamicik pass separates this island with another unidentified island (length: 2.0 kilometres (1.2 mi)) further south; to the northeast: a large (unidentified) island with a length of 22.0 kilometres (13.7 mi) (stretching southeast) which is bordered to the north by Kawawiekamak Lake and to the south by McSweeney Lake as well as the northeast part of lake Marmette;
- in the East: by an archipelago whose longest island has a length of 6.2 kilometres (3.9 mi), marking out the northwestern part of McSweeney Lake.

The mouth of Lake Marmette is located east of the lake, where the current crosses the archipelago, either at:

- 4.4 kilometres (2.7 mi) to the south-east of the pass which separates the eastern part of Gouin Reservoir with Toussaint Lake (Center-North part);
- 11.4 kilometres (7.1 mi) East of the pass that separates the western part of Gouin Reservoir (via Aiapew Bay with Toussaint Lake;
- 7.4 kilometres (4.6 mi) east of the village center of Obedjiwan;
- 63 kilometres (39 mi) north-west of Gouin Dam;
- 113.4 kilometres (70.5 mi) north-west of the center of the village of Wemotaci (north bank of the Saint-Maurice River);
- 210 kilometres (130 mi) north-west of downtown La Tuque;
- 307 kilometres (191 mi) northwest of the mouth of the Saint-Maurice River (confluence with the St. Lawrence River at Trois-Rivières).

From the mouth of Lac Marmette, the current flows on 76.8 kilometres (47.7 mi) eastwards, then south-east, up to Gouin Dam, crossing in particular, the McSweeney Lake, Nevers Lake, Brochu Lake and Kikendatch Bay.

From this dam, the current follows the Saint-Maurice River to Trois-Rivières where it flows onto the north shore of the St. Lawrence River.

== Toponymy ==
The toponym "Lac Marmette" was formalized on 18 December 1986 by the Commission de toponymie du Québec.

== See also ==
- Gouin Reservoir, a body of water
- Tcikitinaw Bay, a body of water
- South Marmette Bay, a body of water
- Oasis Island, an island
- List of lakes in Canada
