= Gouin Dam =

Dam on Gouin Reservoir, Quebec, Canada

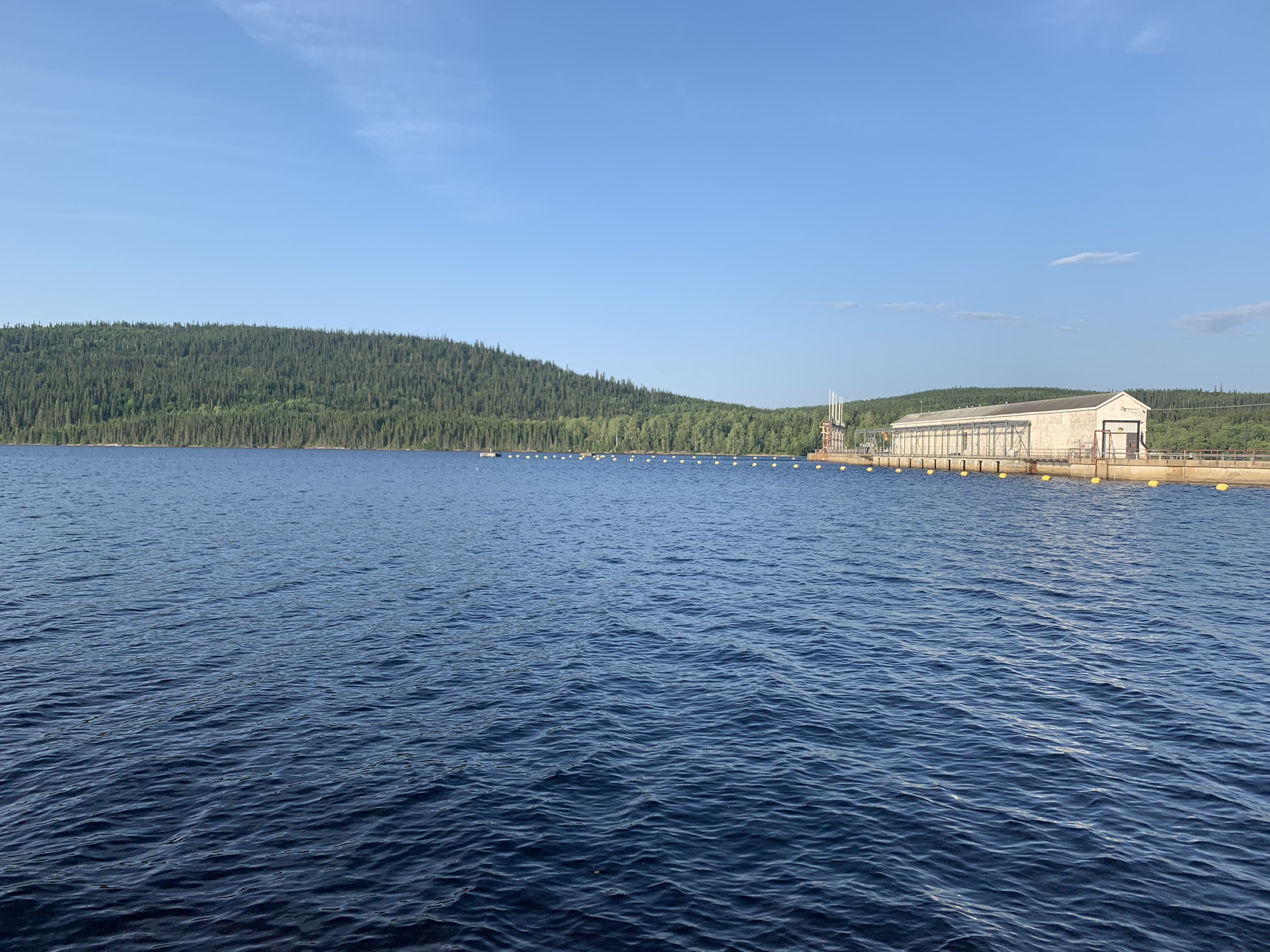

- Location within Quebec
- Country: Canada
- Location: Quebec, Mauricie, La Tuque
- Coordinates: 48.3533°N 74.0991°W
- Opening date: 1948
- Owner: Hydro-Québec

Dam and spillways
- Type of dam: Gravity dam
- Height (foundation): 26
- Length: 502
- Dam volume: 178900

The Gouin dam is a river infrastructure that created the Gouin Reservoir. This dam is the source of the Saint-Maurice River and is located in the town of La Tuque, in Mauricie, in province Quebec, in Canada.

== Toponymy ==
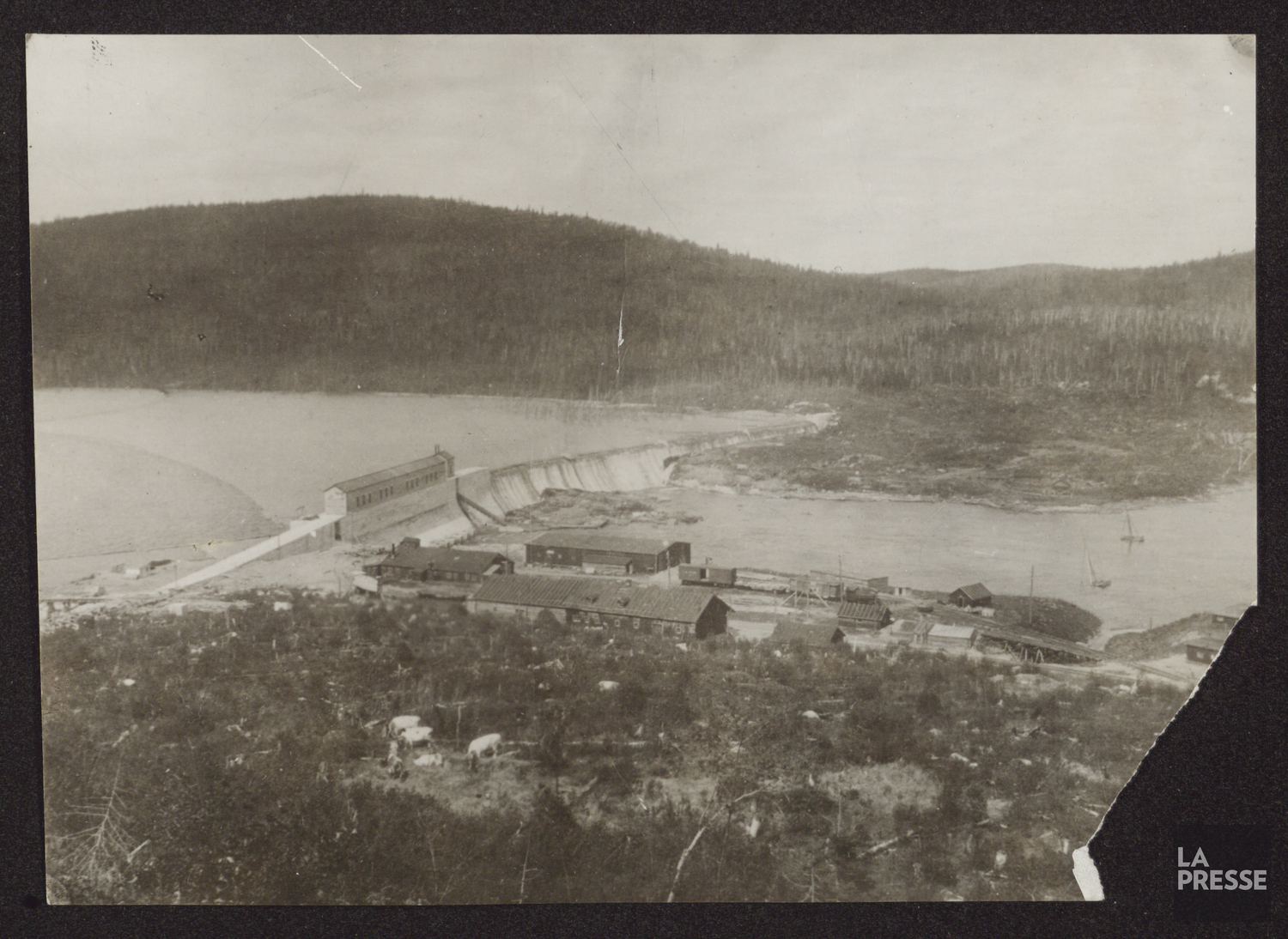
Gouin reservoir and dam at the Saint-Maurice River, sometime after 1918

The Gouin dam owes its name to Lomer Gouin (1861-1929), who was premier of Quebec between 1905 and 1920, federal minister of justice between 1921 and 1924 and Lieutenant Governor of Quebec in 1929.

== Geography ==
The Kikendatch Bay is formed by the Gouin dam which is located at:

- 4.4 km (2.7 mi) west of the mouth of the Wabano River (confluence with the Saint-Maurice River)
- 71.0 km (44.1 mi) south-east of the center of the village of Obedjiwan which is located on a peninsula on the north shore of Gouin Reservoir
- 55.3 km (34.4 mi) north-west of the center of the village of Wemotaci (north shore of the Saint-Maurice River)
- 142 km (88 mi) north-west of downtown La Tuque
- 252 km (157 mi) northwest of the mouth of the Saint-Maurice river (confluence with the St. Lawrence River at Trois-Rivières).

== Infrastructure ==
Completed in 1948, the dam is equipped with a mini-hydroelectric power station fitted with two turbine-generator sets of 300 kW each, in order to meet the needs of the dam itself, of the staff residences of Hydro-Québec assigned to its maintenance and an outfitter located nearby.

- Height of the dam: 26 metres (85 ft)
- Holding capacity: 27,795,000,000 m^{3} (9.816×10^{11} cu ft)
- Height of the reservoir: 24.2 metres (79 ft)
- Length of the structure: 502 metres (1,647 ft)
- Type of dam: Concrete-gravity
- Type of foundation land: Roc. Class: A
- Level of consequences: Considerable
- Seismic zone: 1
- Reservoir area: 142.7 hectares (353 acres)
- Watershed area: 9,473 km^{2} (3,658 sq mi)

== See also ==
- Saint-Maurice River, a stream
- Gouin Reservoir, a body of water
- La Loutre Dam,
- Kikendatch Bay, one pass
- List of dams in Quebec
