= Kikendatch Bay =

Freshwater body of water in La Tuque, Quebec

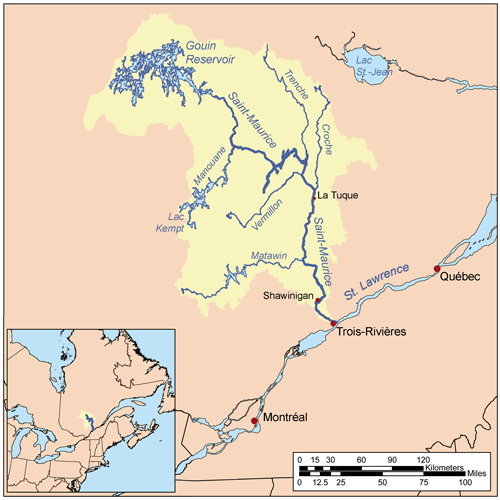
- Watershed of Saint-Maurice River

- Location within Quebec
- Location: La Tuque
- Coordinates: 48°22′17″N 74°10′10″W
- Type: Natural
- Primary inflows: Brochu Lake, Gouin Reservoir
- Primary outflows: Saint-Maurice River (via Gouin Dam)
- Basin countries: Canada
- Max. length: 13.4 kilometres (8.3 mi)
- Max. width: 4.2 kilometres (2.6 mi)
- Surface elevation: 402 metres (1,319 ft)

The Kikendatch Bay is a freshwater body that leads to the Gouin Reservoir, in the territory of La Tuque, in Haute-Mauricie, in the administrative region of Mauricie, in the province of Quebec, in Canada.

This bay is mainly located in the township of Levasseur, except the entrance (west side) of the bay located in the canton of Aubin. Following the erection completed in 1948 of the Gouin Dam, the "Kikendatch Bay" became an extension of Brochu Lake located further north-west, i.e. at the extreme east of Gouin Reservoir.

Recreotourism activities are the main economic activity of the sector. Forestry comes second. A civilian seaplane base is located at the top of the Gouin Dam.

The route 400, connecting the Gouin Dam to the village of Parent, Quebec, serves the southern part of Kikendatch Bay, as well as the valleys of Jean-Pierre River and Leblanc River; this road also serves the peninsula which stretches north in the Gouin Reservoir on 30.1 kilometres (18.7 mi). Some secondary forest roads are in use nearby for forestry and recreational tourism activities.

The surface of Kikendatch Bay is usually frozen from mid-November to the end of April, however, safe ice circulation is generally from early December to late March.

== Geography ==
Barred on the east by the Gouin Reservoir, this bay has a length of 13.4 kilometres (8.3 mi) in the East-West direction resembling a forearm whose hand is oriented towards the East and gripping a mountain whose summit is at 577 metres (1,893 ft). The Gouin Dam is located between this mountain and another (top at 611 metres (2,005 ft)) located opposite 2.8 kilometres (1.7 mi) further south-west. Following the construction of the Gouin Reservoir in 1948, this bay has 36 islands, the largest of which has a length of 2.4 kilometres (1.5 mi).

The northeastern part of Kikendatch Bay has a secondary bay, "baie au Petit Vison" with a rather complex shape and three large islands blocking the entry. This bay is surrounded by mountains.

Thus, Kikendatch Bay is formed by the Gouin Dam which is located at:

- 4.4 kilometres (2.7 mi) west of the mouth of the Wabano River (confluence with the Saint-Maurice River);
- 71.0 kilometres (44.1 mi) south-east of the village center of Obedjiwan, Quebec which is located on a peninsula on the north shore of the Gouin Reservoir;
- 55.3 kilometres (34.4 mi) northwest of the village center of Wemotaci, Quebec (north shore of the Saint-Maurice River);
- 142 kilometres (88 mi) north-west of downtown La Tuque;
- 252 kilometres (157 mi) northwest of the mouth of the Saint-Maurice River (confluence with the St. Lawrence River at Trois-Rivières).

The hydrographic slopes adjacent to "Kikendatch Bay" are:

- north side: Au Vison River, Au Vison River West, Au Vison Bay, Berlinguet Lake, Little Creek;
- east side: Wabano River, Petit Rocher River (La Tuque), Saint-Maurice River;
- south side: Jean-Pierre River (Gouin Reservoir), Noran Creek;
- west side: Jean-Pierre Bay, Brochu Lake, Gouin Reservoir, Bouzanquet Bay.
From this dam, the current flows along the Saint-Maurice River to Trois-Rivières.

== Toponymy ==
This hydronym identifying this bay under the specific "Kikendatch" (graph "Kirkendatch" used in the introduction of Description of surveyed townships ... (1889)) originated the transfer of the name of the trading post that had been established 20 kilometres (12 mi) northwest of the Gouin Dam.

In 1832, the map of Arrowsmith (entitled British North America) identifies this post, as "mission center of Haut-Saint-Maurice" by the priest of Yamachiche, Quebec, Severin-Nicolas Dumoulin (1793–1853), first missionary, in 1837, to visit the population of Atikamekw since the voyage of the father Jacques Buteux in 1651.

In his 1806 diary, Jean-Baptiste Perrault speaks of Kikèndâche. One of his sketches indicates a lake Kikèndàtche. According to Father Georges Lemoine, this name is of Algonquin origin and means where the boiler is and designates a place on the shore where the rock is dug in the form of a boiler. Variant: Baie Martel.

The toponym "Kikendatch Bay" was formalized on December 5, 1968, by the Commission de toponymie du Québec, when it was created.

== See also ==
- Saint-Maurice River
- Gouin Reservoir, a body of water
- La Tuque, a city
