= Obedjiwan =

Obedjiwan Opitciwan
- First Nations reserve
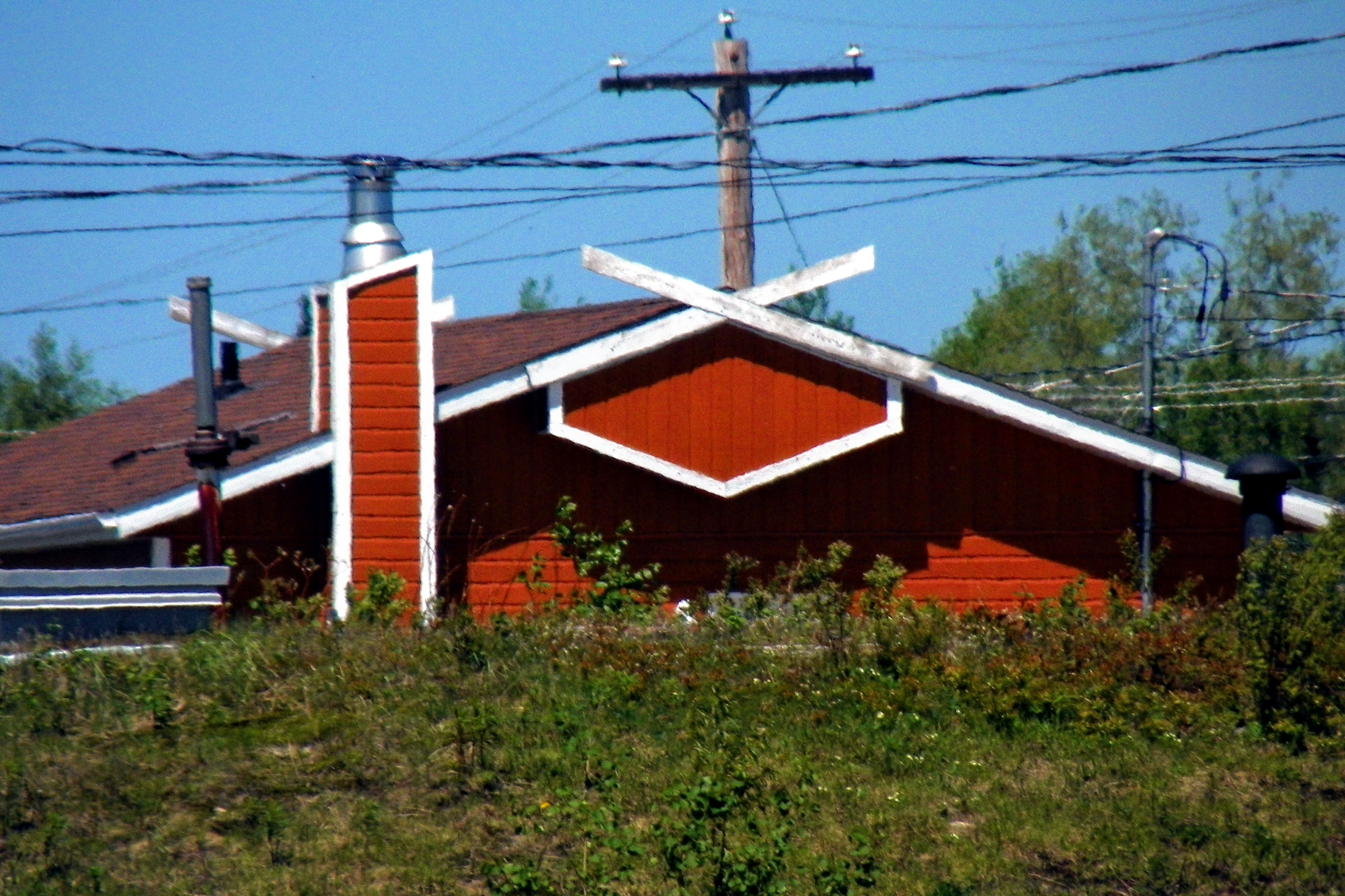
- The roof of an Obedjiwan house

- Location within Central Quebec
- Coordinates: 48°40′14″N 74°55′43″W
- Country: Canada
- Province: Quebec
- Region: Mauricie
- Census division: La Tuque
- Settled: 1825 (trading post)
- Formation: March 21, 1950 (reserve)

Government
  - Chief: Jean-Claude Méquish
  - Federal riding: Saint-Maurice—Champlain
  - Prov. riding: Laviolette

Area
  - Total: 9.27 km^{2} (3.58 sq mi)
  - Land: 8.26 km^{2} (3.19 sq mi)

Population (2021)
  - Total: 1,991
  - Density: 241.1/km^{2} (624/sq mi)
- Time zone: UTC-5 (EST)
  - Summer (DST): UTC-4 (EDT)
- Postal Code: G0W 3B0
- Area code: 819
- Website: www.opitciwan.ca

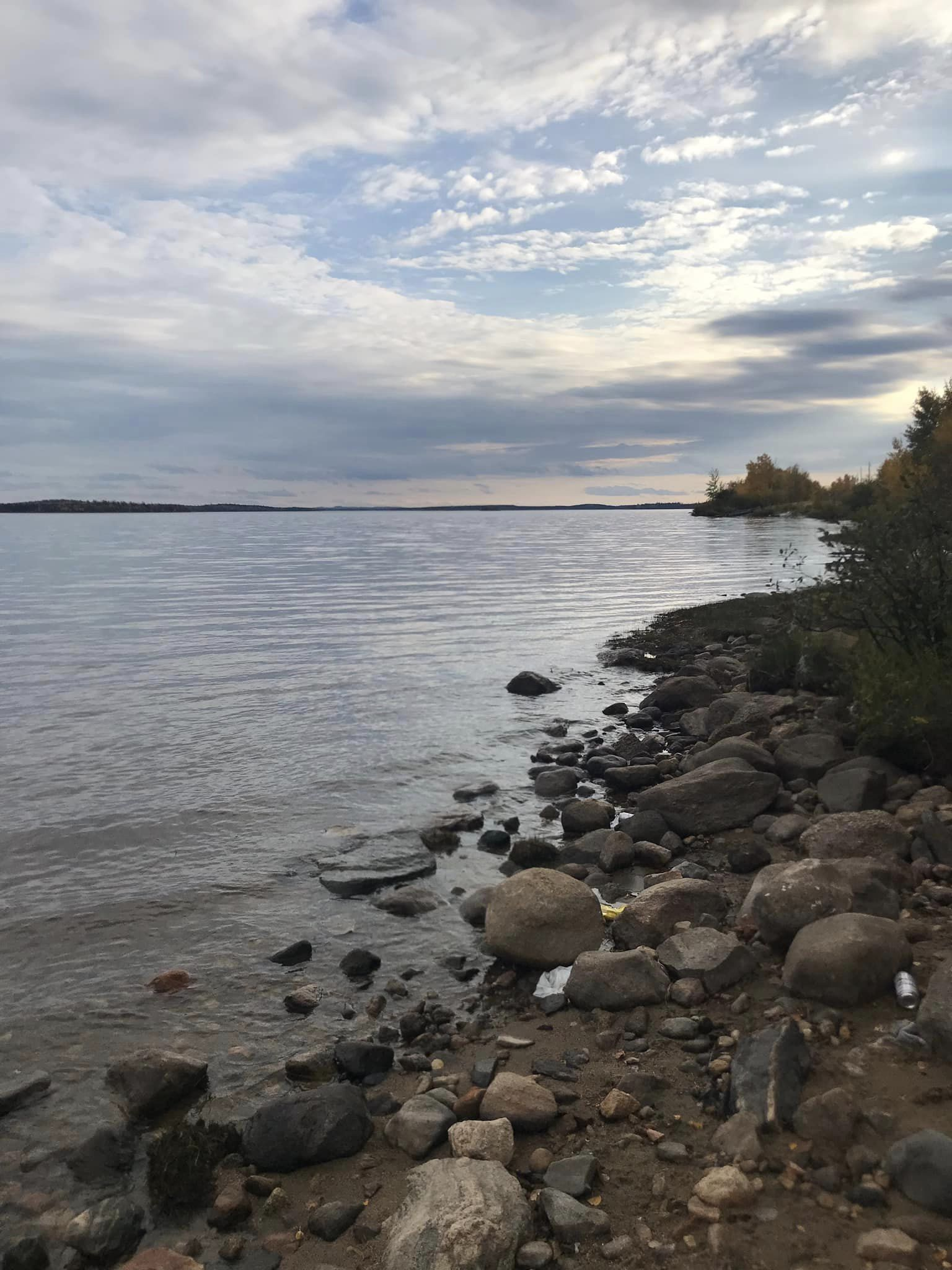
Vue sur le réservoir Gouin - Obedjiwan, Quebec

Obedjiwan (officially designated as Obedjiwan 28) is a First Nations reserve and village on the north shore of Gouin Reservoir in the Mauricie region of Quebec, Canada. It belongs to the Atikamekw of Opitciwan band of the Atikamekw Nation.

== Geography ==
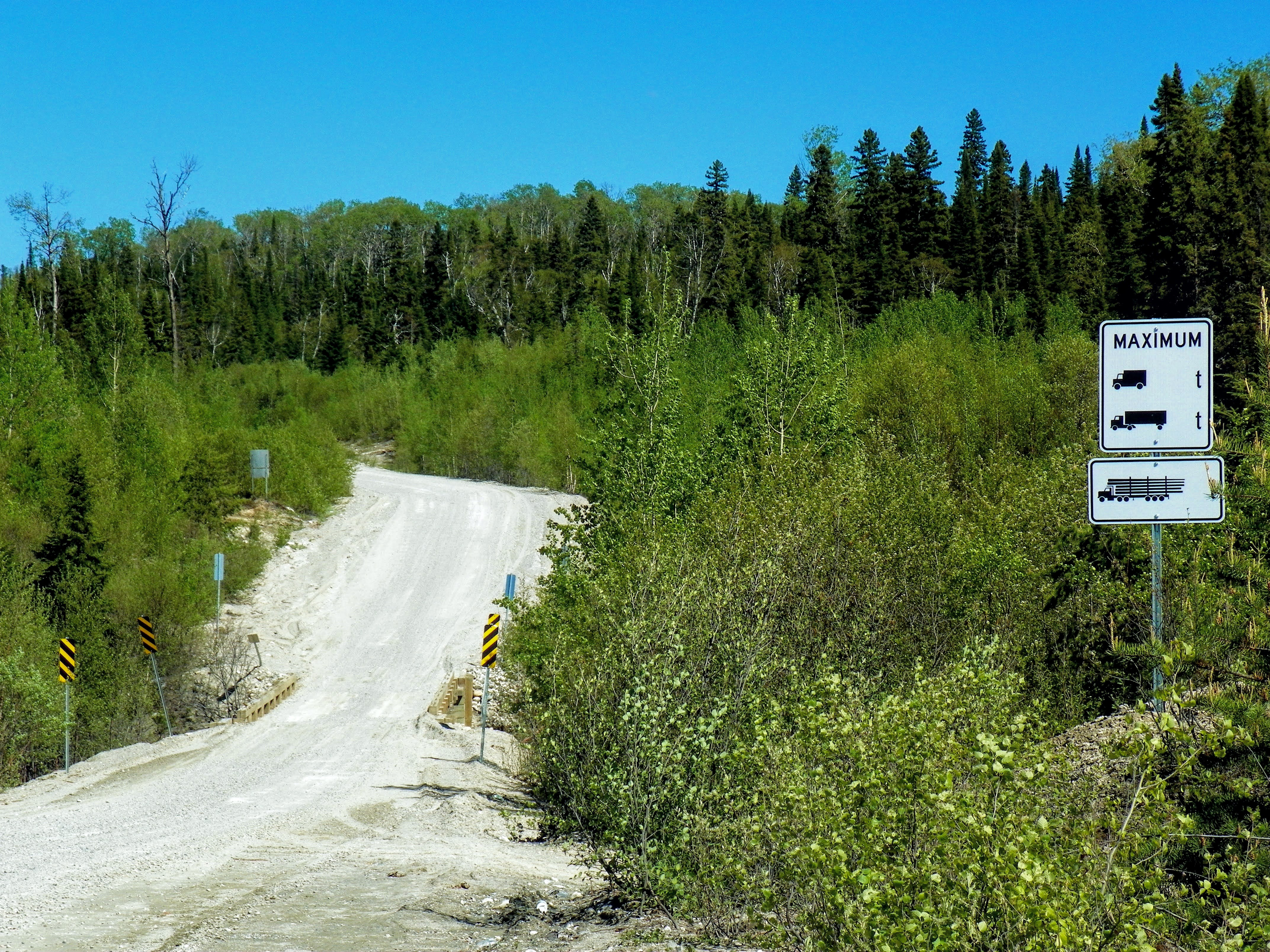
Route 1046 north of Obedjiwan

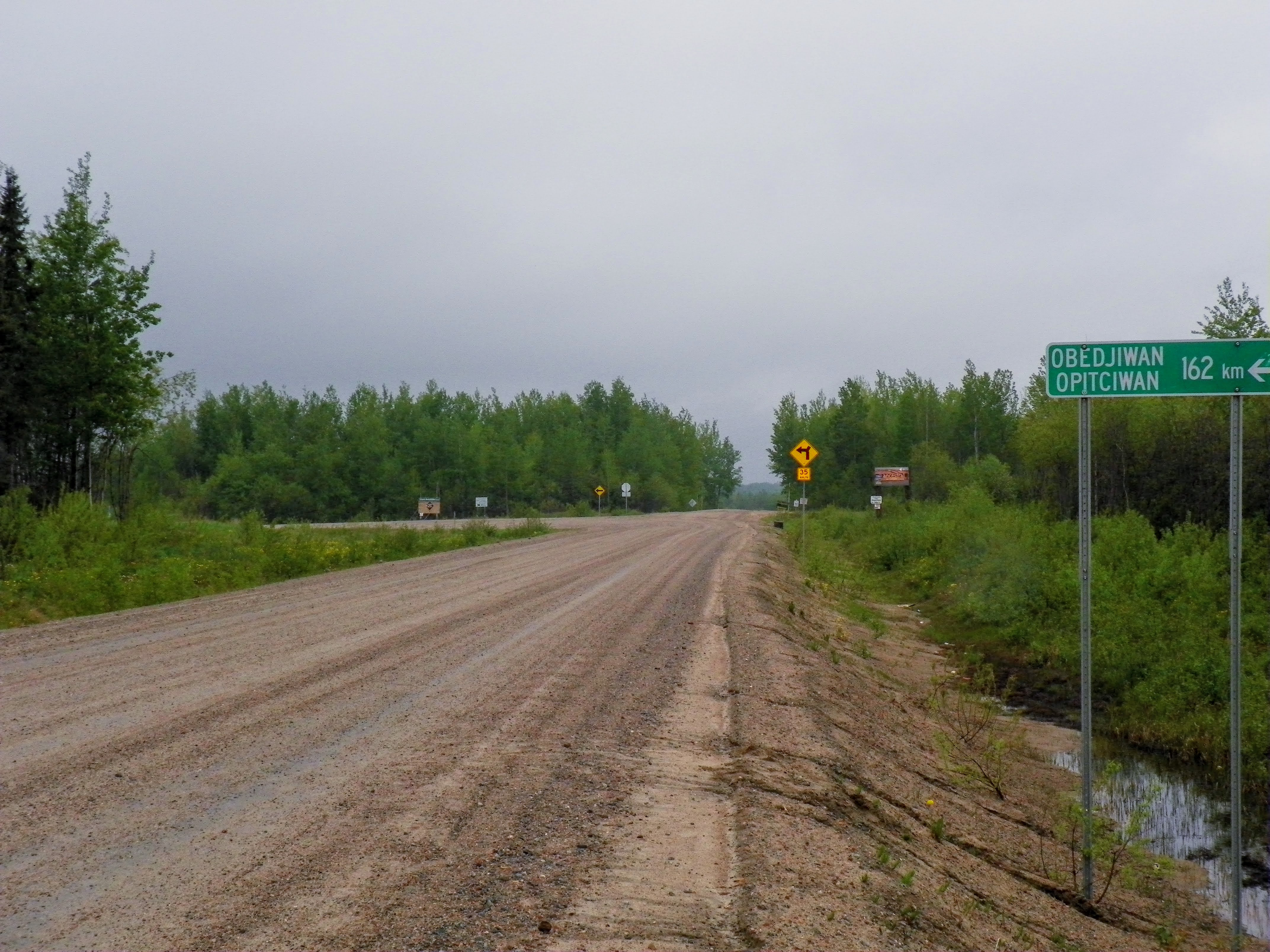
Forest road 0212 en route to Obedjiwan

Obedjiwan reserve is situated on the north shore of Gouin Reservoir, at 143 kilometres (89 mi) (direct line) south of Chibougamau, 118 kilometres (73 mi) north of Wemotaci and 217 kilometres (135 mi) northwest of La Tuque. The reserve is located between Lake Kamitcikamac (west) and Wopisiw Bay (East). In front (south side), there is the tip Martel Kiwam jutting into the lake Mamette.

The reserve is an enclave within the City of La Tuque. It is the most isolated Atikamekw reserve in Quebec. It is accessible by a long gravel forest road of 146 kilometres (91 mi), which reaches towards the east Quebec Route 167 linking Saint-Félicien to Chibougamau. Hence the distance by road to reach Chibougamau is 124 kilometres (77 mi). From Obedjiwan, Forest road 1045 reaches westward Forest Road 1009, built in the north–south axis to circumvent the Gouin Reservoir to the west; this road goes up to Chapais. The road distance between Obedjiwan and La Tuque is 319 km (198 mi), with a forest road bypassing the Gouin Reservoir on the east side. Toward West, the distance Obedjiwan-Senneterre is 260 kilometres (160 mi). In this context of distance, the aircraft is a mode of transportation widely used.

== Etymology ==
The word Obedjiwan, written in the standardized Atikamekw spelling as Opitciwan, comes from the roots oba or obe meaning "strait", and djwan meaning "running". So, it can be translated as "current of the strait/narrows/pass".

The name, first attributed to the lake, has undergone many spelling variations. In 1825, when the Hudson's Bay Company set up a post, they called it Waupatchinauganiskau, which is understood to be the original form of the toponym. In 1871, explorer John P. Bignell visited the place and made mention of the name Obidjouan. In 1904, the Fifth Report of the Geographic Board of Canada called it Obiduan and this remained the accepted form until 1964. Other variations included Obijuan and Wabijiwoine.

== History ==
The area of the upper Saint-Maurice River had long been the homeland of the Atikamekw indigenous people. Lake Obedjiwan (a lake at the headwaters of the Saint-Maurice River that was inundated during the construction of Gouin Reservoir) was located along important canoe routes to Lac Saint-Jean via Lake Necouba (Lac Nicabau) and to James Bay. In the 17th century, and perhaps since prehistoric times, the shores of this lake were a gathering and trading place for the Atikamekw, as well as other indigenous people of surrounding areas, where they engaged in social, economic, and cultural interaction. The Atikamekw procured wheat, flour, and perhaps firearms from the Hurons, in exchange for moose or beaver skins.

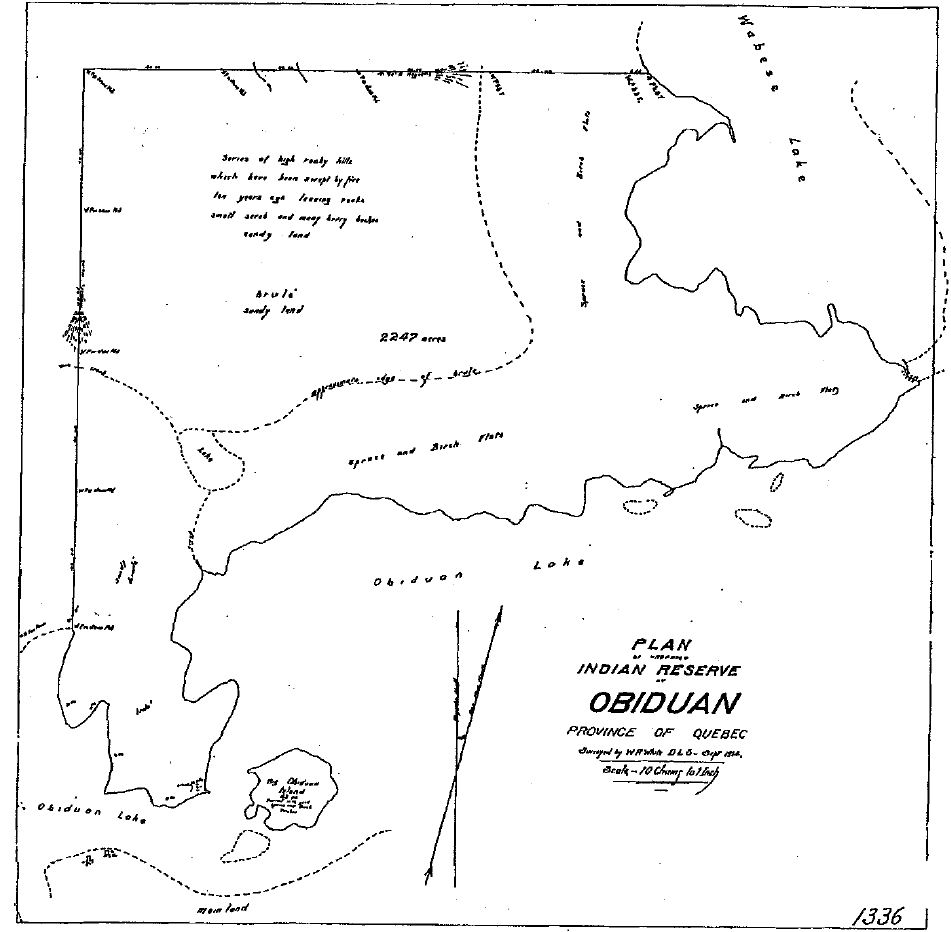
Map of the planned Indian Reserve of Obijuan (Obedjiwan) in 1914

In 1825, the Hudson's Bay Company (HBC) and the King's Posts Company established trading posts on Lake Obedjiwan, that quickly attracted indigenous hunters not only from the area, but also from the eastern James Bay and the upper Ottawa River regions. In 1840, the Hudson's Bay Company deserted Lake Obedjiwan and settled at Kikendatch Lake (now Kikendatch Bay at the outlet of Gouin Reservoir). Yet in 1911, the HBC transferred its Kikendatch Post back to Lake Obedjiwan, causing the Atikamekw also to return to the area. The HBC wanted to move away from competing dealers who undermined its trade at Kikendatch while the Atikamekw liked to avoid Europeans who became more and more numerous in the south. At that time, there was still no real settlement although the Oblates built a chapel in 1916, which was located on the left bank of the Saint-Maurice River opposite of the HBC Post, separated by the Obedjiwan Narrows.

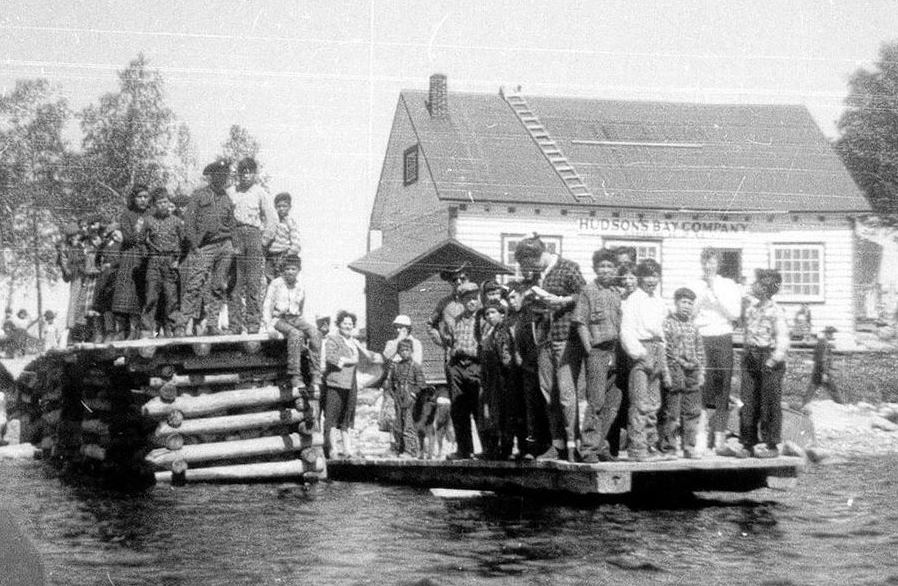
Atikamekw, HBC, Lake Obedjiwan

The area experienced a great change when the dam at La Loutre was constructed in 1917. The reservoir forming behind the dam flooded not only hundreds of lakes, including Lake Obediwan, but also the old settlement and its archaeological sites. A new village, 3 kilometers (1.9 miles) west at the current location, was not actually built until 1925 following arduous negotiations with the Commission des eaux courantes.

On December 31, 1941, the Quebec Government proclaimed the Lands and Forests Act that provided for the reservation of lands for the benefit of "Indians". On January 14, 1944, an area of 2,290 acres (9.3 km^{2}) in the geographic township of Toussaint was transferred from the Government of Quebec to the Government of Canada, and was officially established as the "Obiduan Indian Reserve" on March 21, 1950. It was renamed to "Obedjiwan Indian Reserve" on January 23, 1964.

In 2002, the Atikamekw of Opitciwan initiated claims with the government of Canada in order to get compensated for the land and the goods lost in the flooding, the delay in the creation of the reserve, and the inadequate size of the reserve created. The claims are still ongoing.

=== Land history ===
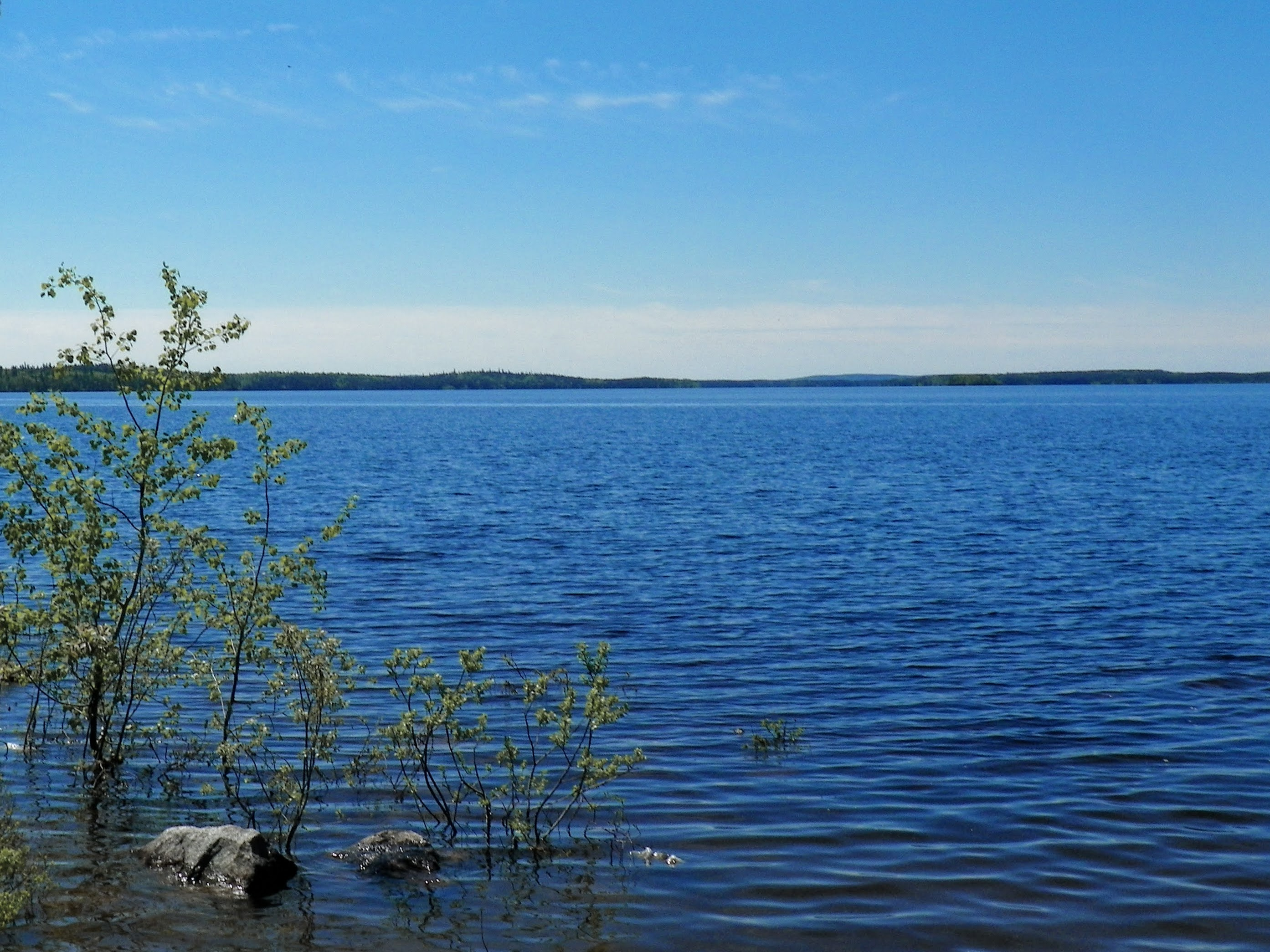
Gouin reservoir circles the village.

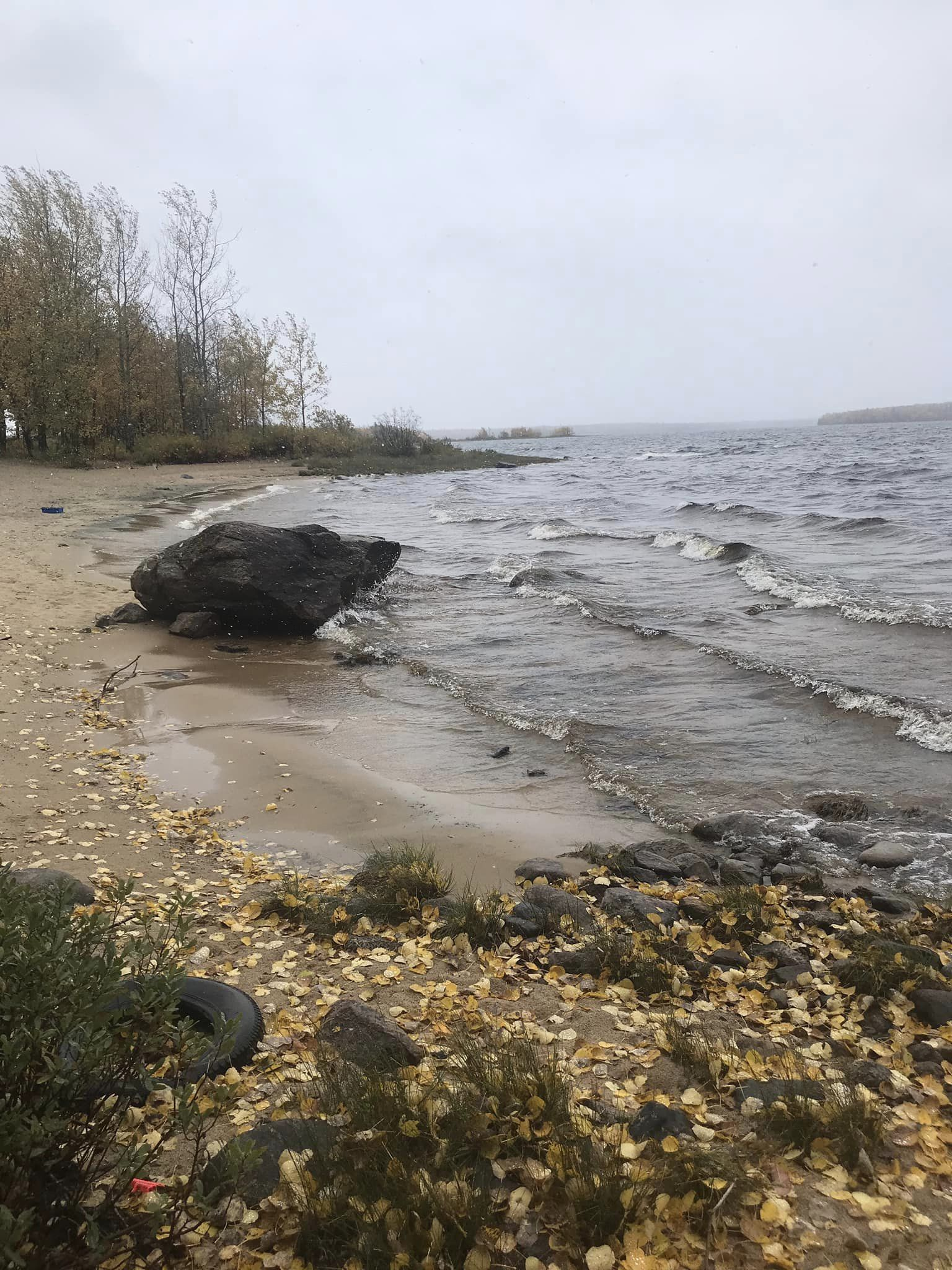
Obedjiwan Lake

- 1941-12-31: Act of 1941, reservation lands not exceeding 133,550 hectares (330,000 acres) for the benefit of Indians by the transfer of the usufruct.
- 1943-10-27: Surveying land for reserve Obedjiwan, Canton Toussaint (projected), Block A. Area: 926.72 hectares (2,290.0 acres).
- 1944-01-14: Order in Council 160, transfer of the management and administration of the Government of Quebec to Government of Canada. Canton Toussaint (projected), Block A. Area: 926.72 hectares (2,290.0 acres).
- 1950-03-21: Order in Council no. 1458, set aside the block acquired (1944) by Government of Canada to the use of Indians.

Current situation

- Canton Toussaint (projected), Block A, acquired under the Act of 1941. Transfer governance and administration of Government of Quebec to Government of Canada, by Order in Council 160 (1944-01-14). Area: 926.72 hectares (2,290.0 acres)

== Demographics ==
Canada census – Obedjiwan community profile

	2021	2011
Population	1,991 (-1.4% from 2016)	2031 (14.0% from 2006)
Land area	8.26 km^{2} (3.19 sq mi)	8.68 km^{2} (3.35 sq mi)
Population density	241.1/km^{2} (624/sq mi)	234.1/km^{2} (606/sq mi)
Median age	23.2 (M: 22.8, F: 23.4)	20.7 (M: 20.3, F: 21.4)
Private dwellings	425 (total)	463 (total)
Median household income

References: 2021 2011

Historic populations:

- Population in 2016: 2019
- Population in 2011: 2031
- Population in 2006: 1782
- Population in 2001: 1666
- Population in 1996: 1464
- Population in 1991: 1125

=== Language ===
Atikamekw language is still spoken by the vast majority of families, and therefore it is among the indigenous languages least threatened with extinction according to some studies. The language has some similarities with the Cree language spoken by the Cree communities of southern Quebec (Waswanipi and Oujé-Bougoumou). This parallel development of both languages may be the result of the frequent interaction between the nearby Cree and Atikamekw. The second language used in Obedjiwan is French.

Mother tongue:

- English: 0%
- French: 2.5%
- Atikamekw: 97.0%
- Other: 0.5%

== See also ==
- Coucoucache, uninhabited Indian reserve
- Wemotaci, Indian reserve
