= Wemotaci =

- First Nations reserve
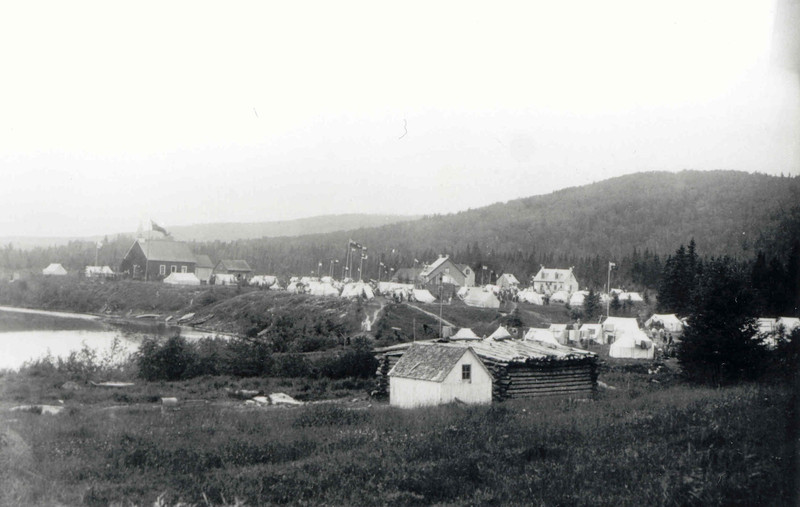
- Weymontachie, 1913

- Location within Quebec
- Coordinates: 47°54′25″N 73°47′00″W
- Country: Canada
- Province: Quebec
- Region: Mauricie
- Census division: La Tuque
- Settled: 1806 (trading post)
- Founded: 1853 (reserve)

Government
  - Chief: Francois Neashish
  - Federal riding: Saint-Maurice—Champlain
  - Prov. riding: Laviolette

Area
  - Total: 33.30 km^{2} (12.86 sq mi)
  - Land: 31.55 km^{2} (12.18 sq mi)

Population (2021)
  - Total: 1,142
  - Density: 36.2/km^{2} (94/sq mi)
- Time zone: UTC-5 (EST)
  - Summer (DST): UTC-4 (EDT)
- Postal Code: G0X 3R0
- Area code: 819
- Website: www.wemotaci.com

Wemotaci (designated as Weymontachie 23 until 1997) is a First Nations reserve on the north shore of the Saint-Maurice River at the mouth of the Manouane River in the Mauricie region of Quebec, Canada. Together with the Obedjiwan and the Coucoucache Indian Reserve No. 24, it belongs to the Atikamekw First Nation.

The reserve, an enclave within the city of La Tuque, is bordered to the west and south by the Saint-Maurice River, whereas its eastern boundary is about 3.8 kilometres (2.4 mi) long, and its northern boundary is 7.8 kilometres (4.8 mi). It is accessible by gravel road from La Tuque's town centre through the hamlet of Sanmaur that is on the opposite shore of the Saint-Maurice River. Also at this location, the Canadian National Railway crosses the river and has a siding at Sanmaur.

== Economy ==
The local economy is based on the art and craft, shops and services, forestry, trapping, construction, tourism, transport and outfitters.

== Etymology ==
Like many other native names, Wemotaci underwent many spelling variations over time. The oldest reference to the toponym is from 1724. In 1827, it was written as Montachene, and in 1829 as Weymontachinque, in 1830 as Waimootansking, in 1832 as Weymontachingue and Warmontashingen, in 1837 as Warmontaching. The 1932 spelling of Weymontachingue on the map of John Arrowsmith became the most common form until 1986, when it was replaced by Weymontachie, as demanded by the local band council. The standardized writing of the Atikamekw language spells it as Wemotaci, which was made official in March 1997.

== History ==
The area of the upper Saint-Maurice River had long been the homeland and hunting grounds of the Atikamekw indigenous people. Some sources claim that the North West Company had already established a trading post at this place between 1770 and 1780, but this remains doubtful. Confirmation of the existence of a trading post at Wemotaci came in 1806, when Jean-Baptiste Perrault built the first structures for fur trading. In 1821, the post was taken over by the Hudson's Bay Company.

In 1851, the Government enacted the allotment of 230,000 acres (930 km^{2}) of land as reserves for the use and benefit of the "Indian" tribes residing in Lower Canada. Two years later, these lands were distributed among the Atikamekw, Algonquins, and Abenakis by John Rolph, Commissioner of Crown Lands. On August 9, 1853, this was made official by the Governor General in Council.

But the Atikamekw didn't give up their nomadic life and settle on the reserve. And it wasn't until 1895 that the reserve was surveyed. The construction of a dam and the National Transcontinental Railway led to the growth of the Sanmaur settlement, which in turn attracted the Atikamekw to the reserve at the beginning of the 20th century. In 1939 however, the Hudson's Bay Company left Weymontachingue and due to lack of funding for maintenance of the village, its population stopped growing after 1950, when its inhabitants began to leave and settled either in Sanmaur or in other nearby villages.

In the 1970s, the village revitalized. A new village was built closer to its namesake mountain. In 1971, the Federal Government bought the lands of the Hudson's Bay Company and these were subsequently added to the reserve.

In May 2010, many residents of Wemotaci were evacuated as a forest fire threatened their homes.

== Demographics ==
Canada census – Wemotaci community profile

	2016	2011
Population	1213 (1.6% from 2011)	1194 (11.3% from 2006)
Land area	31.02 km^{2} (11.98 sq mi)	31.02 km^{2} (11.98 sq mi)
Population density	38.5/km^{2} (100/sq mi)	38.5/km^{2} (100/sq mi)
Median age	23.1 (M: 23.2, F: 22.8)	20.3 (M: 20.4, F: 20.3)
Private dwellings	305 (total)	347 (total)
Median household income

References: 2016 2011

Historic populations:

- Population in 2016: 1213
- Population in 2001: 1042
- Population in 1996: 856
- Population in 1991: 708

Mother tongue:

- English: 0%
- French: 3.4%
- Atikamekw: 96.2%
- Other: 0.4%

== Education ==
There are two schools on the reserve:

- École Seskitin, Pre-Kindergarten to Secondary grade 1
- École Waratinak Nikanik, grades Secondary 1 to Secondary 5

== See also ==
- Sanmaur, Quebec
- Manouane River (La Tuque)
