= Mistatikamekw River =

Mistatikamekw
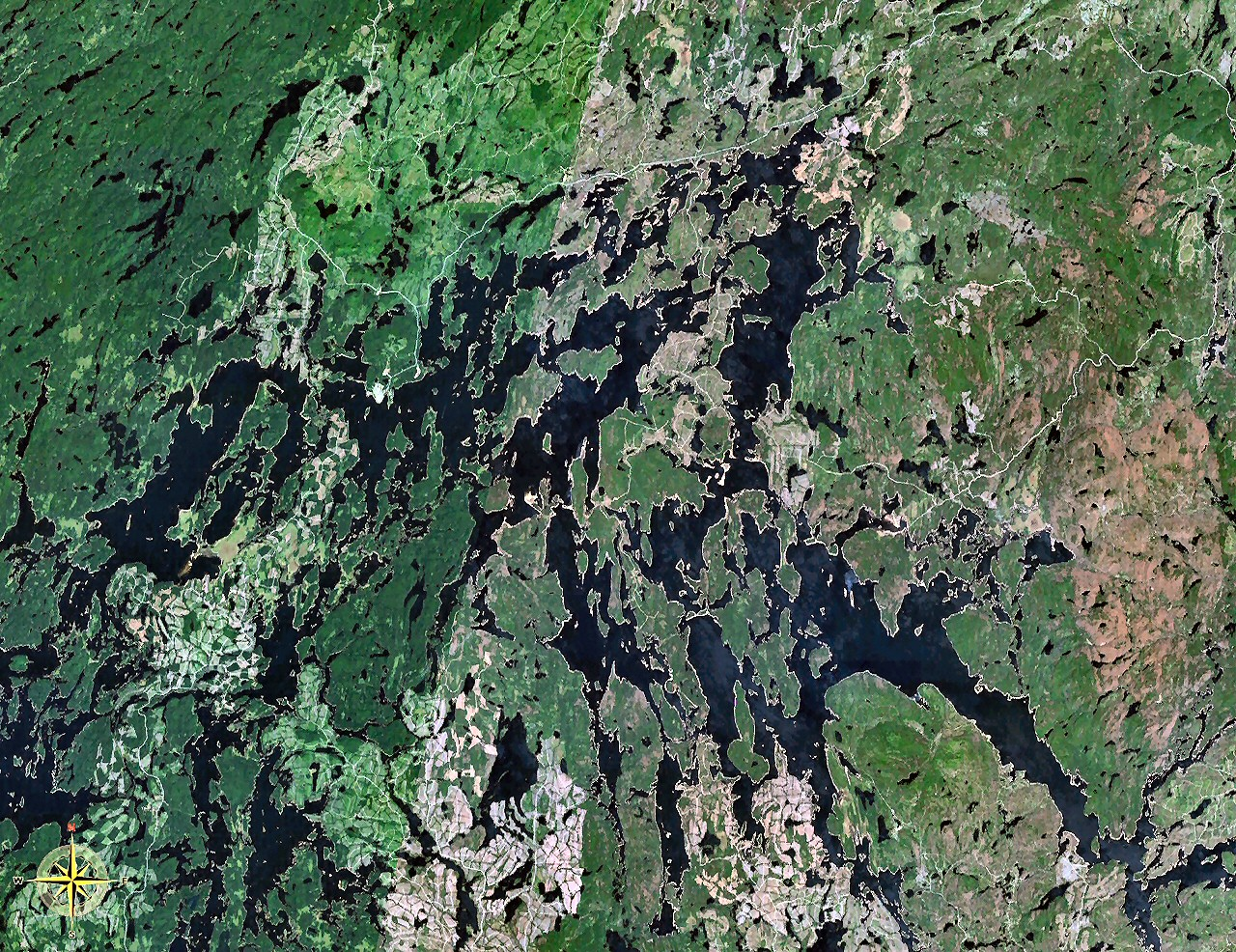
- Map of Saint-Maurice River watershed

Location
- Country: Canada
- Province: Quebec
- Region: Mauricie

Physical characteristics
- Source: Unidentified Lake
  - location: La Tuque (Tassé Township), Mauricie, Quebec
  - coordinates: 48°10′01″N 74°51′51″W
  - elevation: 454 m (1,490 ft)
- Mouth: Bureau Lake (South Bay)
  - location: La Tuque (Achintre Township), Mauricie, Quebec
  - coordinates: 48°12′02″N 75°07′31″W
  - elevation: 405 m (1,329 ft)
- Length: 35.5 km (22.1 mi)

The Mistatikamekw River is a tributary of the Oskélanéo River which flows into the South Bay of Bureau Lake (Gouin Reservoir), flowing into the town of La Tuque, in the administrative region of Mauricie, in Quebec, in Canada.

The Mistatikamekw river flows successively into the townships of Tassé, Montpetit, Faucher and Achintre. Forestry is the main economic activity of this valley; recreational tourism activities, second.

The route 404, connecting the village of Clova, Quebec with the South Bay of Bureau Lake (Gouin Reservoir) also serves the upper part of the river Wistatikamekw; this road connects to the south-east the route 400 which goes to Gouin Dam. Some secondary forest roads are in use nearby for forestry and recreational tourism activities.

The surface of the Mistatikamekw River is usually frozen from mid-November to the end of April, however, safe ice circulation is generally from early December to late March.

== Geography ==
The hydrographic slopes adjacent to the Mistatikamekw River are:
- north side: Oskélanéo River, Benjamin Lake, Bureau Lake (Gouin Reservoir), Nemio River, Saraana Bay;
- east side: Benjamin Lake, Dugré Lake, De La Galette River (Gouin Reservoir);
- south side: Parker Lake, Bazin River, Douville River, Gosselin River;
- west side: Oskélanéo Lake, Oskélanéo River, Tessier Lake (Gouin Reservoir), Flapjack River.

The Mistatikamekw River originates at the mouth of an unidentified lake (length: 1.3 kilometres (0.81 mi), altitude: 454 metres (1,490 ft)), located north-west of Lac Dugré. The mouth of this head lake is located at:

- 19.3 kilometres (12.0 mi) east of the mouth of the Mistatikamekw River (confluence with the Oskélanéo River);
- 21.9 kilometres (13.6 mi) south-east of the mouth of Oskélanéo Lake (confluence with Bureau Lake (Gouin Reservoir);
- 54.6 kilometres (33.9 mi) south-east of the village center of Obedjiwan, Quebec (located on a peninsula on the north shore of Gouin Reservoir);
- 25.5 kilometres (15.8 mi) north-east of the village center of Oskélanéo;
- 60.7 kilometres (37.7 mi) southwest of Gouin Dam erected at the mouth of the Gouin Reservoir (confluence with the Saint-Maurice River).

From the mouth of the head lake, the course of the Mistatikamekw River flows over 35.5 kilometres (22.1 mi) according to the following segments:

- 3.1 kilometres (1.9 mi) southwesterly to the limit of Montpetit township;
- 13.5 kilometres (8.4 mi) southwesterly in Montpetit Township to an unidentified stream (from the South), the closest point to the Canadian National Railway;
- 15.5 kilometres (9.6 mi) northwesterly to the easterly limit of the Township of Faucher;
- 1.5 kilometres (0.93 mi) northwesterly in the Township of Faucher;
- 1.9 kilometres (1.2 mi) northwesterly in Achintre township, crossing Lake Cantons (elevation: 405 metres (1,329 ft)) to the mouth of the river.

The mouth of the Mistatikamekw River is located at:

- 11.4 kilometres (7.1 mi) north of the village of Oskélanéo which is located along the Canadian National Railway, on the west shore of Oskélanéo Lake;
- 6.9 kilometres (4.3 mi) south-east of the mouth of the Oskélanéo River;
- 41.2 kilometres (25.6 mi) south of the mouth of the Bureau Lake (Gouin Reservoir);
- 52.3 kilometres (32.5 mi) south of the village center of Obedjiwan, Quebec which is located on a peninsula on the north shore of the Gouin Reservoir;
- 79.6 kilometres (49.5 mi) south-west of Gouin Dam;
- 105 kilometres (65 mi) west of the village center of Wemotaci, Quebec (north shore of the Saint-Maurice River);
- 193 kilometres (120 mi) north-west of downtown La Tuque.

The mouth of the Mistatikamekw River merges with the Oskélanéo River. From there, the current runs on 145.5 kilometres (90.4 mi) until Gouin Dam, according to the following segments:

- 8.9 kilometres (5.5 mi) north to the South Bay of Bureau Lake (Gouin Reservoir);
- 43.8 kilometres (27.2 mi) north, to the mouth of Bureau Lake (Gouin Reservoir);
- 92.8 kilometres (57.7 mi) towards the North-East, crossing the Marmette Lake, then towards the South-East crossing in particular the Brochu Lake and the Kikendatch Bay until Gouin Dam.
From this dam, the current flows along the Saint-Maurice River to Trois-Rivières.

== Toponymy ==
The hydronym "Mistatikamekw" is of autochthonous origin.

The toponym "Mistatikamekw River" was formalized on September 3, 1981, at the Commission de toponymie du Quebec.

== See also ==
- Saint-Maurice River
- Gouin Reservoir, a body of water
- Kikendatch Bay, a body of water
- Brochu Lake, a body of water
- Nevers Lake, a body of water
- McSweeney Lake, a body of water
- Marmette Lake, a body of water
- Bureau Lake (Gouin Reservoir), a body of water
- Oskélanéo River, a watercourse
- La Tuque, a city
- List of rivers of Quebec
