= Faucher River =

River in Quebec, Canada

Faucher

Location
- Country: Canada
- Province: Quebec
- Region: Mauricie

Physical characteristics
- Source: Unidentified Lake
  - location: La Tuque (Buies Township), Mauricie, Quebec
  - coordinates: 48°09′36″N 75°23′01″W
  - elevation: 436 m (1,430 ft)
- Mouth: Tessier Lake (Gouin Reservoir)
  - location: La Tuque (Faucher Township), Mauricie, Quebec
  - coordinates: 48°09′34″N 75°15′44″W
  - elevation: 407 m (1,335 ft)
- Length: 30.9 km (19.2 mi)

Basin features
- Tributaries
  - left: (upstream); Outlet of lake Laine; outlet of lakes Brignolet, Du Souvenir and an unidentified lake; outlet of lake Foligné.
  - right: (upstream); Outlet of lakes Grégoire and Bridge; outlet of lake Lincy; outlet of lake Dora.

The Faucher River is a tributary of Tessier Lake (Gouin Reservoir) located on the southwestern side of the Gouin Reservoir. This river runs in the town of La Tuque, in the administrative region of Mauricie, in Quebec, in Canada.

The Faucher River flows successively into the townships of Buies, Provancher and Faucher. Forestry is the main economic activity of this valley; recreational tourism activities, secondly thanks to the Canadian National Railway which passes on the south shore of Tessier Lake (Gouin Reservoir) and on the South shore of Lac Duchamp where the village of Clova, Quebec.

The route 404, connecting the village of Clova, Quebec to the South Bay of Bureau Lake (Gouin Reservoir) serves the south of Lake Duchamp and the West of Tessier Lake (Gouin Reservoir); this road connects to the south-east the road 400 which goes to Gouin Dam. Some secondary forest roads are in use nearby for forestry and recreational tourism activities.

The surface of the Faucher River is usually frozen from mid-November to the end of April, however, safe ice circulation is generally from early December to late March.

== Geography ==
The surrounding hydrographic slopes of the Faucher River are:
- north side: Gouin Reservoir, Mattawa Bay, Flapjack River, Adolphe-Poisson Bay, Saraana Bay;
- east side: Tessier Lake (Gouin Reservoir), Oskélanéo River, Oskélanéo Lake, Mistatikamekw River;
- south side: Snow Lake, Brouillard Lake, Clova River, Aux Bleuets River, Tamarac River (Gatineau River);
- west side: Bull Lake, Tamarac River (Gatineau River), Flapjack River, Provancher Creek, Mégiscane River.

The Faucher River originates at the mouth of an unidentified lake (length: 1.9 kilometres (1.2 mi) altitude: 436 metres (1,430 ft)) surrounded by marshes. The mouth of this head lake is located at:

- 6.0 kilometres (3.7 mi) northwest of the village center of Clova, Quebec;
- 10.3 kilometres (6.4 mi) west of the mouth of the Faucher River;
- 15.9 kilometres (9.9 mi) south-west of the mouth of Tessier Lake (Gouin Reservoir);
- 22.3 kilometres (13.9 mi) South of the mouth of the Tessier Lake (Gouin Reservoir) outlet;
- 38.6 kilometres (24.0 mi) south of the mouth of the Saraana Bay;
- 65.3 kilometres (40.6 mi) south-west of the village center of Obedjiwan, Quebec (located on a peninsula on the north shore of Gouin Reservoir);
- 97.8 kilometres (60.8 mi) southwest of the Gouin dam erected at the mouth of the Gouin Reservoir (confluence with the Saint-Maurice River).

From the mouth of the head lake, the course of the Faucher River flows over 30.9 kilometres (19.2 mi) according to the following segments:

- 2.5 kilometres (1.6 mi) to the south, in particular crossing Baril Lake (length: 2.7 kilometres (1.7 mi); altitude: 425 metres (1,394 ft)) to its mouth;
- 5.6 kilometres (3.5 mi) southerly to the outlet (from the southwest) of Lake Gregoire, then easterly to the west shore of Lake Duchamp;
- 5.3 kilometres (3.3 mi) northeasterly across Lake Duchamp (elevation: 415 metres (1,362 ft)) on its full length, to its mouth;
- 1.1 kilometres (0.68 mi) easterly forming a southwesterly curve to the south shore of Buies Lake;
- 6.7 kilometres (4.2 mi) to the North, first crossing the Buies Lake (length: 5.2 kilometres (3.2 mi); altitude: 412 metres (1,352 ft)), up to at the southern limit of the canton of Provancher;
- 3.3 kilometres (2.1 mi) north-east in Provancher and Achintre township across Lake Jaux (length: 3.8 kilometres (2.4 mi); altitude: 410 metres (1,350 ft)), to its mouth;
- 5.0 kilometres (3.1 mi) southerly across Faucher Lake (length: 5.6 kilometres (3.5 mi); altitude: 410 metres (1,350 ft)), to its mouth. Note: Lake Faucher straddles the townships of Achintre and Faucher;
- 1.4 kilometres (0.87 mi) East to Faucher Township to the mouth of the river.

The mouth of the Faucher River is located at:

- 4.7 kilometres (2.9 mi) south of the Canadian National Railway) which passes on the south shore of Tessier Lake (Gouin Reservoir);
- 12.7 kilometres (7.9 mi) south of the mouth of Tessier Lake (Gouin Reservoir);
- 21.5 kilometres (13.4 mi) south-east of the mouth of the Tessier Lake (Gouin Reservoir);
- 59.9 kilometres (37.2 mi) south of the village center of Obedjiwan, Quebec which is located on a peninsula on the north shore of Gouin Reservoir;
- 89 kilometres (55 mi) south-west of Gouin Dam;
- 114 kilometres (71 mi) west of the village center of Wemotaci, Quebec (north shore of the Saint-Maurice River);
- 202.6 kilometres (125.9 mi) north-west of downtown La Tuque.

The mouth of the Faucher River merges with the west shore of the southern part of Lake Tessier. From there, the current flows over 170.9 kilometres (106.2 mi) until Gouin dam, according to the following segments:

- 18.3 kilometres (11.4 mi) to the North crossing the Tessier Lake (Gouin Reservoir);
- 17.7 kilometres (11.0 mi) to the North via the discharge of Tessier Lake (Gouin Reservoir);
- 53.0 kilometres (32.9 mi) northeasterly, crossing Mattawa Bay and the western portion of Gouin Reservoir to the height of Obedjiwan, Quebec Village;
- 81.9 kilometres (50.9 mi) to the East, crossing the Marmette Lake, then to the South-East crossing in particular the Brochu Lake then to the East crossing the Kikendatch Bay until Gouin Dam.
From this dam, the current flows along the Saint-Maurice River to Trois-Rivières.

== Toponymy ==
The term "Faucher" refers to a family name of French origin. In this sector, the term "Faucher" is associated with the township, the lake and the river.

The toponym "Faucher River" was formalized on December 5, 1968 at the Commission de toponymie du Québec, when it was created.

== See also ==
- Saint-Maurice River
- Gouin Reservoir, a body of water
- Kikendatch Bay, a body of water
- Brochu Lake, a body of water
- Nevers Lake, a body of water
- McSweeney Lake, a body of water
- Marmette Lake, a body of water
- Du Mâle Lake, a body of water
- Saraana Bay, a body of water
- La Tuque, a city
- Clova, Quebec, a village
- List of rivers of Quebec
