= Lake Tourouvre =

- Location within Quebec
- Location: Mauricie, Quebec
- Coordinates: 47.764°N 72.900°W
- Type: Artificial lake
- Primary inflows: Saint-Maurice River, River Trenche
- Primary outflows: Saint-Maurice River
- Basin countries: Canada
- Max. length: 8.4 km (5.2 mi)
- Max. width: 4 km (2.5 mi)
- Surface area: 14.48 km^{2} (5.59 sq mi)
- Max. depth: 53 m (174 ft)

Lake Tourouvre has been artificially formed in 1950 by damming the Saint-Maurice River with the La Trenche Generating Station built at southeast of the lake, north of La Tuque, in the administrative region of Mauricie, in Quebec, in Canada. Located entirely in forest and mountainous areas, this water body of 1,448 ha is ideal for tourist activities including boating, fishing, hunting, and other similar lakeside pastimes.

== Geography ==
Lake Tourouvre receives the waters of the River Trenche through a long strait of 4 km (2.5 mi) by 0.7 km (0.43 mi) maximum width in northeast. Lake Tourouvre is 4 km (2.5 mi) wide by 8.4 km (5.2 mi) (including the Strait at the mouth of the River Trenche). The Saint-Maurice River flows into the lake Tourouvre by the west side.

The dam of the "La Trenche Generating Station" is located 11.2 km (7.0 mi) (calculated by the water) upstream of the mouth of Vermillon River (La Tuque), 22.8 km (14.2 mi) from the dam Beaumont generating station, and 35.2 km (21.9 mi) from the dam of the La Tuque Generating Station. This concrete dam-gravity type has a height of 53 m (174 ft) and a length of 442 m (1,450 ft). Its retained capacity is 6×10^{6} m^{3} (2.1×10^{8} cu ft) of water measured at the outlet of Lake Tourouvre.

From the boulevard Ducharme in La Tuque, Lake Tourouvre can by reached by 48.7 km (30.3 mi) of road from "Rivière Croche" (Crooked River), the West rank and a forest road. The latter road crosses the Saint-Maurice River to the barrage of La Trenche Generating Station.

The hamlet "Trenche" is located near the dam Trenche on the west bank of the Saint-Maurice River. A forest road serves the hamlet.

== Toponymy ==
The old names of this lake were "Beaver Lake" and "Lake Trenche".

This French toponym is derived from the town of Tourouvre, located in the Perche in France. This town was in the seventeenth century an important centers of French emigration into Canada. French geographer Reclus (1830-1905) wrote that this town is "the place in Europe that contributed to the most part, the settlement of the New World". The House of French Emigration to Canada, open to the public on October 1, 2006, was established symbolically Tourouvre, France.

The name "Lake Tourouvre" was officially registered on December 5, 1968, at the Bank of place names in Commission de toponymie du Québec (Geographical Names Board of Québec).

== See also ==
- River Trenche
- Saint-Maurice River
- La Tuque
- Mauricie
