= Lake Trenche =

- Location within Quebec
- Location: Saguenay–Lac-Saint-Jean region, Quebec
- Coordinates: 48°39′55″N 73°24′03″W
- Type: Natural
- Primary outflows: River Trenche (La Tuque)
- Basin countries: Canada
- Max. length: 4.4 km (2.7 mi)
- Max. width: 1.8 km (1.1 mi)

The Lake Trenche is located in the unorganized territory of Lac-Ashuapmushuan, in Haute-Mauricie, in Le Domaine-du-Roy Regional County Municipality, in the administrative region of Saguenay-Lac-Saint-Jean, in Quebec, in Canada. This lake is located entirely in forest land.

== Geography ==
This lake is a natural extension of the river Trenche which flows from north to south, and empties into the Lake Tourouvre formed by the Dam Trenche the Saint-Maurice River. Located entirely in forest areas, the surface of "Trenche Lake" is frozen from November until early April.

Trenche the lake is very deformed, consisting of islands, peninsulas, natural piers jutting out into the lake and numerous bays. Its shape resembles a "Y" formed by a series of smaller lakes, as if they had been created by the fall of meteorites. The Trenche lake fed by the north into two parts: the branch of the northwest and the northeast branch (the most important). The latter is an extension of the River Trenche (La Tuque), flowing from north to south.

Visitors can access to the "lake Trenche" by forest paths of Consolidated Bathurst, which roughly follow the path of the River Trenche, one of the five largest tributaries of the Saint-Maurice River.

== Toponymy ==
In Canada, the term "Trenche" is integrated with a series of toponyms:

- Northern of La Tuque: Lake Trenche, Trenche (hamlet), dam Trenche, La Trenche Generating Station, bridge of Trenche River, station Trenche (processing station), River Trenche and Trenche South River;
- Region Saguenay-Lac-Saint-Jean in the unorganized territory of Lac-Ashuapmushuan, MRC Le Domaine-du-Roy Regional County Municipality: Trenche lake, Trenche East River, a small river Trenche West, Dam of Trenche River, small lake Trenche, Trenche Lake dam and dam of the little River Trenche West.

The name "Lake Trenche" was formalized on December 5, 1968, at the Bank of place names in Commission de toponymie du Québec (Geographical Names Board of Québec)
