= Oskélanéo (disambiguation) =

Oskélanéo a community in northern Quebec, Canada, within the boundaries of the City of La Tuque.

Oskélanéo may also refer to:

- Oskélanéo Lake, in the southwestern part of Gouin Reservoir in Quebec, Canada
- Oskélanéo River, a tributary of the South Bay of Bureau Lake in Quebec, Canada
