= Trenche =

Trenche may refer to:

== Canada ==
- Lac de la Trenche, in La Tuque (urban agglomeration), Mauricie, Québec
- River Trenche, a tributary of the Saint-Maurice River, Québec
- Central Trenche, an hydroelectric dam located on the Saint-Maurice River in La Tuque, in Upper-Mauricie, Québec
- Lac de la Trenche, in La Tuque, Mauricie, Québec
- Lake Trenche (Lac-Ashuapmushuan), Lac-Ashuapmushuan, Le Domaine-du-Roy Regional County Municipality, Québec

== France ==
- La Tranche-sur-Mer, a seaside resort in southern Vendée, near La Rochelle region of Pays de la Loire

== See also ==
- Tranche
