= Tessier Lake =

Lake in Quebec, Canada

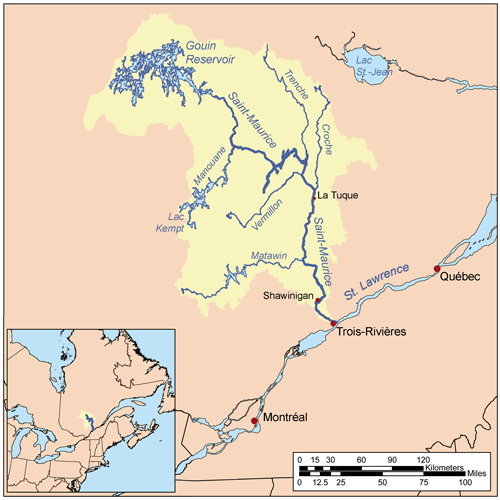
- Watershed of Saint-Maurice River

- Location within Quebec
- Location: La Tuque
- Coordinates: 48°12′27″N 75°14′30″W
- Type: Baie of dam
- Primary inflows: (clockwise); Outlet of a set of lakes such « Des Neiges Lake » and « Du Brouillard Lake »; Faucher River; outlet of lake Clairville; outlet of a set of unidentified lakes; outlet of an unidentified lake.
- Primary outflows: Outlet of Tessier Lake
- Basin countries: Canada
- Max. length: 18.4 kilometres (11.4 mi)
- Max. width: 3.2 kilometres (2.0 mi)
- Surface elevation: 407 metres (1,335 ft)

The Tessier Lake is a freshwater body located on the south side of the southwestern part of the Gouin Reservoir, in the territory of the town of La Tuque, in the region of Mauricie, in the province of Quebec, in Canada.

This lake straddles the townships of Faucher (southern part) and Achintre (northern part).

Recreotourism activities are the main economic activity of the sector. Forestry comes second.

The Forest Road R1009 passes on the west side of Mattawa Bay serving the lower Flapjack River, passing in the northern part of Tessier Lake and the southern part of Bureau Lake (Gouin Reservoir). This R1009 road joins the Southeast route 404 which serves the northern part of the Canadian National Railway.

The surface of Tessier Lake is usually frozen from mid-November to the end of April, however safe ice circulation is generally from early December to the end of March.

== Geography ==
The main hydrographic slopes near Lake Tessier are:
- north side: Gouin Reservoir, Saraana Bay, Mattawa Bay, Du Mâle Lake, Hanotaux Bay, Flapjack River, Bureau Lake (Gouin Reservoir);
- east side: Bureau Lake (Gouin Reservoir) (South Bay), Oskélanéo River, Sulte Lake, Oskélanéo Lake;
- south side: Tourigny Lake, Du Brouillard Lake, Douville River, Gosselin River;
- west side: Buies Lake, Faucher River, Flapjack River, Bignell Creek, Mégiscane River.

With a length of 18.4 kilometres (11.4 mi), Lake Tessier is made along the length (North-South direction). Its southwestern part is connected to Tourigny Lake thanks to a short strait formed by the narrowing of the banks. Lake Tessier is mainly fed by the Faucher River which empties on its west shore (southern part of Lake Tessier) in a bay which has a length in the North-South direction of 2.9 kilometres (1.8 mi); this bay is bordered on the west by a peninsula stretching to the south.

The mouth of Tessier Lake is located northeast to:

- 9.4 kilometres (5.8 mi) south-east of the mouth of the Tessier Lake outlet;
- 21.9 kilometres (13.6 mi) south of the mouth of the Saraana Bay;
- 48.1 kilometres (29.9 mi) South of the village center of Obedjiwan, Quebec which is located on a peninsula on the north bank of the Gouin Reservoir;
- 86 kilometres (53 mi) south-west of Gouin Dam;
- 118 kilometres (73 mi) west of the village center of Wemotaci, Quebec (north shore of the Saint-Maurice River);
- 206 kilometres (128 mi) west of downtown La Tuque;
- 297 kilometres (185 mi) northwest of the mouth of the Saint-Maurice River (confluence with the St. Lawrence River at Trois-Rivières).

From the mouth of Lake Tessier, the current flows over 147.8 kilometres (91.8 mi) to Gouin Dam, according to the following segments:

- 9.8 kilometres (6.1 mi) northward in Achintre township by taking the Lake Tessier outlet, including crossing Arcand Lake (length: 5.3 kilometres (3.3 mi); altitude: 403 metres (1,322 ft)) on its full length, to the southern limit of the canton of Evanturel;
- 7.7 kilometres (4.8 mi) northwesterly in the canton of Evanturel, still following the Tessier Lake outlet, forming a northward curve at the beginning of the segment and then crossing the northern part of Kaotoskonakamak Lake (length: 1.4 kilometres (0.87 mi); altitude: 402 metres (1,319 ft)) over 0.8 kilometres (0.50 mi), to a bay on the south shore of the Saraana Bay;
- 14.3 kilometres (8.9 mi) to the North crossing the Saraana Bay;
- 34.1 kilometres (21.2 mi) to the northeast, crossing the Du Mâle Lake and the western part of Gouin Reservoir to the middle of Toussaint Lake located at South of village Obedjiwan, Quebec;
- 81.9 kilometres (50.9 mi) to the East, crossing the Marmette Lake, then to the South-East crossing in particular the Brochu Lake then to the East crossing the Kikendatch Bay until Gouin Dam.
From this dam, the current flows along the Saint-Maurice River to Trois-Rivières.

== Toponymy ==
The term "Tessier" is a family name of French origin.

The toponym "Lac Tessier" was formalized on December 5, 1968, by the Commission de toponymie du Québec, when it was created.

== See also ==
- Saint-Maurice River, a watercourse
- Gouin Reservoir, a body of water
- Kikendatch Bay, a body of water
- Brochu Lake, a body of water
- McSeeney Lake, a body of water
- Marmette Lake, a body of water
- Du Mâle Lake, a body of water
- Saraana Bay, a body of water
- Faucher River, a watercourse
- La Tuque, a city
- List of lakes in Canada
