= Gabelle (disambiguation) =

Gabelle of salt was a historic salt tax in France.

Gabelle may also refer to:

- Pierre Gabelle (1908-1982), a French political figure
- La Gabelle Generating Station, a hydroelectric plant in Quebec, Canada
- Théophile Gabelle, a fictional character in Dickens' A Tale of two Cities
