= Oskélanéo River =

Oskélanéo
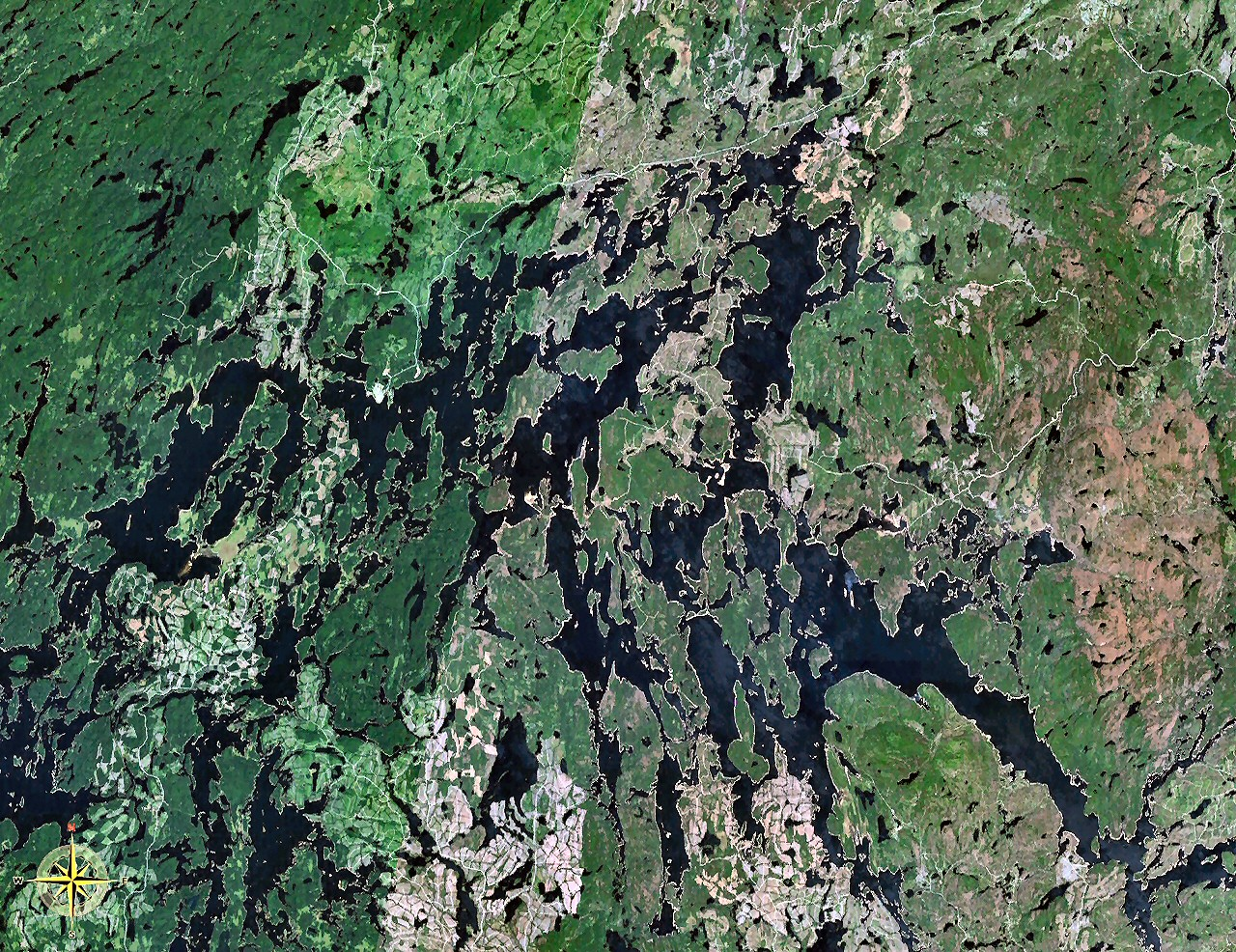
- Map of Saint-Maurice River watershed

Location
- Country: Canada
- Province: Quebec
- Region: Mauricie

Physical characteristics
- Source: Oskélanéo Lake
  - location: La Tuque (Faucher Township), Mauricie, Quebec
  - coordinates: 48°10′36″N 74°08′51″W
  - elevation: 404 m (1,325 ft)
- Mouth: Bureau Lake (South Bay)
  - location: La Tuque (Achintre Township), Mauricie, Quebec
  - coordinates: 48°15′20″N 75°08′12″W
  - elevation: 402 m (1,319 ft)
- Length: 12.6 km (7.8 mi)

Basin features
- Tributaries
  - left: (upstream); Outlet of lake Achintre; Outlet lake Courtis.
  - right: Mistatikamekw River

The Oskélanéo River is a tributary of the South Bay of Bureau Lake (Gouin Reservoir), flowing into the town of La Tuque, in the administrative region of Mauricie, in Quebec, in Canada.

The Oskélanéo River runs successively in the cantons of Faucher and Achintre. Forestry is the main economic activity of this valley; recreational tourism activities, second.

The route 404, connecting the village of Clova, Quebec to the South Bay of Bureau Lake (Gouin Reservoir) serves the lower part of the Oskélanéo River; this road connects to the south-east the route 400 which goes to Gouin Dam. Some secondary forest roads are in use nearby for forestry and recreational tourism activities.

The surface of the Oskélanéo River is usually frozen from mid-November to the end of April, however, safe ice circulation is generally from early December to the end of March.

== History ==
Thanks to the arrival of the Transcontinental Railway around 1910, Oskelaneo River Station contributed to the development of the village of Oskélanéo. The main economic activity was forestry. Nevertheless, recreational tourism activities developed rapidly, notably with the first raising of the Gouin Reservoir level in 1918, then the second raising in 1948. Given the current level of water in the lake, the village of Oskélanéo offers access to boating a direct access road to Gouin Reservoir down the Oskélanéo River. In the past, prior to the development of motorized forest roads, travelers were getting off the train at the Oskelaneo River station and using the services of outfitters for hunting and fishing trips.

== Geography ==
The surrounding hydrographic slopes of the Oskélanéo River are:
- north side: Bureau Lake (Gouin Reservoir), Nemio River, Du Mâle Lake, Toussaint Lake, Marmette Lake, McSeeney Lake;
- east side: Benjamin Lake, Sulte Lake, Francoeur Lake, Parker Creek, De La Galette River (Gouin Reservoir);
- south side: Sulte Lake, Bazin River, Douville River, Gosselin River;
- west side: Tessier Lake (Gouin Reservoir), Saraana Bay, Flapjack River, Bignell Creek.

The Oskélanéo River originates at the mouth of Oskélanéo Lake (length: 15.8 kilometres (9.8 mi), altitude: 404 metres (1,325 ft)). The village of Oskélanéo is located on the West shore of this lake. The mouth of this head lake is located at:

- 8.1 kilometres (5.0 mi) north of the village of Oskélanéo which is located along the Canadian National Railway, on the west shore of Oskélanéo Lake;
- 9.6 kilometres (6.0 mi) South of the mouth of the Oskélanéo River (confluence with Bureau Lake (Gouin Reservoir));
- 55.3 kilometres (34.4 mi) South of the village center of Obedjiwan, Quebec (located on a peninsula on the north shore of Gouin Reservoir);
- 47.9 kilometres (29.8 mi) north-east of the village center of Parent, Quebec;
- 80.4 kilometres (50.0 mi) southwest of Gouin Dam erected at the mouth of the Gouin Reservoir (confluence with the Saint-Maurice River);
- 106.2 kilometres (66.0 mi) west of the village center of Wemotaci, Quebec which is located along the Saint-Maurice River;
- 194 kilometres (121 mi) north-west of downtown La Tuque.

From the mouth of the head lake, the course of the Oskélanéo River flows over 12.6 kilometres (7.8 mi) according to the following segments:

- 3.7 kilometres (2.3 mi) northeasterly entering the Achintre Township, in a marsh zone, to the confluence of the Mistatikamekw River (coming from the Southeast);
- 5.4 kilometres (3.4 mi) northwesterly in the marsh zone to the outlet (from the southwest) of Lake Achintre;
- 3.5 kilometres (2.2 mi) northeasterly in a marsh zone to the mouth of the river.

The mouth of the Oskélanéo River is located at:

- 17.6 kilometres (10.9 mi) north of the village of Oskélanéo, Quebec which is located along the Canadian National Railway, on the west shore of Oskélanéo Lake;
- 34.8 kilometres (21.6 mi) South of the mouth of the Bureau Lake (Gouin Reservoir);
- 45.8 kilometres (28.5 mi) south of the village center of Obedjiwan, Quebec which is located on a peninsula on the north shore of Gouin Reservoir;
- 107.5 kilometres (66.8 mi) west of the village center of Wemotaci, Quebec (north shore of the Saint-Maurice River);
- 197 kilometres (122 mi) north-west of downtown La Tuque;
- 289 kilometres (180 mi) northwest of the mouth of the Saint-Maurice River (confluence with the St. Lawrence River at Trois-Rivières).

== Toponymy ==
Until 1918, when the erection of the La Loutre Central, which will create the first level designated then Gouin Reservoir, the Oskélanéo River was considered to be one of the tributaries of the Saint-Maurice River), feeding the Bureau Lake (Gouin Reservoir).

This hydronym appears in cartographic documents at least since the first half of the 19th century, i.e. on the map of Charles Magnus (1857), in the form of Oskelanaio, then that of Eugène Taché in 1870. In 1914, this river was designated Escalana by Eugène Rouillard and on maps in particular in 1935. The designation "Escalona" is also indicated on maps of 1924 and 1926. Escalana (or Escalona) derives from oskélanéo which is an Algonquin word meaning "bones".

Nevertheless, some sources consider that oskélanéo results from the deformation and fusion of the words tchiask, meaning "gull", and sakegane, meaning "lake"; consequently, this hydronym would be translated as "gull lake" or "gull flight". In Atikamekw, the Oskélanéo River becomes "Kiackoranan Sipi", meaning "river of the gull caught in the net". One [Canadian National] railway station has been designated "Oskelaneo River". The term "Oskelaneo", alone, was the name of a post office (1921-1973) serving what is now a hamlet.

The toponym "Oskélanéo River" was formalized on December 5, 1968 at the Commission de toponymie du Québec, when it was created.

== See also ==
- Saint-Maurice River
- Gouin Reservoir, a body of water
- Kikendatch Bay, a body of water
- Brochu Lake, a body of water
- Nevers Lake, a body of water
- McSweeney Lake, a body of water
- Marmette Lake, a body of water
- Bureau Lake, a body of water
- Oskélanéo Lake, a body of water
- Mistatikamekw River, a watercourse
- La Tuque, a city
- List of rivers of Quebec
