= Île Saint-Christophe (Canada) =

Coordinates: 46.361°N 72.536°W

Île Saint-Christophe is a small island adjacent to Saint-Quentin Island in the Saint-Maurice River at its confluence with the Saint Lawrence River in the city of Trois-Rivières, Quebec, Canada.

The island is home to HMCS Radisson, a Canadian Forces Naval Reserve Division.
