= Death of Alexandra Martine Diengo Lumbayi =

2024 disappearance of woman in Canada

Alexandra Diengo Lumbayi
- Born: 9 May 2003; Kinshasa, Democratic Republic of the Congo
- Disappeared: 2 October 2024 (age 21); Saint-Quentin Island
- Body discovered: Saint-Quentin Island in Trois-Rivières
- Other names: Alex
- Education: Université du Québec à Trois-Rivières
- Occupation: Student
- Parents: Georges Lumbayi (father); Rosemine Ndjondo (mother)

On 2 October 2024, Alexandra Martine Diengo Lumbayi, a 21-year-old Congolese international student at the University of Quebec in Trois-Rivières (UQTR), was reported missing in the afternoon around Saint-Quentin Island in Trois-Rivières. Search efforts were organized promptly on 4–5 October to track her down. On Sunday, 6 October, divers from the Sûreté du Québec (SQ) collaborated with investigators from the Trois-Rivières Police Department (Direction de la police de Trois-Rivières) to draft a strategic approach for underwater search missions. An SQ helicopter carried out reconnaissance flights over Saint-Quentin Island. On the same day, Diengo's mother, Rosemine Ndjondo, posted a TikTok video raising awareness about her daughter's disappearance. The video went viral, receiving over 5 million views and evoking a massive show of support on social media in Canada and the Democratic Republic of the Congo.

On 7 October, investigators retrieved a slipper and bracelet presumed to be hers, which were sent for DNA testing. Her body was discovered on 8 October floating in marina on Saint-Quentin Island and Kruger Wayagamack Inc. property. The coroner noted that DNA testing was required because of the body's condition, and an inquiry is underway to determine the exact events and circumstances that led to Diengo's death.

== Background ==
Alexandra Martine Diengo Lumbayi was born on 9 May 2003, in Kinshasa, Democratic Republic of Congo. She is the sole offspring of her parents, Rosemine Ndjondo and Georges Lumbayi. Ndjondo conceived Diengo at the age of 17, with Georges Lumbayi repudiating the pregnancy, causing her to endure the challenges of motherhood alone. Ndjondo described her daughter as a considerate young woman who was hardworking and dedicated to her academic pursuits. In due course, she enrolled Diengo at top schools in Cameroon and South Africa. In 2023, Diengo began her studies in business administration at the University of Quebec in Trois-Rivières (UQTR).

== Disappearance ==
Diengo was last seen on Wednesday, 2 October, around 3:40 p.m., near Saint-Quentin Island. She is described as having black hair, brown eyes, a height of 1.73 meters (5 feet, 6 inches), and weighing about 45 kilograms (99 pounds). At the time she went missing, she was wearing dark-colored clothing and carrying a large white handbag. Diengo's mother, Rosemine Ndjondo, reported her missing after several days without contact. Surveillance footage released from Saint-Quentin Island on Wednesday, 2 October, at around 4:10 p.m., shows Diengo alone in at least four instances. Her last recorded movements were towards a wooded area of the island, dropped off by her roommate, who was the final person to see her, at the entrance to Chemin de l'Île Saint-Christophe. "The roommate was the one to file the initial report and has been interviewed by investigators". Coordinated search operations were initiated promptly on 4–5 October in an effort to locate her whereabouts.

On 6 October, Sunday morning, divers from the Sûreté du Québec (SQ) collaborated with Trois-Rivières Police Department (Direction de la police de Trois-Rivières) investigators to devise a tactical plan for aquatic search efforts. An SQ helicopter conducted aerial reconnaissance over Saint-Quentin Island. That same day, Ndjondo released an impassioned TikTok video to raise awareness of her daughter's disappearance. In the video, she shared her anguish, stating, "I haven't been drinking, I'm not eating, I'm not sleeping. I don't even know how to close my eyes anymore or how to live". She further disclosed that law enforcement indicated Diengo's cellphone had ceased transmitting messages since 2 October. The video went viral, accumulating more than 5 million views, and triggering an outpouring of support on social media, both in Canada and the DRC. Contacted by Radio-Canada later that day, Ndjondo affirmed her intention to travel imminently to Trois-Rivières to contribute personally to the search efforts. The Trois-Rivières Police Department appealed to the public for assistance to locate Diengo. The General Association of Students of the University of Quebec at Trois-Rivières (Association générale étudiante de l'Université du Québec à Trois-Rivières; AGE UQTR) and members of Congolese, Cameroonian, and Senegalese communities joined the search, with some actively assisting on the island. Volunteers disseminated posters extensively across Saint-Quentin Island, seeking information from people who might possess critical knowledge. Josée-Anne Labrousse, the park's general manager, stated that the staff empathizes deeply with Diengo's loved ones and pledged the park's cooperation to assist in the investigation.

On 7 October, searches of Saint-Quentin Island yielded no breakthroughs, and on-ground operations were suspended due to "lack of evidence". However, later that afternoon, a slipper and a bracelet suspected to belong to her were discovered and handed to forensic experts for DNA testing. On Tuesday morning, 8 October, a kayaker found her body in the St. Maurice River near the marina on Saint-Quentin Island and Kruger Wayagamack Inc. property at 10:20 a.m. Police, emergency medical responders, and fire personnel were dispatched to the marina. An assembly of approximately 80 students and members of the Congolese diaspora traveled to Saint-Quentin Island. Many of them came from Montreal to offer their help in the search for pertinent evidence that might facilitate the resumption of official investigatory procedures. The coroner, after conducting an assessment, identified the remains as 21-year-old Alexandra Martine Diengo Lumbayi later that afternoon. The results of the DNA test on the shoe retrieved from the island were still unknown. According to Radio-Canada, the coroner indicated that the test was requisite due to the degree of decomposition of the body, and an inquiry is presently underway to ascertain the precise causes and circumstances surrounding Diengo's death.

A memorial mass, attended by the deceased's relatives, was held on the evening of 9 October at the Cathédrale de l'Assomption de Trois-Rivières. In the wake of the tragedy, Ndjondo went to the Canadian embassy in Kinshasa to expedite her trip to Canada. Magloire Bigindi, the President of the Congolese Students Association at UQTR, expressed a desire to meet with her to honor the memory of her daughter. François-Philippe Champagne, the Member of Parliament for Saint-Maurice—Champlain and Minister confirmed that the Canadian government took swift action to facilitate the necessary visa process, ensuring the prompt arrival of Diengo's family in Trois-Rivières. "Visas are being issued, we are following this hour by hour! Because we had to work with the Congolese embassy in Ottawa, identify the families with the UQTR and have all the necessary information".

On 10 October, in Kinshasa, President Félix Tshisekedi, accompanied by First Lady Denise Nyakéru Tshisekedi, received Diengo's parents at the Cité de l'Union Africaine. Yelu Mulop, coordinator of the Presidency's specialized service on youth and violence prevention, remarked that the President has committed to supporting the family while investigations continue. On 14 October, two visas had been issued to permit the family's entry, though their intended travel as a delegation introduced additional complexities to the process. On 24 October, the family arrived in Trois-Rivières, where they met with Minister François-Philippe Champagne and Mayor Jean Lamarche, who extended condolences and offered the community's solidarity as outlined in an official statement. Also present at the meeting were Joska Kabongo Ngoy, the Democratic Republic of the Congo's ambassador-designate, and Caroline D'Astous, UQTR's director of government relations. After visiting the site of Diengo's disappearance and reflecting on her final moments in the room she rented, the family expressed a singular priority, as stated by Georges Lumbayi: "elucidating the circumstances in which our child met her death". Ndjondo later posted a TikTok video thanking those who helped in the search.

== Public reactions ==
=== Memorials and tributes ===
In the days following the discovery of Diengo's body, friends, relatives, and members of the Congolese community gathered near the marina where she was found, where they adorned the site with flowers and stuffed animals. The Congolese Students Association of the UQTR (Association des Étudiants Congolais de l'UQTR; AEC UQTR) organized a candlelit vigil in front of the university's Ringuet Pavilion, drawing approximately 400 attendees. The gathering featured speeches from friends and colleagues who shared memories of Diengo and honored her life. A memorial mass was also held on 9 October at the Cathédrale de l'Assomption de Trois-Rivières, attended by Diengo's relatives and supporters.

Magloire Bigindi, president of the AEC UQTR, reflected on the shock felt by the community, stating, "It's extremely rare for this kind of thing to happen here in Trois-Rivières. We were hoping to find our sister Alexandra, but the reality was different". Similarly, Jean-François Hinse, interim director of communications and alumni relations at UQTR, acknowledged the impact of Diengo's death, noting that it deeply affected both Congolese international students and the broader Québécois community.

On 5 November, Ndjondo and Lumbayi attended the funeral at Mary, Queen of the World Cathedral in Montreal, where nearly 200 friends, relatives, and members of the Congolese community gathered to pay their final respects to Diengo.

=== Repercussions, calls for support, and demonstrations ===
The tragedy prompted some students to seek psychosocial assistance from UQTR's services, with psychologist Simon Turcotte emphasizing that reactions to such events vary widely, ranging from distress to anger to emotional numbness.

Joska Kabongo Ngoy, the Democratic Republic of the Congo's ambassador-designate to Canada, visited Saint-Quentin Island and later met with UQTR's rector. However, his involvement sparked controversy among Congolese community members, with some criticizing the perceived delay in his response. A meeting with students became contentious, requiring his departure under the escort of security personnel. On 10 October, President Félix Tshisekedi and First Lady Denise Nyakéru Tshisekedi received Diengo's parents at the Cité de l'Union Africaine, pledging continued support during the ongoing investigation.

Women from the NGO Génération Femme and Radio de la Femme took to the streets of Kinshasa on Friday, 11 October, at the behest of Elfie Esther Nkishi Ilunga. The peaceful demonstration commenced in the Batetela neighborhood in the Gombe commune and concluded at the Canadian embassy in Kinshasa, where a memorandum was presented and read by Elfie Esther Nkishi, the founder of Génération Femme and the General Director of Radio de la Femme.

=== Collective grief and advocacy ===
On 14 October, Karol Ntemo, secretary general of the Congolese community at UQTR, spoke on Radio-Canada's Toujours le matin, voicing a prevailing impatience and frustration within the community. "There is a strong desire for clarity regarding whether a funeral will take place and if a gathering can be arranged. While we are indeed in a state of confusion, our primary focus remains on honoring our sister with a proper burial. This is our foremost objective".

On 18 October, approximately 50 people gathered at the Ormeaux Community Centre in Trois-Rivières. The event was organized by UQTR professor Yvon Nawej to express their emotions and seek comfort in solidarity.

=== Family and personal reflections ===
Diengo's father, Lumbayi, rejected any notion of suicide, emphasizing her optimism and ambition. In an interview with Radio-Canada on 24 October, he recounted her enthusiasm for her new telecommunications job and her declaration, "I will take over from you, Dad".

Congolese actress Bellevue Kandy conveyed her sympathies, stating, "The most profound tears are not those that fall from our eyes, but rather those that remain unspoken within our hearts, where they linger and cause us pain. Your passing has profoundly impacted us all. I extend my deepest condolences to the family of the departed".
