= Beaumont Generating Station =

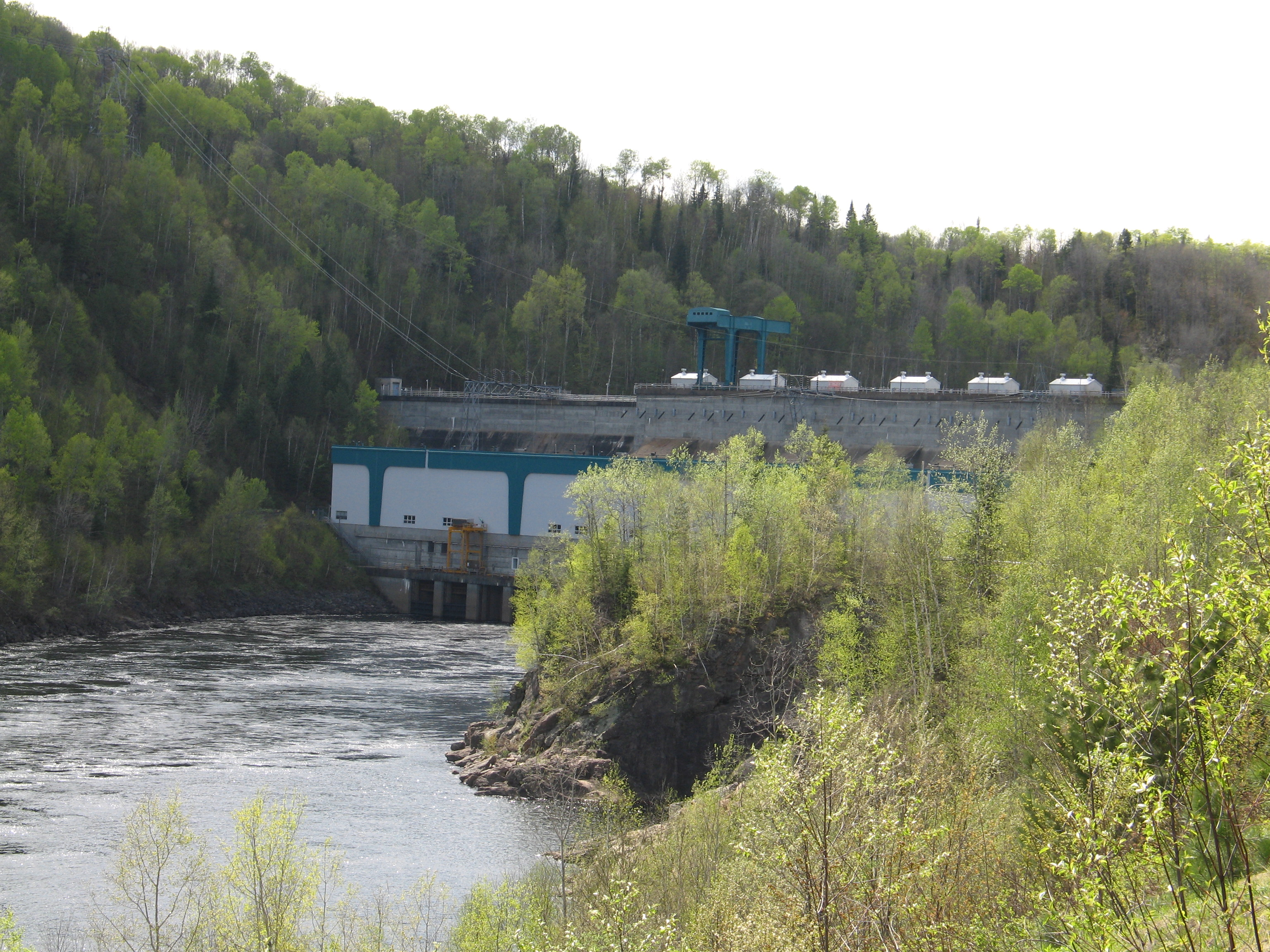
- View of the Central Beaumont
- Interactive map of Beaumont Generating Station
- Country: Canada
- Location: La Tuque, Mauricie, Québec
- Coordinates: 47°33′20″N 72°50′12″W
- Status: Operational
- Construction began: 1958
- Opening date: 1958-1959
- Owner: Hydro-Québec

Dam and spillways
- Type of dam: Gravity dam
- Impounds: Saint-Maurice River
- Height: 37.8 m (124 ft)
- Height (foundation): 52
- Length: 489 m (1,604 ft)

Reservoir
- Total capacity: 2
- Catchment area: 28526
- Surface area: 500 ha (1,200 acres)
- Normal elevation: 193

Power Station
- Operator: Hydro-Québec
- Type: Francis
- Turbines: 6
- Installed capacity: 270 MW

Beaumont Generating Station is a hydroelectric dam built on the Saint-Maurice River, in Zec de La Croche, in upper Mauricie, Quebec, Canada. This hydroelectric dam is located between La Trenche generating station and La Tuque generating station. It is the fifth dam from the head of the river, among 11. Unlike the other hydroelectric plants on the river, which took the name from the rapids or falls they drowned, the Central Beaumont was named for Robert J. Beaumont, the former president of the Shawinigan Water & Power Company.

== Images ==
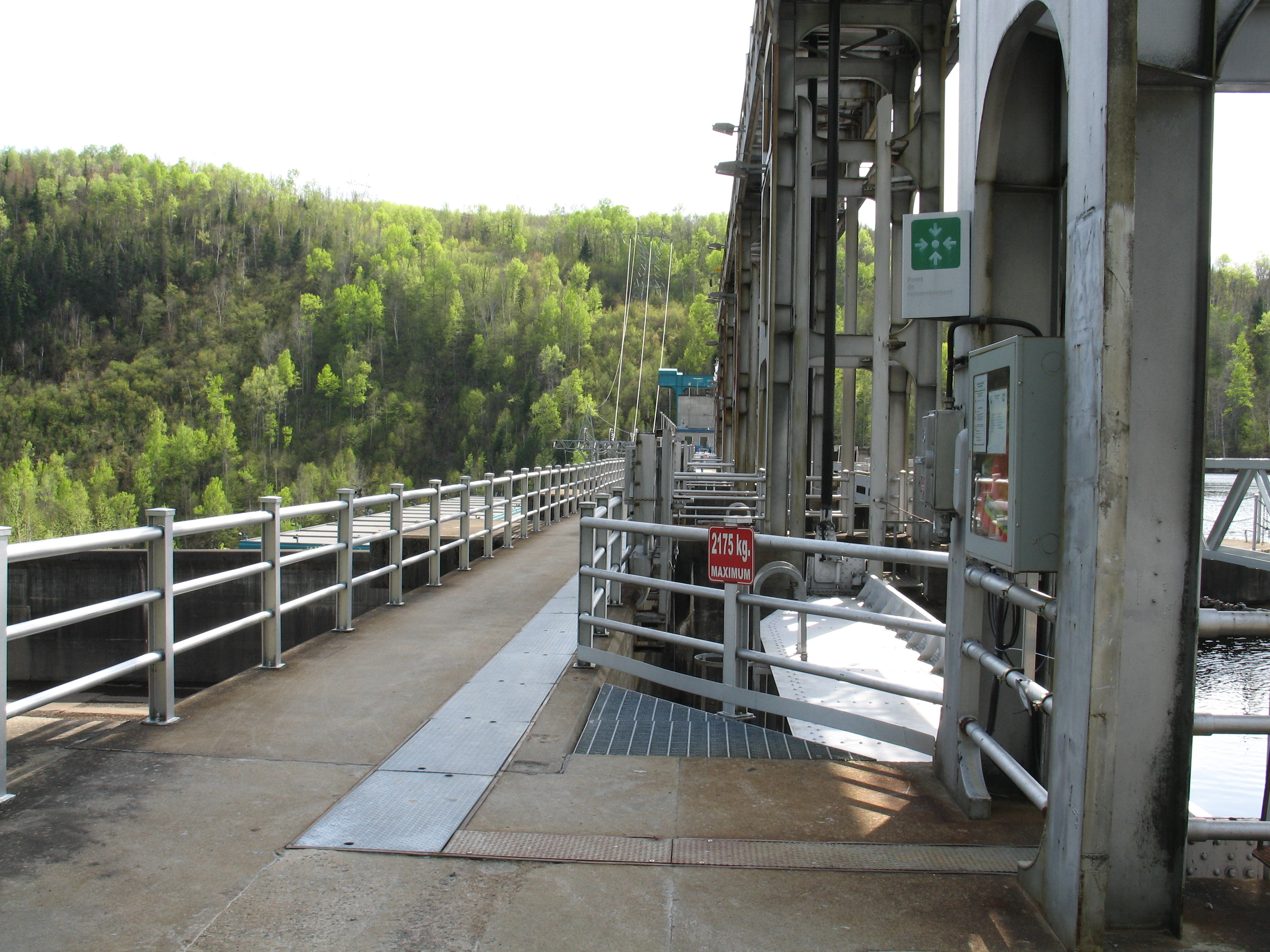
Beaumont Central of Hydro-Québec in La Tuque

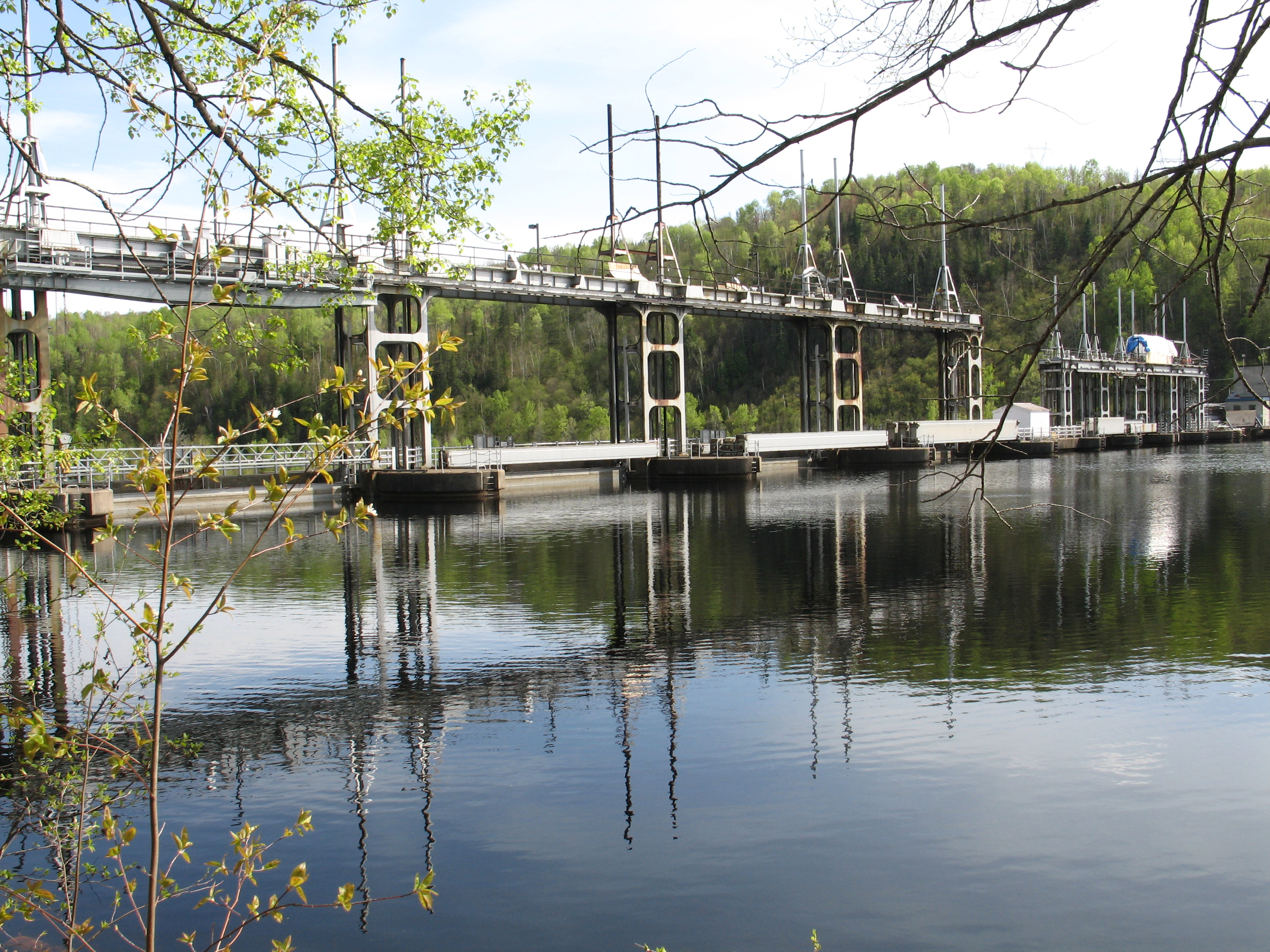
Beaumont dam, water retention on Saint-Maurice River

== See also ==
- Hydro-Québec
- Saint-Maurice River
- La Tuque
- Mauricie
- Zec de La Croche
