= Oskélanéo Lake =

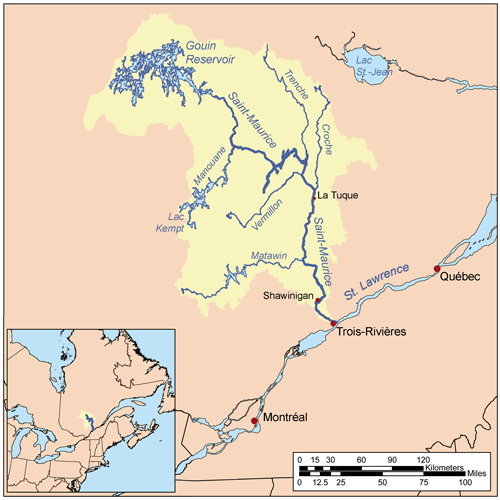
- Watershed of Saint-Maurice River

- Location within Quebec
- Location: La Tuque
- Coordinates: 48°07′49″N 75°10′53″W
- Type: Lake of dam
- Primary inflows: (clockwise); Parker Creek; Froissart Creek; outlet of lakes Alex, Marcotte and Gisborne; outlet of lakes Bob and Serge; outlet of lakes Cain, Labbé and Marchand; outlet of lake Ted; outlet of lake Hill (via Haylow Bay).
- Primary outflows: Oskélanéo River (tributary of Bureau Lake (Gouin Reservoir)
- Basin countries: Canada
- Max. length: 15.8 kilometres (9.8 mi)
- Max. width: 2.9 kilometres (1.8 mi)
- Surface elevation: 404 metres (1,325 ft)

Oskélanéo Lake is a freshwater body linked to the southwestern part of the Gouin Reservoir (via Bureau Lake (Gouin Reservoir), in the territory of the town of La Tuque, in the administrative region of Mauricie, in the province of Quebec, Canada.

All of the lake is in the canton of Faucher. Since the completion of the Gouin Dam in 1948, the navigability between the Gouin Reservoir and Lake Oskélanéo has become even easier with only two meters of difference in elevation.

Recreational tourism activities are the main economic activity of the sector, followed by forestry.

The Canadian National Railway cuts Oskélanéo Lake east-west in its middle through the village of Oskélanéo, on the west bank.

Route 404 serves the valley of the Oskélanéo River and connects to the Southeast at Route 400, which connects the Gouin Dam and the village of Parent, Quebec, also serves the valleys of rivers Jean-Pierre and Leblanc. The former road also serves the peninsula, which stretches north in the Gouin Reservoir on 30.1 kilometres (18.7 mi). A few secondary forest roads are in use nearby for forestry and recreational tourism activities.

The surface of Oskélanéo Lake is usually frozen from mid-November to late April, but the period of safe ice circulation is generally from early December to late March.

== Geography ==
The surrounding hydrographic slopes of Lake Oskélanéo are:
- north side: Oskélanéo River, Bureau Lake (Gouin Reservoir);
- east side: Nemio River, Bouzanquet Bay, De La Galette River (Gouin Reservoir);
- south side: Gosselin River, Douville River, Bazin River;
- west side: Saraana Bay, Mégiscane River, Tessier Lake (Gouin Reservoir).

The Oskélanéo Lake is Haylow Bay advancing westward 2.1 kilometres (1.3 mi) near the mouth of the lake. This lake is mainly fed by the Parker and Froissart streams, as well as by the outlet of Hill Lake (via Haylow Bay) and the outlet (coming from the South) of Marcotte and Bisborne Lakes.

This lake is split in two by a strait (North-South direction) of 5.2 kilometres (3.2 mi), located north of the railway bridge spanning the lake at the height of the village of Oskélanéo.

The mouth of Lake Oskélanéo is located at:

- 8.3 kilometres (5.2 mi) north of the village Oskélanéo, Quebec;
- 41.4 kilometres (25.7 mi) south of the mouth of the Bureau Lake (Gouin Reservoir);
- 56.7 kilometres (35.2 mi) south of the village center of Obedjiwan, Quebec which is located on a peninsula on the north shore of Gouin Reservoir;
- 80.5 kilometres (50.0 mi) south-west of Gouin Dam;
- 106 kilometres (66 mi) west of the village center of Wemotaci, Quebec (north shore of the Saint-Maurice River);
- 195.7 kilometres (121.6 mi) west of downtown La Tuque;
- 283.4 kilometres (176.1 mi) northwest of the mouth of the Saint-Maurice River (confluence with the St. Lawrence River at Trois-Rivières).

From the mouth, the current flows over 149.2 kilometres (92.7 mi) to Gouin Dam, according to the following segments:

- 12.6 kilometres (7.8 mi) north to the mouth of the Oskélanéo River;
- 43.8 kilometres (27.2 mi) to the North crossing the Bureau Lake (Gouin Reservoir);
- 92.8 kilometres (57.7 mi) north-east across Marmette Lake, then south-east to Gouin Dam.
From this dam, the current flows along the Saint-Maurice River to Trois-Rivières.

== Toponymy ==
The toponym "Lac Oskélanéo" was formalized on December 5, 1968, by the Commission de toponymie du Québec, when it was created.

== See also ==
- Saint-Maurice River, a watercourse
- Gouin Reservoir, a body of water
- Kikendatch Bay, a body of water
- Brochu Lake, a body of water
- McSeeney Lake, a body of water
- Marmette Lake, a body of water
- Bureau Lake (Gouin Reservoir), a body of water
- La Tuque, a city
- List of lakes of Canada
