= Saint-Étienne-des-Grès, Quebec =

Saint-Étienne-des-Grès
- Parish municipality
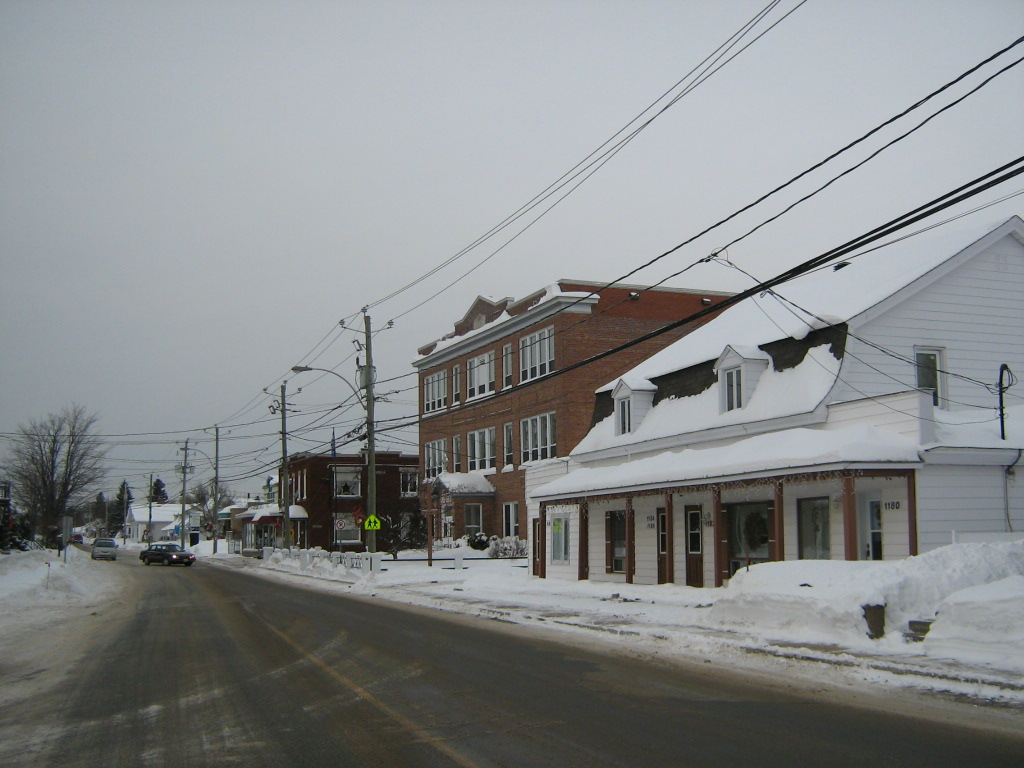

- Coat of arms
- Motto: Sub Pondere Virtus Crescit
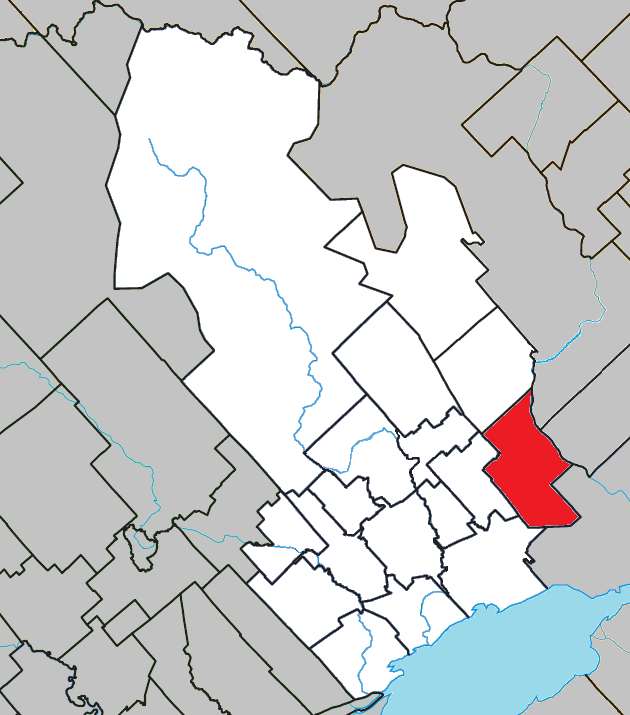
- Location within Maskinongé RCM

- Location in central Quebec
- Coordinates: 46°26′N 72°46′W
- Country: Canada
- Province: Quebec
- Region: Mauricie
- RCM: Maskinongé
- Settled: 1771
- Constituted: April 14, 1859

Government
  - Mayor: Jocelyn Isabelle
  - Fed. riding: Berthier—Maskinongé
  - Prov. riding: Maskinongé

Area
  - Total: 105.85 km^{2} (40.87 sq mi)
  - Land: 104.54 km^{2} (40.36 sq mi)

Population (2021)
  - Total: 4,539
  - Density: 43.4/km^{2} (112/sq mi)
  - Change 2016-21: ▼0.0%
  - Dwellings: 1,945
- Time zone: UTC−5 (EST)
  - Summer (DST): UTC−4 (EDT)
- Postal code(s): G0X 2P0
- Area code(s): 819
- Highways A-55: R-153
- Website: www.mun-stedg.qc.ca

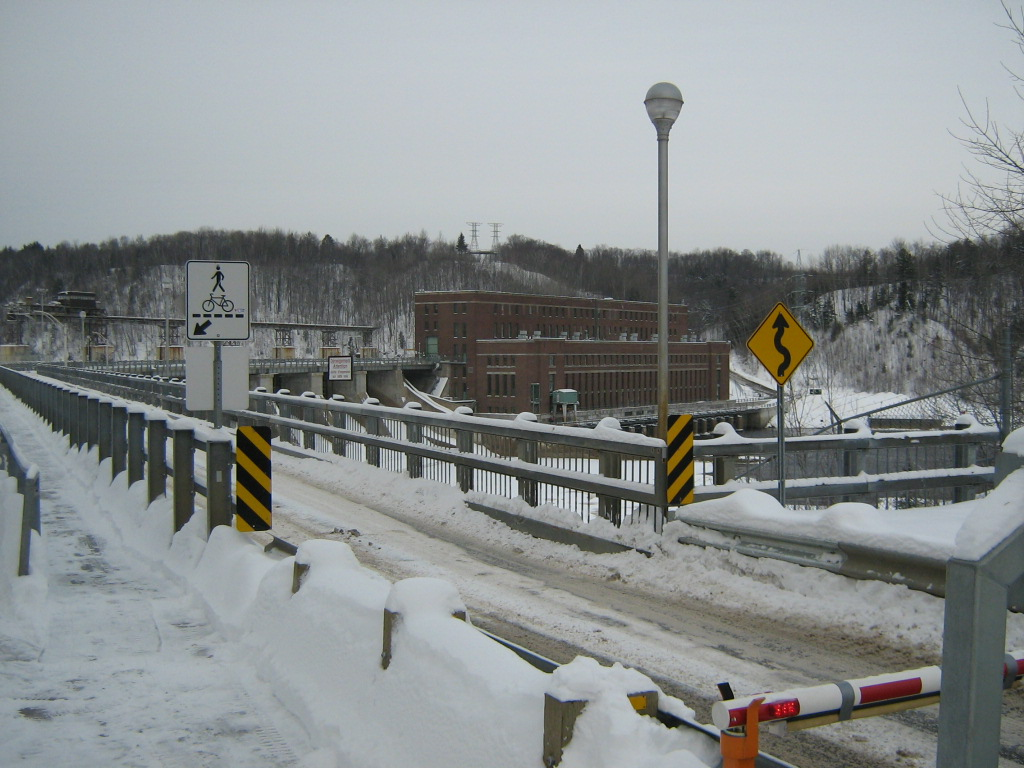
La Gabelle Power Station on the Saint-Maurice River.

Saint-Étienne-des-Grès (French pronunciation: [sɛ̃t‿etjɛn de gʁɛ]) is a parish municipality in the Mauricie region of the province of Quebec in Canada.

Local points of interest include La Gabelle Generating Station, a power plant completed in 1924.

== Demographics ==
In the 2021 Census of Population conducted by Statistics Canada, Saint-Étienne-des-Grès had a population of 4,539 living in 1,874 of its 1,945 total private dwellings, a change of −0% from its 2016 population of 4,541. With a land area of 104.54 km^{2} (40.36 sq mi), it had a population density of 43.4/km^{2} (112.5/sq mi) in 2021.

Historical census populations – Saint-Étienne-des-Grès, Quebec

Year	Pop.	±%
1871	2,574	—
1881	3,119	+21.2%
1891	2,166	−30.6%
1901	1,741	−19.6%
1911	1,688	−3.0%
1921	1,464	−13.3%
1931	1,639	+12.0%
1941	1,776	+8.4%

Year	Pop.	±%
1951	1,833	+3.2%
1956	1,512	−17.5%
1961	1,580	+4.5%
1966	2,010	+27.2%
1971	1,961	−2.4%
1976	2,192	+11.8%
1981	3,005	+37.1%
1986	3,303	+9.9%

Year	Pop.	±%
1991	3,575	+8.2%
1996	3,823	+6.9%
2001	3,833	+0.3%
2006	3,881	+1.3%
2011	4,217	+8.7%
2016	4,541	+7.7%
2021	4,539	−0.0%

Population counts are not adjusted for boundary changes.
Source: Statistics Canada

== Government ==
The mayor is the municipality's highest elected official. Saint-Étienne-des-Grès has had almost thirty different mayors.

List of former mayors:

1. François Carbonneau (1855–1858)
2. Luc Pellerin (1858–1862)
3. François Dargis (1862–1867)
4. Jean-Baptiste Beauchemin (1867–1867)
5. Odilon Larcousière (1868–1869)
6. Euchariste Grenier (1870–1870)
7. Joseph Comeau (1870–1872)
8. Uldoric Brunelle (1872–1874, 1887–1900)
9. Augustin Milette (1875–1877)
10. Simon J. Remington (1877–1884)
11. Joseph Ringuette (1884–1886)
12. Charles Milot (1901–1903)
13. Étienne Laroche (1904–1907)
14. François Chrétien (1907–1910, 1914–1927)
15. Joseph-Edmond Lemire (1910–1914)
16. J.-Félix Saint-Onge (1927–1929)
17. Joseph Marcotte (1929–1937)
18. Anselme Bourassa (1937–1953)
19. J.-Arthur Lemire (1953–1965, 1968–1973)
20. Louis-Philippe Plourde (1965–1967)
21. Louis-Alphonse Bournival (1967–1968)
22. Roger Bellemare (1973–1975)
23. Joseph Duplessis (1975–1977)
24. Jules Bellemare (1977–1989)
25. François Chénier (1989–2001, 2005–2008)
26. Luc Massé (2001–2005)
27. Robert Landry (2008–2021)
28. Nancy Mingault (2021–2025)
29. Jocelyn Isabelle (2025–current)

Officially, municipal elections in Saint-Étienne-des-Grès are on a non-partisan basis.

== See also ==
- La Gabelle Generating Station
