= Île Anselme-Fay =

Ile Anselme-Fay
- Interactive map of Ile Anselme-Fay
- Location: Shawinigan, Quebec, Canada
- Coordinates: 46.5733°N 72.70662°W
- Type: River
- Total height: 15 ft (4.6 m)
- Watercourse: St-Maurice River
- Average flow rate: 730 m^{3}/s (26,000 cu ft/s)

Île Anselme-Fay is an island in Shawinigan, Canada. The island is surrounded by the Saint-Maurice River.

== See also ==
- List of Quebec rivers
- Saint-Maurice River
