= Pierre Gabelle =

French politician

Pierre Gabelle (1917–1982) was a French political figure during the Fourth Republic and Fifth Republic. Pierre Gabelle was born on 29 November 1917 in Cour-Cheverny in the department of Loir-et-Cher. He died on 17 June 1982 at Chesnay (Yvelines).

He held the position of MP from Loiret in the first and second National Constituent Assemblies of 1945 and 1946, after World War II, and was re-elected to the National Assembly until 1962.

== Biography ==
Gabelle was a turner-mechanic from 1923 to 1930 and an accountant from 1935 to 1945 for equipment manufacturer Rivierre-Casalis. He also became a member of the French Confederation of Christian Workers (CFTC) from 1926.

He became director of the regional daily La République du Centre in Orléans upon Libération.

He was elected as an MP from Loiret in the second district of Loiret in the election on 21 October 1945 and sat on the parliamentary group Popular Republican Movement (MRP). He retained his seat until 9 October 1962.

Pierre Gabelle died at Chesnay on 17 June 1982 at the age of 74.
