= Oskélanéo =

- Unincorporated hamlet
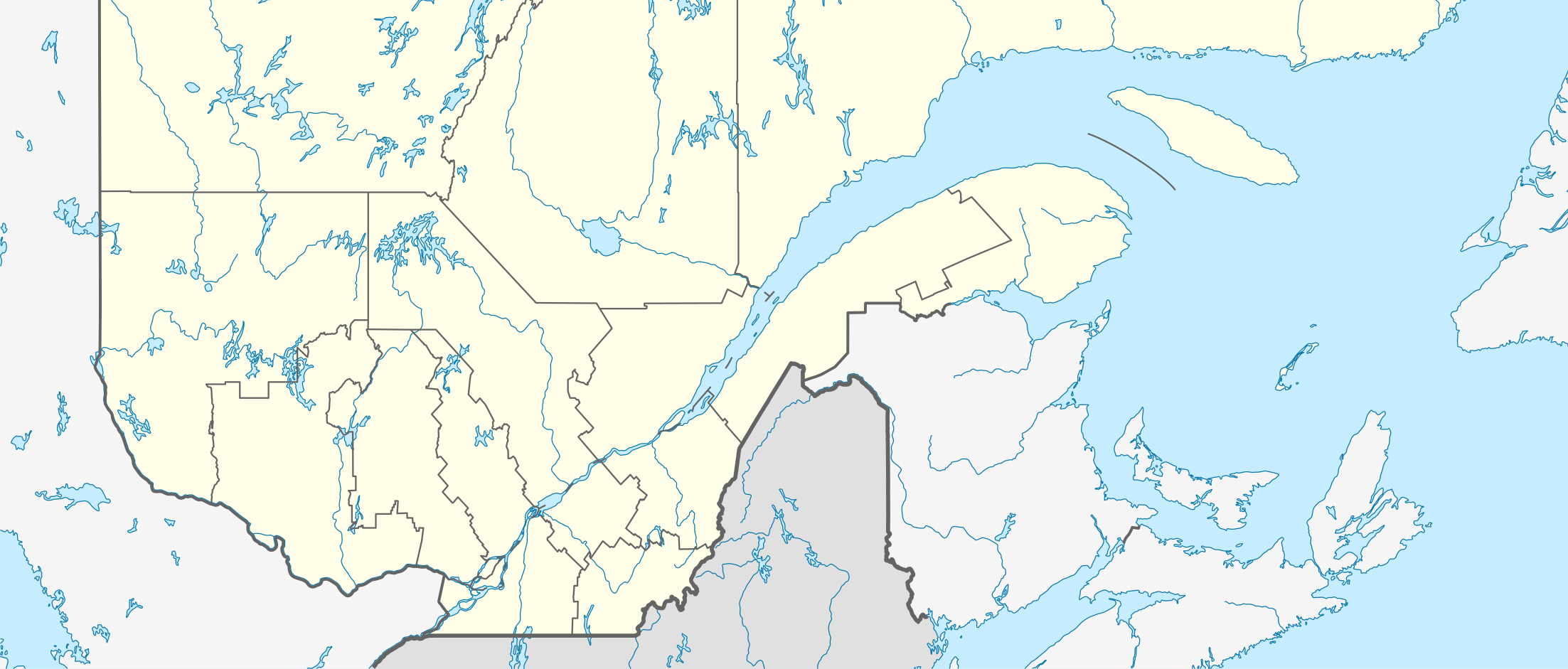
- Location within Quebec South
- Coordinates: 48°06′44″N 75°11′46″W
- Country: Canada
- Province: Quebec
- Region: Mauricie
- Municipality: La Tuque
- Settled: 1910
- Elevation: 410 m (1,350 ft)
- Time zone: UTC-5 (EST)
  - Summer (DST): UTC-4 (EDT)
- Area code: 819

Oskélanéo is a community in northern Quebec, Canada, within the boundaries of the City of La Tuque. It is located along the Canadian National Railway between Clova and Parent, on the shores of Lake Oskélanéo. The community is named after the eponymous lake and stream, meaning "bones" in the Algonquin language.

The little hamlet is home to a few hunting and fishing outfitters. The Via Rail train to the Abitibi will stop at the Oskelaneo River Station on request.

== History ==
Oskelaneo formed when the National Transcontinental Railway was built through the area in 1910. It was also known as Oskelaneo River after its railway station designation. It became a supply depot for and access point to the Rupert River, Lake Mistassini, and other areas of northern Quebec. The canoe brigades of the Hudson's Bay Company travelled through Oskélanéo River to supply trading posts at Obiduan, Chibougamau, and Mistissini. Furthermore, the community was also used by prospectors, local Atikamekw Amerindians, and even some recreational canoeists as an access point to the north, making the Oskelaneo canoe route so popular that it prompted the construction of manually operated locks on the Oskélanéo River between the rail station and Bureau Lake (now flooded by Gouin Reservoir).

Oskelaneo also became a forestry centre and in 1917, a sawmill was built. In 1921, a post office opened. It gained further prominence that same year when the forest fire protection service started using Oskelaneo as a base, and in 1924, when an airbase was established for aerial surveying and transport. In 1926, the HBC opened a post in the community.

By the beginning of World War II, Oskelaneo went into decline. The sawmill was demolished and the airbase was no longer used, although the HBC built a new store in 1945. Circa 1948, the road to Chibougamau was completed, which rendered the canoe route through Oskélanéo River immediately obsolete. The last canoe brigade to Mistissini ran in 1948. The community retained some use as an access point to the Gouin Reservoir, but lost this purpose too once logging roads reached the area. In 1956, Oskelaneo still counted 29 families and a total of 119 persons, mostly forestry workers. In 1962, the HBC closed its general store and in 1973, the post office closed as well.

Until March 2003, Oskelaneo was within the Obedjiwan Unorganized Territory, and thereafter became part of the new City of La Tuque when Le Haut-Saint-Maurice Regional County Municipality was dissolved.

== See also ==
- Oskélanéo Lake
