= La Gabelle generating station =

Hydroelectric power station in Quebec

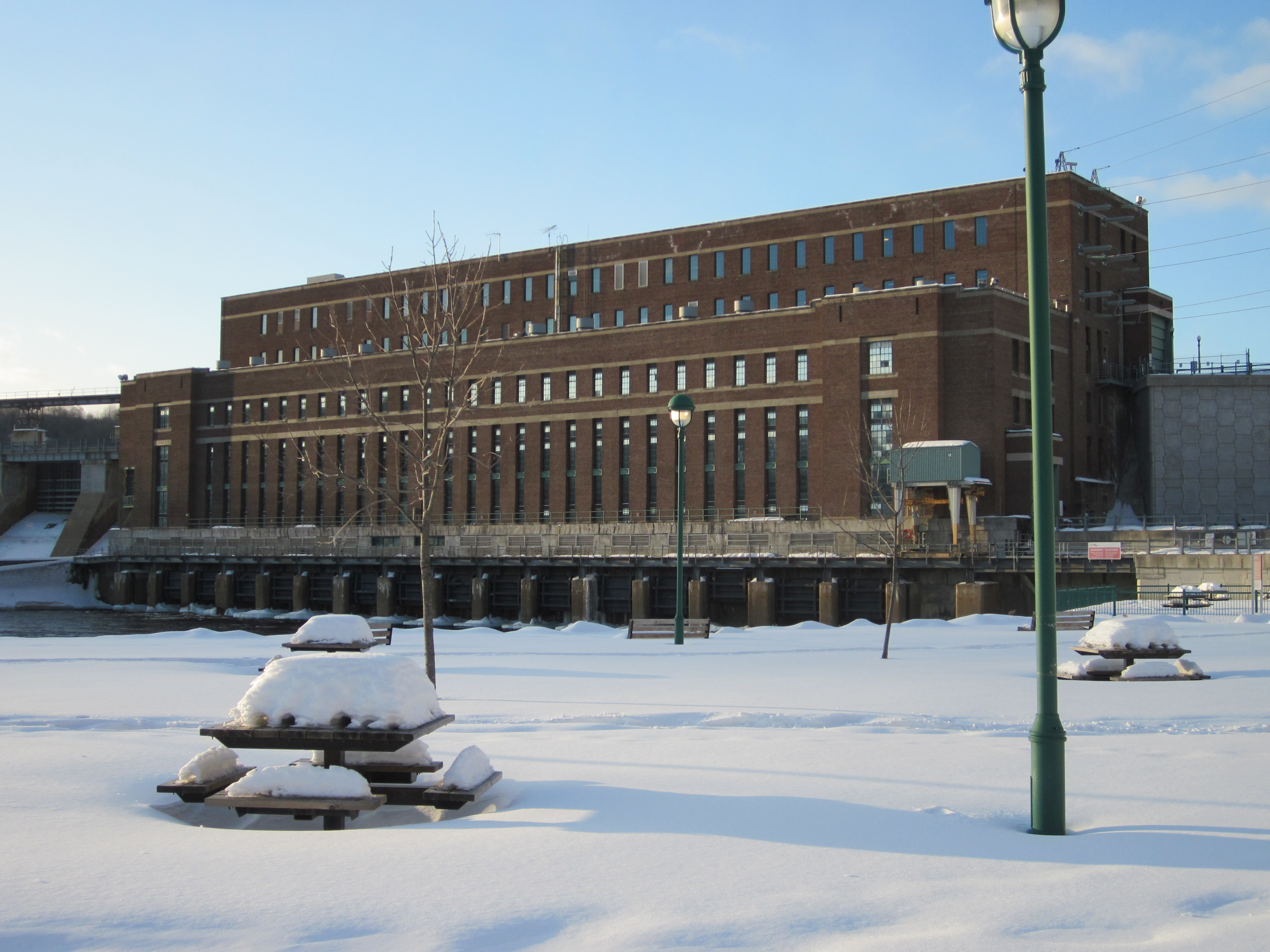
- La Gabelle hydroelectric generating station in 2012
- Country: Canada
- Location: Saint-Étienne-des-Grès
- Coordinates: 46°26′54″N 72°44′32″W
- Commission date: 1924
- Owner: Hydro-Quebec
- Operator: Hydro-Quebec

Tidal power station
- Crosses: Saint-Maurice river

Power generation
- Units operational: Kaplan
- Nameplate capacity: 129 MW
- Annual net output: ? MWH

External links
- Commons: Related media on Commons

The La Gabelle generating station is a hydroelectric dam built on the Saint-Maurice River, in Quebec, in Canada. Property of Hydro-Québec, it was commissioned in 1924 with the first four generating units, in addition a fifth in 1931.

The dam is concrete-gravity type and has a holding capacity of 900 000 cubic meters of water. Integrating a hydroelectric plant, the dam is located on the lower falls (18 metres (59 ft) in height) harvested on the Saint-Maurice River.

== Geography ==
This power plant is the first (most downstream) of the nine hydroelectric operating plant on the river. This hydropower plant is located on the border between Saint-Étienne-des-Grès (row 1, west side of the river) and Notre-Dame-du-Mont-Carmel ("rang des grais", East side of the river). This power plant was erected at 21.5 kilometres (13.4 mi) upstream of the mouth of Saint-Maurice River and 6.5 kilometres (4.0 mi) downstream of the power plants Shawinigan- 2 and Shawinigan- 3.

The Route Verte ("Green route" in English) (bike and pedestrian lane) no. 4 which pass through this dam of the Saint-Maurice River is used to connect the two communities.

The "rivière Cachée" (hidden river) in Notre-Dame-du-Mont-Carmel flows west and empties through the east bank of Saint-Maurice River 0.75 km upstream of the dam.

== Toponymy ==
During the French regime in "Nouvelle-France", the French toponym "La Gabelle" designates a place around the falls. At this height on the Saint-Maurice River, travelers should do a portage to go upstream of the rapids. This place was a necessary stop which was favorable for trade between natives and French Canadians. A rail stop named "La Gabelle" was arranged nearby.

According to Napoleon Caron, "La Gabelle" was once a site for well attended deals: Indians descended from the North with their furs. The French went up to the first major rapids with their goods in order to trade. There was a great trade, the Government had to collect taxes there, hence the name Gabelle... "

Given its distinctive architecture, the hydroelectric plant was chosen to illustrate a Canadian postage stamp in 1946.

The names "Barrage de La Gabelle" (La Gabelle dam) et "Centrale de La Gabelle" (La Gabelle Power Plant) were recorded September 18, 2002 the Bank of place names in Commission de toponymie du Québec (Geographical Names Board of Québec).

== See also ==
- Maskinongé Regional County Municipality
- Les Chenaux Regional County Municipality
