= Saint-Quentin Island =

Island in Trois-Rivières, Quebec, Canada

Native name: Île Saint-Quentin
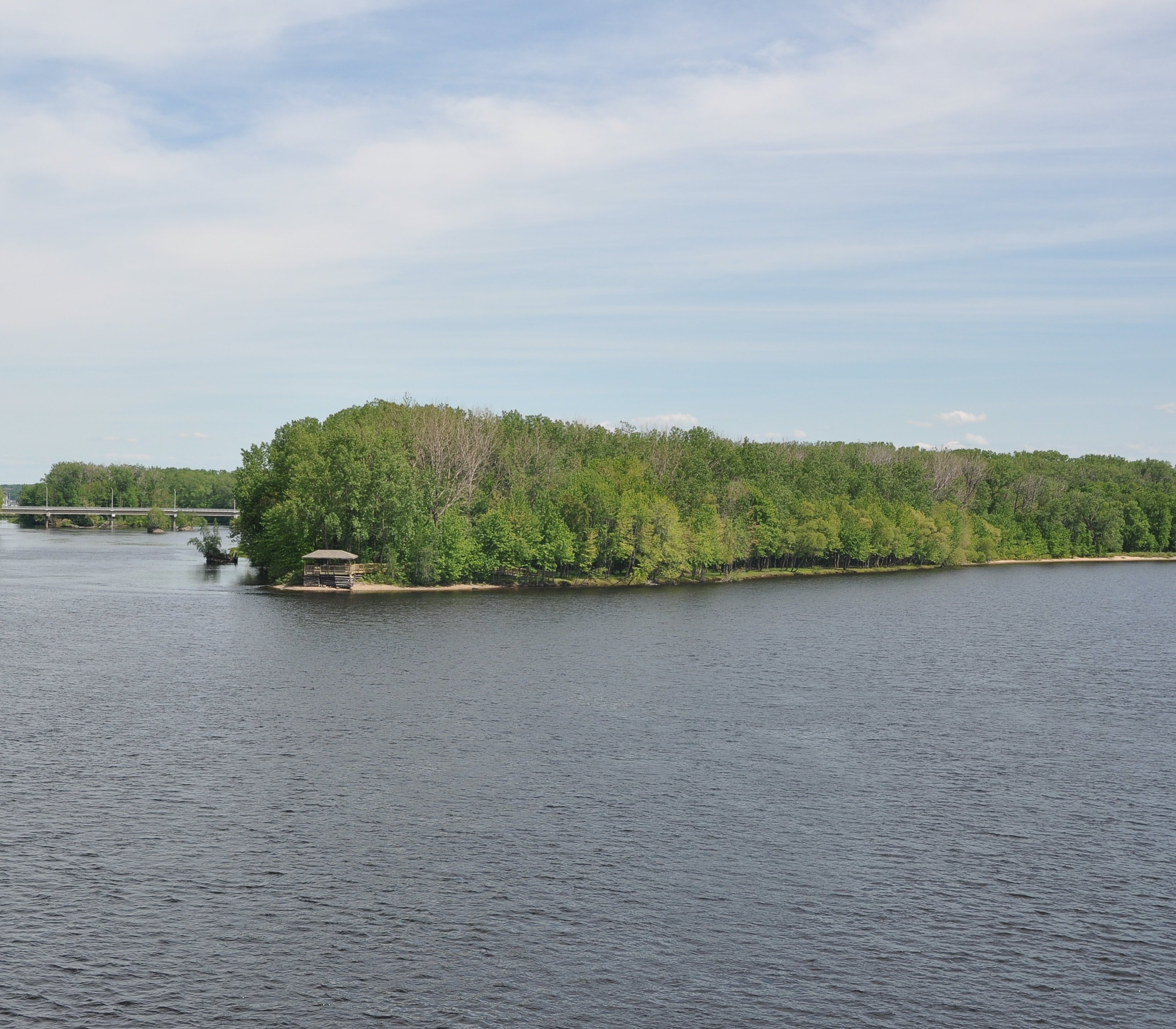

- Location within Quebec

Geography
- Location: Saint-Maurice River
- Coordinates: 46°21′09″N 72°31′39″W
- Area: 0.38 km^{2} (0.15 sq mi)

Administration
- Canada
- Province: Quebec

Demographics
- Population: 0 (2011)

Additional information
- Official website: Parc de l'Île-Saint-Quentin (Saint-Quentin Island Park)

Saint-Quentin Island (French: Île Saint-Quentin, pronounced [il sɛ̃ kɑ̃tɛ̃]) lies at the confluence of the Saint-Maurice River and Saint Lawrence River in the city of Trois-Rivières, Quebec, Canada. The island, along with Saint-Christophe and De La Poterie islands, are each named after one of the three channels formed by the Saint-Maurice River at its mouth with the St. Lawrence, where it flows between two islands.

It owes its name to judge Quentin Moral, known as "Saint-Quentin", who was a fur trader and one of the first dealers on this island. It is now a center of popular outdoor activities and leisure at the hearth of city. The patron saint of the island is Quentin de Rome.

== History ==
It was first inhabited by an Algonquian tribe which raised corn (called blé d'Inde –'Indian wheat' in Quebec slang). Subsequently, on 7 October 1535, Jacques Cartier planted a cross on the island proclaiming French sovereignty of this territory. It was not until a hundred years later that Jesuit priest Paul Le Jeune noticed the ruins of a fence and some Native American farmland cleared when Indians grew corn.

Thus June 2, 1647, Governor Charles Jacques Huault de Montmagny allowed François Marguerie, Jean Veron de Grandmesnil and Claude David to clear the island. The island then called Grandmesnil island and was designated for cultivation by commoners. But Véron de Grandmesnil died shortly after and the island was renamed "Île de la Trinité" (Trinity Island) for a time. François Marguerie had bequeathed his land to his sister Marie in 1652, who at the time was married to her second husband, Quentin de Moral. In the early 1660s the island was permanently renamed Île Saint-Quentin. The natural environment of the island remained virtually unchanged, and it remained practically unused from the 18th century until the end of the 19th.

In the 1930s, the recreational aspect of the island became important. At the time it belonged to Quebec Savings and Trust Company Limited and the Canada Power and Paper Corporation and became the subject of a bid from the City in 1933, but it was not until 3 November 1947, that the land became part of the city. For a time, it served as a training camp for the Royal Canadian Navy. Services were gradually introduced in 1950.

The park and the beach were officially inaugurated on 24 June 1962 before a crowd of 5,000. By year end, the island attracted over 100,000 visitors. Since then, the island has undergone several improvements, including a marina, a bike path, an interpretative trail, an ice-skating rink and a campground. Various events and festivals are held annually on the island.

== Previous names ==
- Île Saint-Quentin, named after Judge Quentin Moral
- Île aux Cochons (Pigs Island)
- Île de Grandmesnil, named after Jean Véron Grandmesnil
- Île de la Trinité (Trinidad Island)
- Île Maillet
- Île Martel
- Îles George Baptist

== Festivals and Events ==
- Symposium of painting
- Movies of the Island (Outdoor movie projection, at dusk)
- Beach Party "La Plage" (The Beach)
- La Playa "Beach Club"
- Family Festival of Saint-Quentin Island
- International Canoe Classic Mauricie (Arrival)
- The Festival of Colors

== See also ==
- Trois-Rivières
- Saint-Maurice River
- St. Lawrence River
- List of islands of Quebec
