= Gosselin River (Fortier River tributary) =

Gosselin
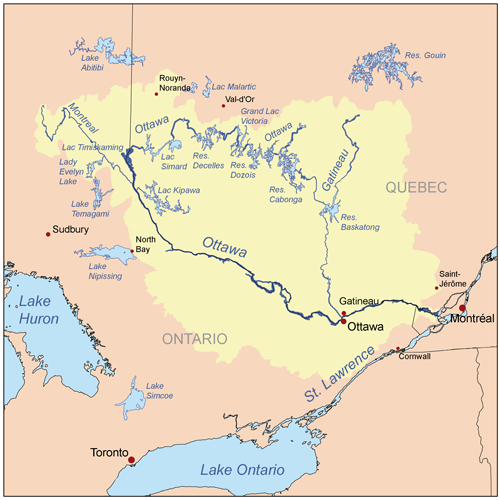
- Map of Ottawa River watershed

Location
- Country: Canada
- Province: Quebec
- Region: Mauricie

Physical characteristics
- Source: Gosselin Lake
  - location: La Tuque (Gosselin Township), Mauricie, Quebec
  - coordinates: 47°50′47″N 75°22′59″W
  - elevation: 446 m (1,463 ft)
- Mouth: Fortier River (Panache River tributary)
  - location: La Tuque (Gosselin Township), Mauricie, Quebec
  - coordinates: 47°49′00″N 75°24′57″W
  - elevation: 400 m (1,300 ft)
- Length: 5.4 km (3.4 mi)

The Gosselin River is a tributary of the North Shore of the Fortier River (Panache River tributary) which flows successively into the Gatineau River, then into the Ottawa River. The Gosselin River flows in the western part of the city of La Tuque, in the administrative region of Mauricie, in Quebec, in Canada.

The course of the river flows entirely in Gosselin Township.

Forestry has always been the dominant economic activity of this hydrographic sub-catchment. The surface of the river is generally frozen from mid-November to mid-April.

== Geography ==
The surrounding hydrographic slopes of the Gosselin River are:
- north side: Douville River, Douville Lake, Clova River;
- east side: Gosselin Lake;
- south side: Fortier River (Panache River tributary);
- west side: Gatineau River.

Gosselin Lake (length: 8.3 kilometres (5.2 mi); elevation: 414 metres (1,358 ft)) is the head lake of the Gosselin River. This lake is located at 49.0 kilometres (30.4 mi) west of the village of Parent at 27.0 kilometres (16.8 mi) southeast of the village of Clova, Quebec through the Canadian National Railway. Gosselin Lake extends to the southwest, almost parallel (on the north-west side) to the Fortier River (Panache River tributary).

From the mouth of Gosselin Lake, the headwaters of the Gosselin River flow southwest and then south, crossing a few lakes. The total length of the Gosselin River is 5.4 kilometres (3.4 mi).

The Gosselin River flows on the North Shore of the Fortier River (Panache River tributary).

== Toponymy ==
The term "Gosselin" is a surname of French origin.

The toponym "Gosselin River" was formalized on December 5, 1968, at the Place Names Bank of the Commission de toponymie du Québec.

== See also ==
- Fortier River (Panache River tributary), a watercourse
- Gatineau River, a watercourse
- La Tuque, a city equivalent to a regional county municipality (RCM)
- List of rivers of Quebec
