= La Trenche Generating Station =

Hydroelectric power station in Quebec

La Trenche Power Station
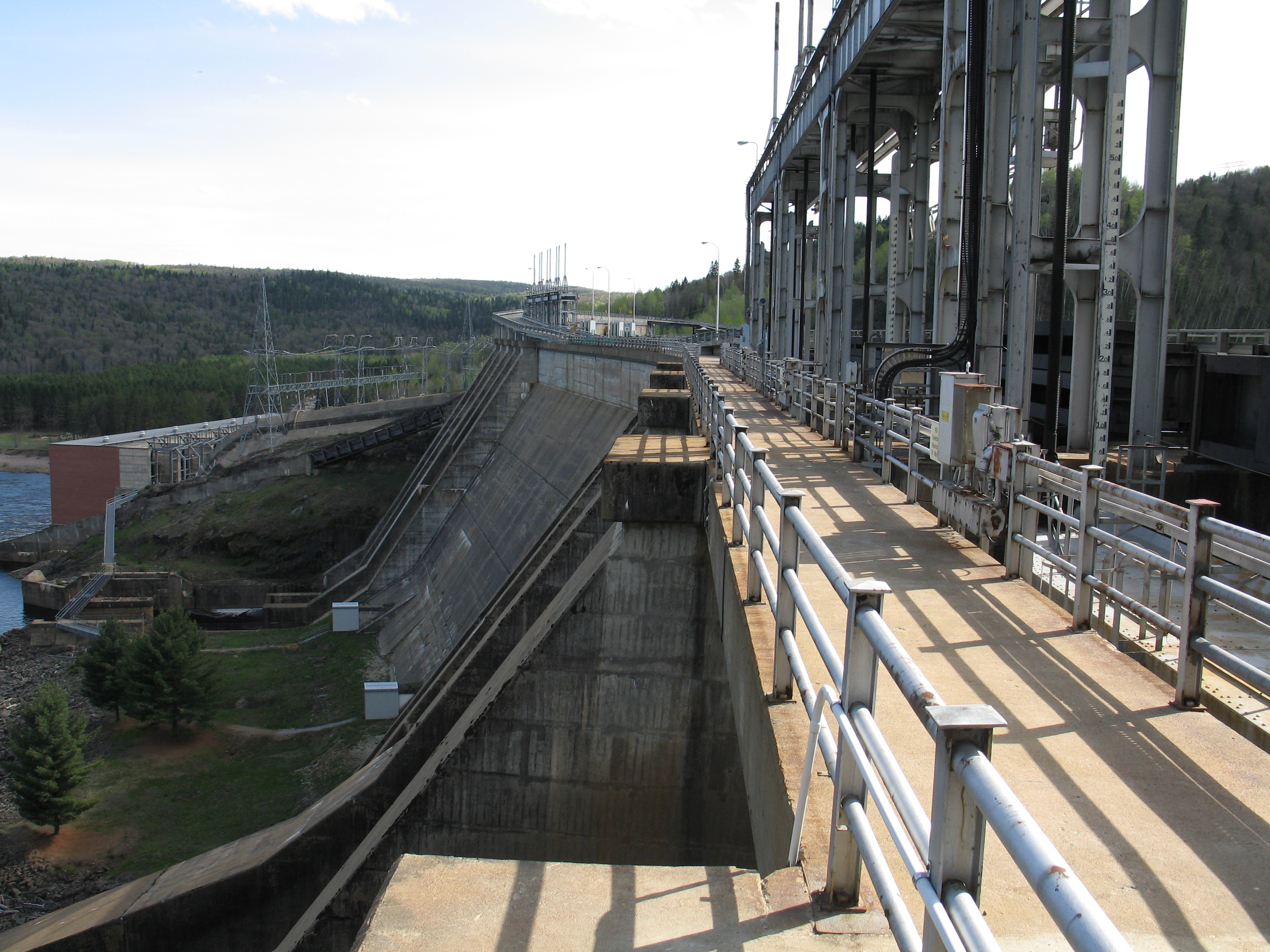
- La Trenche power station was built in 1950
- Country: Canada
- Location: La Tuque
- Coordinates: 47°45′12″N 72°52′44″W
- Construction began: 1950
- Owner: Hydro-Quebec
- Operator: Hydro-Quebec

Tidal power station
- Crosses: Saint-Maurice river

Power generation
- Units operational: Francis-type
- Nameplate capacity: 302 MW (405,000 hp)

External links
- Commons: Related media on Commons

La Trenche Generating Station is a hydroelectric power plant on the Saint-Maurice River and within La Tuque, in Upper-Mauricie, in the administrative region of Mauricie, in Quebec, in Canada. Its construction was completed in 1950. This power station was put into service immediately. It is the central sixth to block the river from its mouth. With its 302 megawatts (405,000 hp), it is the most powerful. Hydro-Québec acquired La Trenche power from the Shawinigan Water & Power Company.

This concrete dam-gravity type has a height of 53 metres (174 ft) and a length 442 metres (1,450 ft). Its retaining capacity is 6 million cubic meters of water at the outlet of Tourouvre lake. The lake is formed by a widening of the Saint-Maurice River because the dam receives water from the Trenche River.

== Toponymy ==
The dam is named after the Trenche River.

The name "Tranche Dam" was officially registered on June 6, 2001, in the Bank of place names of the Commission de toponymie du Québec (Geographical Names Board of Québec).

== Images ==
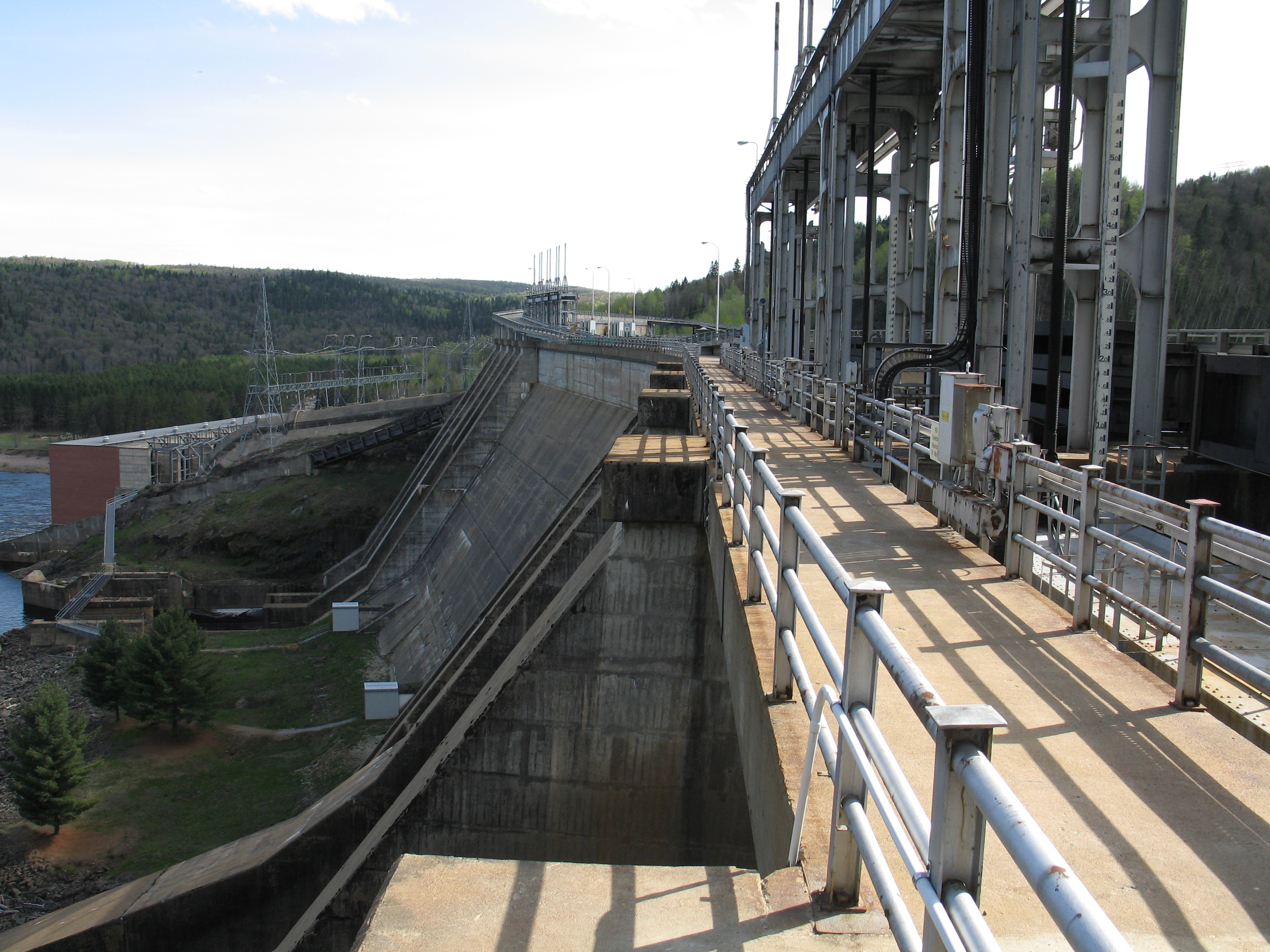
View of "La Trenche power station"

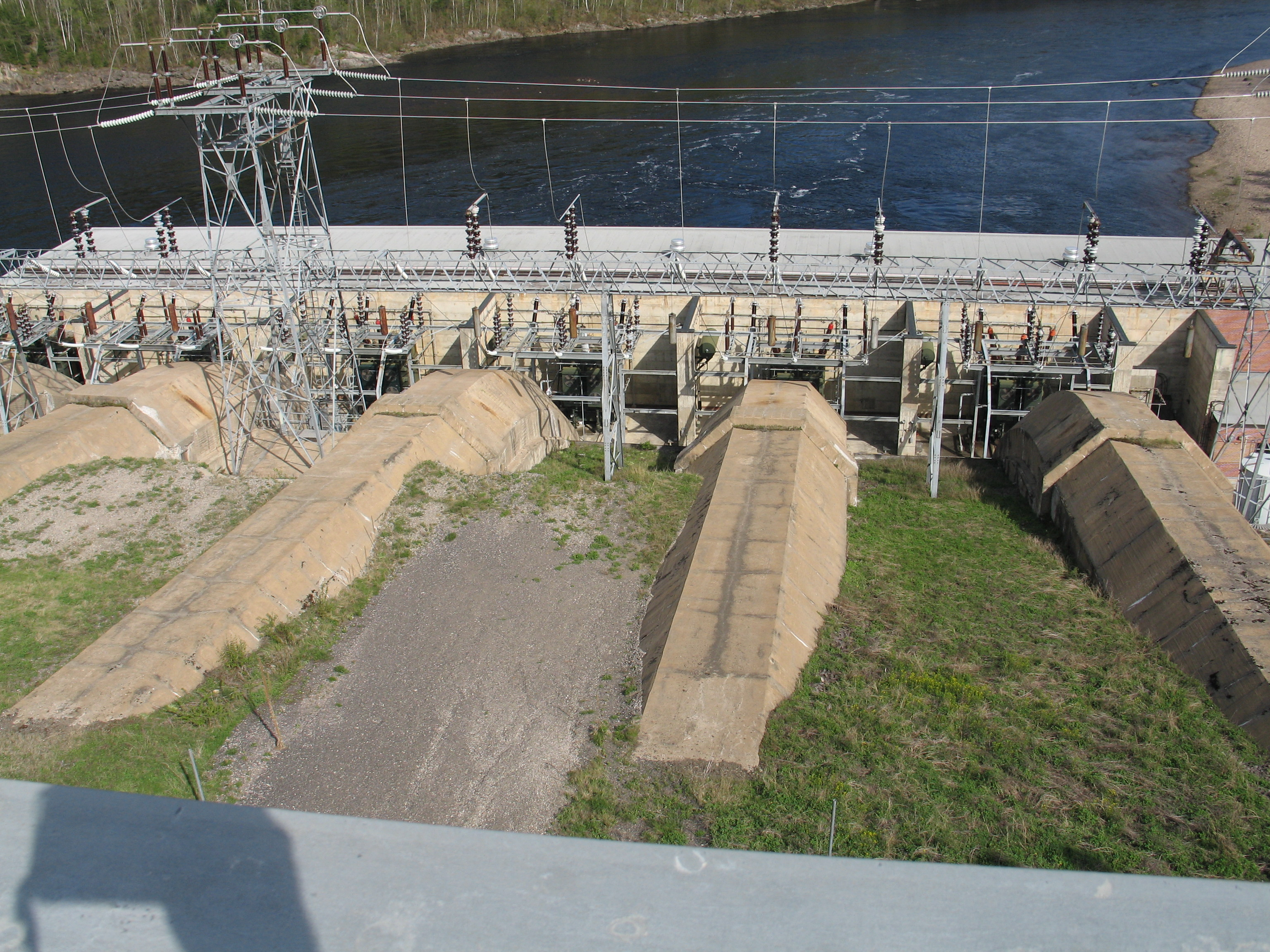
Forced water pipes of "La Trenche power station"

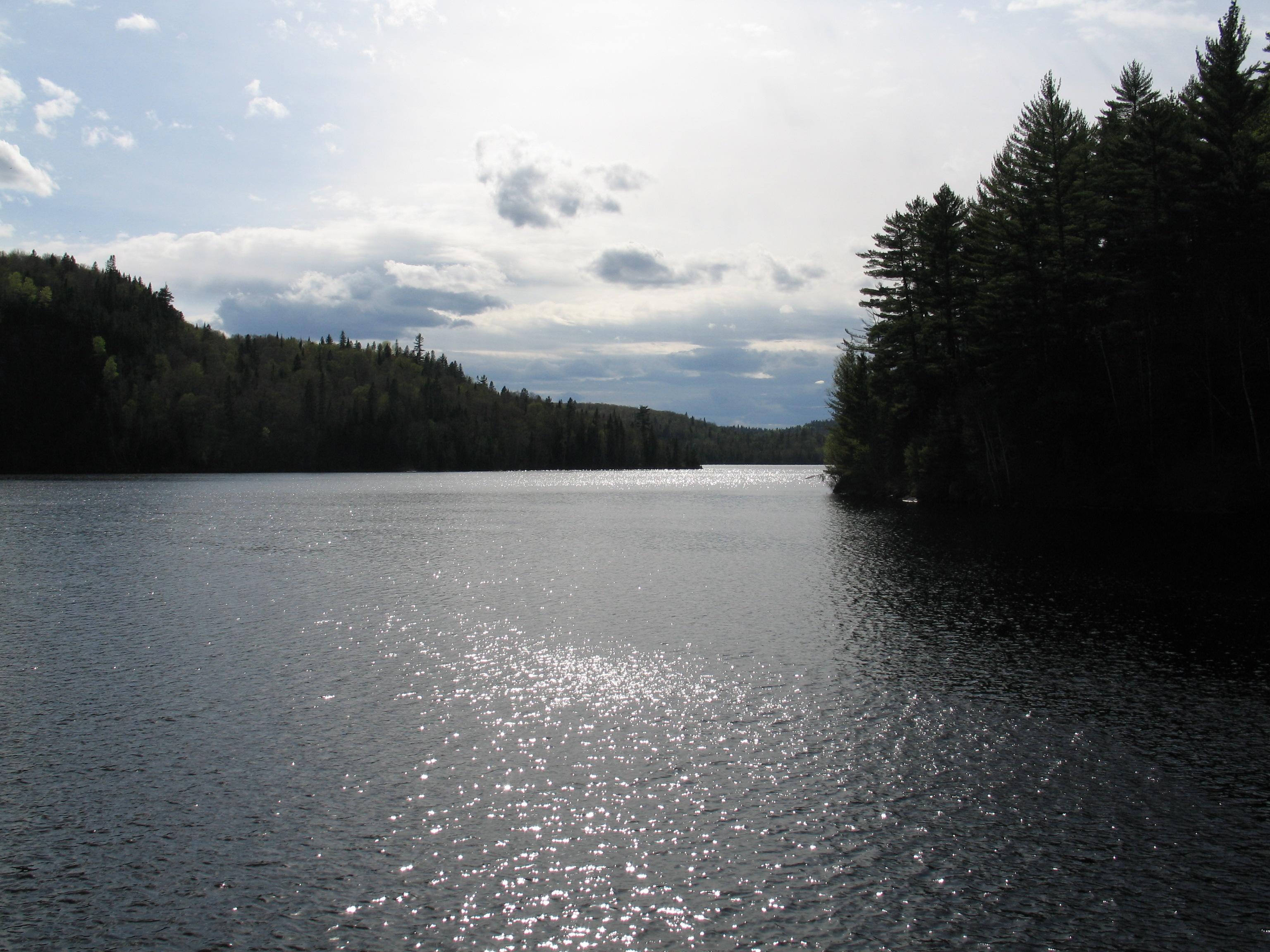
Reservoir of "La Trenche power station"

== See also ==
- Trenche River
- La Tuque, Quebec
- Mauricie
- Saint-Maurice River
