= La Tuque generating station =

Hydroelectric power station in Quebec

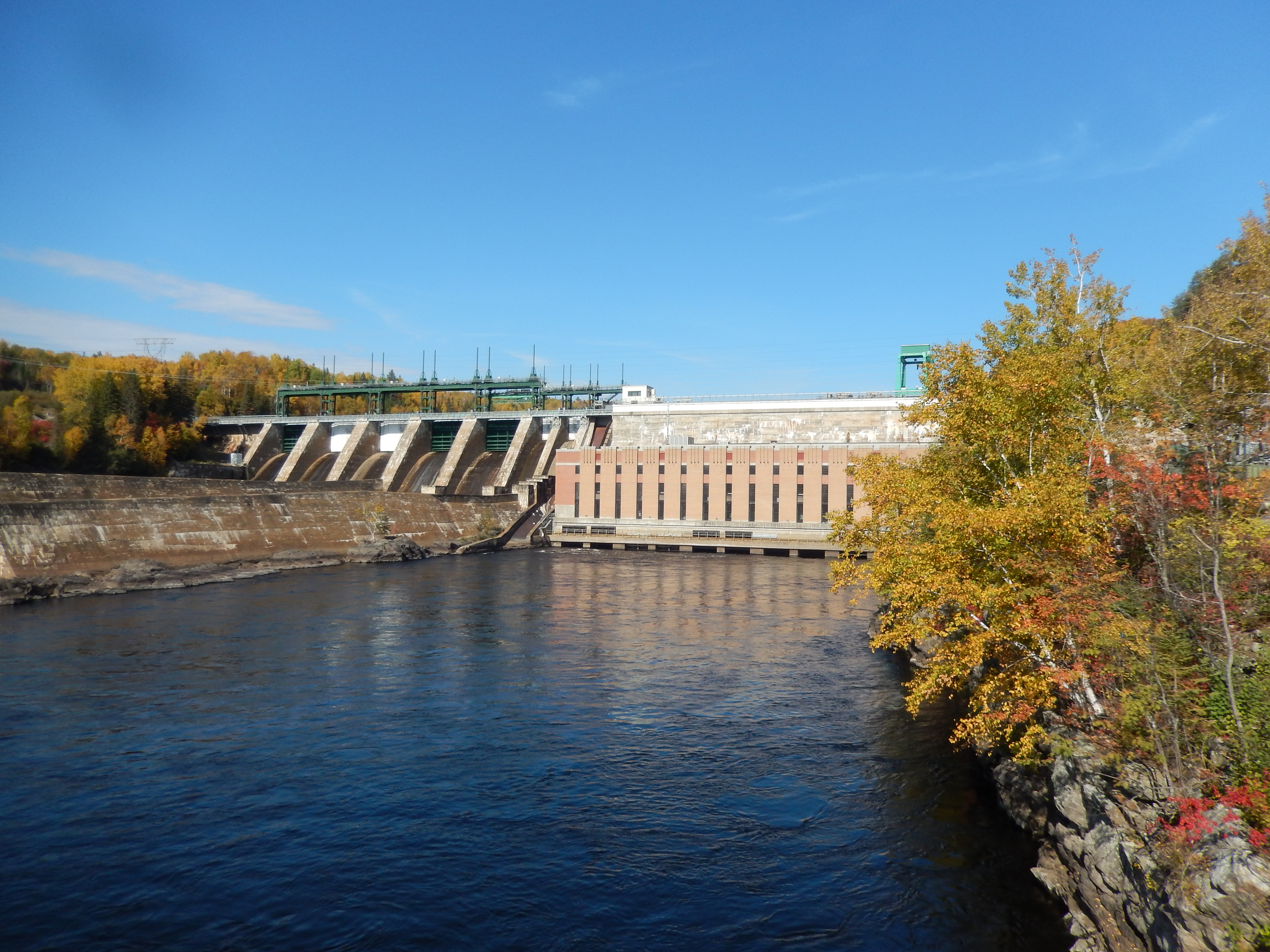
- Country: Canada
- Location: La Tuque
- Coordinates: 47°26′39″N 72°47′58″W
- Status: Operational
- Construction began: 1940
- Commission date: 1955
- Owner: Hydro-Quebec
- Operator: Hydro-Quebec

Power generation
- Units operational: Francis-type
- Nameplate capacity: 294 MW (394,000 hp)

External links
- Commons: Related media on Commons

The La Tuque generating station is a hydroelectric power plant, located on the Saint-Maurice River, at the height of the city of La Tuque, in the province of Quebec, in Canada. This power plant is the property of Hydro-Québec. It is sixth of eleven hydroelectric dams on the river from the mouth.

== Geography ==
With a catchment area of 32,016 square kilometres (12,361 sq mi), the dam forms a large water tank of 800 hectares (2,000 acres). The mouth of the Bostonnais River flows into this great reservoir of Saint-Maurice River whose waters are retained by the dam. The next dam downstream on this river is the Grand-Mère's dam. The distance between these two dams offer a wide range of significant water for recreational boating.
