= River Trenche =

Trenche River
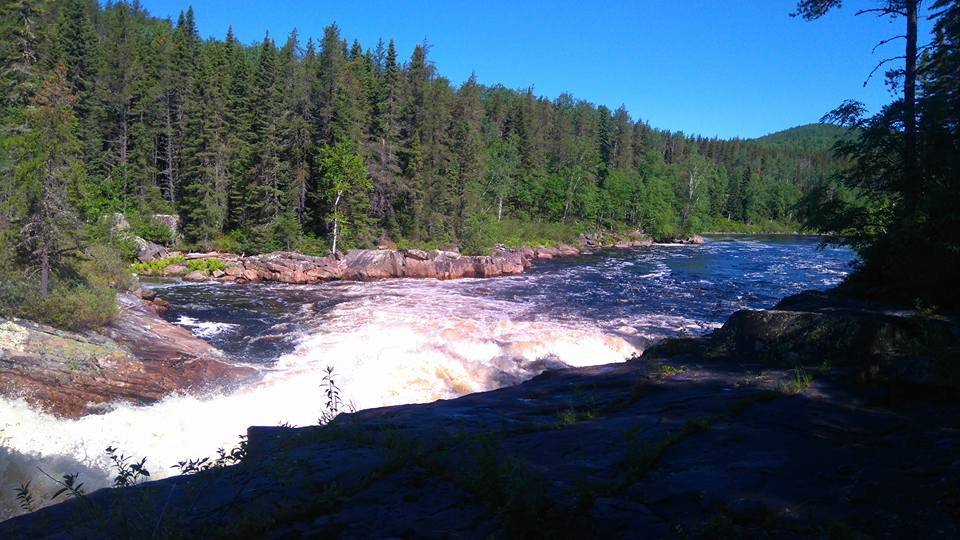

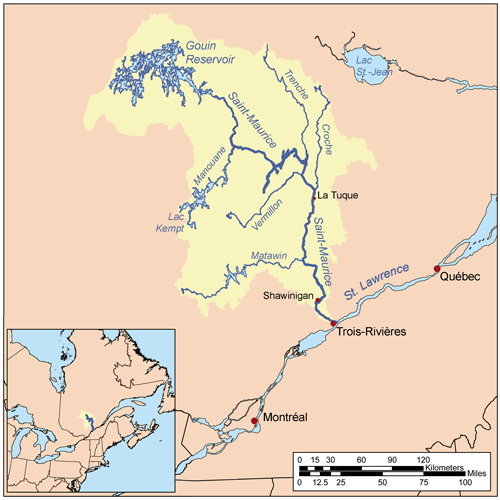
- Main tributaries of Saint-Maurice River
- Native name: La Trenche (French)

Location
- Country: Canada
- Province: Quebec
- Region: Mauricie

Physical characteristics
- Source
  - coordinates: 48°21′15″N 74°06′00″W
- Mouth: Saint-Maurice River
  - coordinates: 47°49′48″N 72°51′42″W
- Length: 150 km (93 mi)

The Trenche River (commonly named “La Trenche” in French) flows in a southwesterly direction through two forested areas. The first is the unorganized territory of Lac-Ashuapmushuan, in the MRC Le Domaine-du-Roy Regional County Municipality, administrative region of Saguenay-Lac-Saint-Jean. Secondly, within La Tuque (urban agglomeration), Upper Mauricie, Quebec, Canada. This river is one of the five most important tributaries of the Saint-Maurice River.

== Geography ==
Trenche river flows between the Saint-Maurice River and Croche River. One has many islands along the way.

On his journey entirely in forest areas, Trenche river has many rapids and falls. The river widened at different places to form many lakes (Pegasus, "à la Boîte" (the box), Lauzon, "Du Chapeau" (the Hat), Tourouvre). Its mouth is located just southeast of Rapide-Blanc, on the left bank of the Saint-Maurice River in northern La Tuque (urban agglomeration). Its mouth flows into Tourouvre lake formed by the Trenche Dam.

Main tributaries of the River Trenche:

- Little River Trenche West (decimal coordinates: -72.91611, 48.29445)
- Trenche East River (decimal coordinates: -72.91167, 48.26805)
- South River Trenche (decimal coordinates: -73.22278, 48.47055)
- Rivière de la Tête à l'ours
- Rivière Raimbault

== Toponymy ==
In 1829, Joseph Bouchette gives to this river the English name of “Ice Chisel” or the noun “slice ice” for cutting ice. This term from the English language in Canada means a tool whose purpose is to punch a hole in the ice. Such a hole can be used including fishing, trapping beaver or take the cup of ice to fill the coolers (ice warehouse for food storage in the hot season). The ice extent in the cooler between the layers of sawdust. The ice cutting increments is normally done in the coldest winter time on the rivers near homes, villages or cities. This practice can also be used to fill the coolers in forest remote sites.

The tool “Tranche” was used by trappers, travelers, hunters for their personal use or for barter practice with Aboriginal people. At the time of the fur trade at the beginning of British rule in Canada, the term “chisel” and “ice chisel” was used by the English traders to designate this tool. Under the influence of Canadian wood runners (said "Courreurs de bois" in French) who worked for the company based in Montreal, caterers of Hudson Bay rather adopted the French term for this tool, rather than as “trench”.

The newspaper summarizing the two trips on the St. Maurice, made in 1889 by Father Napoleon Caron confirms the spelling “rivière Tranche” (River Edge)

The name “River Trenche” was officially registered December 5, 1968 in the register of place names of the Commission de toponymie du Québec (Geographical Names Board of Québec).

== See also ==
- La Tuque
- Saint-Maurice River
- Rapide-Blanc
- Mauricie
- Central Trenche
- Lake Trenche (La Tuque)
- Lake Tourouvre
