= Clova, Quebec =

Clova
- Coordinates: 48°06′32″N 75°21′41″W
- Country: Canada
- Province: Quebec
- Administrative region: Mauricie
- City: La Tuque
- Postal code: G0X 3M0

Clova is a hamlet within the city of La Tuque, in the Mauricie region, in Quebec, Canada. It is also the name of a post office in Clova, a dam and a power plant. Clova is known for the Clova station, built as part of the National Transcontinental Railway, now part of the Canadian National Railway.

Clova was named after its railway station, which was named after the community of Clova in Angus, Scotland. Floatplanes use Clova's seasonal water aerodrome, the Clova/Lac Duchamp Water Aerodrome.

== See also ==
=== Related articles ===
- La Tuque (urban agglomeration)
- Canadian National Railway
