= Douville River =

Douville
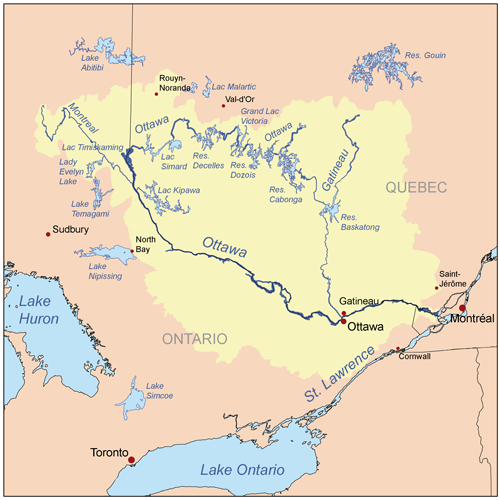
- Map of Ottawa River watershed

Location
- Country: Canada
- Province: Quebec
- Region: Mauricie

Physical characteristics
- Source: Claire Lake
  - location: La Tuque (Fortier Township), Mauricie, Quebec
  - coordinates: 47°58′34″N 75°15′27″W
  - elevation: 444 m (1,457 ft)
- Mouth: Bureau Lake (South Bay)
  - location: La Tuque (Gosselin Township), Mauricie, Quebec
  - coordinates: 47°53′25″N 75°30′12″W
  - elevation: 401 m (1,316 ft)
- Length: 29.6 km (18.4 mi)

The Douville River is a tributary of the Gatineau River by the Pain de Sucre Lake, flowing north of the Saint Lawrence River, entirely in the territory of La Tuque, in the administrative region of Mauricie, in Quebec, in Canada.

This stream runs entirely in a small valley in forest area. This area is without resort.

The surface of the Douville River is generally frozen from mid-December to the end of March.

== Geography ==
The Douville River originates at the mouth of a Lake Claire (length: 1.1 kilometres (0.68 mi), altitude: 444 metres (1,457 ft)), in the Township of Fortier, in the territory of La Tuque.

From the mouth of Lake Claire, the Douville River flows over 29.6 kilometres (18.4 mi), according to the following segments:

- 0.7 kilometres (0.43 mi) north to the south shore of an unidentified lake;
- 6.5 kilometres (4.0 mi) southwesterly, crossing Fortin Lake (length: 2.8 kilometres (1.7 mi); altitude: 442 metres (1,450 ft)), up to the mouth;
- 5.8 kilometres (3.6 mi) southerly forming a curve westerly to the northeastern shore of Lac Douville;
- 7.2 kilometres (4.5 mi) southwesterly across Douville Lake (altitude: 430 metres (1,410 ft)) on 1.7 kilometres (1.1 mi), to its mouth;
- 3.8 kilometres (2.4 mi) southwesterly across Young Lake (elevation: 430 metres (1,410 ft)) along its full length to its mouth;
- 5.6 kilometres (3.5 mi) westerly to the confluence of the river.

The Douville River flows into Gosselin Township on the east shore of Pain de Sucre (La Tuque) which is the head lake of the Gatineau River; the latter then pours into the Ottawa River. This confluence of the Douville River is located at:

- 2.0 kilometres (1.2 mi) downstream from the confluence of the Tamarac River (Gatineau River), crossing the Pain de Sucre Lake (La Tuque);
- 3.2 kilometres (2.0 mi) upstream of the mouth of Sugar Loaf Lake (La Tuque);
- 68.8 kilometres (42.8 mi) west of the village center of Parent;
- 154 kilometres (96 mi) north of downtown Mont-Laurier.

== Toponymy ==
The term "Douville" is a family name of French origin.

The toponym "rivière Douville" was formalized on December 5, 1968 at the Commission de toponymie du Québec

== See also ==
- La Tuque, a territory equivalent to a RCM
- Pain de Sucre Lake, a lake
- Gatineau River, a watercourse
- Ottawa River, a watercourse
- St. Lawrence River, a watercourse
- List of rivers of Quebec
