= Simard Lake (Gouin Reservoir) =

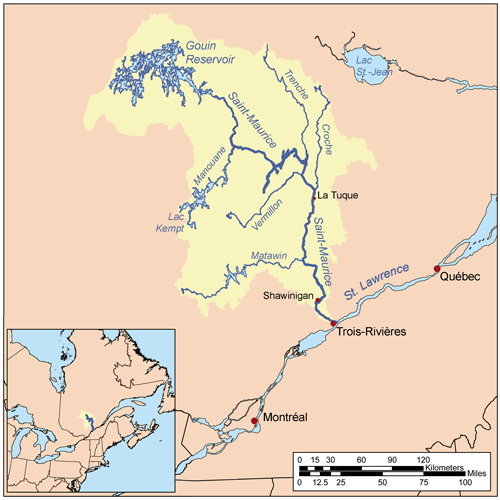
- Watershed of Saint-Maurice River

- Location within Quebec
- Location: La Tuque
- Coordinates: 48°37′43″N 75°010′38″W
- Type: Lake of reservoir
- Primary inflows: Piponisiw River
- Primary outflows: Miller Lake (Gouin Reservoir) (a tributary of Du Mâle Lake (Gouin Reservoir)
- Basin countries: Canada
- Max. length: 4.2 kilometres (2.6 mi)
- Max. width: 2.0 kilometres (1.2 mi)
- Surface elevation: 402 metres (1,319 ft)

The Simard Lake is a freshwater body located in the northwestern part of Gouin Reservoir, within the territory of the town of La Tuque, in the administrative region of Mauricie, in the province of Quebec, in Canada.

This lake extends in the townships of Lacasse (northern part of the lake) and Crémazie (southern part of the lake).

Recreational tourism is the primary economic activity in the area with forestry as secondary. Recreational boating, especially sport fishing, is particularly popular on this water.

The Lake Simard hydrographic slope is served on the side by secondary forest roads connected to the R2046 and R1045 forest roads that connect the village of Obedjiwan, Quebec.

The surface of Lake Simard is usually frozen from mid-November to the end of April, however, safe ice circulation is generally from early December to the end of March.

Water management at the Gouin Dam can lead to significant variations in the water level, particularly at the end of the winter when the water is lowered.

== Geography ==
Before the construction of the La Loutre Dam in 1916, creating the Gouin Reservoir, Lake Simard had a smaller dimension. After the second raising of the waters in 1946 with the development of the Gouin Dam, Lake Simard took its present form.

The main hydrographic slopes near Lake Simard are:

- north side: Piponisiw River, Miller Lake, Plamondon Creek (Gouin Reservoir), Pascagama River, De la Rencontre Creek;
- east side: Miller Lake (Gouin Reservoir), Du Mâle Lake (Gouin Reservoir), Bourgeois Lake (Gouin Reservoir), Toussaint Lake;
- South side: Du Mâle Lake (Gouin Reservoir), Plamondon Bay (Gouin Reservoir), Kaopatinak Pass;
- west side: Plamondon Creek (Gouin Reservoir), Berthelot River, Pascagama River.

With a length of 4.2 kilometres (2.6 mi) (with a deformed outline and several bays, islands and peninsulas), Lake Simard stretches in the North-South direction. This lake is mainly fed by the Piponisiw River, coming from the North.

The Lake Simard is bounded on the east side by a peninsula stretching northward on 5.1 kilometres (3.2 mi) to Miller Lake (Gouin Reservoir), where the current flows through a narrow passage towards the East is located, either to the Du Mâle Lake (Gouin Reservoir). On the west side, a mountain peak rises to an altitude of 505 metres (1,657 ft) at 2.0 kilometres (1.2 mi) from the shore of the lake. The water level of the lake equilibrates with that of the Gouin Reservoir, except when the level is lowered (eg at the end of winter) according to the water management of the Gouin Dam.

The mouth of Lake Simard is located northeast of the lake, at:

- 3.2 kilometres (2.0 mi) west of the mouth of Miller Lake (Gouin Reservoir) (confluence with the Du Mâle Lake (Gouin Reservoir);
- 9.7 kilometres (6.0 mi) north of the exit of the Kaopatinak Pass which separates the Du Mâle Lake (Gouin Reservoir) in two;
- 17.0 kilometres (10.6 mi) south-west of the village center of Obedjiwan, Quebec which is located on a peninsula on the north shore of Gouin Reservoir;
- 86.0 kilometres (53.4 mi) west of Gouin Dam;
- 132 kilometres (82 mi) northwest of the village center of Wemotaci, Quebec (north shore of the Saint-Maurice River);
- 223 kilometres (139 mi) north-west of downtown La Tuque;
- 323 kilometres (201 mi) northwest of the mouth of the Saint-Maurice River (confluence with the St. Lawrence River at Trois-Rivières).

From the mouth of Lake Simard, the current flows over 101.5 kilometres (63.1 mi) to Gouin Dam, according to the following segments:

- 2.3 kilometres (1.4 mi) to North-East, crossing the Miller Lake (Gouin Reservoir), to the mouth;
- 17.3 kilometres (10.7 mi) to the East crossing the Du Mâle Lake (Gouin Reservoir), Bourgeois Lake (Gouin Reservoir) and Toussaint Lake to the South of the village of Obedjiwan, Quebec;
- 81.9 kilometres (50.9 mi) to the east, crossing in particular Marmette Lake, then to the South-East crossing notably Brochu Lake, then going across the Kikendatch Bay until Gouin Dam.
From this dam, the current flows along the Saint-Maurice River to Trois-Rivières where it flows onto the North Shore of the St. Lawrence River.

== Toponymy ==
The term "Simard" is a family name of French origin.

The French toponym "Simard Lake" was formalized on December 5, 1968, by the Commission de toponymie du Québec, i.e. at the creation of this Commission.

== See also ==
- Saint-Maurice River, a watercourse
- Gouin Reservoir, a body of water
- Toussaint Lake, a body of water
- Bourgeois Lake (Gouin Reservoir), a body of water
- Du Mâle Lake (Gouin Reservoir), a body of water
- Piponisiw River, a body of water
- La Tuque, a city
- List of lakes in Canada
