= Du Poète Lake =

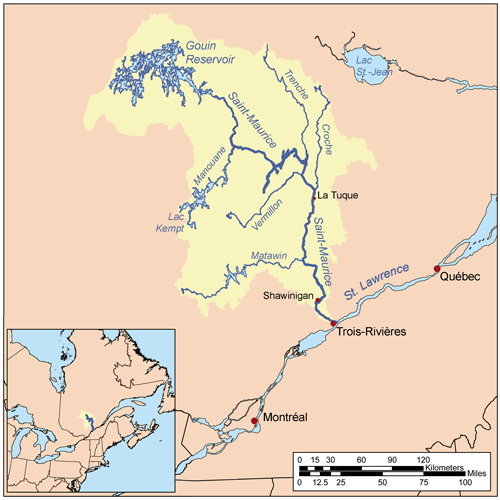
- Watershed of Saint-Maurice River

- Location within Quebec
- Location: La Tuque
- Coordinates: 48°24′55″N 75°30′28″W
- Type: Lake of dam
- Primary inflows: Mégiscane River, Suzie River
- Primary outflows: Mégiscane River (natural outlet), Mégiscanne Channel (actual outlet)
- Basin countries: Canada
- Max. length: 4.0 kilometres (2.5 mi)
- Max. width: 1.2 kilometres (0.75 mi)
- Surface elevation: 406 metres (1,332 ft)
- Islands: 3

Du Poète Lake is a freshwater lake that has become the "Du Poète Reservoir", located west of the Gouin Reservoir, in the territory of the city of La Tuque, in the administrative region of Mauricie, in the province of Quebec, in Canada. This lake extends entirely in the canton of Poisson.

This lake, which is part of the natural course of the Mégiscane River and collects the waters of the Suzie River by artificial deviation. It is famous thanks to the Mégiscane Dam, built to its natural mouth. This dam was erected in 1954 to divert current from Suzie River and from the upper part of the Mégiscane River to an eastbound diversion channel to the Gouin Reservoir, thereby further feeding downstream the hydroelectric power stations on the Saint-Maurice River.

Hydropower is the main economic activity of the sector. Forestry and recreational tourism activities, second.

The "Du Poète Lake" hydrographic slope is served on the North side by a forest road (East-West direction) serving the Mégiscane Dam, as well as by the forest road R1009 (North-South direction) serving the West of the Gouin Reservoir.

The "Du Poète Lake" surface is usually frozen from mid-November to the end of April, but safe ice circulation is generally from early December to late March. This body of water is of the nivo-rainwater type; the water level varies depending on the auxiliary weir east of "Du Poète Lake" and the weir of the Mégiscane Dam.

== Geography ==
The main hydrographic slopes near "Du Poète Lake" are:
- north side: Mégiscane River, Rivas Lake, De La Tête Lake (Mégiscane River), Berthelot River;
- east side: Adolphe-Poisson Bay, Mattawa Bay, Saraana Bay, Du Mâle Lake (Gouin Reservoir);
- South side: Mégiscane River, Provancher Creek, Chassaigne Lake;
- west side: Brécourt Lake, Suzie River, Mégiscane River, Kekek River, Serpent River (Mégiscane River).

Dam at the natural outlet

A Hydro-Québec dam was built in 1954 (and modified between 1992 and 1994) in concrete-gravity at the natural mouth of "Du Poète Lake". It comprises a set of five infrastructures (including two dikes and three dams). With a length of 221 metres (725 ft) and a height of 9.6 metres (31 ft), this dam can hold up to 49 million cubic meters of water."

Dam at the auxiliary weir

Following the construction of the natural mouth of the lake and the one at the auxiliary weir, the "Du Poète Lake" married its current shape resembling a hippocampus looking to the southeast. The Mégiscane dam has a length of 44 metres (144 ft) and a height of 26 metres (85 ft). This dam is designed like "Till" (earth). This lake that holds water from a reservoir of 180 hectares (440 acres) aims to better manage downstream water levels for hydropower.

Lake Poet, with a length of 4.0 kilometres (2.5 mi), collects the waters of the Mégiscane River in the southern part] and on the west side the waters of the Suzie River via the canal coming from Brécourt Lake.

The natural mouth of "Du Poète Lake" is located northwest of the lake, where the Mégiscane Dam has been built, to:

- 1.6 kilometres (0.99 mi) west of the artificial mouth of "Du Poète Lake", going to Martin Lake;
- 4.2 kilometres (2.6 mi) west of the mouth of the second diversion channel (confluence with Piciw Minikanan Bay);
- 14.0 kilometres (8.7 mi) south-west of the mouth of the Adolphe-Poisson Bay (confluence with the Du Mâle Lake (Gouin Reservoir);
- 29.0 kilometres (18.0 mi) south-west of the Kaopatinak Pass which separates the Du Mâle Lake (Gouin Reservoir) in two;
- 49 kilometres (30 mi) south-west of the village center of Obedjiwan, Quebec which is located on a peninsula on the north shore of Gouin Reservoir;
- 104.7 kilometres (65.1 mi) west of Gouin Dam;
- 141.1 kilometres (87.7 mi) west of the village center of Wemotaci, Quebec (north shore of the Saint-Maurice River);
- 230 kilometres (140 mi) north-west of downtown La Tuque;
- 322 kilometres (200 mi) northwest of the mouth of the Saint-Maurice River (confluence with the St. Lawrence River at Trois-Rivières).

From the artificial mouth of Poet's Lake, the current flows over 133.8 kilometres (83.1 mi) to Gouin Dam, according to the following segments:

- 1.4 kilometres (0.87 mi) southeasterly along the first diversion channel to the west bank of an unidentified lake;
- 1.7 kilometres (1.1 mi) north-east across an unidentified lake (length: 3.4 kilometres (2.1 mi); altitude: 405 metres (1,329 ft));
- 250 metres (820 ft) easterly along the second diversion channel to the west bank of Piciw Minikanan Bay;
- 10.9 kilometres (6.8 mi) north-east across the Piciw Minikanan Bay, the Adolphe-Poisson Bay to its mouth;
- 37.6 kilometres (23.4 mi) to the northeast crossing the Du Mâle Lake (Gouin Reservoir), then to the east crossing the Bourgeois Lake (Gouin Reservoir) and the Toussaint Lake to the south of the village of Obedjiwan, Quebec;
- 81.9 kilometres (50.9 mi) to the east, crossing in particular Marmette Lake, then to the South-East crossing notably Brochu Lake, then going across the Kikendatch Bay until Gouin Dam.
From this dam, the current flows along the Saint-Maurice River to Trois-Rivières where it flows onto the North Shore of the St. Lawrence River.

== Toponymy ==
The French toponym "lac du Poète" was formalized on 5 décembre 1968 by the Commission de toponymie du Québec, eg at its creation.

== See also ==
- Saint-Maurice River, a watercourse
- Gouin Reservoir, a body of water
- Du Mâle Lake (Gouin Reservoir), a body of water
- Adolphe-Poisson Bay, a body of water
- Piciw Minikanan Bay, a body of water
- Mégiscane River, a watercourse
- Suzie River, a watercourse
- Mégiscane Dam
- La Tuque, a city
- List of lakes in Canada
