= Miller Lake (Gouin Reservoir) =

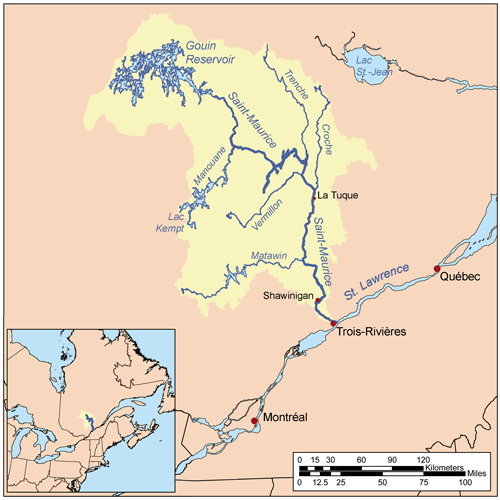
- Watershed of Saint-Maurice River

- Location within Quebec
- Location: La Tuque
- Coordinates: 48°39′30″N 75°09′04″W
- Type: Lake of dam
- Primary inflows: Outlet of Lacasse Lake (Gouin Reservoir), Simard Lake (Gouin Reservoir)
- Primary outflows: Du Mâle Lake (Gouin Reservoir)
- Basin countries: Canada
- Max. length: 3.7 kilometres (2.3 mi)
- Max. width: 0.6 kilometres (0.37 mi)
- Surface elevation: 402 metres (1,319 ft)

Miller Lake is a body of freshwater located in the western part of the Gouin Reservoir, in the territory of the town of La Tuque, in the administrative region of the Mauricie, in the province of Quebec, in Canada.

This lake extends entirely in the canton of Lacasse.

Recreotourism activities are the main economic activity of the sector. Forestry comes second. Recreational boating is particularly popular on this water, especially for sport fishing.

The Miller Lake watershed is served on the north side by some secondary forest roads that have been developed for logging. These forest roads connect north to the R1045 forest road serving the north shore of the Gouin Reservoir.

The surface of Miller Lake is usually frozen from mid-November to the end of April, however, safe ice circulation is generally from early December to late March. Water management at the Gouin Dam can lead to significant variations in the water level, particularly at the end of the winter when the water is lowered. The water level of this bay equilibrates with that of the Gouin Reservoir.

== Geography ==
Before the completion of the construction of the La Loutre Dam in 1916, creating the Gouin Reservoir, Miller Lake had a smaller dimension. After the second raising of the waters in 1946 with the development of the Gouin Dam, Miller Lake became its present form.

The main hydrographic slopes near Miller Lake are:

- north side: De la Rencontre Lake, De la Rencontre Creek, Pascagama River, Plamondon Creek (Gouin Reservoir);
- east side: Du Mâle Lake (Gouin Reservoir), Bourgeois Lake (Gouin Reservoir), Toussaint Lake, Bureau Lake (Gouin Reservoir), Marmette Lake;
- south side: Simard Lake (Gouin Reservoir), Du Mâle Lake (Gouin Reservoir), Bureau Lake (Gouin Reservoir);
- west side: Simard Lake (Gouin Reservoir), Plamondon Creek (Gouin Reservoir), Berthelot River.

With a crab-shaped crescent-shaped length of 3.7 kilometres (2.3 mi), Miller Lake stretches to the northeast. The north and northeast side of the lake has wetlands. This lake feeds in the South-West by the discharge of Simard Lake (Gouin Reservoir) and by the discharge (coming from the North) of Lacasse Lake (Gouin Reservoir).

The southern part of Miller Lake is bounded by the north end of a peninsula that runs northward on 6.6 kilometres (4.1 mi). This peninsula also delimits the west side of Simard Lake (Gouin Reservoir). A narrow bay stretches 1.1 kilometres (0.68 mi) north, more or less parallel to the outlet of Lacasse Lake (Gouin Reservoir).

The mouth of Miller Lake is located northeast of the lake at:

- 10.9 kilometres (6.8 mi) north of the exit of the Kaopatinak Pass which separates the Du Mâle Lake (Gouin Reservoir) in two;
- 14.2 kilometres (8.8 mi) south-west of the village center of Obedjiwan, Quebec which is located on a peninsula on the north shore of the Gouin Reservoir;
- 83.3 kilometres (51.8 mi) west of Gouin Dam;
- 131 kilometres (81 mi) northwest of the village center of Wemotaci, Quebec (north shore of the Saint-Maurice River);
- 221 kilometres (137 mi) north-west of downtown La Tuque;
- 322 kilometres (200 mi) northwest of the mouth of the Saint-Maurice River (confluence with the St. Lawrence River at Trois-Rivières).

From the mouth of Miller Lake, the current flows over 99.2 kilometres (61.6 mi) to Gouin Dam, according to the following segments:

- 17.3 kilometres (10.7 mi) easterly crossing the Du Mâle Lake (Gouin Reservoir), Bourgeois Lake (Gouin Reservoir) and the Toussaint Lake to the east up to the south of the village Obedjiwan, Quebec peninsula;
- 81.9 kilometres (50.9 mi) to the east, crossing in particular Marmette Lake, then to the South-East crossing notably Brochu Lake, then going across the Kikendatch Bay until Gouin Dam.
From this dam, the current flows along the Saint-Maurice River to Trois-Rivières where it flows onto the North Shore of the St. Lawrence River.

== Toponymy ==
The term "Miller" is a family name of English origin.

The French toponym "lac Miller" was formalized on 5 décembre 1968 by the Commission de toponymie du Québec, e.g. at its creation.

== See also ==
- Saint-Maurice River, a watercourse
- Gouin Reservoir, a body of water
- Du Mâle Lake (Gouin Reservoir), a body of water
- Simard Lake (Gouin Reservoir), a body of water
- Lacasse Lake (Gouin Reservoir), a body of water
- La Tuque, a city
- List of lakes in Canada
