= Piponisiw River =

Piponisiw

Location
- Country: Canada
- Province: Quebec
- Region: Mauricie

Physical characteristics
- Source: Unidentified Lake
  - location: La Tuque (Lacasse Township), Mauricie, Quebec
  - coordinates: 48°42′03″N 75°10′44″W
  - elevation: 419 m (1,375 ft)
- Mouth: Simard Lake (Gouin Reservoir)
  - location: La Tuque (Lacasse Township), Mauricie, Quebec
  - coordinates: 48°38′44″N 75°11′04″W
  - elevation: 402 m (1,319 ft)
- Length: 7.2 km (4.5 mi)

The Piponisiw River is a tributary of Simard Lake (Gouin Reservoir) located in the western part of the Gouin Reservoir, flowing entirely into the forest zone in the town of La Tuque, in the administrative region of Mauricie, Quebec, Canada.

The Piponisiw River flows successively in the canton of Lacasse. Forestry is the main economic activity of this valley; recreational tourism activities is the second.

The Piponisiw River valley is served by the R1045 (East-West) road that connects the R1009 (North-South) forest roads on the west side of the Gouin Reservoir and the R2046 (North-South direction) which leads south to the village of Obedjiwan, Quebec. This R1045 road bypasses the northern part of Irinikew Octikwan Lake, crosses the Piponisiw River south of the head lake and heads northeasterly to lake Lacasse and lake Masko Oponapananik.

The surface of the Piponisiw River is usually frozen from mid-November to the end of April, however, safe ice circulation is generally from early December to late March.

== Geography ==
The surrounding hydrographic slopes of the Piponisiw River are:

- north side: lake of the encounter, Pascagama River;
- east side: Du Mâle Lake (Gouin Reservoir), Bourgeois Lake (Gouin Reservoir), Thibodeau Bay, Toussaint Lake, Marmette Lake;
- south side: Du Mâle Lake (Gouin Reservoir), Wacapiskitek Bay, Mattawa Bay, Saraana Bay;
- west side: Plamondon Creek (Gouin Reservoir), Berthelot River, Pascagama River, Mégiscane River.

The Piponisiw River originates at the mouth of an unidentified lake (length: 1.7 kilometres (1.1 mi), altitude: 419 metres (1,375 ft)) Y-shaped. The mouth of this river Head Lake is located in the Center-East part of Lacasse Township, at 0.8 kilometres (0.50 mi) west of the top of a mountain (elevation: 514 metres (1,686 ft)). This mouth is at:

- 6.1 kilometres (3.8 mi) north of the mouth of the Piponisiw River (confluence with Simard Lake (Gouin Reservoir));
- 6.3 kilometres (3.9 mi) northwest of the mouth of Miller Lake (confluence with the Du Mâle Lake (Gouin Reservoir));
- 14.3 kilometres (8.9 mi) west of the mouth of Bourgeois Lake (Gouin Reservoir);
- 18.4 kilometres (11.4 mi) west of the village center of Obedjiwan, Quebec (located on a peninsula on the north shore of Gouin Reservoir);
- 88.7 kilometres (55.1 mi) west of the Gouin Dam erected at the mouth of the Gouin Reservoir (confluence with the Saint-Maurice River).

From the mouth of the head lake, the course of the Piponisiw River flows entirely into forest area on 7.2 kilometres (4.5 mi) according to the following segments:

- 2.9 kilometres (1.8 mi) to the south, including crossing an unidentified lake (length: 1.6 kilometres (0.99 mi); altitude: 414 metres (1,358 ft)) formed by a widening from the river to its mouth;
- 2.6 kilometres (1.6 mi) to the south, including crossing an unidentified lake (length: 1.0 kilometre (0.62 mi); altitude: 413 metres (1,355 ft)), then crossing a second unidentified lake (length: 2.1 kilometres (1.3 mi); altitude: 412 metres (1,352 ft)) on 1.1 kilometres (0.68 mi), to its mouth;
- 1.7 kilometres (1.1 mi) southeasterly across a small lake to the mouth of the river.

The mouth of the Piponisiw River is located on the north shore of Du Mâle Lake (Gouin Reservoir). From there, the current runs on 94.6 kilometres (58.8 mi) until Gouin Dam, according to the following segments:

- 0.8 kilometres (0.50 mi) eastward across Simard Lake (Gouin Reservoir) (length: ; altitude: 402 kilometres (250 mi)), to its mouth;
- 3.7 kilometres (2.3 mi) north-east across Miller Lake (length: 3.3 kilometres (2.1 mi); altitude: 402 kilometres (250 mi)), up to mouth (confluence with the Du Mâle Lake (Gouin Reservoir));
- 6.1 kilometres (3.8 mi) to the east, bypassing a peninsula by the south and an island by the north, to the mouth of Bourgeois Lake (Gouin Reservoir);
- 2.1 kilometres (1.3 mi) easterly crossing Toussaint Lake, to the south of Obedjiwan, Quebec village;
- 81.9 kilometres (50.9 mi) to the East, crossing the Marmette Lake, then to the South-East crossing in particular the Brochu Lake then to the East crossing the Kikendatch Bay until Gouin Dam.

From this dam, the current flows along the Saint-Maurice River to Trois-Rivières.

== Toponymy ==
This hydronym is of aboriginal origin.

The toponym "Piponisiw River" was formalized on September 9, 1981 at the Commission de toponymie du Québec.

== See also ==
- Saint-Maurice River, a watercourse
- Gouin Reservoir, a water body
- Du Mâle Lake (Gouin Reservoir), a water body
- Simard Lake (Gouin Reservoir), a water body
- La Tuque, a territory equivalent to a RCM
- List of rivers of Quebec
