= Suzie River =

Suzie
- Watershed of Nottaway River

Location
- Country: Canada
- Province: Quebec
- Region: Abitibi-Témiscamingue

Physical characteristics
- Source: Suzie Lake
  - location: Senneterre, La Vallée-de-l'Or Regional County Municipality (RCM), Abitibi-Témiscamingue, Quebec
  - coordinates: 48°00′45″N 75°43′41″W
  - elevation: 405 m (1,329 ft)
- Mouth: Mégiscane River via Du Poète Lake (Mégiscane River)
  - location: Senneterre, La Vallée-de-l'Or Regional County Municipality, Abitibi-Témiscamingue, Quebec
  - coordinates: 48°24′53″N 75°30′52″W
  - elevation: 405 m (1,329 ft)
- Length: 71.4 km (44.4 mi)

Basin features
- Tributaries
  - left: (upstream); outlet of France Lake; Chênevert River.
  - right: (upstream); outlet of Frigon Lake; outlet of Lorette Lake; outlet of Frank Lake.

The Suzie River is a tributary of the Mégiscane River flowing into the municipality of Senneterre in La Vallée-de-l'Or Regional County Municipality (RCM), in the administrative region Abitibi-Témiscamingue, in the province of Quebec, in Canada.

The Suzie River crosses the townships Jalobert, Bourgmont, Bongard, Logan and Bernier. The course deviated by the dams flows rather in the canton of Brécourt via Lake Brécourt.

The Suzie River flows entirely on forest land north-east of the La Vérendrye Wildlife Reserve and on the west side of Gouin Reservoir. Forestry is the main economic activity of this hydrographic slope; recreational tourism activities, second. The surface of the river is usually frozen from mid-December to mid-April.

== Geography ==
The "Dictionnaire des Rivières et des Lacs de la province de Québec” (English: “Dictionary of Rivers and Lakes of the Province of Quebec”), 1914 edition, indicates that: "Susie, (River). - In the upper part of Saint-Maurice River. It flows, according to A. J. Lacoursière, A. G. (1912) through a slightly undulating and little forested country. The territory bordering it is almost uncultivated, and the woods that dominate are birch and cypress. His course is about 45 miles (72 km). It receives the waters of several lakes full of fish."

The Suzie River rises at the mouth of Lake Boulevard (length: 0.85 kilometres (0.53 mi); maximum width: 0.3 kilometres (0.19 mi); altitude: 442 metres (1,450 ft) ). A mountain peak of 470 metres (1,540 ft) is located on the east side of the lake.

This head lake is located at:

- the west of the watershed with the hydrographic subsurface of a creek flowing southward to Chouart Lake, which is the head lake of the Chouart River, flowing towards the south;
- East of the watershed with the Moon Lake watershed, which flows successively to Lake Shannon and Lake Chaudillon. These bodies of water are the head of the Camachigama River.

The mouth of Lake Boulevard is located at 50.6 kilometres (31.4 mi) south of the confluence of the Suzie River with Du Poète Lake (Mégiscane River) at 120.1 kilometres (74.6 mi) east of downtown from Senneterre, to 83.7 kilometres (52.0 mi) west of the village center of Parent and to 18.3 kilometres (11.4 mi) south of the Canadian National Railway.

The main hydrographic slopes near the Suzie River are:

- North side: Mégiscane River, Bernier Lake, Pascagama Lake;
- East side: Du Poète Lake (Mégiscane River), Tamarac Lake, Tamarac River (Gatineau River);
- South side: Chouart river, Festubert River;
- West side: Chênevert River, Hudson Creek, Camachigama River, Jalobert Lake, Kekek River, Mégiscane River.

From the mouth of Lake Boulevard, the Suzie River flows over 71.4 kilometres (44.4 mi) according to the following segments:

Upper Suzie River (segment of 14.1 kilometres (8.8 mi))

- 1.7 kilometres (1.1 mi) north through Bibeault Lake (elevation: 439 metres (1,440 ft)) on 1.3 kilometres (0.81 mi) to its mouth;
- 1.5 kilometres (0.93 mi) north across Lake Gertrude (elevation: 437 metres (1,434 ft)) on 1.2 kilometres (0.75 mi) to its mouth;
- 3.7 kilometres (2.3 mi) northeasterly across Lee Lake (elevation: 437 metres (1,434 ft)) onto 0.8 kilometres (0.50 mi), then continuing to the bottom a bay on the south shore of Suzie Lake;
- 4.2 kilometres (2.6 mi) north across Suzie Lake (elevation: 432 metres (1,417 ft)) along its full length to its mouth;
- 3.0 kilometres (1.9 mi) north through Hazelwood Lake (elevation: 431 metres (1,414 ft)) on its full length;

Suzie River Intermediate Course (segment of 30.3 kilometres (18.8 mi))

- 4.5 kilometres (2.8 mi) north by winding up to a small lake formed by the widening of the river;
- 5.1 kilometres (3.2 mi) north through marsh areas to a creek (from the North);
- 2.8 kilometres (1.7 mi) westerly to the Chênevert River (coming from the South);
- 3.3 kilometres (2.1 mi) to the North by collecting the waters from the outlet of the Lac de l'Impôt to the dump (coming from the West) of Lake France;
- 2.6 kilometres (1.6 mi) north winding to the Canadian National Railway;
- 6.2 kilometres (3.9 mi) northward from the west side of Lorette Lake to the east shore of Lac Lacousière;
- 5.8 kilometres (3.6 mi) northward across Lac Lacoursière (length: 8.3 kilometres (5.2 mi); altitude: 418 metres (1,371 ft)) on its full length, up to at its mouth. Note: Lake Lacoursière has a marsh area on the east shore of the northern part. This lake receives the waters of Hudson Creek on its southeastern shore. And the Canadian National Railway runs south of the lake.

Lower Suzie River (segment of 27.0 kilometres (16.8 mi))

- 5.8 kilometres (3.6 mi) north winding to the south shore of Ganas Lake;
- 3.9 kilometres (2.4 mi) north across Ganas Lake (elevation: 412 metres (1,352 ft)) to its full length, to the rapids;
- 5.4 kilometres (3.4 mi) north to the South shore of the Lake Brécourt;
- 4.0 kilometres (2.5 mi) heading north across the lake Brécourt (altitude: 405 metres (1,329 ft)) to the dam at its mouth. Note: This dam deflects water from Lake Brécourt eastward through an auxiliary reel to Lake Poet. From there, the current goes to the Gouin Reservoir;
- 3.6 kilometres (2.2 mi) north to the south shore of Cedar Lake;
- 4.0 kilometres (2.5 mi) northeasterly across Cedar Lake on its full length;
- 0.3 kilometres (0.19 mi) easterly to the confluence of the river.

The Suzie River discharges on the west shore of Du Poète Lake (Mégiscane River) (elevation: 406 metres (1,332 ft)) which flows into a bend in the Mégiscane River. The latter is a tributary of Parent Lake (Abitibi). This latter lake flows into the Bell River, a tributary of Matagami Lake. The latter lake in turn flows into the Nottaway River, a tributary of the southeastern shore of James Bay.

This confluence of the Suzie River with Lake Bernier is located at 30.7 kilometres (19.1 mi) north of the Canadian National Railway, at 31.7 kilometres (19.7 mi) north of the Susie River Railway Station, at 93.7 kilometres (58.2 mi) north-west of the village center of Parent, at 11.6 kilometres (7.2 mi) at the West of Gouin Reservoir and at 104.3 kilometres (64.8 mi) east of Parent Lake (Abitibi).

== History ==
In 1948, the Government of Quebec approved the Shawinigan Water & Power Company project to raise the Gouin Reservoir, in order to increase the flow of the Saint-Maurice River and consequently increase the hydro-electric production. The Shawinigan Water & Power Company was able to carry out this project, by diverting the headwaters of the Mégiscane River and the Suzie River, which flowed naturally to the north, the James Bay, to make them flow south to the St. Lawrence River by the Saint-Maurice River. A series of dykes and canals have been built in these two rivers in order to carry out the diversion of the waters.

== Toponymy ==
According to the Commission de toponymie du Québec, a first document, the name "Susie River" was approved on July 16, 1935, by the Quebec Geography Commission and according to a second, the name "Suzie River" was approved December 30, 1963.

The toponym "Suzie River" was inscribed on December 5, 1968, at the "Bank of Place Names" of the Commission de toponymie du Québec, when it was created.

== See also ==
- Abitibi-Temiscamingue
- Gouin Reservoir
- Mégiscane River, a watercourse
- Saint-Maurice River, a watercourse
- Mauricie
- Nottaway River, a watercourse
- Matagami Lake, a body of water
- Bell River, a watercourse
- Parent Lake (Abitibi), a body of water
- Chênevert River, a watercourse
- Senneterre, a city
- List of rivers of Quebec
