= Plamondon Bay =

Bay in Quebec, Canada

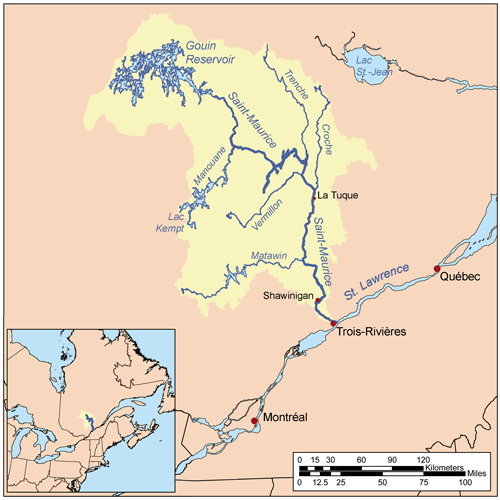
- Watershed of Saint-Maurice River

- Location within Quebec
- Location: La Tuque
- Coordinates: QC_source:CGNDB_scale:250000 48°34′30″N 75°15′32″W
- Type: Baie of dam
- Primary inflows: Plamondon Creek
- Primary outflows: Du Mâle Lake
- Basin countries: Canada
- Max. length: 13.2 kilometres (8.2 mi)
- Max. width: 5.2 kilometres (3.2 mi)
- Surface elevation: 402 metres (1,319 ft)

Plamondon Bay is a freshwater body situated in the western part of Gouin Reservoir, within the territory of the town of La Tuque, in the administrative region of Mauricie, Quebec, Canada.

This bay predominantly extends across the townships of Hanotaux (western part) and Crémazie.

The primary economic activity in the region revolves around recreational tourism, with forestry following as a secondary activity.

The hydrographic terrain of Plamondon Bay is accessible via the R1045 forest road originating from Obedjiwan village, Quebec, and passing along the northwest perimeter of Gouin Reservoir. It is also accessible through the R1009 forest road that skirts the western side of Plamondon Bay and Hanotaux Bay. These two roads intersect approximately 9.1 kilometres (5.7 mi) northwest of the mouth of Plamondon Creek. An auxiliary road, oriented in a north–south direction and branching into various forest pathways, provides access to the western side of Plamondon Bay and Plamondon Creek. Another road, also oriented north–south, runs along the eastern side.

Typically, the surface of Plamondon Bay freezes from mid-November until the end of April. However, secure ice circulation generally takes place from early December to the conclusion of March.

== Geography ==
The main hydrographic slopes near Plamondon Bay are:

- north side: Plamondon Creek, Berthelot River, Pascagama River, De la Rencontre Creek;
- east side: Gouin Reservoir, Du Mâle Lake, Bourgeois Lake (Gouin Reservoir), Toussaint Lake, Marmette Lake, Bureau Lake (Gouin Reservoir) (North Bay);
- south side: Hanotaux Bay, Adolphe-Poisson Bay, Mattawa Bay, Saraana Bay, Bignell Creek, Flapjack River;
- west side: Berthelot River, Pascagama River, Saint-Cyr Lake (Saint-Cyr River South), Cherrier Lake, Mégiscane River and Mercier Lake.

Plamondon Bay, which is a length of 13.2 kilometres (8.2 mi), looks like a witch's arm: the south-west part of the bay is the hand with long scratched fingers, the area of the exit of the bay constitutes the misshapen elbow and the northern part represents the upper part up to the witch's shoulder. This body of water is described as follows:

- the northern part of the bay stretches over 3.8 kilometres (2.4 mi) forming several secondary bays and collecting the waters of Plamondon Creek (coming from the North);
- the southwestern part includes a bay of 8.6 kilometres (5.3 mi) stretching as far as the canton of Hanotaux;
- the South-East part (attached to the bend of the bay) has an archipelago whose largest island has a length of 1.5 kilometres (0.93 mi), as well as numerous bays and peninsulas. This part of the bay stretches to the south-east to the exit of the bay which narrows through two straits of a width of about 200 meters each before reaching the west shore of the Du Mâle Lake (Gouin Reservoir).

Plamondon Bay is mainly fed by the Plamondon Creek which flows to the bottom of the northern part of Plamondon Bay at 1.8 kilometres (1.1 mi) south of the southern limit of the Lacasse township.

The mouth of Plamondon Bay is located in the Southeast at:

- 6.7 kilometres (4.2 mi) southeast of the mouth of Plamondon Creek;
- 4.1 kilometres (2.5 mi) west of the mouth of the Kaopatinak Pass which connects the southwestern part of the Du Mâle Lake (Gouin Reservoir) and the bays of the Southwest, to rest of Gouin Reservoir;
- 23.6 kilometres (14.7 mi) south-west of the village center of Obedjiwan, Quebec which is located on a peninsula on the north shore of Gouin Reservoir;
- 86.6 kilometres (53.8 mi) west of Gouin Dam;
- 130 kilometres (81 mi) northwest of the village center of Wemotaci, Quebec (north shore of the Saint-Maurice River);
- 221 kilometres (137 mi) north-west of downtown La Tuque;
- 318 kilometres (198 mi) northwest of the mouth of the Saint-Maurice River (confluence with the St. Lawrence River at Trois-Rivières).

From the mouth of Plamondon Bay, the current flows over 122.8 kilometres (76.3 mi) to Gouin Dam, according to the following segments:

- 28.4 kilometres (17.6 mi) northeasterly across the western part of Gouin Reservoir including the Du Mâle Lake to the south of Obedjiwan, Quebec;
- 81.9 kilometres (50.9 mi) to the east, crossing in particular Marmette Lake, then to the South-East crossing notably Brochu Lake, then towards across the Kikendatch Bay until Gouin Dam.

From this dam, the current flows along the Saint-Maurice River to Trois-Rivières where it flows onto the North Shore of the St. Lawrence River.

== Toponymy ==
The term "Plamondon" is a family name of French origin.

The toponym "Baie Plamondon" was formalized on December 5, 1968, by the Commission de toponymie du Québec, at the creation of this commission.

== See also ==
- Saint-Maurice River, a watercourse
- Gouin Reservoir, a body of water
- Du Mâle Lake, a body of water
- Plamondon Creek, a watercourse
- La Tuque, a city
- List of lakes in Canada
