= Napoleon Museum =

Napoleon Museum may refer to:

- The Louvre, named the Napoleon Museum between 1803 and 1814
- Maison Bonaparte (Ajaccio, Corsica)
- Palace of Fontainebleau § Museum of Napoleon I
- Napoleon Museum (Havana), Cuba
- Napoleon Museum (Monaco)
- Arenenberg, a castle in Switzerland that houses the Napoleonmuseum
