= Lapage =

Lapage is a surname. Notable people with the surname include:

- Joseph LaPage (1838–1878), Canadian serial killer
- Michael Lapage (1923–2018), English rower

== See also ==
- Lepage
