= Lepage =

Lepage or LePage or Le Page is a surname that may refer to:

- Alexanne Lepage (born 2005), Canadian swimmer
- Antoine-Simon Le Page du Pratz (1695?–1775), author of a memoir about early 18th century Louisiana
- Bradford William LePage (1876–1958), Canadian politician
- Corinne Lepage (born 1951), French politician
- Ebenezer Le Page, character in a novel by G. B. Edwards
- Frédéric Lepage, French television writer and producer
- G. Peter Lepage, (born 1952) Canadian American theoretical physicist
- Guy A. Lepage (born 1960), Canadian comedian and producer
- Henri Lepage (disambiguation)
- Henry Le Page (1792–1854), French gunsmith
- Jean le Page, known as John Pagus
- Jean Le Page (1779–1822), French gunsmith
- Jean Le Page, known as Yann ar Floc'h, (1881–1936), Breton folklorist
- Jean-François Lepage (born 1960), French photographer
- Jules Bastien-Lepage (1848–1884), French naturalist painter
- Kevin Lepage (born 1962), American NASCAR driver
- Marquise Lepage (born 1959), Canadian producer, screenwriter, and film and television director
- Octavio Lepage Barreto (1923–2017), Venezuelan politician
- Paul LePage (born 1948), former Republican governor of the U.S. State of Maine
- Pierce LePage, Canadian decathlete.
- Pierre Le Page (1746–1834), French gunsmith
- René Lepage de Sainte-Claire (1656–1718), founder of the town of Rimouski, in Québec, Canada
- Robert Lepage (born 1957), Canadian playwright, actor, and director, from Québec
- Sophia Lepage-Morgan Alias SLMorgan Alias Sofia Elle Morgane (born 1976), singer, painter, multidisciplinary artist and producer from the town of Montreal, in Québec, Canada
- Théophile Lepage (1901–1991), Belgian mathematician

== See also ==
=== Places ===
- Lepage River, Canada
- Lepage Lake, (Lac # 78036) Fishing Map | Nautical Charts near Lac Simon in Québec, Canada
- Saint-Joseph-de-Lepage, Quebec, a Canadian municipality

=== Companies ===
- Fauré Le Page, French firearms manufacturer
- Platt-LePage Aircraft Company, American aircraft company
- Royal LePage, Canadian real estate brokerage company
