= Napoleon Museum (Havana) =

Coordinates: 23.1360°N 82.3809°W

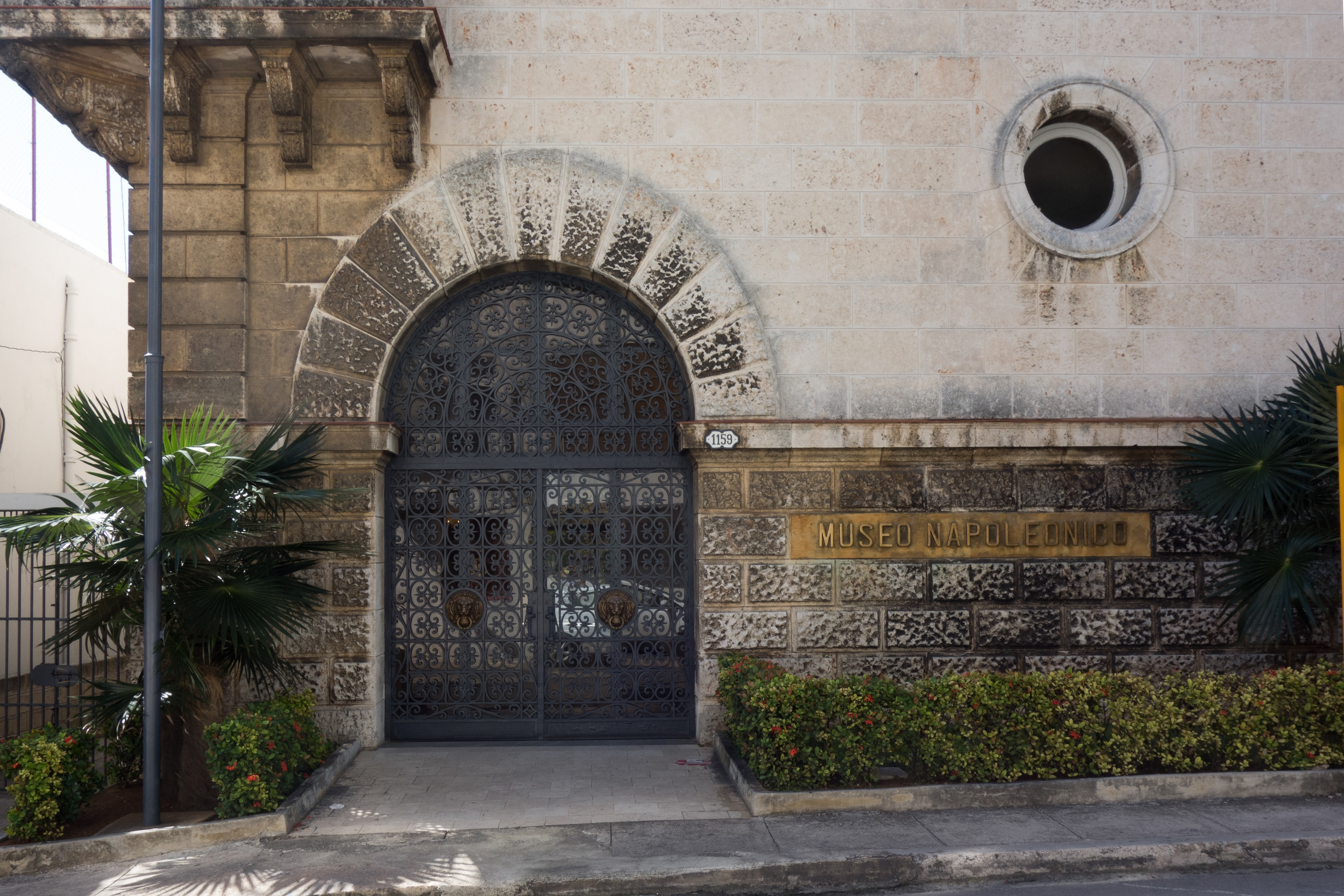
- Napoleon Museum, Havana, Cuba
- Established: 1961
- Location: San Miguel Street, Havana, Cuba
- Type: Historic museum

The Napoleon Museum in Havana, Cuba houses one of the most important collections from the 18th and 19th centuries preserved in the Western hemisphere. The museum is on San Miguel Street, between Ronda and Mazón, on one side of the University of Havana.

The museum was founded in 1961, with the collection of Julio Lobo, and some ítems own by Fulgencio Batista (an admirer of Napoleon) an from the collection of the businessman Óscar Cintas as well, occupying a 1929 Florentine Renaissance style mansion "La Dolce Dimora", the home of an Italian-Cuban politician, Orestes Ferrara. The architects were Evelio Govantes and Félix Cabarrocas, whose also designed El Capitolio and the Casa de la Amistad on Paseo. The museum reopened in March 2011 after a three-year restoration by the City Historian's Office. Napoleon Princess Alix de Foresta, widow of Luis Marie Bonaparte, a descendant of Bonaparte's younger brother Jérôme Bonaparte, was especially invited to the island for the reopening.

The museum displays almost 8,000 items, most of them related to the period from the French Revolution through the Second Empire. The collection includes a specialized library, suits, weapons, military equipment, furniture, coins, historic and decorative objects. Artwork is displayed from Louis Tocqué, Jean-Marc Nattier, Nicolas de Largillière, Jean Baptiste Regnault; François Flameng, Andrea Appiani, Edouard Detaille, Antoine Jean Gros, Marguerite Gérard and Robert Léfèvre. Also we can find sculptures by Antonio Canova and Lorenzo Bartolini, furnitures and decorative arts by artisans like Jean Philipe Gui Gentil Paroy, De Boubert, Le Page, Desprez, Pierre Philippe Thomire, Jacob D.R. Meslèe, Charles Percier, Pierre Francois Fontaine, Jean Baptiste Claude Odiot, François-Xavier Heckel, A. Thouret, etc. The museum displays Napoleon's death mask, brought by Dr. Francesco Antommarchi, the last doctor to treat Napoleon on Saint Helena, who died in Santiago de Cuba; and Napoleon's telescope.

The Collection of the Museo Napoleonico Havana, Cuba was published in 2021 by Luke Dalla Bona. It is the result of almost 10 years of research and investigations with authorization from the Office of the Historian of the City of Havana. This exhaustively researched book includes historical information about the origins of the collection, the museum, as well as details about the important Napoleonic artifacts in the inventory.
