= Rue de Richelieu =

Street in Paris, France

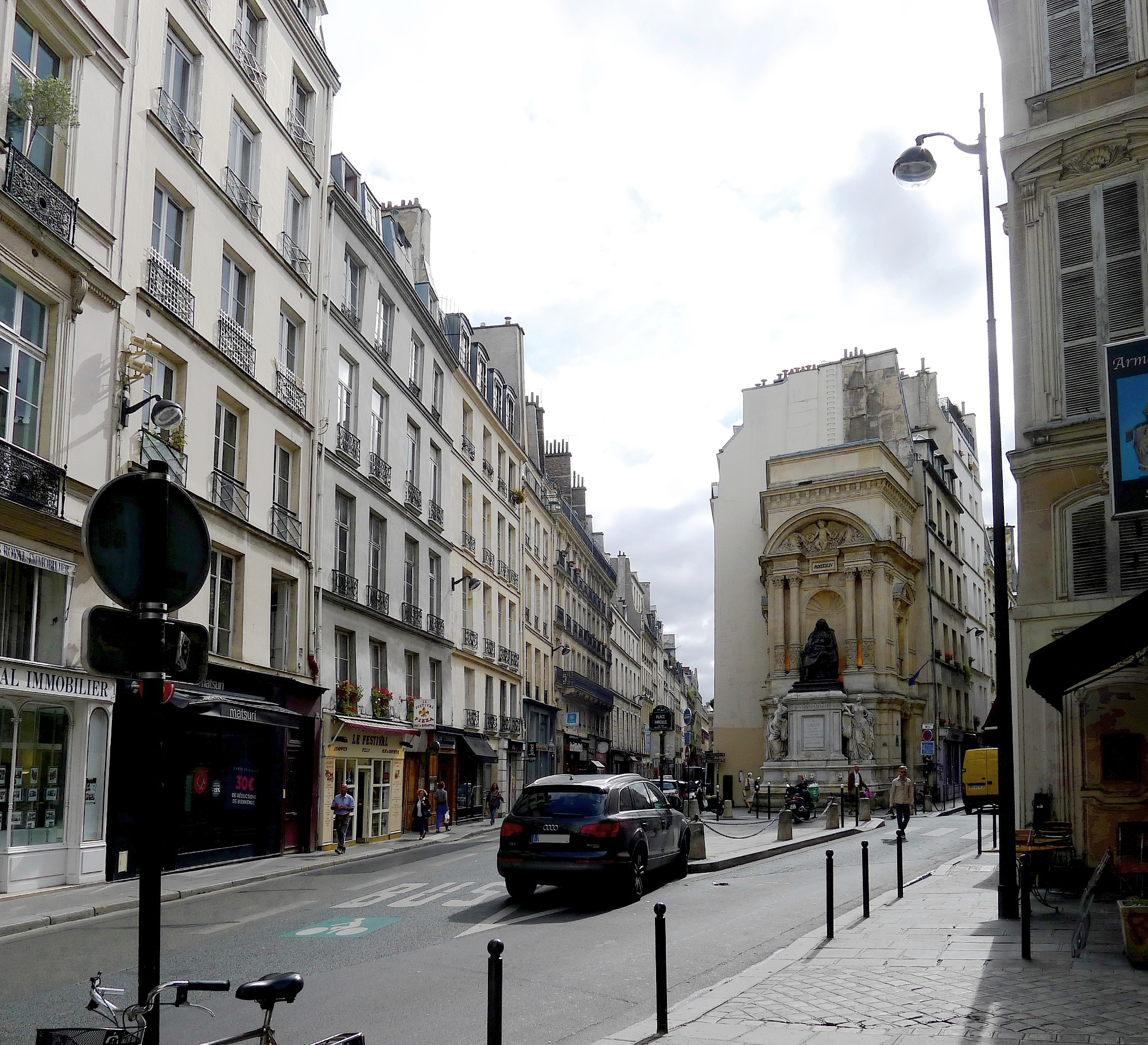
- Rue de Richelieu at the Place Mireille

- Location within Paris
- Namesake: Cardinal Richelieu
- Length: 990 m (3,250 ft)
- Width: 12 m (39 ft)
- Arrondissement: 1st, 2nd
- Quarter: Palais Royal Vivienne
- Coordinates: 48°52′05″N 2°20′18″E
- From: 2 Place André-Malraux
- To: 1 Boulevard des Italiens

Construction
- Completion: 23 November 1633 (from Place Colette to Rue Feydeau); 18 October 1704 beyond
- Denomination: 1634?, then 1806

The Rue de Richelieu (French pronunciation: [ʁy də ʁiʃ(ə)ljø]) is a long street of Paris, starting in the south of the 1st arrondissement at the Comédie-Française and ending in the north of the 2nd arrondissement. For the first half of the 19th century, before Georges-Eugène Haussmann redefined Paris with grand boulevards, it was one of the most fashionable streets of Paris.

It is notable for the National Library of France and for scattered coin dealers and currency changers, being near the Paris Bourse, the stock market.

== Name ==
The street is named for the Cardinal de Richelieu, chief minister of King Louis XIII from 1624 to 1642.

The street was originally called the Rue Royale and then Rue de Richelieu soon after. The name was changed to the Rue de la Loi in 1793 during the French Revolution; its name was restored to Richelieu in 1806.

== Notable buildings ==
- Palais-Royal, a Richelieu residence (Monument historique)
- Bibliothèque nationale de France, Site Richelieu, a historical building (Monument historique)
- Comédie-Française, main hall (Salle Richelieu)
- The old Fauré Le Page store located 8, Rue de Richelieu at the corner of the Rue de Richelieu and the Rue de Montpensier. The famous firearms played an active role to the French Revolution by distributing arms to the people in 1789 and in 1830.
- The former Royal Palace Hotel, which opened in 1909 was located in the same building as the Fauré Le Page store.
- The birth of the croissant itself—that is, its adaptation from the plainer form of kipferl, before the invention of viennoiseries—can be dated to at least 1839 (some say 1838) when an Austrian artillery officer, August Zang, founded a Viennese bakery ("Boulangerie Viennoise") at 92, Rue de Richelieu. This bakery, which served Viennese specialties including the kipferl and the Vienna loaf, quickly became popular and inspired French imitators (and the concept, if not the term, of viennoiserie, a 20th-century term for supposedly Vienna-style pastries). The French version of the kipferl was named for its crescent (croissant) shape and has become an identifiable shape across the world.
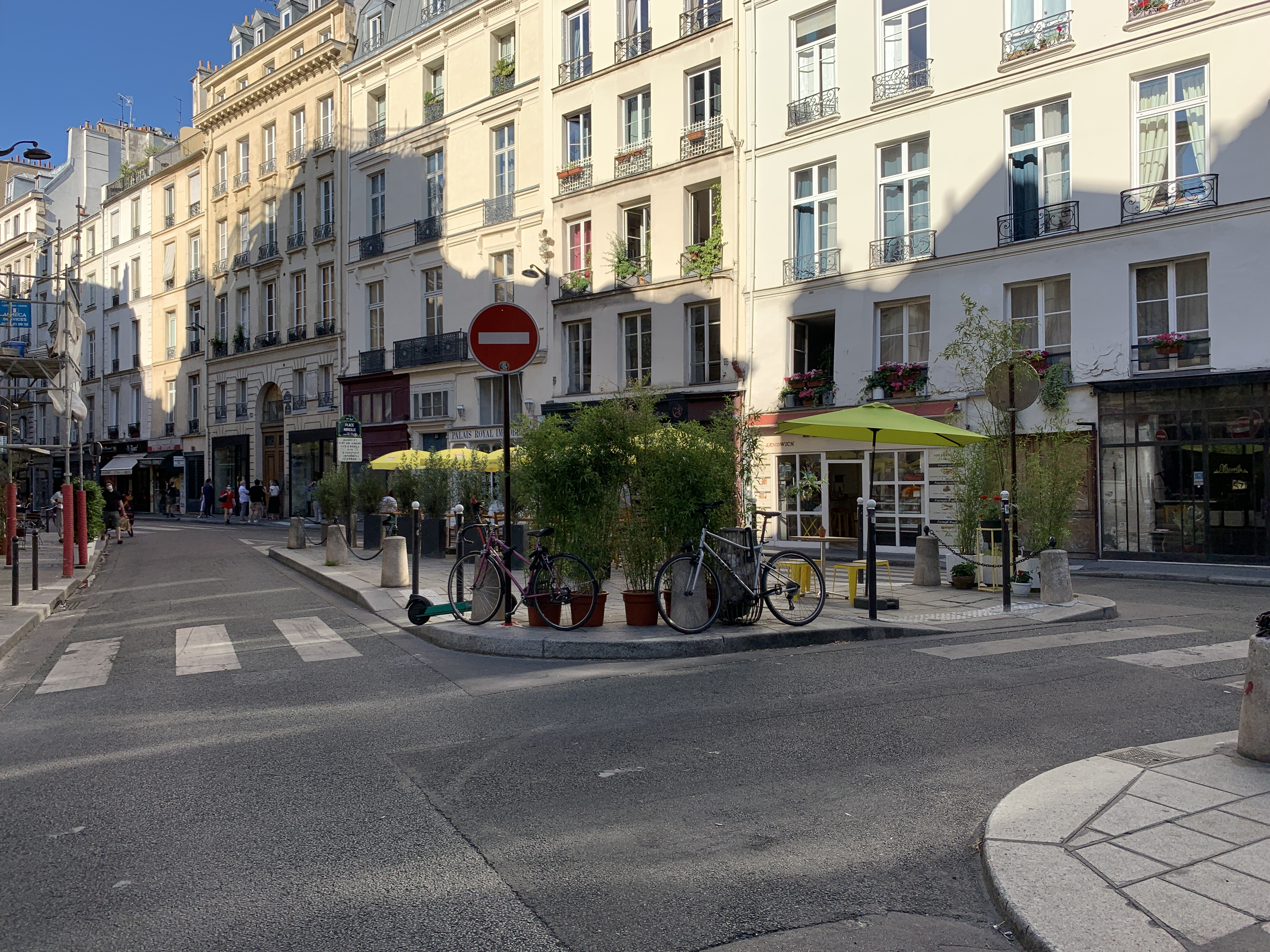
Rue de Richelieu at the Place Mireille

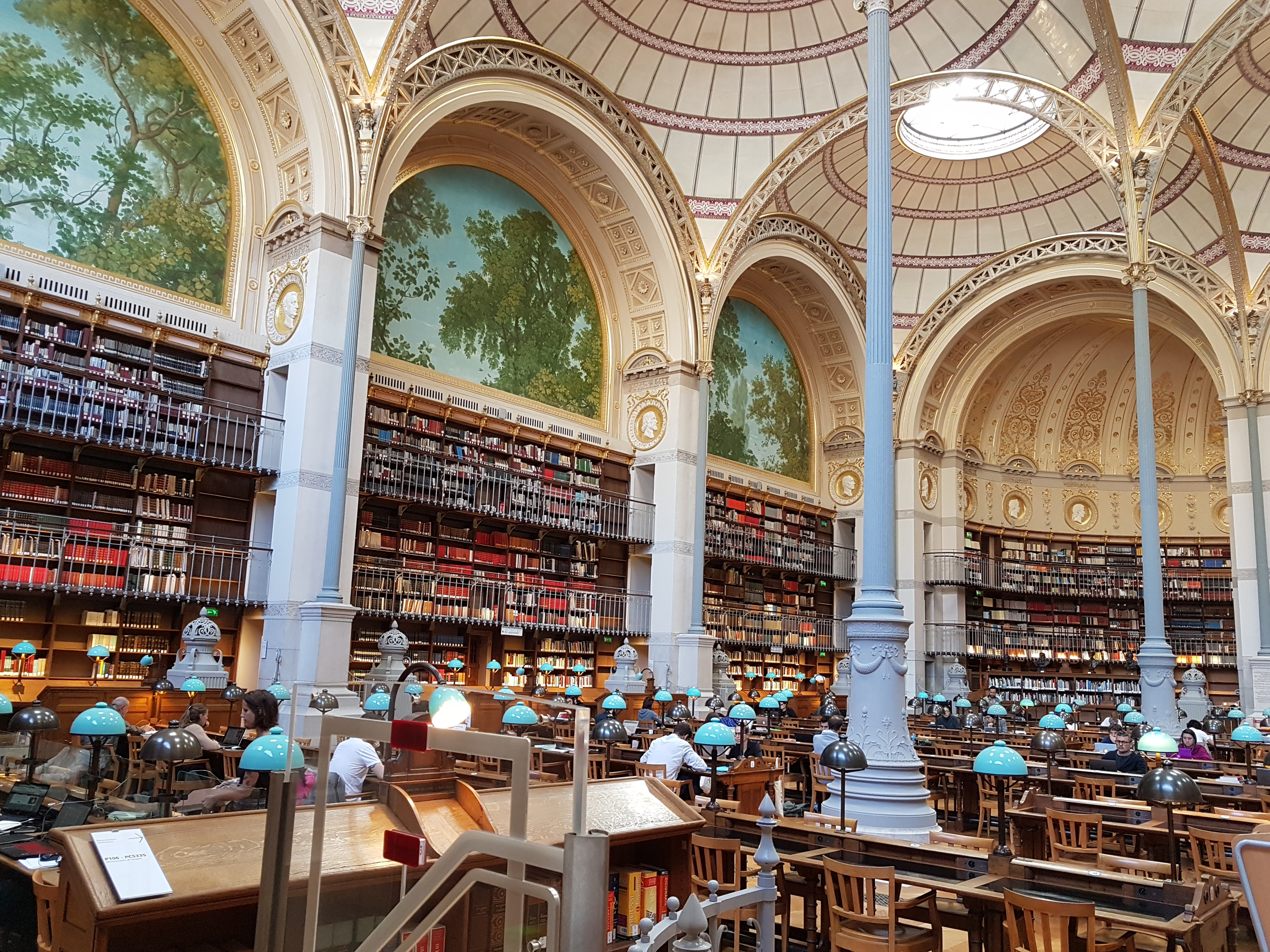
Salle Labrouste, Bibliothèque nationale de France, Site Richelieu

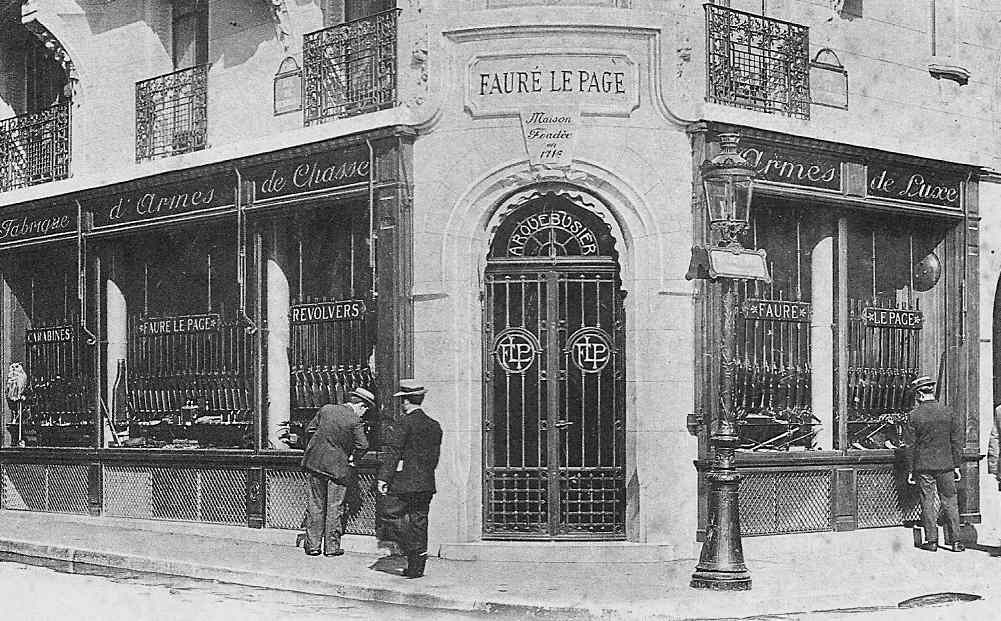
The old Fauré Le Page store is located at 8, Rue de Richelieu

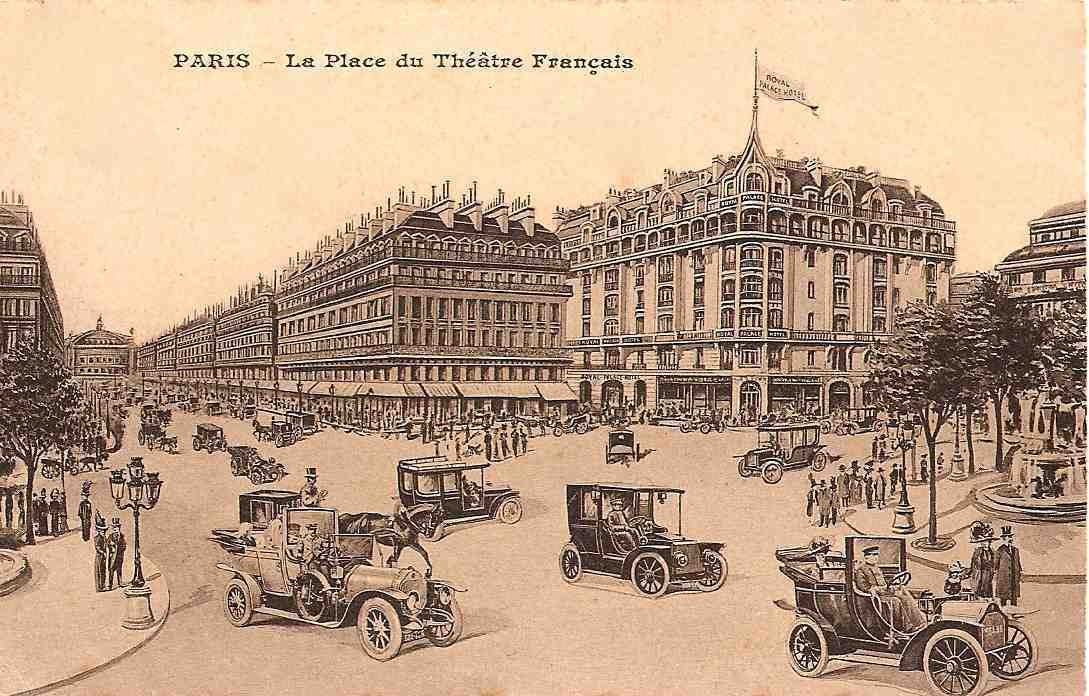
The Royal Palace Hotel, inaugurated in 1909

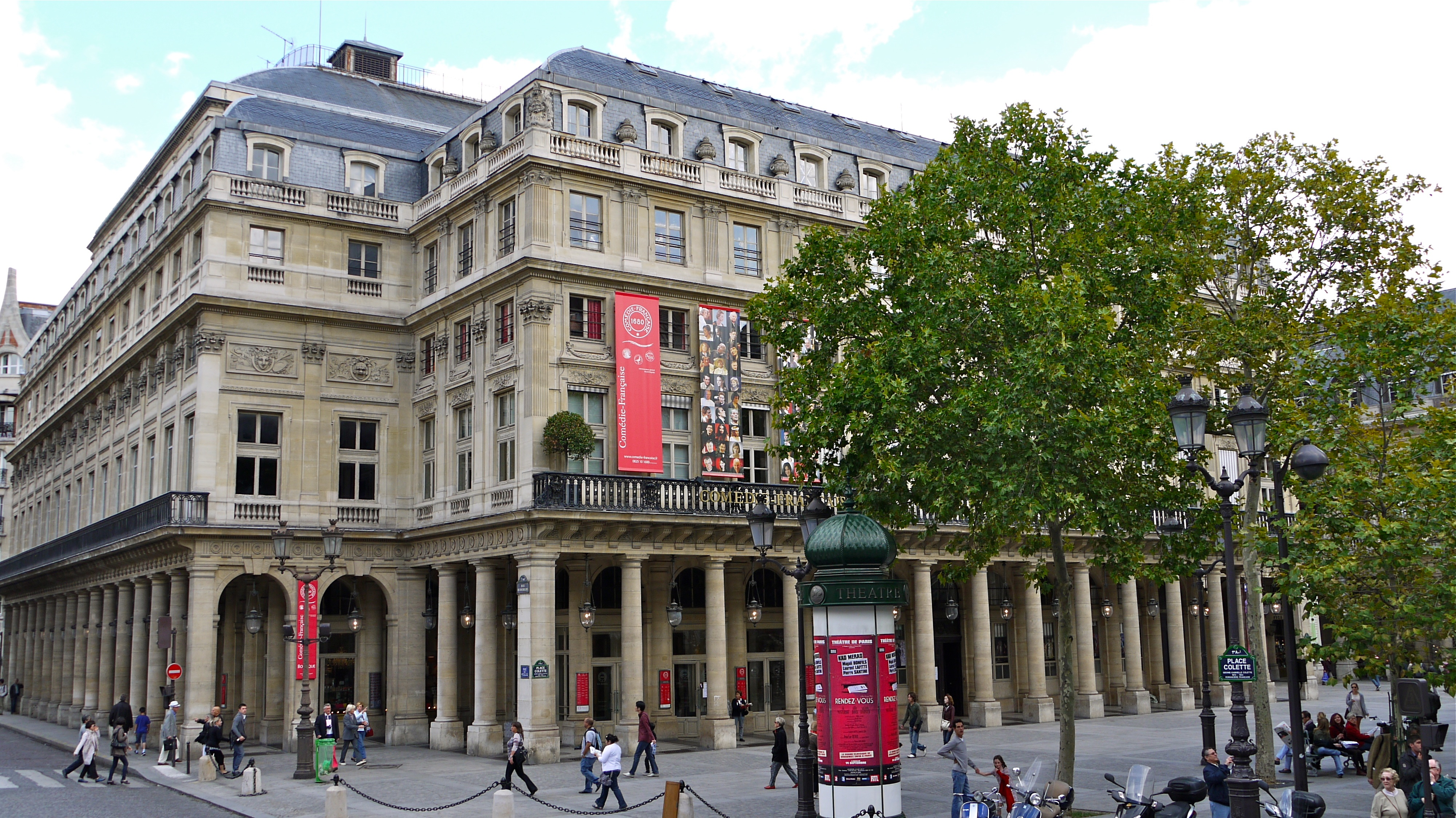
Comédie-Française

== Access ==
Located near the Metro stations: Richelieu–Drouot and Palais Royal–Musée du Louvre.

== See also ==
- Hôtel Tubeuf
