= Serpent River =

Tributary of the Mégiscane River in Quebec, Canada

Serpent
- Watershed of Nottaway River

Location
- Country: Canada
- Province: Quebec
- Region: Abitibi-Témiscamingue

Physical characteristics
- Source: Serpent Lake
  - location: Senneterre, La Vallée-de-l'Or Regional County Municipality (RCM), Abitibi-Témiscamingue, Quebec
  - coordinates: 48°16′56″N 76°04′12″W
  - elevation: 406 m (1,332 ft)
- Mouth: Mégiscane River, Noiseux Bay, Canusio Lake
  - location: Senneterre, La Vallée-de-l'Or Regional County Municipality, Abitibi-Témiscamingue, Quebec
  - coordinates: 49°29′19″N 75°50′45″W
  - elevation: 388 m (1,273 ft)
- Length: 41.4 km (25.7 mi)

The Serpent River is a tributary of the Mégiscane River, flowing into the townships of Trévet, Vasson and Noiseux, in the territory of Senneterre, in La Vallée-de-l'Or Regional County Municipality (RCM), in the administrative region of Abitibi-Témiscamingue, in Quebec, in Canada.

The Serpent River flows entirely in forest area, west of the Gouin Reservoir. Forestry is the main economic activity of this hydrographic slope; recreational tourism activities, second. The surface of the river is usually frozen from mid-December to mid-April.

The south side of the Snake River Head Zone is served by the Canadian National Railway and a forest road from the west along the North Railway and then along the shore. South of the upper part of the Serpent River.

== Geography ==
The Serpent River originates at the mouth of the body of water (total navigable length: 12.5 kilometres (7.8 mi); maximum width: 1.0 kilometre (0.62 mi); altitude: 406 metres (1,332 ft)) with two parts: the southern part (Serpent Lake) has a length of 3.3 kilometres (2.1 mi) and the northern part (Mitikoganik Lakes), 11.3 kilometres (7.0 mi). The two parts are contiguous.

The Mitikoganik lakes feed mainly on surrounding streams: Lake Bédard discharge (from the West), discharge (from the West) of a set of lakes in swampy area, discharge of a set of lakes (coming from Northeast) in mountain areas. The Serpent Lake feeds on the Strait connecting it to Mitikoganik Lakes and the southwest (Longpré and Racine Lakes) outlet.

Around this body of water, the highest mountain peak reaches 486 metres (1,594 ft) west of Mitikoganik lakes and 490 metres (1,610 ft) in the east. This body of water takes the shape of a snorkel whose blower looks to the east. Along the length, Mitikoganik lakes have many islands and peninsulas in its southern part.

This head of water is located at:

- Northwesterly of the watershed with the hydrographic subsurface of the headwaters of the Trévet River flowing northeasterly to discharge on the west bank of the Kekek River flowing north to the Mégiscane River;
- East of the watershed with the hydrographic subsurface of the Attic head zone, which generally flows southwestward to spill onto the eastern shore of the Mégiscane River.

The mouth of the Serpent Lake is located on the boundary of Valmy and Trévet Townships, which is 3.4 kilometres (2.1 mi) north of the Canadian National Railway (or 4.8 kilometres (3.0 mi) from Gagnon-Siding Railway Station), at 88.4 kilometres (54.9 mi) east of downtown Senneterre, at 114.5 kilometres (71.1 mi) west of the village center of Parent and 28.5 kilometres (17.7 mi) north-east of the confluence of the Serpent River with the Mégiscane River.

The main hydrographic slopes near the Serpent River are:

- North side: Mégiscane Lake, Canusio Lake, Mégiscane River;
- East side: Mégiscane River, Kekek River;
- South side: Trévet River, Kekek River;
- West side: Attic River, Berthelot River, Whitegoose River, Mégiscane River.

From the mouth of Snake Lake, the Serpent River flows on 41.4 kilometres (25.7 mi) according to the following segments:

- 6.5 kilometres (4.0 mi) north-east, crossing Raven Lake (length: 0.9 kilometres (0.56 mi); altitude: 399 metres (1,309 ft)) and continuing to discharge (from the north) of a set of lakes;
- 24.4 kilometres (15.2 mi) (or 15.1 kilometres (9.4 mi) in a direct line) north-east winding, to the discharge (coming from the north-east) of a set of lakes;
- 7.3 kilometres (4.5 mi) to the north, snaking greatly in the marsh zone, up to a bend in the river;
- 3.2 kilometres (2.0 mi) northwesterly, then making a southwestward hook to the confluence of the river.

The Serpent River discharges on the southeastern shore of the Noisy Bay of Canusio Lake, which is crossed to the west by the Mégiscane River, which flows generally towards the west forming large zigzags, until the east shore of Parent Lake (Abitibi). This last lake is crossed to the north by the Louvicourt River, whose current will flow on the south shore of Tiblemont Lake.

This confluence of the Serpent River with the Mégiscane River is located at 95.6 kilometres (59.4 mi) north-east of the confluence of the Mégiscane River at 10.7 kilometres (6.6 mi) north of the confluence of the Kekek River, 104.1 kilometres (64.7 mi) northeast of downtown Senneterre and 30.5 kilometres (19.0 mi) north of the former Roll-Siding Railway Station of the Canadian National Railway.

== Toponymy ==
The term "Serpent" refers to the narrowness of the lake, especially the northern part.

The toponym "Serpent River" was formalized on December 5, 1968, at the Commission de toponymie du Québec, e.g. at its creation.

== See also ==
- Nottaway River, a watercourse
- Matagami Lake, a body of water
- Bell River, a watercourse
- Parent Lake (Abitibi), a body of water
- Mégiscane River, a watercourse
- Senneterre, a city
- La Vallée-de-l'Or Regional County Municipality (RCM)
- List of rivers of Quebec
