= Henri Lepage =

Henri Lepage may refer to:

- Henri Lepage (director) (1898–1970), French film director
- Henri Lepage (essayist) (born 1941), French economist
- Henri Lepage (fencer) (1908–1996), French Olympic fencer
