= Pascagama Lake =

Lake in Quebec, Canada

- Watershed of Nottaway River

- Location within Quebec
- Location: Eeyou Istchee James Bay (municipality)
- Coordinates: 48°32′43″N 75°36′48″W
- Type: Natural
- Primary inflows: Pascagama River
- Primary outflows: Pascagama River.
- Basin countries: Canada
- Max. length: 22.4 kilometres (13.9 mi)
- Max. width: 2.7 kilometres (1.7 mi)
- Surface elevation: 388 metres (1,273 ft)

Pascagama Lake is a freshwater body of the eastern part of Senneterre in La Vallée-de-l'Or Regional County Municipality (RCM), in the administrative region of Abitibi-Témiscamingue, in the province of Quebec, in Canada. This body of water extends in the townships of Deschamps, Logan and Bernier.

Forestry is the main economic activity of the sector. The recreational tourism activities come second, thanks to a navigable body of water of a length of , starting from the foot of the Pascagama River dam, including the Mégiscane River, Bernier Lake, Kekek River, Ouiscatis Lake and Canusio Lake.

The hydrographic slope of lake Pascagama is accessible through some forest roads serving several peninsulas. The surface of the river is usually frozen from early November to the end of April, however, safe ice circulation is generally from early December to mid-April.

== Geography ==
The shape of Lake Pascagama resembles a large V whose East Branch is constituted by an enlargement of the Mégiscane River (arriving from the Northeast); while the West Branch is formed by the continuity of the discharge of the Pascagama River (arriving from the North). The Chartrand River empties onto the west shore of a bay in the northern part of the lake.

This lake has a length of 22.4 kilometres (13.9 mi) a maximum width of 2.7 kilometres (1.7 mi) and an altitude of 390 metres (1,280 ft).

Pascagama Lake has many bays, including André Bay (south of the lake), peninsulas and islands, including Renard Island in the northern part of the lake.

Located south of the lake, the mouth of this lake Pascagama flows into the Mégiscane River. The area of the mouth has an archipelago of islands. This mouth is located at:

- 19.5 kilometres (12.1 mi) west of Gouin Reservoir;
- 15.7 kilometres (9.8 mi) East of Mégiscane Lake;
- 106.8 kilometres (66.4 mi) north-east of the mouth of the Mégiscane River;
- 115.3 kilometres (71.6 mi) north-east of the village center of Senneterre;
- 59.7 kilometres (37.1 mi) south-west of Obedjiwan Indian Reserve.

The main hydrographic slopes near Pascagama Lake are:

- North side: Pascagama River, Chartrand River, Aigle River (Doda Lake);
- East side: Suzie River, Bernier Lake, Mégiscane River;
- South side: Mégiscane River, Cedar Lake, Suzie River, Jack Lake;
- West side: Mégiscane River, Dumont Lake, Ouiscatis Lake.

== Toponymy ==
The term "Pascagama" is of Algonquin origin and refers to a camp, dam, lake and river.

The name "Lac Pascagama" was officialized on December 5, 1968 by the Commission de toponymie du Québec when it was created.

== See also ==
- Nottaway River, a watercourse
- Matagami Lake, a body of water
- Bell River, a watercourse
- Parent Lake (Abitibi), a body of water
- Mégiscane River, a watercourse
- Chartrand River, a watercourse
- Pascagama River, a watercourse
- Senneterre, a city
- La Vallée-de-l'Or Regional County Municipality (RCM)
- List of lakes in Canada
