= Fauré Le Page =

French firearms manufacturer

Fauré Le Page (French pronunciation: [fɔʁe l(ə) paʒ]) is a French firearms manufacturer (arquebusier and fourbisseur) founded in Paris in 1716 by Louis Pigny. The company remained within the Pigny family until 1913. Over the course of its history, the manufacturer was known as Pigny, Le Page, and Le Page Moutier before adopting the name Fauré Le Page in 1865. In addition to its production of holsters and gun bags, the company has since expanded its range to include organizers and handbags.

== History ==
=== Louis Pigny ===
The firearms manufacturer Louis Pigny opened shop in 1717 at Rue Baillif (today Rue des Bons-Enfants) in the 1st arrondissement of Paris. He received two royal warrants from King Louis XV in 1735 and 1756. He passed on his business to Pierre Le Page (or Lepage), who married his niece.

=== Pierre Le Page (1709–83) ===
Le Page's time (1743–79) secured the House of Orléans as one of the company's distinguished clients. He was born in Normandy, and he arrived in Paris in 1723. He started training the following year with the master gunsmith, Mazillier. He started working for Louis Pigny the same year.

After Pigny died in 1743, Le Page, who was already the master of firearms artillery and explosives at Pigny, inherited the firearms business. He also changed the firearms manufacturer's name from Pigny to Le Page (or Lepage). The company then moved to number 13, Rue de Richelieu, in 1759.

Pierre Le Page became the first firearms supplier of the Maréchal Maurice de Saxe, and then the House of Orléans. He left the company to his nephew, Jean Le Page.

=== Jean Le Page (1746–1834) ===
Jean Le Page's time (1779–1822) saw further expansion of the firearms manufacturing business Le Page. Aside from the House of Orleans, the company also included King Louis XVI, Napoleon Bonaparte, and King Louis XVIII as its clients. He was also born in Normandy like his uncle. He came to Paris with the initial goal of becoming a chemist. He ended up starting his training at Pierre Le Page in 1764. His training lasted four years. By 1779, he succeeded his uncle, who gave him his letter of mastery in 1780.

Jean Le Page led the family business during the First French Empire, furthering the brand's reputation through innovation and craftsmanship. The factory became renowned for its production of pistols, firearms, luxury melee weapons, and the iconic Le Page swords, rivaling the celebrated arms manufactured by Nicolas-Noël Boutet in Versailles. The brand made technical innovations during this time and obtained numerous warrants and patents, such as the warrant for a "mise à feu platinum" using over-oxygenated powder in 1810, a warrant for the invention of a water-resistant gun in 1817, and a warrant for silex platinum "pouvant être mise à feu à volonté à Poudre fulminant" in 1821. In 1809, Le Page introduced "une Platine à percussion to the market thus encouraging the National Industry in front of which, he gave a highly successful demonstration by shooting three hundred times without missing once".

As a supplier of arms to kings, his clientele grew to include names such as Armand Augustin Louis de Caulaincourt, Duke of Vincence, Baron Gaspard Gourgaud, Marshall Emmanuel de Grouchy, General Charles de Flahaut, Marchioness Catherine-Dominique de Pérignon, Marshall André Masséna, Duke of Rivoli, Baron Daru, General Carlo Andrea Pozzo di Borgo, and perfumer Jean-Francois Houbigant.

During this period, a shooting gun for Louis Philippe II, Duke of Orléans (future Philippe Égalité) was presented to the Museum of the Porte de Hal in Brussels, and First Consul Bonaparte's sword was exhibited at the Château de Malmaison. The Musée de la Chasse et de la Nature in Paris also has several Le Page pieces, including two of Emperor Napoleon I's shooting guns belonging to a series made in 1775 for King Louis XVI and modified around 1806; a silex gun that had belonged to King Louis XVIII and a nécessaire box containing a pair of silex guns for children, a gift from King Charles X to the Duke of Bordeaux, future Count of Chambord.

Le Page's store was situated at number 13, Rue de Richelieu (which became number 950 Rue de la Loi during the period of the Revolution), near the Palais Royal which strategically placed it in the midst of the action in 1789 and 1830. It appears that the family played an active role in preparing for the Storming of the Bastille and in the Trois Glorieuses by distributing firearms to the people.

Four out of his six children pursued a career in armoury. The eldest daughter, Justine, married Louis Perrin, arquebusier in Poitiers from 1813 to 1830 than in Paris, with bronze medals at the French Industrial Exposition of 1834, the Exposition of 1839 and the Exposition of 1844. He used Perrin Le Page as his signature.

André Jean Thomas, the second child, became an arquebusier and settled down elsewhere at number 24 Rue de la Monnaie around 1823. He used Le Page Fils as his signature.

Jean André Prosper Henri Le Page, the fourth child, succeeded his father in 1822. Eléonore Méliade married the officer Louis Didier Fauré.

=== Jean André Prosper Henri Le Page (1792 – Vichy 1854) ===
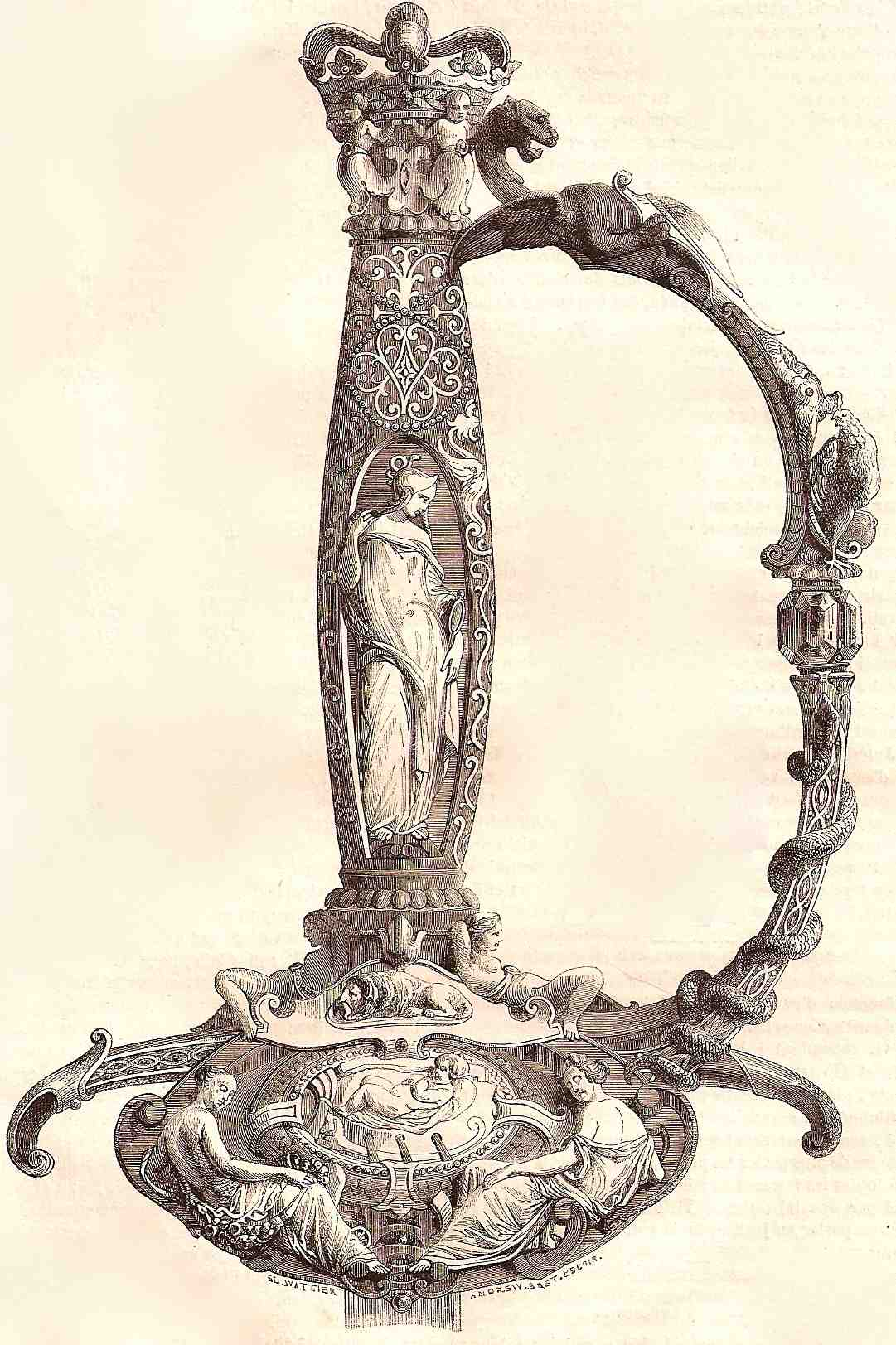
Hilt of the épée of the Comte of Paris, produced by Le Page, presented 2 May 1841.

Arquebusier and fourbisseur in Paris (1822–42) of King Louis XVIII, King Charles X and King Louis Philippe, and of the House of Orleans.

He succeeded his father in 1822 and in 1835 was nominated Arquebusier Ordinaire of the King, of the Duke of Orleans, and the Duke of Nemours. He owned a gunnery on the Champs-Élysées, Rue des Gourdes which became Rue Marbeuf.

While he was director, the international reputation of Le Page increased. He participated in the Paris Exhibitions of 1823, 1827, 1834, and received a silver medal at the 1839 Exhibition. The shop remained at number 13 rue de Richelieu.

The majority of the wares included guns and revolvers, but there was also a percussion gun with a snap clasp whose barrel would swivel to the side when one loaded its breechblock. When this gun was introduced in 1838 to a French military commission, the government had six hundred of them manufactured in the royal factory of Saint-Étienne to be used by the Lancers Regiment.

Jean Le Page participated as an official expert in the trial of Giuseppe Fieschi and the trial of the landing of Louis-Napoléon Bonaparte in Boulogne.

In 1842, he relinquished the direction of his company to his son-in-law.

He was the author of a text that establishes the genealogy of the Le Page family, which is kept in the National Archives of the French National Library in the Fonds Bro de Comères

=== Gilles Michel Louis Moutier-Le Page (Bayeux 1810 – Montfermeil 1887) ===
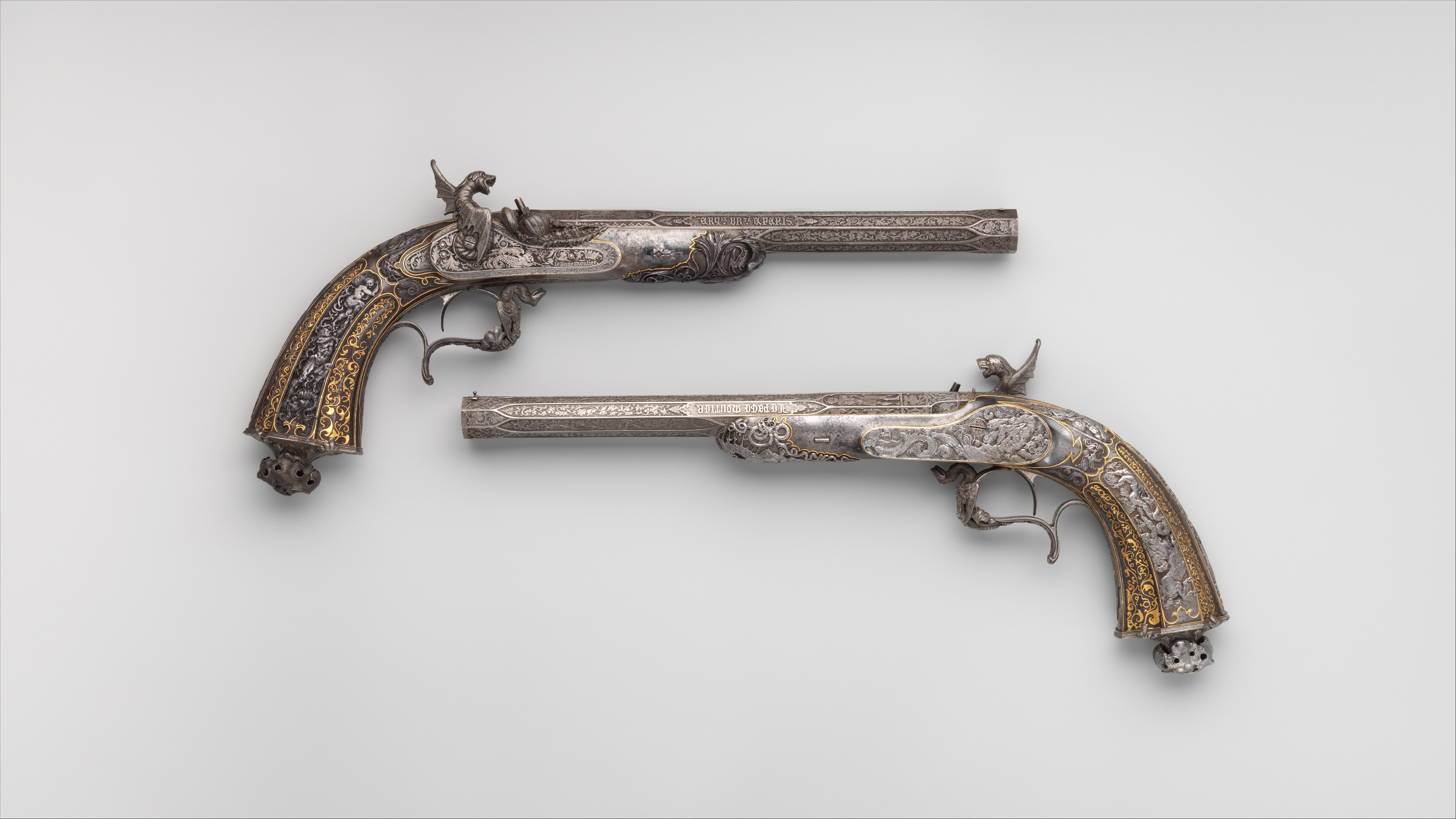
Two percussion exhibition pistols signed by Gilles Michel Louis Moutier-Le Page, dated 1849 and 1851

Arquebusier and fourbisseur in Paris (1842–1865). Gilles Michel Louis Moutier married Louis Didier Fauré's daughter. He succeeded Henri Le Page's in 1842 and used Le Page-Moutier as his signature.

He earned the silver medal at the Paris Expositions of 1844 and 1849 and 1st Class medal at the 1855 Expo. He took part in the London Expositions in 1851 where he received another medal– and in 1862. In 1865, he was joined in the business by Henri Le Page's nephew, Emile Henry Fauré.

=== Emile Henry Fauré Le Page (Paris 1840 – Paris 1929) ===
Arquebusier and fourbisseur in Paris (1865–1913), Warranted supplier to the Russian Imperial Court.

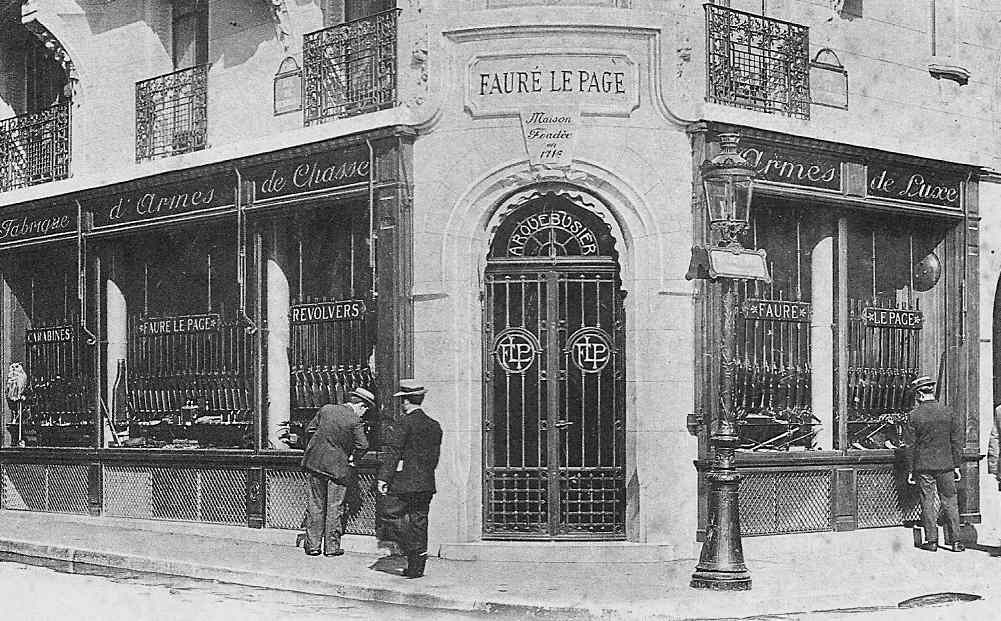
The old Fauré Le Page store is located at 8, rue de Richelieu in Paris

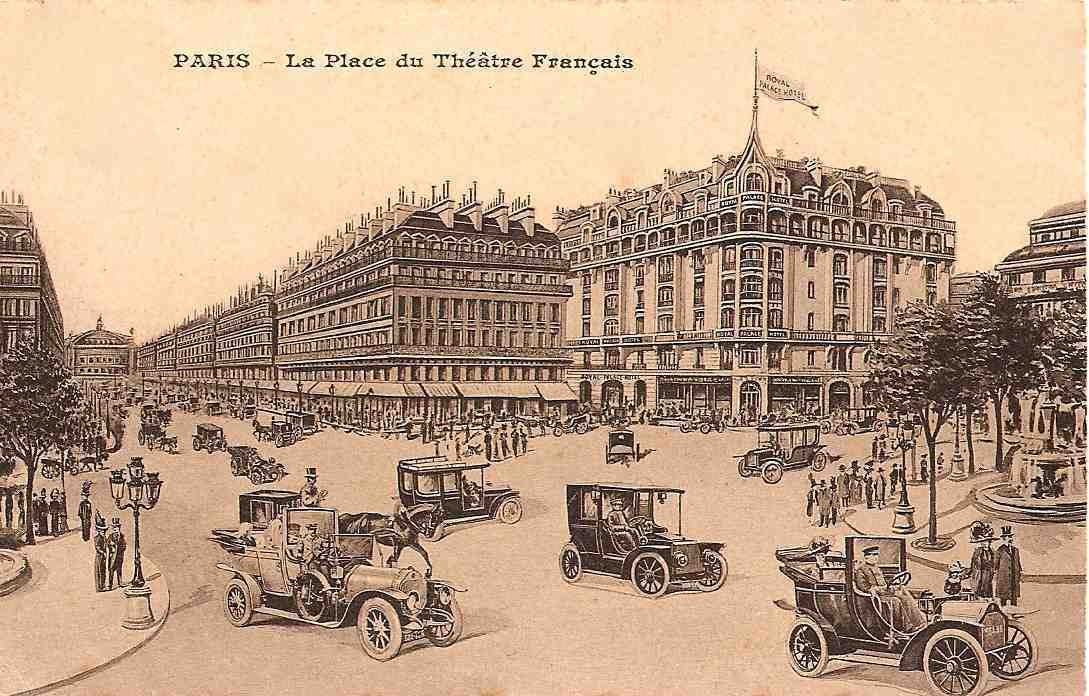
View of the Royal Palace Hôtel -inaugurated in 1909 -from the place du Théâtre Français

Emile was Henri Le Page's nephew, and Louis Didier Fauré and d'Eléonore Méliade's son. He became partners with Gilles Louis Michel Moutier in 1865 and became the sole owner in 1868.

He developed his international clientele and became the warranted supplier to the Russian Imperial Court. Taking part in each of the Universal Expositions, he accumulated honors in Paris in 1865 (First Class Medal), in 1867 (Silver Medal), in 1878 (Gold Medal), in 1889 (Grand Prix), and in Vienna in 1873 (Medal of Progress)

He was ordained Chevalier de la Légion d'Honneur in 1878 and then Officer of the Légion d'Honneur in 1894.

The store opened at number 8, rue de Richelieu (at the corner with the rue de Montpensier, which gives onto the Place du Théâtre Français), at the foot of the Royal Palace Hotel, which opened its doors in 1909.

In 1913, the armourer Dumond took over Fauré Le Page but kept the brand name and formed a company in 1925.

Emile Henry Fauré Le Page died in 1929 and was buried at the Père Lachaise Cemetery.

== Revolutionary commitments ==
The Le Page family became each administration's official supplier. The store's location, near the Palais-Royal placed the arquebusier at the heart of the political events during the eighteenth and nineteenth centuries, with the quantity of firearms kept in their warehouses being a target for the participants of the uprisings. It appears though that the Le Page family accompanied the revolutionary movement and from the beginning placed itself on the side of the protesters in 1789 and 1830.

Many texts bear testimony to their patriotic commitment:

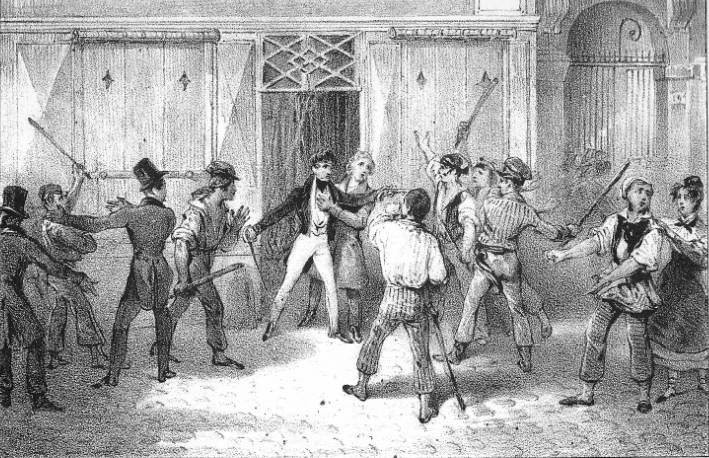
"L'Arquebusier Le Page refusing to give arms which he later distributes himself" lithography by Coeuré, 1830

"-M. Lepage, arquebusier, on Tuesday 27 July, deemed it his duty to oppose himself to the pillaging of the antique and precious firearms in his shops; he wanted to undertake himself, along with his employees, regular distribution of anything of use for the personal defense of his compatriots. During these three days, Mr. Le Page incessantly distributed firearms and munitions to everybody; on the morning of the 27th, he provided a hundred and twenty pounds of gunpowder. Since Tuesday, there has been a continuous flow of people in his shop; firearms were distributed at all hours, his eighty-five-year-old father helped him throughout. Patriotism is clearly hereditary in the Le Page family. During the first revolution, Mr. Le Page, arquebusier, gave up his stores three times to the defenders of freedom; today Mr. Le Page his son, has kept only his national gun and at the moment, along with all his triumphant fellow-citizens, he is under arms in his municipality."

During the fighting on rue Saint-Honoré, eyewitnesses recounted:

"While the Swiss Guard lying in ambush in the houses of rue Saint-Honoré was organizing the rue de Richelieu, one could see the ladies from Lepage go out into the street to distribute lead and other metals to the brave citizens who were fighting uncovered amidst the bullets."

"There are, however, two facts one must take note of because they are clues about popular sentiment. We know that on the 27th and 28th, all the signs of the patented arms dealers were either vandalized or broken. The gunsmith Le Page's sign, rue de Richelieu, read: Arquebusier of His Royal Highness Monseigneur the Duke of Orleans. The people had crossed out in black His Royal Highness and had neatly respected the name of the Duke of Orleans".

== Bibliography ==
- Le "Qui est qui" de l'arme en France de 1350 à 1970 tome 1 de Jean-Jacques Buigné - Éditions du Portail. 2001. ISBN 2-86551-044-1.
- Grands noms de l'armurerie de Yves Louis Cadiou - Éditions du Portail - Le Hussard. 1999. ISBN 2-86551-043-3.
- L'arme de chasse » de Olivier Achard & Christian Tavard - Editions Proxima. 2000 ISBN 2-84550-009-2.
- Histoire des Armes à feu du XV au XX siècle » de Merrill Lyndsay - Walker & Co. NY. 1972.
- Le Cabinet de Diane au Musée de la Chasse et de la Nature de Claude d'Anthenaise - Citadelles & Mazenod. 2007. ISBN 978-2-85088-253-1.
- Evénemens de Paris des 26,27,28 et 29 juillet 1830 et jours suivans par plusieurs témoins occulaires Casimir Delavigne - Chez J.P. Voglet Imprimeur-Libraire à Bruxelles. 1830.
- Relation historique des journées mémorables des 27,28, 29 juillet 1830 en l'honneur des Parisiens - H. Langlois Fils Éditeur- Paris. 1830.
- Histoire du règne de Louis-Philippe Ier. Tome 1 Victor de Nouvion - ChezDidier & Cie-Libraires Éditeurs à Paris. 1858.
