= Plamondon Creek =

Location
- Country: Canada
- Province: Quebec
- Region: Mauricie

Physical characteristics
- Source: Unidentified Lake
  - location: La Tuque (Lacasse Township), Mauricie, Quebec
  - coordinates: 48°44′25″N 75°12′50″W
  - elevation: 489 m (1,604 ft)
- Mouth: Plamondon Bay (Gouin Reservoir)
  - location: La Tuque (Crémazie Township), Mauricie, Quebec
  - coordinates: 48°36′40″N 75°15′57″W
  - elevation: 402 m (1,319 ft)
- Length: 16.2 km (10.1 mi)

Basin features
- Tributaries
  - right: (upstream); Outlet of lake Kamitcickotek; Outlet of lake Irinikew Octikwan.

The Plamondon Creek is a tributary of the Plamondon Bay (Gouin Reservoir) located in the western part of the Gouin Reservoir. This stream runs entirely in forest zone in the town of La Tuque, in the administrative region of Mauricie, in Quebec, in Canada.

The Plamondon stream flows successively in the townships of Lacasse and Crémazie. Forestry is the main economic activity of this valley; recreational tourism activities, second.

Secondary forest roads serve both sides of the Plamondon Creek valley. Forest Road R1045 serves the upper and western portions of the Plamondon Creek valley. The R1045 road joins the R2046 road eastwards, which in turn links east to the 202 forest road which runs south to serve the peninsula where the village of Obedjiwan, Quebec is located.

The surface of Plamondon Creek is usually frozen from mid-November to the end of April, however, safe ice circulation is generally from early December to late March.

== Geography ==
The surrounding hydrographic slopes of Plamondon Creek are:

- north side: Berthelot Creek, Lac de la Rencontre, Pascagama River;
- east side: Piponisiw River, De la Rencontre Creek, Simard Lake (Gouin Reservoir), Gouin Reservoir, Du Mâle Lake, Marmette Lake, Toussaint Lake;
- south side: Plamondon Bay (Gouin Reservoir), Hanotaux Bay, Mattawa Bay, Saraana Bay;
- west side: Tamarac River, Provancher Creek, Mégiscane River.

Plamondon Creek originates at the mouth of an unidentified lake (length: 0.2 kilometres (0.12 mi) altitude: 489 metres (1,604 ft)) surrounded by mountains. The mouth of this head lake is located at:

- 12.4 kilometres (7.7 mi) west of the course of the Pascagama River;
- 7.1 kilometres (4.4 mi) north of the mouth of Plamondon Creek (confluence with Plamondon Bay (Gouin Reservoir);
- 20.8 kilometres (12.9 mi) north-west of the mouth of the Plamondon Bay (Gouin Reservoir);
- 22.0 kilometres (13.7 mi) west of the village center of Obedjiwan, Quebec (located on a peninsula on the north shore of Gouin Reservoir);
- 92.9 kilometres (57.7 mi) west of the Gouin Dam erected at the mouth of the Gouin Reservoir (confluence with the Saint-Maurice River).

From the mouth of the head lake, the course of Plamondon Creek flows entirely in forest zone on 16.2 kilometres (10.1 mi) according to the following segments:

- 0.5 kilometres (0.31 mi) to the southeast, including crossing an unidentified lake (length: 0.3 kilometres (0.19 mi); altitude: 484 metres (1,588 ft)), up to at its mouth;
- 4.7 kilometres (2.9 mi) southwesterly to the outlet (from the west) of Irinikew Octikwan Lake (elevation: 419 kilometres (260 mi));
- 2.9 kilometres (1.8 mi) southwesterly to the north shore of an unidentified lake;
- 8.1 kilometres (5.0 mi) southerly in the township of Lacasse, then Crémazie, first crossing an unidentified lake (length: 7.1 kilometres (4.4 mi); altitude: 402 metres (1,319 ft)) which is connected on the west side to Kamitcickotek Lake, to the mouth of the river.

The mouth of Plamondon Creek is located at:

- 23.3 kilometres (14.5 mi) south-west of the village center of Obedjiwan, Quebec which is located on a peninsula on the north shore of the Gouin Reservoir;
- 85.4 kilometres (53.1 mi) south-west of Gouin Dam;
- 128.9 kilometres (80.1 mi) northwest of the village center of Wemotaci, Quebec (north shore of the Saint-Maurice River);
- 219 kilometres (136 mi) north-west of downtown La Tuque.

The mouth of Plamondon Creek meets with Plamondon Bay (Gouin Reservoir). From there, the current flows over 118.2 kilometres (73.4 mi) until Gouin Dam, according to the following segments:

- 7.9 kilometres (4.9 mi) south-east crossing the Plamondon Bay (Gouin Reservoir) and crossing some straits to Du Mâle Lake;
- 28.4 kilometres (17.6 mi) north-east across the Du Mâle Lake and west of Gouin Reservoir to the height of Obedjiwan, Quebec Village;
- 81.9 kilometres (50.9 mi) to the East, crossing the Marmette Lake, then to the South-East crossing in particular the Brochu Lake then to the East crossing the Kikendatch Bay until Gouin Dam.

From this dam, the current flows along the Saint-Maurice River to Trois-Rivières.

== Toponymy ==
The term "Plamondon" refers to a family name of English origin.

The toponym "Plamondon Creek" was formalized on December 5, 1968 at the Commission de toponymie du Québec, when it was created.

== See also ==
- Saint-Maurice River, a watercourse
- Gouin Reservoir, a water body
- Du Mâle Lake, a water body
- Plamondon Bay (Gouin Reservoir), a water body
- La Tuque, a territory equivalent to a RCM
- List of rivers of Quebec
