= Bourgeois Lake =

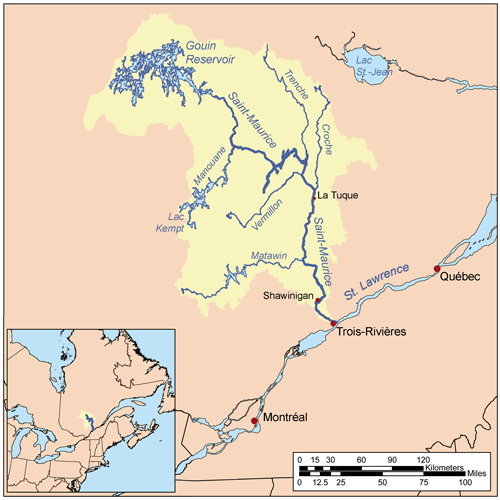
- Watershed of Saint-Maurice River

- Location within Quebec
- Location: La Tuque
- Coordinates: 48°38′14″N 75°00′52″W
- Type: Lake of dam
- Primary inflows: (clockwise from the mouth); Thibodeau Bay; Du Mâle Lake (Gouin Reservoir); Aiapew Bay.
- Primary outflows: Toussaint Lake
- Basin countries: Canada
- Max. length: 16.3 kilometres (10.1 mi)
- Max. width: 3.5 kilometres (2.2 mi)
- Surface elevation: 402 metres (1,319 ft)

The Bourgeois Lake is a freshwater body located in the north central part of the Gouin Reservoir, in the territory of the town of La Tuque, in the administrative region of the Mauricie, in the province of Quebec, in Canada.

This lake extends in the cantons of Lemay (southern part of the lake) and Toussaint (in the North).

Recreotourism activities are the main economic activity of the sector. Forestry comes second. Recreational boating is particularly popular on this water, especially for sport fishing.

The Lake Bourgeois hydrographic slope is served on the north side by secondary forest roads connected to the R2046 and R1045 forest roads that connect the village of Obedjiwan, Quebec.

The surface of Lake Bourgeois is usually frozen from mid-November to the end of April, however, safe ice circulation is generally from early December to the end of March. Water management at the Gouin Dam can lead to significant variations in the water level, particularly at the end of the winter when the water is lowered.

== Geography ==
Before the construction of the La Loutre Dam in 1916, creating the Gouin Reservoir, Lake Bourgeois had a smaller dimension. After the second raising of the waters in 1946 with the development of the Gouin Dam, Lake Bourgeois took on its present form.

The main hydrographic slopes near Lake Bourgeois are:

- north side: De la Rencontre Creek, Aiapew Bay, Tcikitinaw Bay, Toussaint River;
- east side: Kanatakompeak Bay, Kamitcikamak Lake, Toussaint Lake, Marmette Lake, McSweeney Lake, Magnan Lake;
- south side: Thibodeau Bay, Bureau Lake (North Bay), Rocher-Matci Bay;
- west side: Thibodeau Bay, Des Aigles Bay, Du Mâle Lake, Plamondon Creek, Berthelot River, Pascagama River.

The Lake Bourgeois is fed by the waters of the Du Mâle Lake (located to the West), Thibodeau Bay (located to the South) and Aiapew Bay (located in the North). The De la Rencontre Creek, coming from the North, flows into the Male Lake, almost at the north-west entrance of Lac Bourgeois.

With a length of 16.3 kilometres (10.1 mi) (North-South direction), Lake Bourgeois stretches to the narrow bay located in the northern part of the lake (being the Aiapew Bay which has a length of 3.2 kilometres (2.0 mi)) and the opposite to the bottom of the Wacihiskacik Bay (narrow bay) to the South. A peninsula stretching northward on 16.4 kilometres (10.2 mi) distinguishes the eastern side of Plamondon Bay and Lake Bourgeois; another peninsula stretching southward on 10.1 kilometres (6.3 mi) distinguishes the east side of the De la Rencontre Creek and Bourgeois Bay. These two peninsulas meet almost, forming a narrow passage where all the water of the western part of the Gouin Reservoir passes towards Kanatakompeak Bay (towards the East). Thus, this pass is a must to sail from the west to the north-central part of the Gouin Reservoir.

On the west side of the lake, an archipelago delimits Lake Bourgeois with the Du Mâle Lake. The largest of these islands has a length of 7.2 kilometres (4.5 mi) and a width of 3.1 kilometres (1.9 mi); it straddles the townships of Toussaint and Lemay. Thibodeau Bay is located on the south side of this island. The latter is located at 6.0 kilometres (3.7 mi) west of the village center of Obedjiwan, Quebec.

The mouth of Lake Bourgeois is located northeast of the lake, at:

- 17.0 kilometres (10.6 mi) north-east of the Kaopatinak Pass which separates the Du Mâle Lake in two;
- 4.2 kilometres (2.6 mi) west of the village center of Obedjiwan, Quebec which is located on a peninsula on the north shore of the Gouin Reservoir;
- 74.5 kilometres (46.3 mi) northwest of Gouin Dam;
- 124.5 kilometres (77.4 mi) northwest of the village center of Wemotaci, Quebec (north shore of the Saint-Maurice River);
- 213 kilometres (132 mi) north-west of downtown La Tuque;
- 317 kilometres (197 mi) northwest of the mouth of the Saint-Maurice River (confluence with the St. Lawrence River at Trois-Rivières).

From the mouth of Lake Bourgeois, the current flows over 86.1 kilometres (53.5 mi) until Gouin dam, according to the following segments:

- 4.2 kilometres (2.6 mi) easterly crossing Toussaint Lake to the south of Obedjiwan, Quebec village;
- 81.9 kilometres (50.9 mi) to the east, crossing in particular Marmette Lake, then to the South-East crossing notably Brochu Lake, then going across the Kikendatch Bay until Gouin Dam.
From this dam, the current flows along the Saint-Maurice River to Trois-Rivières where it flows onto the North Shore of the St. Lawrence River.

== Toponymy ==
The term "Bourgeois" is a family name of French origin.

The toponym "Lac Bourgeois" was formalized on December 18, 1986, by the Commission de toponymie du Québec .

== See also ==
- Saint-Maurice River, a watercourse
- Gouin Reservoir, a body of water
- Toussaint Lake, a body of water
- Du Mâle Lake, a body of water
- Rocher-Matci Bay, a body of water
- Thibodeau Bay, a body of water
- De la Rencontre Creek, a body of water
- Aiapew Bay, a body of water
- La Tuque, a city
- List of lakes in Canada
