= Lepage River =

Lepage
- Nottaway River basin in yellow

Location
- Country: Canada
- Province: Quebec
- Region: Abitibi-Témiscamingue

Physical characteristics
- Source: Confluence of two creeks
  - location: Senneterre, Quebec (parish), Abitibi-Témiscamingue, Quebec
  - coordinates: 48°15′37″N 77°07′51″W
  - elevation: 339 m (1,112 ft)
- Mouth: Senneterre River
  - location: Senneterre, Quebec, Abitibi-Témiscamingue, Quebec
  - coordinates: 48°23′25″N 77°10′47″W
  - elevation: 297 m (974 ft)
- Length: 20.2 km (12.6 mi)

The Lepage River is a tributary of the Senneterre River, flowing into the municipality of Senneterre, Quebec (parish) and Senneterre, Quebec, into the administrative region of Abitibi-Témiscamingue, in Quebec, in Canada. The course of the "river Lepage" crosses the townships of Tiblemont and Senneterre.

Forestry is the main economic activity of the sector; recreational tourism activities, second. The area is served by some secondary forest roads.

The surface of the river is usually frozen from mid-December to mid-April, however, safe ice circulation is generally from mid-December to late March.

== Geography ==
The hydrographic slopes adjacent to the "Lepage River" are:

- North side: Parent Lake (Abitibi), Mégiscane River;
- East side: Mégiscane River, Tavernier River;
- South side: Guillemette Creek, Guéguen Lake, Saint Vincent River;
- West side: Senneterre River, Tiblemont Lake, Bell River.

The Lepage River originates from a creek in a wetland at the confluence of two streams (elevation: 339 metres (1,112 ft)) at:

- 16.3 kilometres (10.1 mi) Southeast of the Canadian National Railway bridge over the Bell River at Senneterre, Quebec;
- 15.1 kilometres (9.4 mi) South of the mouth of the Lepage River (confluence with the Senneterre River);
- 8.6 kilometres (5.3 mi) South of the Canadian National Railway;
- 9.7 kilometres (6.0 mi) Northeast of a bay on the East shore of Tiblemont Lake.

From its source, the river Lepage flows over the 98th percentile into the back of the bus on a school trip.

- 3.8 kilometres (2.4 mi) northward in the township of Tiblemont to the southern limit of the town of Senneterre, Quebec;
- 8.5 kilometres (5.3 mi) in Senneterre, Quebec (township of Senneterre) northerly forming a deviation to the east to the Canadian National Railway;
- 7.9 kilometres (4.9 mi) north, then northwest, to mouth.

The mouth of the "Lepage River" flows on the eastern shore of the Senneterre River, is located in the forest zone at:

- 3.8 kilometres (2.4 mi) Northeast of the railway bridge spanning the Bell River to Senneterre, Quebec;
- 1.5 kilometres (0.93 mi) south of the mouth of the Senneterre River (confluence with Adolphus Bay of Parent Lake (Abitibi);
- 3.2 kilometres (2.0 mi) Northeast of the Canadian National Railway;
- 38.4 kilometres (23.9 mi) South of the mouth of Parent Lake (Abitibi).

== Toponymy ==
The term "Lepage" is a family name of French origin.

The toponym "Lepage River" was formalized on December 5, 1968, at the Commission de toponymie du Québec, at the creation of this commission.

== See also ==
- Bell River, a watercourse
- Lake Matagami, a body of water
- Nottaway River, a watercourse
- James Bay
- Jamésie
- Senneterre, Quebec (parish), a municipality
- Senneterre, Quebec, a city
- List of rivers of Quebec
