= Kekek River =

Kekek
- Watershed of Nottaway River

Location
- Country: Canada
- Province: Quebec
- Region: Abitibi-Témiscamingue

Physical characteristics
- Source: Unidentified Lake
  - location: Senneterre, La Vallée-de-l'Or Regional County Municipality (RCM), Abitibi-Témiscamingue, Quebec
  - coordinates: 48°00′45″N 75°43′41″W
  - elevation: 547 m (1,795 ft)
- Mouth: Mégiscane River
  - location: Senneterre, La Vallée-de-l'Or Regional County Municipality, Abitibi-Témiscamingue, Quebec
  - coordinates: 48°24′49″N 75°47′26″W
  - elevation: 390 m (1,280 ft)
- Length: 69.4 km (43.1 mi)

Basin features
- Tributaries
  - left: (upstream); Trévet River; outlet of lake Jean-Pierre; outlet of lakes Louise, Sylvie and Oride.
  - right: (upstream); outlet of lakes Doré and Renault; outlet of lake Robert; outlet of a set of lakes including Déserteur and Major; outlet of a set of lakes.

The Kekek River is a tributary of the Mégiscane River, flowing into the Senneterre area of La Vallée-de-l'Or Regional County Municipality, within the administrative region of Abitibi-Témiscamingue, in Quebec, Canada.

The Kekek River is located north of zec Festubert and south-west of Gouin Reservoir.

The Kekek River flows entirely through forest land. Forestry is the main economic activity of this hydrographic slope; with recreational tourism activities, second. The surface of the river is usually frozen from mid-December to mid-April.

== Geography ==
The Kekek River originates at the mouth of an unidentified lake (length: 1.1 kilometres (0.68 mi); altitude: 540 metres (1,770 ft)). This lake is surrounded by two series of mountains, one mountain top of which is 556 metres (1,824 ft) (south side), another of 482 metres (1,581 ft) (east side of the lake) and a third of 527 metres (1,729 ft) (North West side).

This head lake is located at:

- East of the watershed with the hydrographic slope of the head of the Chochocouane River flowing west, then southwest, to the Ottawa River;
- north-west of the watershed with the headwaters of the Gordon River (Chochocouane River);
- west of the watershed with the Esperey River.

The mouth of the head lake is located at 49.1 kilometres (30.5 mi) south-west of the confluence of the Kekek River with the Mégiscane River at 82.8 kilometres (51.4 mi) at East of downtown Senneterre, at 121.7 kilometres (75.6 mi) west of the village center of Parent and at 19.4 kilometres (12.1 mi) south of the Canadian National Railway.

The main hydrographic slopes near the Kekek River are:

- North side: Mégiscane River;
- East side: Hudson Creek, Lacoursière Lake, Suzie River;
- South side: Esperey River, Festubert River;
- West side: Trévet River, Trévet Lake, Chochocouane River.

From the mouth of the head lake, the Kekek River flows over 69.4 kilometres (43.1 mi) according to the following segments:

Upper Kekek River (segment of 19.9 kilometres (12.4 mi))

- 2.7 kilometres (1.7 mi) to the northeast passing between two sets of mountains and crossing five lakes, Mokoman Lake and the last lake at an altitude of 482 metres (1,581 ft), at the mouth of the last lake;
- 5.3 kilometres (3.3 mi) north-east to the outlet (coming from the south) of a small lake;
- 4.5 kilometres (2.8 mi) north-east to the discharge (from the east) of a group of lakes;
- 2.9 kilometres (1.8 mi) to the North, to the discharge (coming from the West) of a set of lakes;
- 4.5 kilometres (2.8 mi) north, to the dump (coming from the east of two lakes;

Intermediate course of the Kekek River (segment of 21.7 kilometres (13.5 mi))

- 14.4 kilometres (8.9 mi) northeasterly winding to the Canadian National Railway];
- 0.8 kilometres (0.50 mi) north-east to the outlet of a group of lakes including Baudin and Gasparri lakes;
- 6.5 kilometres (4.0 mi) north-east to the outlet of a group of lakes including Lakes Doré and Renault;

Lower course of the Kekek River (segment of 27.8 kilometres (17.3 mi))

- 11.2 kilometres (7.0 mi) north to the confluence of the Trévet River;
- 8.2 kilometres (5.1 mi) north to a bend in the river;
- 1.5 kilometres (0.93 mi) south-east to a bend of the river where the dump (coming from the south) of a group of lakes flows;
- 6.9 kilometres (4.3 mi) north, to the confluence of the river. Note: In this segment, the current forms jetties on 3.4 kilometres (2.1 mi).

The Kekek River discharges on the south shore of a lake (elevation: 390 metres (1,280 ft) formed by an elbow of the Mégiscane River which flows westward forming large zigzags and is a tributary of the eastern shore of Parent Lake (Abitibi), which is discharged into the Bell River, a tributary of Matagami Lake. The latest lac empties at its turn in the Nottaway River, a tributary of the southeast shore of James Bay.

This confluence of the Kekek River with the Mégiscane River is located 24.6 kilometres (15.3 mi) north of the Rouleau-Siding Stop on the Canadian National Railway at 100 kilometres (62 mi) east of the confluence of the Mégiscane River with Parent Lake (Abitibi), at 103.2 kilometres (64.1 mi) northwest of the center from Parent, to 11.6 kilometres (7.2 mi) west of Gouin Reservoir and 9.4 kilometres (5.8 mi) south of Pascagama Lake.

== Toponymy ==
The term "Kekek" is of Algonquin origin. His three k letter, forming a palindrome, is similar in pronunciation to the province of Quebec. This designation was indicated in its geographical exploration of 1906 by Eugène Rouillard in the form Kekeksipi, Kekek, Sparrowhawk and sipi, river.

The toponym "Kekek River" was formalized on December 5, 1968, at the Commission de toponymie du Québec.

== See also ==
- Matagami Lake, a body of water
- Trévet River, a watercourse
- Mégiscane River, a watercourse
- Bell River, a watercourse
- Nottaway River, a watercourse
- Parent Lake (Abitibi), a body of water
- Matagami Lake, a body of water
- Gouin Reservoir, a body of water
- Senneterre, a city
- La Vallée-de-l'Or Regional County Municipality (RCM)
- List of rivers of Quebec
