= Berthelot River =

Achepabanca North-East
- Watershed of Nottaway River

Location
- Country: Canada
- Province: Quebec
- Region: Abitibi-Témiscamingue

Physical characteristics
- Source: Leigne Lake
  - location: Senneterre, La Vallée-de-l'Or Regional County Municipality (RCM), Abitibi-Témiscamingue, Quebec
  - coordinates: 48°16′56″N 76°04′12″W
  - elevation: 397 m (1,302 ft)
- Mouth: Mégiscane River
  - location: Senneterre, La Vallée-de-l'Or Regional County Municipality, Abitibi-Témiscamingue, Quebec
  - coordinates: 48°31′55″N 76°08′21″W
  - elevation: 385 m (1,263 ft)
- Length: 21.0 km (13.0 mi)

Basin features
- Tributaries
  - left: (upstream); out of two lakes; outlet of Legros Lake; outlet of Boursier Lake; outlet of Baboune Lake.
  - right: (upstream); outlet of Rolland Lake; outlet of lakes Lalancette and "de la Ligne"; outlet of lake Saint-Laurent.

The Berthelot River is a tributary of the Mégiscane River, flowing into the townships of Leigne, Valmy and Berthelot, in the territory of Senneterre, in La Vallée-de-l'Or Regional County Municipality, in the Abitibi-Témiscamingue administrative region, in Quebec, in Canada.

The Berthelot River flows entirely in forest zone, west of the Gouin Reservoir. Forestry is the main economic activity of this hydrographic slope; recreational tourism activities, second. The surface of the river is usually frozen from mid-December to mid-April.

The west side of the Berthelot River head zone is served by a forest road from Forsythe. The head lake is near the Canadian National Railway which passes further south.

== Geography ==
The Berthelot River originates at the mouth of Lake Leigne (length: 2.5 kilometres (1.6 mi); maximum width: 1.8 kilometres (1.1 mi); altitude: 397 metres (1,302 ft)).

Lake Leigne feeds mainly on surrounding streams: Riton Creek (from the South), dump (coming from the South-East) of Telesphore and Guerly lakes, Lake Éclair dump (coming from the South-East), dump of a whole lakes (from the East) and Corbin Lake discharge (coming from the West). This head of water is located at:

- Northwesterly of the watershed with the Maude Lake hydrographic sub-slope forming the head lake of the Whitegoose River which flows northward to the Mégiscane River;
- North of the watershed with the Attic Lake watershed, which is the head lake of the Attic River. The latter usually flows south-west to discharge on the east bank of the Mégiscane River.

The mouth of Lake Leigne is located in Leigne Township, either at 11.5 kilometres (7.1 mi) north-west of the Canadian National Railway, or at the west side of Gagnon-Siding at 70.6 kilometres (43.9 mi) east of downtown Senneterre, 133.9 kilometres (83.2 mi) west of the village center of Parent and 20.1 kilometres (12.5 mi) south-west of the confluence of the Berthelot River with the Mégiscane River.

The main hydrographic slopes near the Berthelot River are:

- North side: Berthelot Lake (Mégiscane River), Mégiscane River;
- East side: Whitegoose River, Mégiscane Lake, Mégiscane River, Serpent River (Mégiscane River), Kekek River;
- South side: Whitegoose River, Serpent River (Mégiscane River), Attic River;
- West side: Canyon Creek, Lac aux Loups, Mégiscane River.

From the mouth of Lake Leigne, the Berthelot River flows over 21.0 kilometres (13.0 mi) according to the following segments:

- 3.0 kilometres (1.9 mi) north through Macho Lake (length: 1.9 kilometres (1.2 mi); altitude: 396 metres (1,299 ft)) to its mouth;
- 1.5 kilometres (0.93 mi) north to the south shore of Valmy Lake;
- 4.8 kilometres (3.0 mi) north across Valmy Lake (elevation: 388 metres (1,273 ft)) over almost its full length;
- 11.7 kilometres (7.3 mi) to the north, forming a widening of the river in the second half of this segment, until the confluence of the river.

The Berthelot River discharges on the south shore of Berthelot Lake (Mégiscane River) (elevation: 385 metres (1,263 ft)) which is crossed to the West by the Mégiscane River; the latter generally flows westward, forming large zigzags, as far as the east shore of Parent Lake (Abitibi). This last lake is crossed to the North by the Louvicourt River whose current will flow on the South shore of Tiblemont Lake.

This confluence of the Berthelot River with the Mégiscane River is located upstream from the confluence of the Achepabanca River and downstream from the confluence of the Whitegoose and Kekek at:

- 83.1 kilometres (51.6 mi) east of the confluence of the Mégiscane River;
- 17.8 kilometres (11.1 mi) northwest of the confluence of the Serpent River (Mégiscane River);
- 93.5 kilometres (58.1 mi) north-east of downtown Senneterre;
- 38.2 kilometres (23.7 mi) north of the former Gagnon-Siding Railway Station of the Canadian National Railway.

== Toponymy ==
The term "Berthelot" is a family name of French origin.

The toponym "Berthelot River" was formalized on December 5, 1968, at the Commission de toponymie du Québec, when it was created.

== See also ==
- Nottaway River, a watercourse
- Matagami Lake, a body of water
- Bell River, a watercourse
- Parent Lake (Abitibi), a body of water
- Mégiscane River, a watercourse
- Berthelot Lake (Mégiscane River), a body of water
- Senneterre, a city
- La Vallée-de-l'Or Regional County Municipality (RCM)
- List of rivers of Quebec
