= Pascagama River =

Pascagama
- Watershed of Nottaway River

Location
- Country: Canada
- Province: Quebec
- Region: Nord-du-Québec

Physical characteristics
- Source: Marceau Lake
  - location: La Tuque, Mauricie, Quebec
  - coordinates: 48°57′06″N 75°01′22″W
  - elevation: 464 m (1,522 ft)
- Mouth: Pascagama Lake
  - location: Senneterre, Abitibi-Témiscamingue, Quebec
  - coordinates: 48°37′52″N 75°33′25″W
  - elevation: 393 m (1,289 ft)
- Length: 82.5 km (51.3 mi)

The Pascagama River is a tributary of Pascagama Lake. It flows in the Northwest of Quebec, in Canada, in the administrative regions of:

- Mauricie: in the extreme west of the territory of the town of La Tuque (canton of Deschamps);
- Abitibi-Témiscamingue: in the easternmost part of Senneterre, in the La Vallée-de-l'Or Regional County Municipality (RCM), where is its mouth. In this region, the course of the river successively crosses the townships of Marceau, Buteux, Lagacé, Coursol and Juneau.

Forestry is the main economic activity of this watershed; recreational tourism activities come second.

The surface of the river is usually frozen from early November to the end of April, however, safe ice circulation is generally from early December to mid-April.

== Geography ==
The Pascagama River originates at the mouth of Lake Marceau (length: 4.5 kilometres (2.8 mi), altitude: 465 metres (1,526 ft)) in Marceau Township. The mouth of this lake is located at:
- 118.6 kilometres (73.7 mi) north-west of the village center of Parent, Quebec;
- 6.6 kilometres (4.1 mi) south of the boundary between the administrative regions of Mauricie (La Tuque) and the Eeyou Istchee Baie-James (municipality);
- 37.7 kilometres (23.4 mi) east of the boundary between the administrative regions of Mauricie (La Tuque) and Abitibi-Témiscamingue (Senneterre;
- 32.3 kilometres (20.1 mi) northwest of the village center of Obedjiwan;
- 127.4 kilometres (79.2 mi) north-east of downtown Senneterre;
- 52.9 kilometres (32.9 mi) north-east of the confluence of the Pascagama River with Parent Lake (Abitibi).

From the mouth of Marceau Lake, the Pascagama River flows over 82.5 kilometres (51.3 mi), according to the following segments:

- 13.9 kilometres (8.6 mi) northwesterly forming two northeasterly curves to the northeastern shore of an unidentified lake;
- 2.9 kilometres (1.8 mi) to the southwest, including crossing an unidentified lake (length: 2.1 kilometres (1.3 mi); altitude: 425 metres (1,394 ft), up to at the limit of the township of Buteux;
- 10.9 kilometres (6.8 mi) southwesterly in the township of Buteaux, to the limit of the canton of Lagacé;
- 19.5 kilometres (12.1 mi) southwesterly, forming a southward curve at the beginning of the segment, to the eastern limit of the township of Coursol;
- 4.4 kilometres (2.7 mi) southerly overlapping the limit of the Lagacé and Coursol townships, and forming a loop towards the east, to the middle of an unidentified lake (altitude: 394 metres (1,293 ft));
- 9.7 kilometres (6.0 mi) southwesterly through Coursol Township through areas of widening river to the northern limit of Juneau Township;
- 17.3 kilometres (10.7 mi) southwesterly in the township of Juneau, forming a hook to the east of 0.6 kilometres (0.37 mi) to the east limit of the township of Deschamps;
- 3.9 kilometres (2.4 mi) to the southwest in Deschamps Township in Senneterre to the mouth of the river.

The Pascagama River flows on the north shore of Pascagama Lake in the Township of Deschamps to:

- 16.3 kilometres (10.1 mi) west of Gouin Reservoir;
- 45.9 kilometres (28.5 mi) south-west of village center of Obedjiwan;
- 127.6 kilometres (79.3 mi) north-east of downtown Senneterre;
- 110.6 kilometres (68.7 mi) north-east of the mouth of Parent Lake (Abitibi);
- 20.4 kilometres (12.7 mi) north of the mouth of Pascagama Lake which flows into the Mégiscane River.

== Toponymy ==
The term "Pascagama" is of Algonquin origin and refers to a camp, dam, lake and river. The toponym "Pascagama River" was formalized on December 5, 1968, at the Commission de toponymie du Québec, when the commission was created.

== See also ==
- Nottaway River, a watercourse
- Matagami Lake, a body of water
- Bell River, a watercourse
- Parent Lake (Abitibi), a body of water
- Mégiscane River, a watercourse
- Chartrand River, a watercourse
- Pascagama Lake, a watercourse
- Senneterre, a city
- La Tuque, a city
- La Vallée-de-l'Or Regional County Municipality (RCM)
- List of rivers of Quebec
