= Bostonnais =

Bostonnais may refer to:

== Place names ==
- Little Bostonnais River, La Tuque (City), Mauricie, Quebec, Canada
- Bostonnais River, La Tuque (City), Mauricie, Quebec, Canada
- La Bostonnais, Quebec (municipality), La Tuque, Mauricie, Quebec, Canada
- Grand Lake Bostonnais, La Tuque (urban agglomeration), Mauricie, Quebec, Canada
- Grand River Bostonnais (Portneuf), Portneuf Regional County Municipality, National Capitale Region, Quebec, Canada

== Other uses ==
- Jean-Baptiste Bostonnais, a trapper Abenaki, namesake of La Bostonnais, Quebec
