= Croche =

Croche can refer to the following geographical features in Quebec, Canada:

- Croche Lake, in Sainte-Thècle
- Croche River (La Tuque)
- Lac-Croche
- Zec de la Croche

== See also ==
- Aiguille Croche, mountain in France
- L'Arbre Croche, Odawa settlement in Michigan, United States
- Marais Croche, Missouri, United States
- Crochet (disambiguation)
