= Zec Menokeosawin =

Zec Ménokéosawin
- Location within Quebec
- Location: Canada Quebec La Tuque
- Nearest city: La Tuque, Quebec
- Coordinates: 47°45′N 72°24′W
- Area: 298.5 square kilometres (115.3 sq mi)
- Established: 1978
- Governing body: Association de chasse-pêche de la rivière Bostonnais Nord (Association of hunting-fishing of North River Bostonnais)

The Zec Ménokéosawin is a "zone d'exploitation contrôlée" (controlled harvesting zone), located in the region of Mauricie, in Quebec, Canada. This public hunting and fishing area is managed by the "Association de chasse-pêche de la rivière Bostonnais Nord" (Association of hunting - fishing Bostonnais North River), a non-profit organization.

== Territory ==
The ZEC Ménokéosawin which has 162 lakes, is an area of 298.5 square kilometres (115.3 sq mi), located on the territory of La Tuque and Lac-Édouard. Located in the area of the East bank of the Saint-Maurice River, the Zec extends on 32 km maximum width and 31 km maximum in height.

Zec is bordered by Zec Kiskissink on East side and Zec Borgia to the west. The Bostonnais River constitutes the northwestern boundary of Zec (except the northern part of the Bostonnais River where Route 155 is used as the boundary). The southeastern boundary of the territory is bounded by the road leading to the village of Lac Édouard and extends to a bay at the northeast of Lac Édouard (lake). The northeastern boundary of Zec is the "lac du barrage" (dam lake) and the "Bonhomme Lake"

Zec Ménokéosawin is crossed by the Bostonnais River, arriving from the north and passing through the lake Maggie, then lake Deveny. This river has a tributary designated "Channel Bostonians", which start from the lake "North Branch" and "Southern Branch" and it empties into the Bostonnais River at southwest area of Zec.

The main lakes in the Zec are: Bouchard, Angrois, Girard, Croche, "en Voûte", "de la Branche Sud", "de la Cloison", Devenys, Maggie, "du Cap", Racine, Catherine, Farouche, Du Bonnet" and "du Coudrier".

ZEC has four campsites and several water boat ramps.

== Activities ==
The position of the Zec entry station is located at km 167 on Route 155 North. Zec offers rustic campsites and accommodation in few rustic cottages.

Zec is primarily a hunting and fishing area; several lakes are available to tease especially trout (speckled trout), Arctic char (brook trout), walleye, pike, perch or whitefish. In autumn, the hunt is on for moose, bears and small preys

== Toponymy ==
The name "Zec Ménokéosawin" was recorded on August 5, 1982 at the Bank of place names in Commission de toponymie du Québec (Geographical Names Board of Québec)

== See also ==
- Lac-Édouard
- La Tuque
- La Tuque (urban agglomeration)
- Bostonnais River
- Zec Borgia
- Zec Kiskissink
- Zone d'exploitation contrôlée (Controlled harvesting zone) (ZEC)
