= Lake Lescarbot =

Lake in Quebec, Canada

- Location within Quebec
- Location: La Tuque (urban agglomeration), Mauricie, Quebec
- Coordinates: 47°48′42″N 72°04′04″W
- Type: natural
- Primary inflows: Bostonnais River
- Primary outflows: Bostonnais River
- Basin countries: Canada

The Lake Lescarbot is located in the La Tuque (urban agglomeration), in Mauricie, in Quebec, in Canada. The territory is administered by Zec Kiskissink.

== Geography ==
Lake Lescarbot is shaped like a large V, with three peninsula emerging from the eastern shore, south of the lake. The left arm of the V has a length of 4.8 km, against 3.5 km for the right arm of V.

Lake Lescarbot is fed by six main discharges:

- "Lac du billot" (Lake of block) (5.2 miles north). Note: the Aegis lake is a tributary of the outlet of the "lac du billot",
- Lake Asik (3.7 km East),
- Lake of Bauge (6.3 km East) which is located almost at the water line breaker,
- Lake Ventadour (1.1 km to the south), which is regarded as the first head of the Bostonnais River,
- Lake André-Louis (4 miles west).
- Grand Lake macousine (2 km to the west).

The mouth of the lake is at the top of the left arm of the V. River outlet of Lake Lescarbot is 3.2 km long (measured by water) and flows to the south of Lake Kiskissink.

Lescarbot lake is located near (west side) of the boundary waters between the Métabetchouane River and Bostonnais River.

== Toponymy ==
The origin of the name is related to Marc Lescarbot, a Frenchman born at Versins in Picardy, in 1570, a scholar, lawyer, traveler, writer, broker. He came to settle in Port Royal, Nova Scotia, in 1606. However, in 1607, he had to return to France because of the revocation of the monopoly of the fur trade held by Pierre du Gua de Monts. Upon his arrival back in France, Lescarbot began writing a history of New France, which during his lifetime was published in three editions (1609, 1611-1612 and 1617-1618), enriched whenever he was able to get new information from people who returned to France after living in French Canada. Each edition of this work includes "The Neptune Theatre", a play composed and performed in 1606 to celebrate the return of Jean de Biencourt Poutrincourt from his posting as commander of Port Royal. This play was probably the first stage performance in North America.

The name "Lake Lescarbot" was officially registered on 6 December 1968 in the databank of place names of the Commission de toponymie du Québec (Geographical Names Board of Québec).

== See also ==
- La Tuque (urban agglomeration)
- Zec Kiskissink
- Lake Kiskissink
- Grand Lake Bostonnais
- Bostonnais River
- Lake Ventadour (La Tuque)
