= Ventadour Lake (La Tuque) =

Lake in La Tuque, Quebec, Canada

Lake Ventadour
- Location within Quebec
- Location: La Tuque (urban agglomeration), Mauricie, Quebec
- Coordinates: 47°45′46″N 72°02′12″W
- Type: natural
- Primary inflows: Discharge of "Lake Chalet"
- Primary outflows: Bostonnais River
- Basin countries: Canada
- Max. length: 4.6 km (2.9 mi)
- Max. width: 1.3 km (0.81 mi)

The lac Ventadour is the main headwater lake of the Bostonnais River. This lake is located in the La Tuque (urban agglomeration), in Mauricie, in Quebec, in Canada. The area around the lake is mostly administered by the Zec Kiskissink.

== Geography ==
South shore of Lake Ventadour is located at 20 km (in direct line) at the northeast of the town of Lac-Edouard, 60.6 km east of La Tuque downtown and 63 miles southwest of Lac Saint-Jean.

Lake Ventadour has the shape of a duck in flight, landing to the west, seen in profile. The spout is positioned to the north, which is also the mouth of the lake. This lake has a length of 4.6 km in the north-south direction and a maximum width of 1.3 km (at the level of two bays). A 2.3 km long strait (with a 90 degree elbow with 0.9 km wide) is located north-east, and this strait looks like the duck wings.

The stream discharge (2.6 km long) of "Lake Chalet" flows in the extreme south of Lake Ventadour. Dozens of lakes near the "Lake Chalet" are part of a watershed of Saint-Maurice River or the one of Métabetchouane River because of the line breaker water.

Lake Vendatour, Lake Lescarbot, Lake Kiskissink and a segment of the Bostonnais River form on 23 km in north-south direction a chain of water bodies which discharge into the Bostonnais River from the north; the latest flows into the Saint-Maurice River where it pours in La Tuque.

This chain of water bodies is located parallel to the west of the Métabetchouane River. In contrast, it is discharged into the Lac Saint-Jean. The distance between the Métabetchouane River and the major lakes are: Lake Kiskissink (2.5 km), Lake Lescarbot (4.8 km) and Lake Ventadour (5.4 km).

In Native American history, as well as the time of the "coureurs des bois" (wooden runners) practicing fur trade, this area was conducive to the transfer of a watershed to another: that of the Métabetchouane River and Saint-Maurice River.

== Toponymy ==
The name "Lake Ventadour" honors Henri de Lévis (1596 - 1651), 13th Duke of Ventadour and peer of France, Prince of Maubuisson, Earl of Voulte, lord of Cheylard Vauvert and other places, lieutenant general of Louis XIII in Languedoc ally Condé, Vice King of New France (1625–1631).

After serving his country as a soldier, he took holy orders and 1625 he bought his uncle, the Duke Henri II de Montmorency, the vice-royalty of the New France in order to finance the Jesuit missions. It is also a founding member of the companionship of the Holy Sacrament in 1627. In 1650 he became a Canon (priest) of Notre-Dame de Paris.

This name was officially registered on December 5, 1968 in the Bank of place names in Commission de toponymie du Québec (Geographical Names Board of Québec)

== See also ==
- La Tuque (urban agglomeration)
- Bostonnais River
- Lake Lescarbot
- Lake Kiskissink
- Zec Kiskissink
- Lac-Édouard (municipality)
