= Zec Borgia =

- Location within Quebec
- Location: La Tuque, Québec, Canada
- Nearest city: La Tuque
- Coordinates: 47°49′12″N 72°34′07″W
- Area: 556 square kilometres (215 sq mi)
- Established: 1978
- Governing body: Association de chasse et de pêche Asitabec inc.

The ZEC Borgia is a "zone d'exploitation contrôlée" (controlled harvesting area) (ZEC) located in La Tuque (urban agglomeration), in administrative region of Mauricie, Quebec, Canada.

This hunting and fishing 556 square kilometres (215 sq mi) is administered by the Association de chasse et de pêche Asitabec inc (Association of Hunting and Fishing Asitabec Inc). This zec is entirely a forested area with wildlife vocation.

== Toponymy ==
His name contains the Lake and the Township of Borgia, named in honor of Joseph Le Vasseur Borgia, a member of Lower Canada parliament from 1808 to 1819 and from 1824 to 1830.

== Geography ==
Zec Borgia is located 35 km north of La Tuque or at km 145 of the Quebec Route 155. The docking station # 1 is located 500 meters from Highway 155, # 147 mileage. Zec is bounded by:

- The Saguenay-Lac-Saint-Jean to the north,
- ZECs Kiskissink and la Petite Trinité, as well as the "Outfitter Rochu" on east. Note: Route 155 is the boundary between zec Borgia and other ZEC on the east,
- The Croche River (La Tuque), the Tourist Area of La Tuque and ZEC de la Croche to the west.

The territory of the ZEC covers four townships: Biart, Chasseur, Borgia and Micheaux. Zec counts 194 lakes in total in his territory of which 59 are used for fishing, as well as three rivers. The main lakes on this territory are: Deschênes, Chasseur, Caron, "à Shaw", Gingras, Borgia (located at center-ouest near route 155), Armstrong, "de la Serpe", Barbelle, "du Jonc", "de la Fourchette", Jeanne, Biard and Gravel.

The Borgia lake has a length of 3.6 km and a maximum width of 0.6 km. This lake is oriented in a north-east to south-west along the north side of Quebec Route 155 at a distance ranging from 0.7 to 1.5 km.

== See also ==
- La Tuque, Quebec
- Bostonnais River
- Mauricie
- Croche River (La Tuque)
- Zone d'exploitation contrôlée (Controlled harvesting zone) (ZEC)
