= Zec de la Croche =

Zec La Croche
- Location within Quebec
- Location: Canada, Quebec, Mauricie
- Nearest city: La Tuque (urban agglomeration)
- Coordinates: 47°44′00″N 72°49′22″W
- Area: 351.8 square kilometres (135.8 sq mi)
- Established: 1978
- Governing body: Association Sacerf La Croche

The ZEC La Croche is a "zone d'exploitation controlée" (controlled harvesting zone) (ZEC) in La Tuque (urban agglomeration), in administrative region of Mauricie, in Québec, in Canada. This public hunting and fishing area is located 18 km north of La Tuque and offers the public an area of 351.8 square kilometres (135.8 sq mi). The Zec is managed by the "Sacerf La Croche Association".

== Origin of name ==
Zec La Croche takes its name from the Croche River (La Tuque), which serves also as the Eastern limit of the Zec. The toponym Zec la Croche was officialized on December 18, 1986, at the bank of place names of Commission de toponymie du Quebec.

== Geography ==
The "Zec la Croche" has an area of 351.8 square kilometres (135.8 sq mi) and is located north of the village of La Croche in La Tuque. The Zec is located between the Croche River (La Tuque) on the East; and the rivers Saint-Maurice and Trenche to the West. The Zec includes 97 lakes and all of these flow to the Saint-Maurice River.

In terms of geology, the ZEC is part of Laurentian Mountains. The altitude of the territory varies between 156 and 447 m.

== See also ==
- Croche River (La Tuque)
- La Tuque (urban agglomeration)
- Saint-Maurice River
- Zone d'exploitation contrôlée (Controlled Harvesting Zone) (ZEC)
