= Ducharme Bridge =

Ducharme Bridge Pont Ducharme
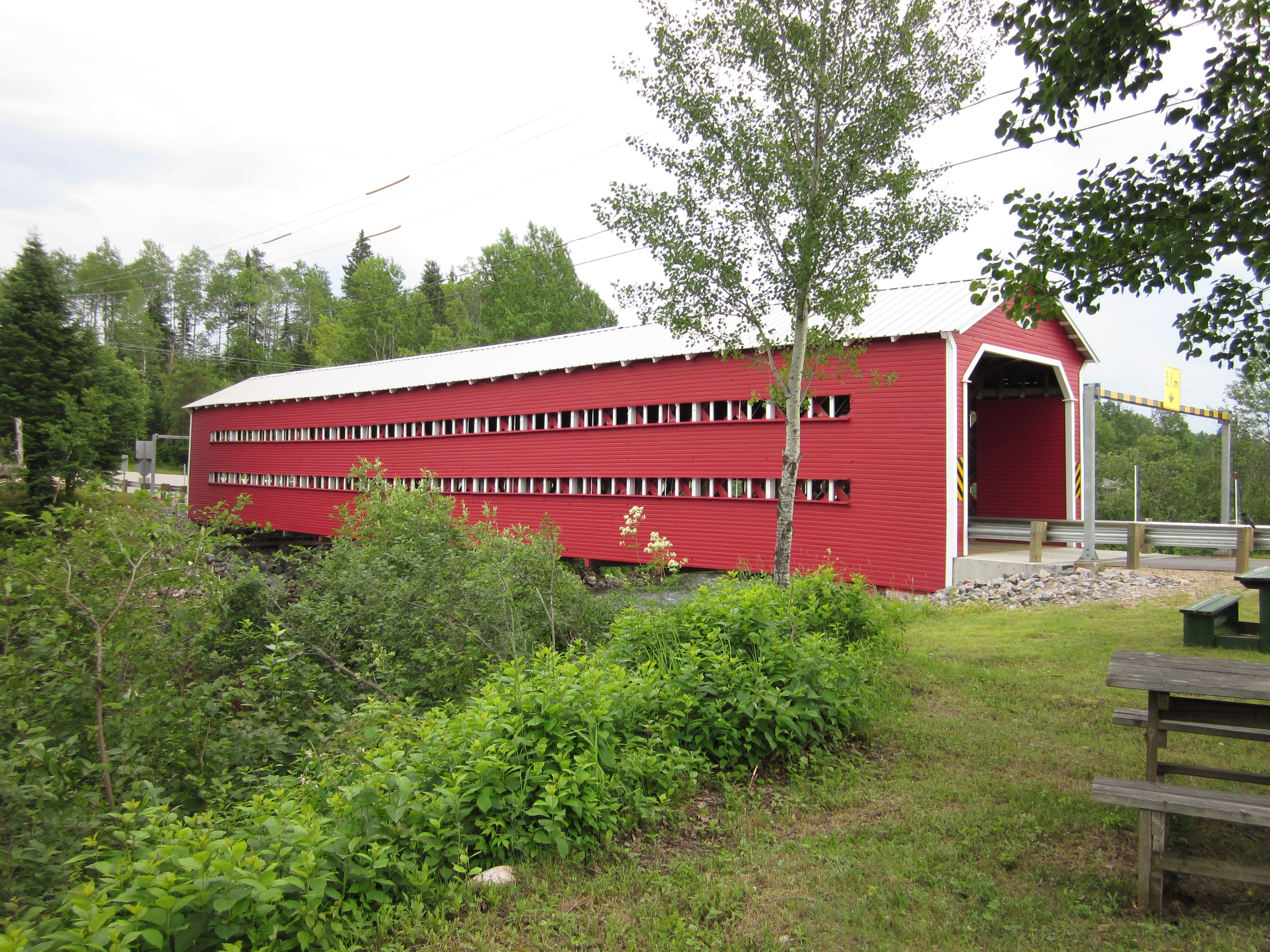
- Ducharme Bridge from the west.
- Coordinates: 47.51972°N 72.68083°W
- Crosses: Bostonnais River
- Locale: La Bostonnais, Quebec, Canada

Characteristics
- Design: Lattice truss
- Material: Spruce
- Total length: 41.76 m (137.0 ft)
- Width: 6.55 m (21.5 ft)

History
- Opened: 1948

Location
- Interactive map of Ducharme Bridge

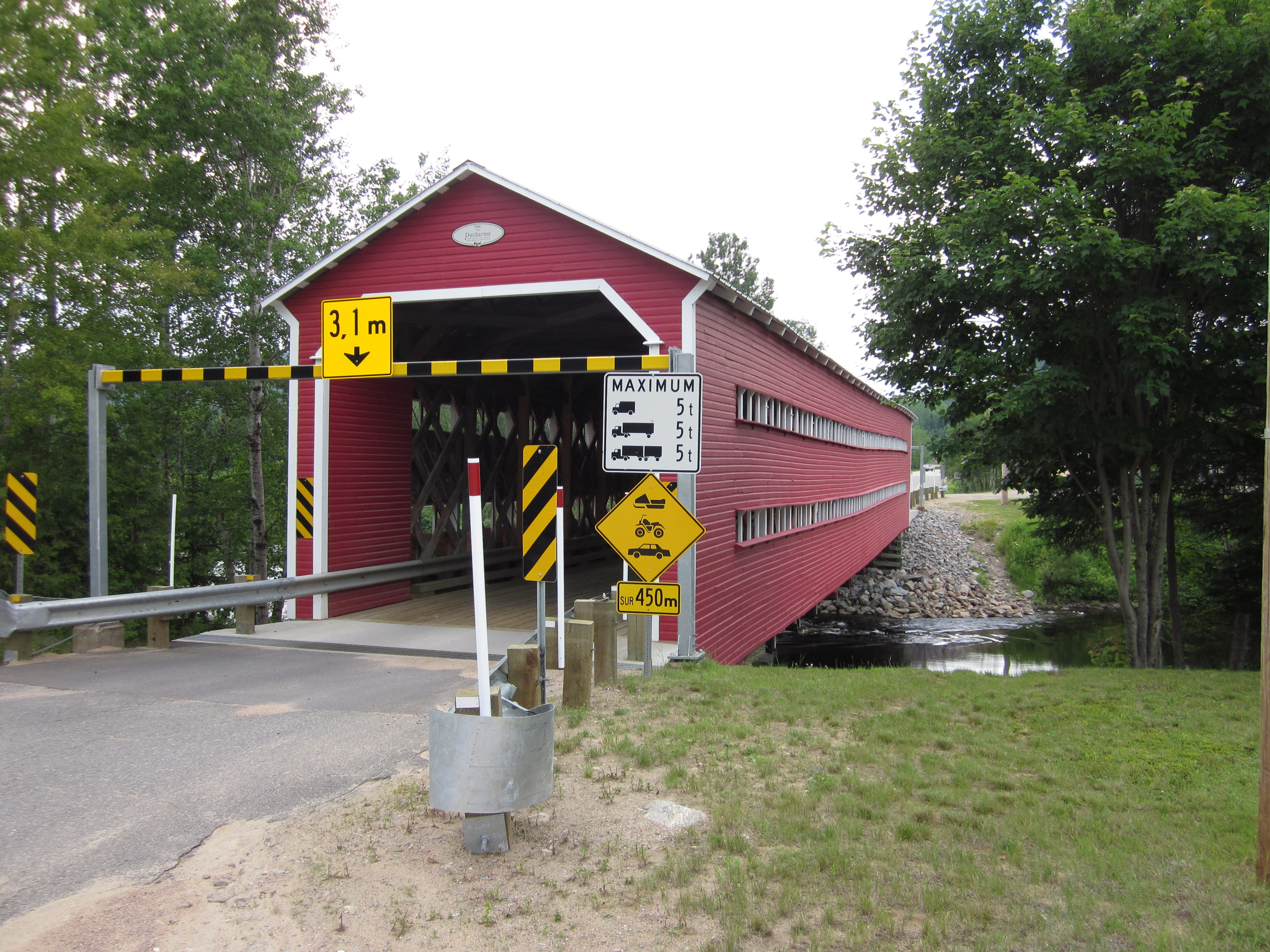
Another view of the Ducharme Bridge, showing some of the many height and load limit signs installed to protect it.

The Ducharme Bridge (French: Pont Ducharme) is a covered bridge with a lattice truss structure, which crosses the Bostonnais River in the center of La Bostonnais, Quebec. The bridge was built in 1946 and it is 41.76 metres (137.0 ft) long. It was classified as a historic monument in 2006, because it was a late example of an elaborated town bridge, a truss developed by the Departement of colonization of Quebec at the turn of the 20th century. It was named after Romulus Ducharme, MLA of Laviolette in 1936-1939 and 1944–1966.
