= Crochet (disambiguation) =

Crochet is a process of creating textiles by using a crochet hook.

Crochet may also refer to:

- Crochet (insect anatomy), part of the anatomy of certain insect larvae
- Crochet (surname), a surname
- Crochet bikini, a bikini / swimsuit crafted from yarn
- Crochet braids, technique for braiding hair
- Crochet hook, implement used to make loops in thread or yarn and to interlock them into crochet stitches
- Crochet thread, specially formulated thread usually made from mercerized cotton
- Crochet Guild of America, an American association to encourage crocheting

== See also ==
- Croche (disambiguation)
- Crockett
- Crotchet
