= Lake Kiskissink =

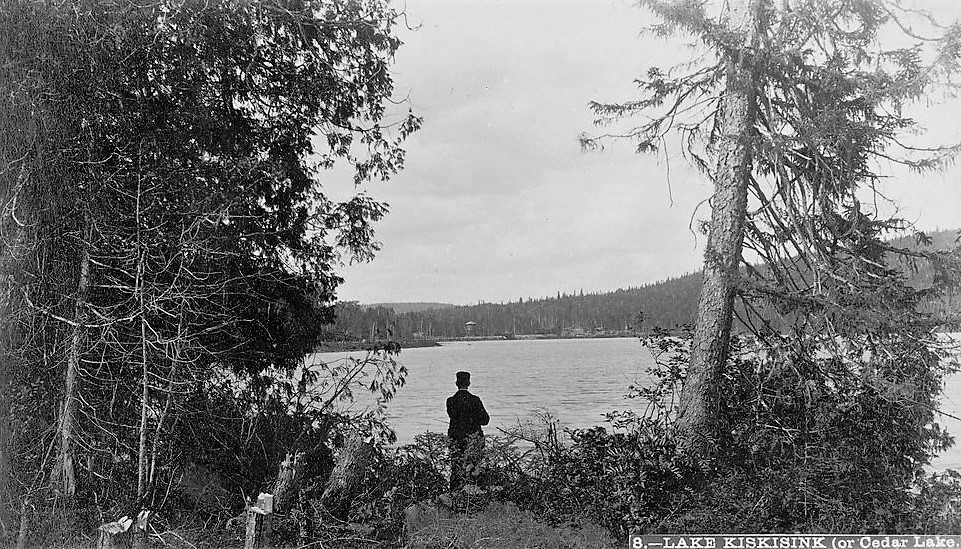

- Location within Quebec
- Location: La Tuque (urban agglomeration), Mauricie, Quebec
- Coordinates: 47°54′29″N 72°07′48″W
- Lake type: natural
- Basin countries: Canada
- Max. length: 11.2 km (7.0 mi)
- Max. width: 1.7 km (1.1 mi)
- Surface elevation: 416 m (1,365 ft)

The Lake Kiskissink is located in the La Tuque (urban agglomeration), in Mauricie, in Quebec, in Canada. The area surrounding the lake is administered by the Zec Kiskissink

== Geography ==
Located at 63 km (direct line) northeast of La Tuque downtown, 42 km (direct line) southwest of Chambord, and 21 km north east of Lac-Édouard, the Kiskissink lake has a very elongated shape in the north-south direction. The lake has a length of 11.2 km and a maximum width of 1.7 km (considering a bay). This lake is formed in parallel to the Grand Lake Bostonnais, located fifteen kilometers to the west side. Kiskissink Lake is located in the cantons of Rhodes and Lescarbot. The average level of the surface of the lake is at an altitude of 416 m. Some surrounding mountains exceed 460 m. Kiskissink the lake and its southern neighbor, the Lescarbot lake, are located along the boundary waters with the watershed of Lac Saint-Jean (Métabetchouan river); this line breaker is between one and two km (the east side) depending on location.

The Kiskissink lake is fed by the south by the discharge of Lake Lescarbot feeds the head of the Bostonnais River. From the mouth (located at the North) of Lake Kiskissink, a segment of the Bostonnais River flowing north, then west, has a length of 8.2 km (3.8 km which river and along the Strait of 4.4 km which is a long bay Grand Lake Bostonnais).

The locality (village) of Kiskissink is located at the end of a long bay at the north-west of Lake Kiskissink.

== Toponymy ==
From Algonquin and Montagnais, this name means "little cedar" in the past, the lake Kiskissink was designated "Cedar Lake". The name "Lake Kiskissink" was officially registered on December 5, 1968, at the Bank of place names in Commission de toponymie du Québec (Geographical Names Board of Québec).

== History ==
=== Prehistory ===
Several artifacts from Amerindian prehistory have been found in this area of the Haute-Mauricie where thirty sites of archaeological potential were identified. Several indigenous, usually semi-nomadic communities were passing through this area at different times. Because of the separation between the upper-Métabetchouane River and the upper-Saint-Maurice River, this sector has become an area of transition between the two watersheds. For example, in 1630, Aboriginal communities were passing through this area for which lake Kiskissink was a center of interest.

The Métabetchouane River and Bostonnais River served ice road in winter or waterways to end supply. Several indigenous communities living in seminomadism or met in the areas near these two rivers. Barter was widely practiced among communities. Of indigenous wood runners engaged in trade between the various communities.

=== European settlement ===
The first non-indigenous farmers of this area and the first settlers arrived in the late 1800s, mainly due to the arrival of the railway from Montreal and passing by Lac-Édouard. The route of this railway passes on the west side of the northern half of Lake Kiskissink, to serve the hamlets Kiskissink and Van Bruyssels.

The arrival of the railway is the main factor in the creation of private hunting and fishing clubs in the area. Several prominent figures, Canadian or American, there were practicing tourist activities

== See also ==
- La Tuque (city)
- La Tuque (urban agglomeration)
- Saint-Maurice River
- Bostonnais River
- Grand Lake Bostonnais
- La Bostonais (municipality)
- Métabetchouane River
