= Crochet (surname) =

Crochet is a surname. Notable people with the surname include:

- Cliff Crochet (born 1983), American professional bass fisherman
- Évelyne Crochet (born 1934), Franco-American classical pianist
- Garrett Crochet (born 1999), American professional baseball pitcher

== See also ==
- Crochet (disambiguation)
