= List of viceroys of New France =

Canadian politician

This article presents a list of the viceroys of New France in chronological table form.

Jean-François Roberval was appointed in 1540 by Francis I his lieutenant and governor for his lands in Canada. A number of authors cited in his bibliography named him first viceroy of Canada.

Name	Picture	Start	End	Sovereign
Troilus de Mesqouez		1578	2 August 1589	Henri III
Troilus de Mesqouez		2 August 1589	1603	Henri IV
Charles de Bourbon, Count of Soissons		8 October 1612	1 November 1612	Louis XIII
Henri de Bourbon, Prince of Condé		20 November 1612	10 February 1620	Louis XIII
French: Marshal Pons de Lauzières-Thémines		1 September 1616	20 October 1619	Louis XIII
Henri II de Montmorency, 4th Duke of Montmorency		10 February 1620	1624	Louis XIII
French: Henri de Lévis, Duke of Ventadour		March 1625	June 1627	Louis XIII
Isaac de Razilly		20 April 1632	2 July 1636	Louis XIII
French: François-Christophe, Duke of Damville		November 1644	1660	Louis XIV
French: Isaac Pas, Marquess of Feuquières		30 August 1660	5 October 1661	Louis XIV
Godefroi, Comte d'Estrades		1662	26 February 1686	Louis XIV
Jean II d'Estrées		1 August 1687	19 May 1707	Louis XIV
Victor Marie, Count of Estrées		19 May 1707	1 September 1715	Louis XIV
Victor Marie, Count of Estrées		1 September 1715	27 December 1737	Louis XV

== Annex ==
=== Bibliography ===
- Joseph Desjardins, Guide parlementaire historique de la Province de Québec. 1792 à 1902, Québec, 1902, 434 p. (en ligne)

=== Related articles ===
- Governor of New France
