= Zec Kiskissink =

ZEC in Mauricie, Quebec, Canada

- Location within Quebec
- Location: La Tuque (urban agglomeration), La Côte-de-Beaupré Regional County Municipality, La Jacques-Cartier Regional County Municipality, Lac-Saint-Jean-Est Regional County Municipality and Le Domaine-du-Roy Regional County Municipality, Quebec
- Nearest city: La Tuque
- Coordinates: 47°51′00″N 72°14′00″W
- Area: 829.5 square kilometres (320.3 sq mi)
- Established: 1978
- Governing body: Association Sacerf Macousine

The Zec Kiskissink is a "zone d'exploitation contrôlée" (controlled harvesting zone) (zec), located in the administrative region of the Mauricie, the Capitale-Nationale and Saguenay-Lac-Saint-Jean, in Quebec, in Canada. This wild territory, used for recreative activities (ATV, snowmobile, camping, hunting, fishing…) is managed by the "Sacerf Macousine Association".

The mission of the Zec Kiskissink has multiple turns: forestry, wildlife and recreation. The outdoor enthusiasts can practice a variety of outdoor activities in the territory, such as fishing, hunting, camping (furnished and semi-furnished), hiking, trekking, mountain biking, canoeing. .. Zec also offers the possibility of renting fully equipped chalets, different boats (canoes, kayaks, rowboats) and motors.

== Territory ==
Zec Kiskissink covers an area of 829.5 square kilometres (320.3 sq mi). It is located in:

- The city of La Tuque, Quebec and the municipality of Lac-Édouard, Quebec, in La Tuque (urban agglomeration), in Mauricie;
- Municipality Lac-Bouchette in Le Domaine-du-Roy Regional County Municipality and the territory of Lac-Moncouche, Quebec in Lac-Saint-Jean-Est Regional County Municipality, in the Saguenay-Lac-Saint-Jean;
- The unorganized territory of La Jacques-Cartier, Quebec in the La Côte-de-Beaupré Regional County Municipality and the unorganized territory of Lac-Croche, Quebec in the La Jacques-Cartier Regional County Municipality in the administrative region of the Capitale-Nationale.

Zec is located in Laurentian Mountains and covers an area where are the ridges of the watershed between the three major watersheds. Zec is bordered by Laurentides Wildlife Reserve to the east, by the Zec Borgia to the west and by the Zec la Petite Trinité southwest.

== Toponymy ==
The name "Zec Kiskissink" originates from Lake Kiskissink, one of its major water bodies, located in the north-eastern part of the territory. This lake is located about 400 meters, just south of the line of the watershed between the Lake Saint-Jean and Saint-Maurice River; therefore it is part of the watershed of the St. Lawrence River. With a length of 12 km and a width of 1.4 km, Lake Kiskissink receives water from lakes Lescarbot and Ventadour, located to the south.

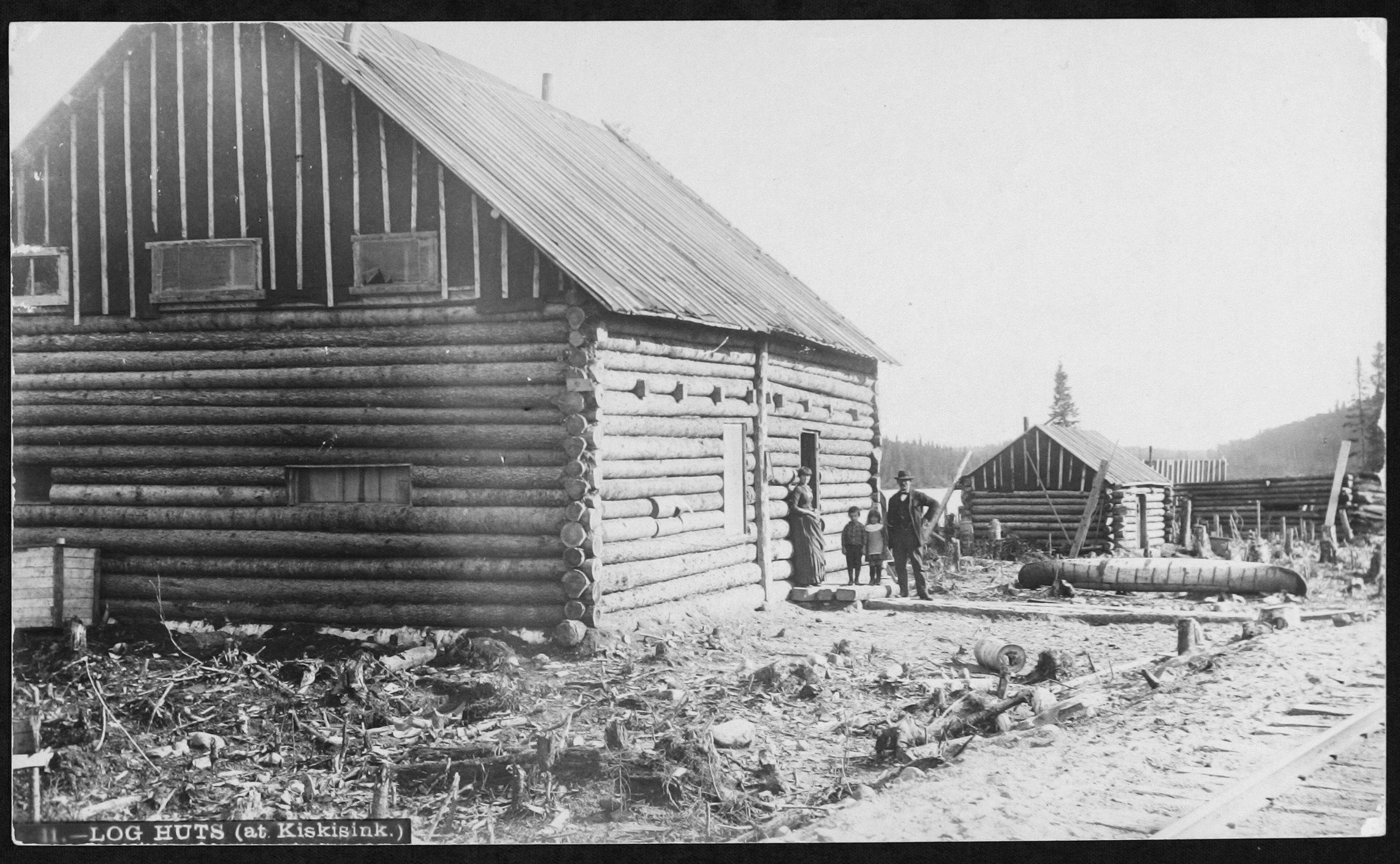
Zec Kiskissink, c. 1900

Lake Kiskissink feeds the Bostonnais River and Grand Lake Bostonnais. The arrival of the railroad in the early 1890s, linking Hervey-Jonction and Lac-Saint-Jean, led to the implementation of a hunting and club near the lake outlet. Some pioneers implemented a hamlet. A post office was laid in 1889 under the name Kiskising; it was renamed Kiskissink in 1963 and closed in 1972. Today this hamlet is deserted and became a place called Kiskissink. This appellation of origin is both Algonquin and Montagnais and serve on small cedar. In Algonquin language, it consists of kijik, cedar, iss, a diminutive and ing, a renta. In Montagnais, the first component is kisk, the other being identical to Algonquin. The lake has long been known as Cedar Lake.

The toponym "Zec Kiskissink" was registered as of August 5, 1982 at the Bank of places names at Commission de toponymie du Québec.

== Related Items ==
- La Tuque (urban agglomeration)
- Mauricie
- Bostonnais River
- Grand Lake Bostonnais
- Lake Kiskissink
- Lake Lescarbot
- Lake Ventadour (La Tuque)
- Métabetchouane River
- Zone d'exploitation contrôlée (Controlled Harvesting Zone) (ZEC)
