= Grand Lake Bostonnais =

Lake in Quebec, Canada

- Location within Quebec
- Location: La Tuque (urban agglomeration), Mauricie
- Coordinates: 47°54′01″N 72°14′03″W
- Type: natural
- Primary outflows: Bostonnais River
- Basin countries: Canada
- Max. length: 10.8 km (6.7 mi)
- Max. width: 2.8 km (1.7 mi)
- Surface elevation: 413 m (1,355 ft)

The Grand Lake Bostonnais is located in the La Tuque (urban agglomeration), in the administrative region of Mauricie, in Quebec, Canada. This lake is an important body of water is feeding the Bostonnais River which pours at La Tuque in Saint-Maurice River. The territory around Grand Lake Bostonnais is entirely in forest.

== Geography ==
Located at 62 km (measured in a direct line) northeast of the city of La Tuque, Grand Lake Bostonnais is encased between mountains. The surface of this lake which is frozen from November to April, has an average elevation of 413 meters above sea level. The north end of the lake is located at a distance of 4.4 kilometers south of the Quebec route 155 which links La Tuque and Chambord, Lac Saint-Jean.

Grand Lake Bostonnais has a length of 10.8 km in the north-south direction. The southern part of the lake is 2.4 km wide and 2.8 km for northern part. A large island occupies the center of the southern part of the lake. A dozen other small islands are scattered mostly in the northern part of the lake.

The lake is fed mostly on the east side by the discharge of the Lake Kiskissink; the latest is fed from the South by the discharge of Lescarbot Lake. Lake Kiskissink length is made parallel to the "Grand Lake Bostonnais". From the mouth of Lake Kiskissink, this segment of Bostonnais River has a length of 8.2 km (a river of 3.8 km, then a strait of 4.4 km long which is an arm of Grand Lake Bostonnais). Between the two lakes is forestry center called Van Bruyssels.

The mouth of the Grand Lake Bostonnais is located on the west side at the end of a little bay. Bostonnais River cross the lake. The rehabilitation of the dam Grand Lake Bostonnais is a joint project with Ducks Unlimited Canada, the Quebec Wildlife Foundation, Hydro-Québec and Zec Kiskissink for a total cost of $550,000. This project aims to maintain the lake level to promote breeding waterfowl in flooded areas and protection of spawning grounds in the outlet during the winter low flow period. The lake drains in the Bostonnais River.

== Toponymy ==
The name of the lake commemorates Jean-Baptiste Bostonais, a trapper Abenaki originated in Boston, Massachusetts, in New England, who had a hunting territory in the region. His name often comes up in local place names with the Large and Small Bostonnais lakes, the Bostonnais channel, the Little Bostonnais River and Bostonnais island. The river gave its name to the village of La Bostonnais, which with La Tuque is the only community on the banks of this river.

The toponym "Grand Lake Bostonnais" was officially registered on December 5, 1968, at the Bank of place names in Commission de toponymie du Québec (Geographical Names Board of Québec)

== See also ==
- La Tuque (city)
- La Tuque (urban agglomeration)
- Saint-Maurice River
- Bostonnais River
- La Bostonnais (municipality)
- Lake Kiskissink
