= Grand River Bostonnais =

Location
- Country: Canada

Physical characteristics
- Source
  - location: Lake Vesses-de-Loup
  - elevation: 360 m (1,180 ft)
- Mouth
  - location: Batiscan River, Rivière-à-Pierre, Quebec
  - coordinates: 46.99472°N 72.27361°W
  - elevation: 160 m (520 ft)

Basin features
- River system: St. Lawrence River

The Grand River Bostonnais flows in the municipality of Rivière-à-Pierre, in Portneuf Regional County Municipality, in the administrative region of Capitale-Nationale, in Quebec, in Canada. The surface of the river is frozen from November to April. The surrounding area is mostly mountainous and forested.

== Geography ==
This river of Batiscanie flows south-east in a small valley on about 15.2 kilometres (9.4 mi) in mountainous territory to empty in the Batiscan River, in the municipality of Rivière-à-Pierre. The mouth of the "Grand River Bostonnais (Portneuf)" is 2.8 kilometres (1.7 mi) upstream of the mouth of Rivière-à-Pierre. The "little river Bostonnais" flows eastward at few kilometers on the north side, in parallel of the "Grand River Bostonnais (Portneuf), and also empties in Batiscan River.

From "lake Vesses-de-Loup", at an elevation of about 360 metres (1,180 ft) above sea level, which is the main head of the river, water goes down through nine lakes including: Lepiota, "de la Grande Recoupe" (Great Trimming), Dubord and "lac du Barrage" (Lake of the dam). A river segment is 1.4 kilometres (0.87 mi), between the "lac de la Grande Recoupe" and lake Dubord; 1.4 kilometres (0.87 mi) between "Lac du barrage" and the Batiscan River. The second head of the "Grand River Bostonnais" (Portneuf) is lake Guilbeault; it flows a further 2.5 kilometres (1.6 mi) before emptying into the Grand River Bostonnais. This discharge passes through two small lakes including "Petit lac Guilbeault" (Little Lake Guilbeault).

== Toponymy ==
The name "Bostonnais" means in French "people living in Boston" in the U.S. state of Massachusetts.

The name "Grand River Bostonnais" was officially registered on May 7, 1981, at the bank of place names of Commission de toponymie du Québec (Geographical Names Board of Québec)

== See also ==
- Batiscanie
- Batiscan River
- Rivière-à-Pierre (municipality)
- Portneuf Wildlife Reserve
