= Marais Croche, Missouri =

Unincorporated community in Missouri, U.S.

Coordinates: 38°50′52″N 90°24′05″W

Marais Croche is an unincorporated community in St. Charles County, in the U.S. state of Missouri.

The name of the community derives from the French meaning crooked lake, and originally was applied to a swamp near the original town site.
