= La Tuque, Quebec =

City in north-central Quebec, Canada

La Tuque
- City
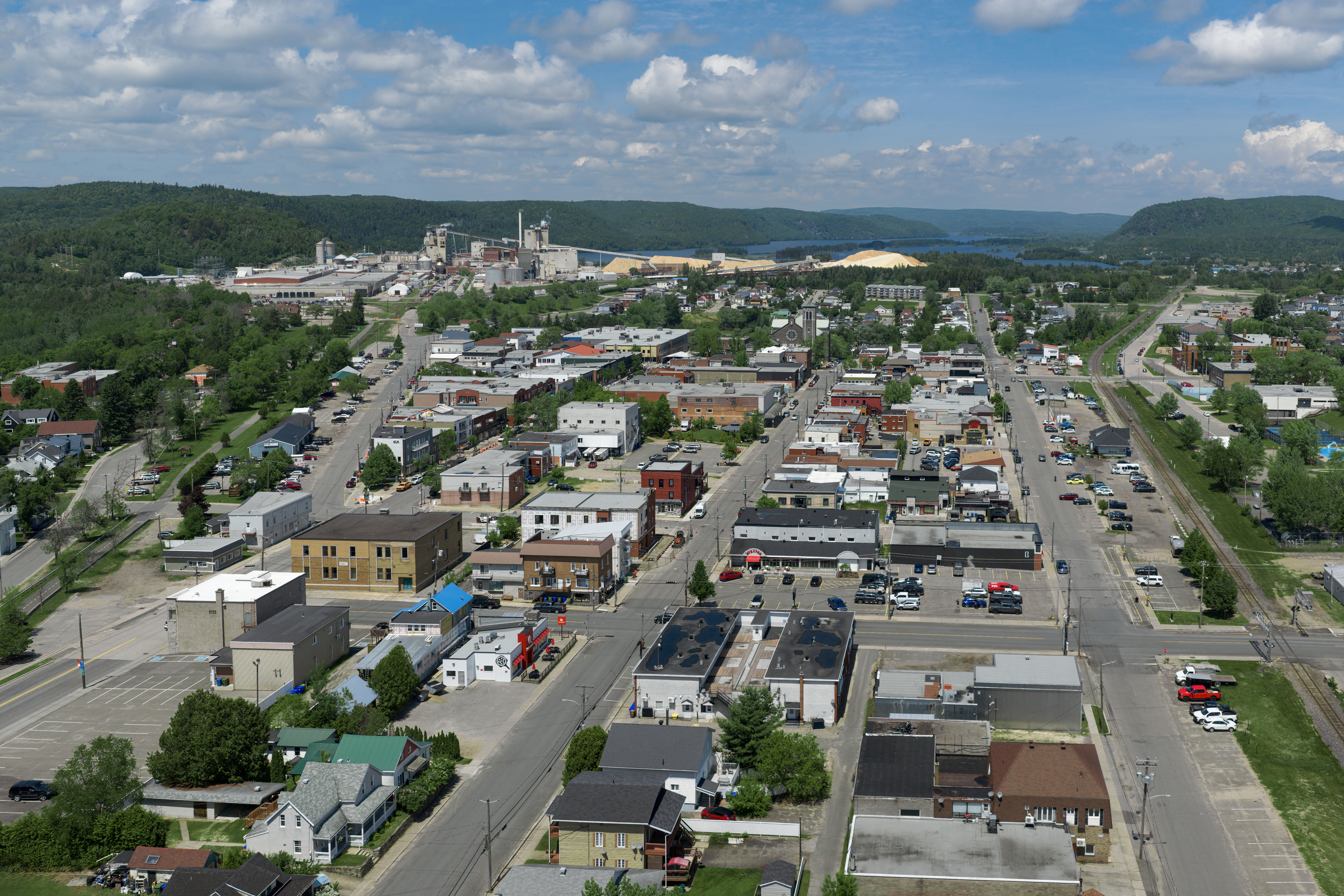
- Downtown (2026)

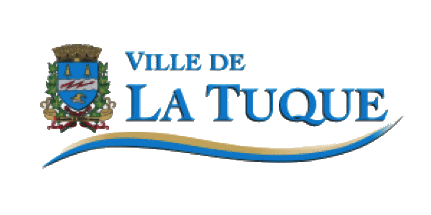
- Flag Coat of arms
- Nickname: Reine de la Haute-Mauricie ("Queen of Haute-Mauricie")
- Motto(s): Industriis et labore cresco (Industry and work to grow)
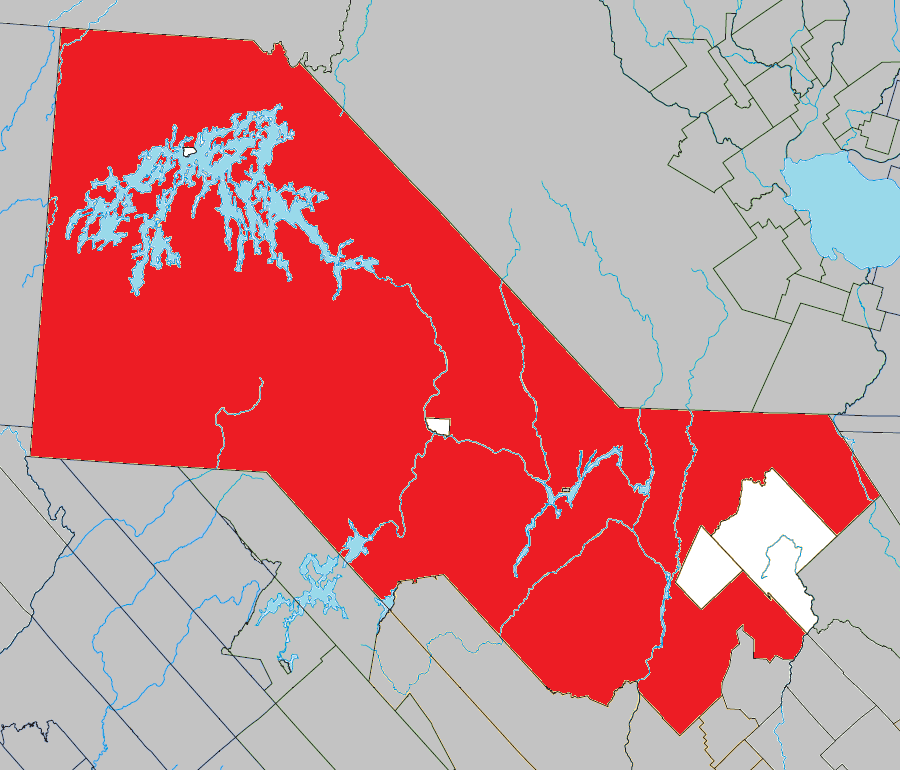
- Location within the former Le Haut-Saint-Maurice RCM

- Location in central Quebec
- Coordinates: 47°26′N 72°47′W
- Country: Canada
- Province: Quebec
- Region: Mauricie
- RCM: None
- Settled: 1850s
- Constituted: March 26, 2003

Government
  - Mayor: Pierre Pacarar
  - Federal riding: Saint-Maurice—Champlain
  - Prov. riding: Laviolette

Area
  - Total: 28,293.71 km^{2} (10,924.26 sq mi)
  - Land: 24,809.40 km^{2} (9,578.96 sq mi)
  - Urban: 6.33 km^{2} (2.44 sq mi)

Population (2021)
  - Total: 11,129
  - Density: 0.4/km^{2} (1.0/sq mi)
  - Urban: 7,464
  - Urban density: 1,179/km^{2} (3,050/sq mi)
  - Pop (2016-21): ▲1.2%
  - Dwellings: 6,930
- Time zone: UTC−5 (EST)
  - Summer (DST): UTC−4 (EDT)
- Postal code(s): G9X
- Area code: 819
- Highways: R-155
- Website: www.ville.latuque.qc.ca

La Tuque (/lɑː ˈtjuːk/ lah TEWK, French: [la tyk], Canadian French: [la t͡sʏk]) is a city located in north-central Quebec, Canada, on the Saint-Maurice River, between Trois-Rivières and Chambord. The population was 11,129 at the 2021 Canadian census, most of which live within the urban area. At over 28,000 square kilometres (11,000 square miles), it is the largest city in Canada by area.

The Classique internationale de canots de la Mauricie canoeing race begins at La Tuque.

The name, which dates to the eighteenth century, originates from a nearby rock formation which resembles a French-Canadian knitted cap known as the tuque.

In 1823–24, the explorer François Verreault described the location as:

« un Portage nommé Ushabatshuan (le courant trop fort pour le sauter). Les Voyageurs le nomment la Tuque, à cause d'une Montagne haute, dont le pic ressemble à une Tuque. Ce portage est d'une lieue, avec des fortes côtes à monter ».
("a portage named Ushabatshuan ('the rapids too strong to jump'). The voyageurs call it La Tuque, due to a tall mountain whose peak resembles a "tuque." The portage is a league long, and climbs steep slopes.")

The hat-shaped mountain which gave its name to the town of La Tuque is located between the Saint-Maurice River (left bank) and the WestRock paper mill. The summit of this mountain is about 245 metres (804 feet). It is located 200 m (660 ft) from the river and about 400 m (1,300 ft) upstream (northeast side) of the La Tuque hydroelectric power plant.

== History ==
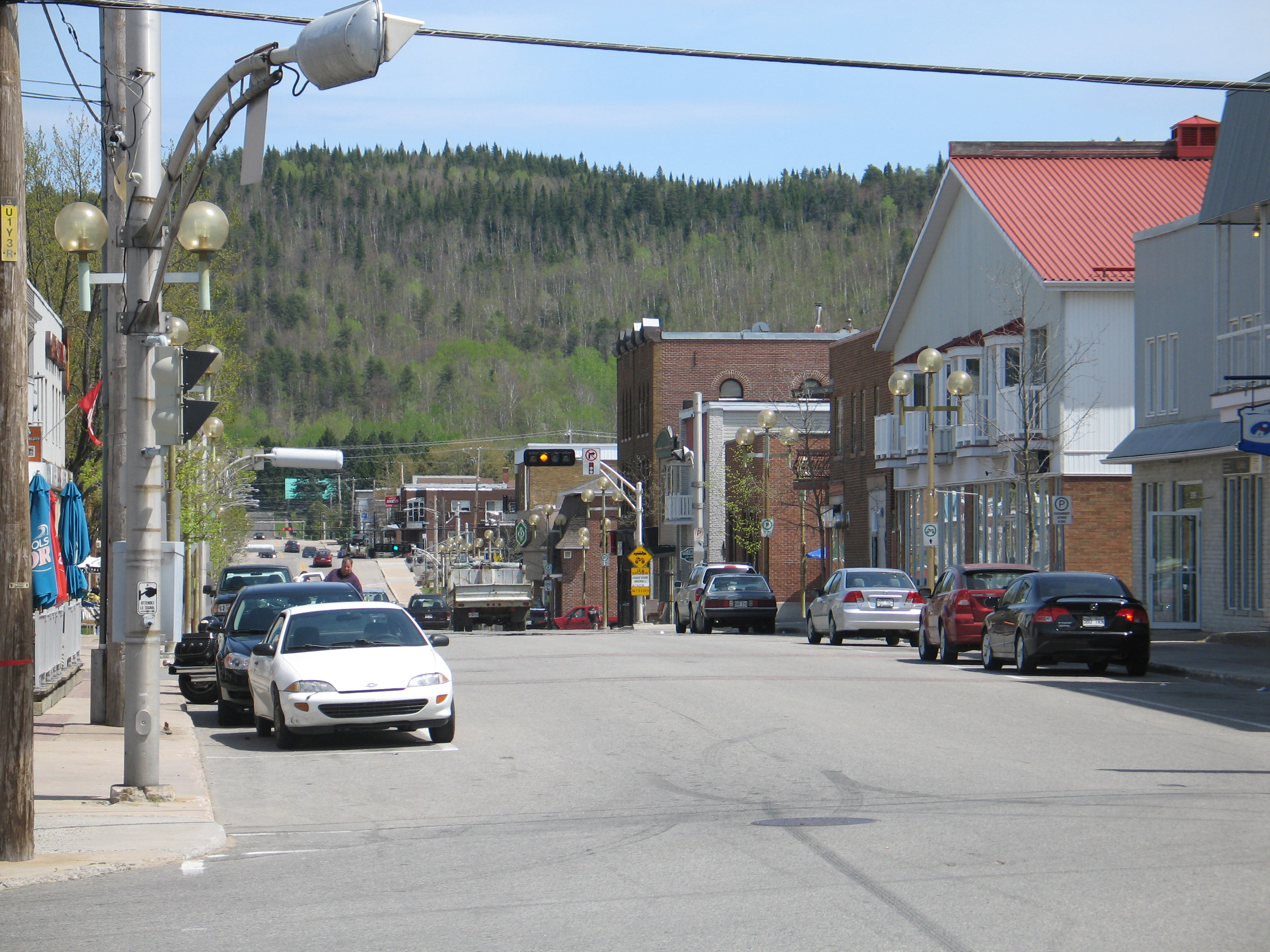
View of a street

The territory of La Tuque was first inhabited by Atikamekw Indigenous people. In the early 1850s, settlers were drawn to the area to exploit the forest resources. The La Tuque Post Office opened in 1887, but the area remained isolated from the rest of the Mauricie until the early 1900s when the National Transcontinental Railway was built, prompting industrial development and the growth of a community on the east bank of the Saint-Maurice River where there was a large set of falls.

On November 15, 1909, the Village Municipality of La Tuque was incorporated, with Achille Comeau as first mayor. A few months later on April 4, 1910, the Village Municipality of La Tuque Falls was formed, with Wenceslas Plante as first mayor. Less than one year later in March 1911, both villages merged to form the Town of La Tuque, with Wenceslas Plante as first mayor.

In the 1940s, the hydro-electric generating station on the Saint-Maurice River was built, resulting in the partial destruction of the rock formation that gave the town its name.

In 1972, the Municipality of Haute-Mauricie was formed out of portions from the unincorporated Carignan and Malhiot Townships, in the proximity of the Saint-Maurice Wildlife Reserve. However, its low population and constantly rising administrative costs led to the merger of Haute-Mauricie with La Tuque in August 1993.

On March 26, 2003, Le Haut-Saint-Maurice Regional County Municipality was dissolved and all its municipalities and unorganized territories were amalgamated into the new City of La Tuque, thereby becoming the largest municipality with city status in land area in Quebec, and largest in Canada (38,000 km^{2}). On January 1, 2006, the municipalities of La Bostonnais and Lac-Édouard separated and were reestablished.

In May 2010, some 120 forest fires broke out around La Tuque, burning until June. Smoke from these fires reached portions of Eastern Ontario and southern Quebec, including the cities of Ottawa and Montreal, as well as the northern US states.

In 2011, the 100th anniversary of La Tuque was celebrated with various cultural activities, including a large parade held on June 25 as well as the creation of a recipe book made by local residents.

== Geography ==
While the urban area of La Tuque is relatively small, its entire territory is the largest city in Canada. It consists of almost all the entire former regional county municipality of Le Haut-Saint-Maurice, and includes the settlements of Carignan, Clova, La Croche, Fitzpatrick, Kiskissink, Oskélanéo, Parent, Rapide-Blanc, Rivière-aux-Rats, and Sanmaur.

Enclosed by but not administratively part of the city are the three First Nations reserves of Coucoucache, Obedjiwan, and Wemotaci.

Notable bodies of water in La Tuque are:

- Gouin Reservoir
- Lake Edouard
- Lake Kiskissink
- Lake Wayagamac
- Grand Lake Bostonnais
- Ventadour Lake

Notable rivers in La Tuque are:

- Saint-Maurice
- Vermillon
- Manouane
- Croche
- Bostonnais
- Little Bostonnais
- Trenche

=== Climate ===
La Tuque has a humid continental climate (Köppen Dfb) with warm summers and cold, snowy winters.

Climate data for La Tuque, Quebec (1981–2010 normals)
| Month | Jan | Feb | Mar | Apr | May | Jun | Jul | Aug | Sep | Oct | Nov | Dec | Year |
|---|---|---|---|---|---|---|---|---|---|---|---|---|---|
| Record high °C (°F) | 12.2 (54.0) | 12.0 (53.6) | 21.1 (70.0) | 32.0 (89.6) | 35.0 (95.0) | 38.0 (100.4) | 37.2 (99.0) | 40.0 (104.0) | 33.3 (91.9) | 29.4 (84.9) | 21.1 (70.0) | 12.0 (53.6) | 40.0 (104.0) |
| Mean daily maximum °C (°F) | −8.5 (16.7) | −5.1 (22.8) | 1.3 (34.3) | 9.3 (48.7) | 18.2 (64.8) | 23.3 (73.9) | 25.3 (77.5) | 23.9 (75.0) | 17.9 (64.2) | 10.9 (51.6) | 2.3 (36.1) | −4.8 (23.4) | 9.5 (49.1) |
| Daily mean °C (°F) | −14.8 (5.4) | −12.0 (10.4) | −5.2 (22.6) | 3.4 (38.1) | 11.1 (52.0) | 16.4 (61.5) | 18.8 (65.8) | 17.6 (63.7) | 12.3 (54.1) | 6.0 (42.8) | −1.7 (28.9) | −9.8 (14.4) | 3.5 (38.3) |
| Mean daily minimum °C (°F) | −21.0 (−5.8) | −18.8 (−1.8) | −11.7 (10.9) | −2.6 (27.3) | 4.0 (39.2) | 9.4 (48.9) | 12.2 (54.0) | 11.3 (52.3) | 6.6 (43.9) | 1.1 (34.0) | −5.6 (21.9) | −14.8 (5.4) | −2.5 (27.5) |
| Record low °C (°F) | −44.4 (−47.9) | −42.8 (−45.0) | −40.0 (−40.0) | −24.4 (−11.9) | −9.4 (15.1) | −2.8 (27.0) | 0.0 (32.0) | −0.5 (31.1) | −7.0 (19.4) | −14.4 (6.1) | −26.7 (−16.1) | −42.8 (−45.0) | −44.4 (−47.9) |
| Average precipitation mm (inches) | 57.8 (2.28) | 46.5 (1.83) | 54.8 (2.16) | 54.9 (2.16) | 84.4 (3.32) | 93.5 (3.68) | 129.9 (5.11) | 93.7 (3.69) | 94.9 (3.74) | 82.1 (3.23) | 73.6 (2.90) | 52.9 (2.08) | 919 (36.18) |
| Average rainfall mm (inches) | 7.3 (0.29) | 10.1 (0.40) | 28.0 (1.10) | 49.2 (1.94) | 84.3 (3.32) | 93.5 (3.68) | 129.9 (5.11) | 93.7 (3.69) | 94.9 (3.74) | 80.4 (3.17) | 52.0 (2.05) | 9.5 (0.37) | 732.8 (28.86) |
| Average snowfall cm (inches) | 50.5 (19.9) | 36.4 (14.3) | 26.8 (10.6) | 5.8 (2.3) | 0.1 (0.0) | 0 (0) | 0 (0) | 0 (0) | 0 (0) | 1.7 (0.7) | 21.6 (8.5) | 43.4 (17.1) | 186.3 (73.4) |
| Average precipitation days (≥ 0.2 mm) | 13.3 | 10.5 | 10.6 | 10.8 | 12.5 | 14.0 | 14.8 | 14.5 | 15.3 | 14.2 | 13.0 | 13.8 | 157.3 |
| Average rainy days (≥ 0.2 mm) | 1.3 | 1.3 | 4.6 | 9.8 | 13.5 | 14.1 | 15.4 | 14.9 | 16.2 | 14.5 | 8.4 | 2.1 | 116.1 |
| Average snowy days (≥ 0.2 cm) | 12.3 | 9.9 | 6.9 | 2.3 | 0.1 | 0 | 0 | 0 | 0 | 0.6 | 6.1 | 12.5 | 50.7 |
Source: Environment Canada

== Demographics ==
In the 2021 Census of Population conducted by Statistics Canada, La Tuque had a population of 11,129 living in 5,543 of its 6,930 total private dwellings, a change of 1.2% from its 2016 population of 11,001. With a land area of 24,809.4 km^{2} (9,579.0 sq mi), it had a population density of 0.4/km^{2} (1.2/sq mi) in 2021.

Canada census – La Tuque community profile

| | 2021 | 2016 | 2011 |
| Population | 11,129 (+1.2% from 2016) | 11,001 (-2.0% from 2011) | 11,227 (-5.0% from 2006) |
| Land area | 24,809.40 km^{2} (9,578.96 sq mi) | 25,112.41 km^{2} (9,695.96 sq mi) | 25,113.70 km^{2} (9,696.45 sq mi) |
| Population density | 0.4/km^{2} (1.0/sq mi) | 0.4/km^{2} (1.0/sq mi) | 0.4/km^{2} (1.0/sq mi) |
| Median age | 51.6 (M: 50.8, F: 52.4) | 51.1 (M: 50.3, F: 51.7) | 48.6 (M: 47.9, F: 49.2) |
| Private dwellings | 6,930 (total) 5,543 (occupied) | 6,919 (total) | 7,373 (total) |
| Median household income | $59,600 | $51,014 | $45,874 |

References: 2021 2016 2011

Historical Census Data - La Tuque, Quebec

| Year | Pop. | ±% |
|---|---|---|
| 1921 | 5,603 | — |
| 1931 | 7,871 | +40.5% |
| 1941 | 7,919 | +0.6% |
| 1951 | 9,538 | +20.4% |
| 1956 | 11,096 | +16.3% |
| 1961 | 13,023 | +17.4% |
| 1966 | 13,554 | +4.1% |
| 1971 | 13,099 | −3.4% |
| 1976 | 12,067 | −7.9% |

| Year | Pop. | ±% |
|---|---|---|
| 1981 | 11,556 | −4.2% |
| 1986 | 10,723 | −7.2% |
| 1991 | 12,557 | +17.1% |
| 1996 | 12,102 | −3.6% |
| 2001 | 11,298 | −6.6% |
| 2006 | 11,821 | +4.6% |
| 2011 | 11,227 | −5.0% |
| 2016 | 11,001 | −2.0% |
| 2021 | 11,129 | +1.2% |

Population amounts prior to 1993 are total of La Tuque V and Haute-Mauricie SD. (A) adjustment due to boundary change.
Source: Statistics Canada

Canada Census Mother Tongue - La Tuque, Quebec
| Census | Total | French | | | English | | | French & English | | | Other | | |
| Year | Responses | Count | Trend | Pop % | Count | Trend | Pop % | Count | Trend | Pop % | Count | Trend | Pop % |
| 2021 | 11,040 | 10,260 | ▲1.3% | 92.9% | 155 | ▼13.9% | 1.4% | 95 | ▲35.7% | 0.9% | 430 | ▲2.4% | 3.9% |
| 2016 | 10,830 | 10,125 | ▼3.2% | 93.5% | 180 | 0.0% | 1.7% | 70 | ▲40.0% | 0.6% | 420 | ▲29.2% | 3.9% |
| 2011 | 11,010 | 10,455 | ▼5.6% | 95.0% | 180 | ▼5.3% | 1.6% | 50 | ▲150.0% | 0.5% | 325 | ▲8.3% | 3.0% |
| 2006 | 11,590 | 11,080 | ▲3.6% | 95.6% | 190 | ▲5.5% | 1.6% | 20 | ▼66.7% | 0.2% | 300 | ▲33.3% | 2.6% |
| 2001 | 11,160 | 10,695 | ▼6.2% | 95.8% | 180 | ▼53.8% | 1.6% | 60 | ▲100.0% | 0.5% | 225 | ▲60.7% | 2.0% |
| 1996 | 11,965 | 11,405 | n/a | 95.3% | 390 | n/a | 3.3% | 30 | n/a | 0.3% | 140 | n/a | 1.2% |

=== Territorial equivalent ===
Historical Census Data - La Tuque TE, Quebec
| Year | Pop. | ±% |
|---|---|---|
| 2003E | 15,862 | — |
| 2006 | 15,448 | −2.6% |
| 2011 | 15,130 | −2.1% |
| 2016 | 15,059 | −0.5% |
| 2021 | 15,038 | −0.1% |
(E) established on March 26, 2003. Source: Statistics Canada

The population of the La Tuque territorial equivalent according to the Canada 2021 Census is 15,038.

Canada census – La Tuque TE, Quebec community profile

| | 2021 | 2016 | 2011 |
| Population | 15,038 (-0.1% from 2016) | 15,059 (-0.5% from 2011) | 15,130 (-2.1% from 2006) |
| Land area | 26,031.84 km^{2} (10,050.95 sq mi) | 26,356.13 km^{2} (10,176.16 sq mi) | 26,356.98 km^{2} (10,176.49 sq mi) |
| Population density | 0.6/km^{2} (1.6/sq mi) | 0.6/km^{2} (1.6/sq mi) | 0.6/km^{2} (1.6/sq mi) |
| Median age | 45.2 (M: 44.8, F: 45.6) | 44.6 (M: 43.6, F: 45.9) | 43.2 (M: 41.9, F: 44.4) |
| Private dwellings | 8,394 (total) | 8,360 (total) | 9,040 (total) |
| Median household income | $61,600 | $51,384 | $45,484 |

References: 2021 2016 2011

== Economy ==
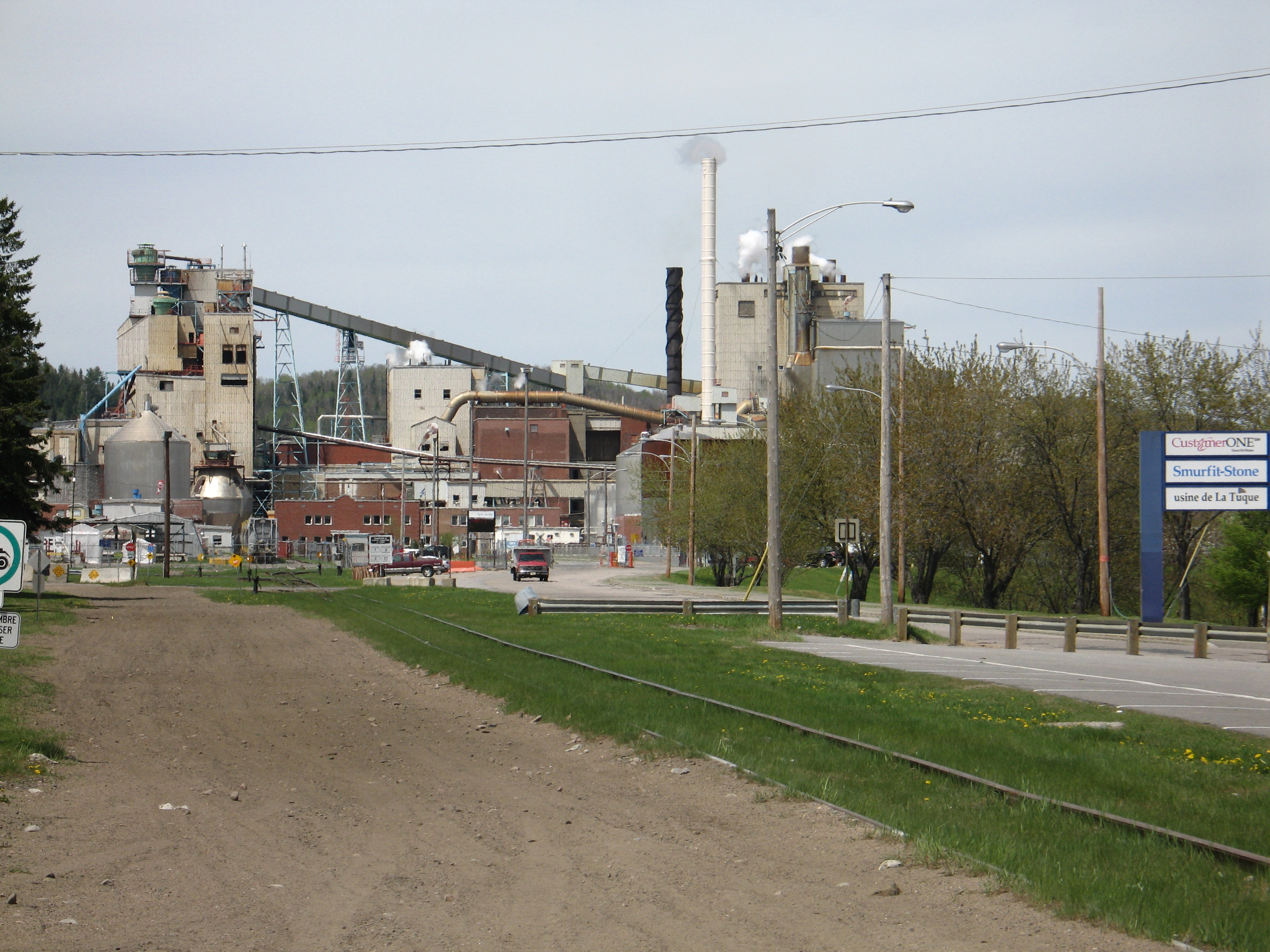
The paper mill in La Tuque

The local economy centres on pulp and paper; the city has a pulp-milling centre as well as a major hydroelectric station.

As the gateway to the upper Mauricie, La Tuque's economy also offers outdoor tourism opportunities and caters to hunting and fishing trips in its large hinterland, which is partially regulated by the following zone d'exploitation contrôlées:

- Zec de la Croche
- Zec de la Bessonne
- Zec Borgia
- Zec Frémont
- Zec du Gros-Brochet
- Zec Jeannotte, Québec
- Zec Kiskissink
- Zec Menokeosawin
- Zec Tawachiche
- Zec Wessonneau

== Government ==
=== Urban agglomeration ===

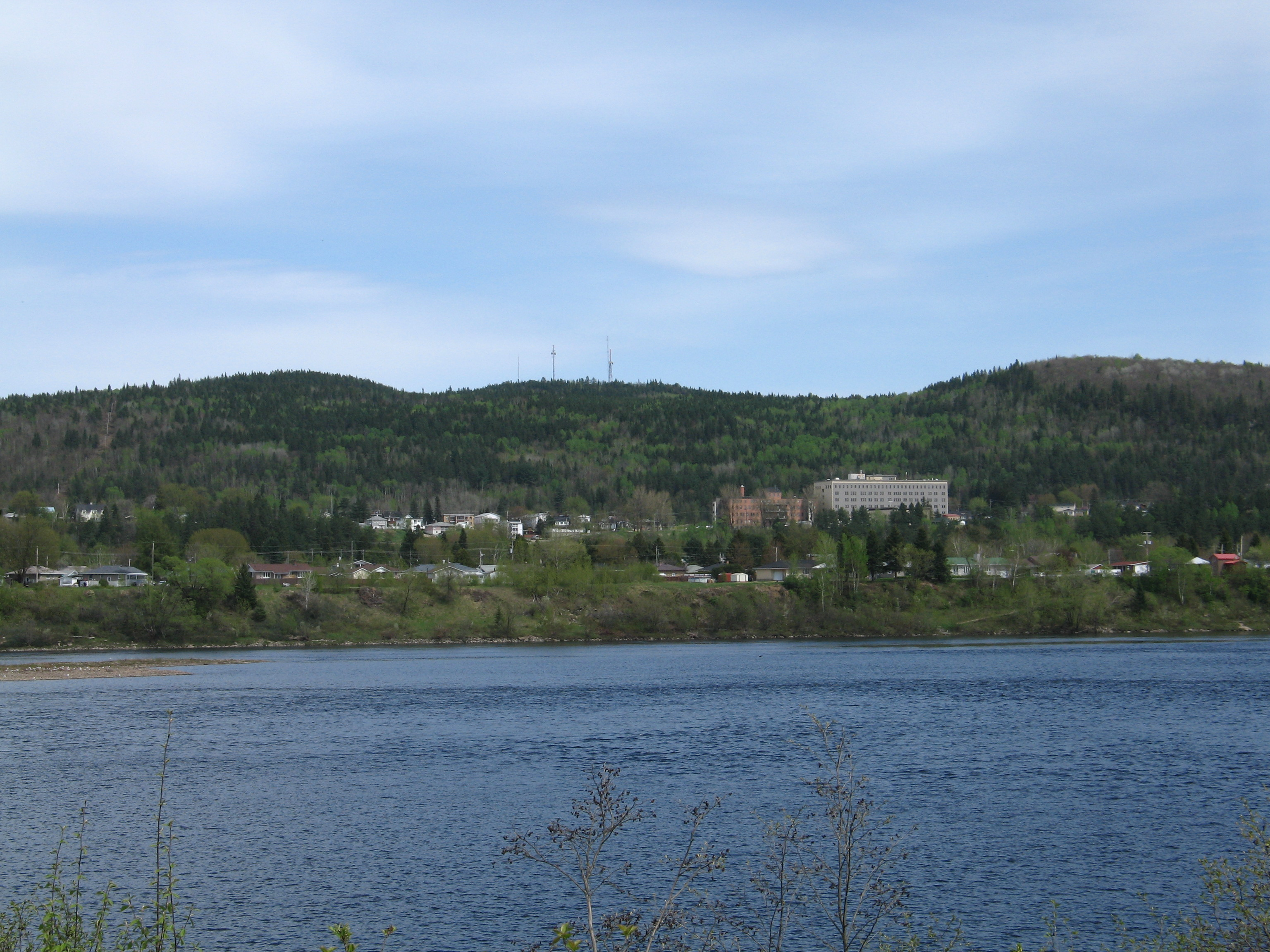
Urban area of La Tuque City seen from west shore of Saint-Maurice River

The Urban agglomeration of La Tuque is an urban agglomeration that consists of:

- the city of La Tuque,
- the municipality of La Bostonnais,
- the municipality of Lac-Édouard.

The agglomeration comprises the elements of the redefined city of La Tuque as it existed after amalgamation on March 26, 2003, including the two municipalities that chose to de-merge on January 1, 2006.

The agglomeration of La Tuque succeeded to the regional county municipality of Haut-Saint-Maurice, which was created in 1982 from part of the Quebec ridings's (county's) of Champlain electoral district, of Quebec electoral district of Saint-Maurice and of Abitibi. Le Haut-Saint-Maurice was dissolved during the merger of all municipalities in 2003 to create the city of La Tuque. Following the referendum on recreating La Bostonnais and Lac-Édouard, the agglomeration of La Tuque was created to allow municipalities to manage in common some competencies.

=== Census division ===
La Tuque is a territory equivalent to a regional county municipality (TE) and census division of Quebec, with geographical code 90. The TE of La Tuque consists of:

- the municipalities of the urban agglomeration of La Tuque, namely

- the city of La Tuque
- the municipality of La Bostonnais
- the municipality of Lac-Édouard

- three Indian reserves, namely

- Coucoucache
- Wemotaci
- Obedjiwan

=== List of mayors ===
The mayor is the municipality's highest elected official. La Tuque has had fifteen mayors, since its incorporation as a city.

| # | Mayor | Taking office | Leaving |
|---|---|---|---|
| 1 | Wenceslas Plante | 1911 | 1915 |
| 2 | Alphondor Roy | 1915 | 1920 |
| 3 | Donat E. Hardy | 1920 | 1921 |
| 4 | Wellie Juneau | 1921 | 1921 |
| 5 | Réal Gravel | 1921 | 1923 |
| 1 | Wenceslas Plante | 1923 | 1927 |
| 6 | François-Xavier Lamontagne | 1927 | 1935 |
| 7 | Joseph-Omer Journeault | 1935 | 1944 |
| 8 | Omer Veillette | 1944 | 1947 |
| 7 | Joseph-Omer Journeault | 1947 | 1951 |
| 9 | Léo-Joffre Pilon | 1951 | 1955 |
| 10 | J.-Onésime Dallaire | 1955 | 1961 |
| 11 | Lucien Filion | 1961 | 1985 |
| 12 | Clément Filion | 1985 | 1985 |
| 13 | André Duchesneau | 1985 | 1991 |
| 14 | Gaston Fortin | 1991 | 2003 |
| 15 | Réjean Gaudreault | 2003 | 2009 |
| 16 | Normand Beaudoin | 2009 | 2017 |
| 17 | Pierre-David Tremblay | 2017 | 2021 |
| 19 | Luc Martel | 2021 | 2025 |
| 20 | Pierre Pacarar | 2025 | |

== Infrastructure ==
The main highway is Quebec Route 155 that connects La Tuque with Shawinigan to the south and the Saguenay–Lac-Saint-Jean region to the north. Numerous forest roads provide access to remote hunting and fishing camps. The village of Parent is accessible from the east by a 180 kilometres (110 mi) long gravel road from La Tuque and from the west by a 178 kilometres (111 mi) long gravel road from Mont-Saint-Michel in the Laurentides.

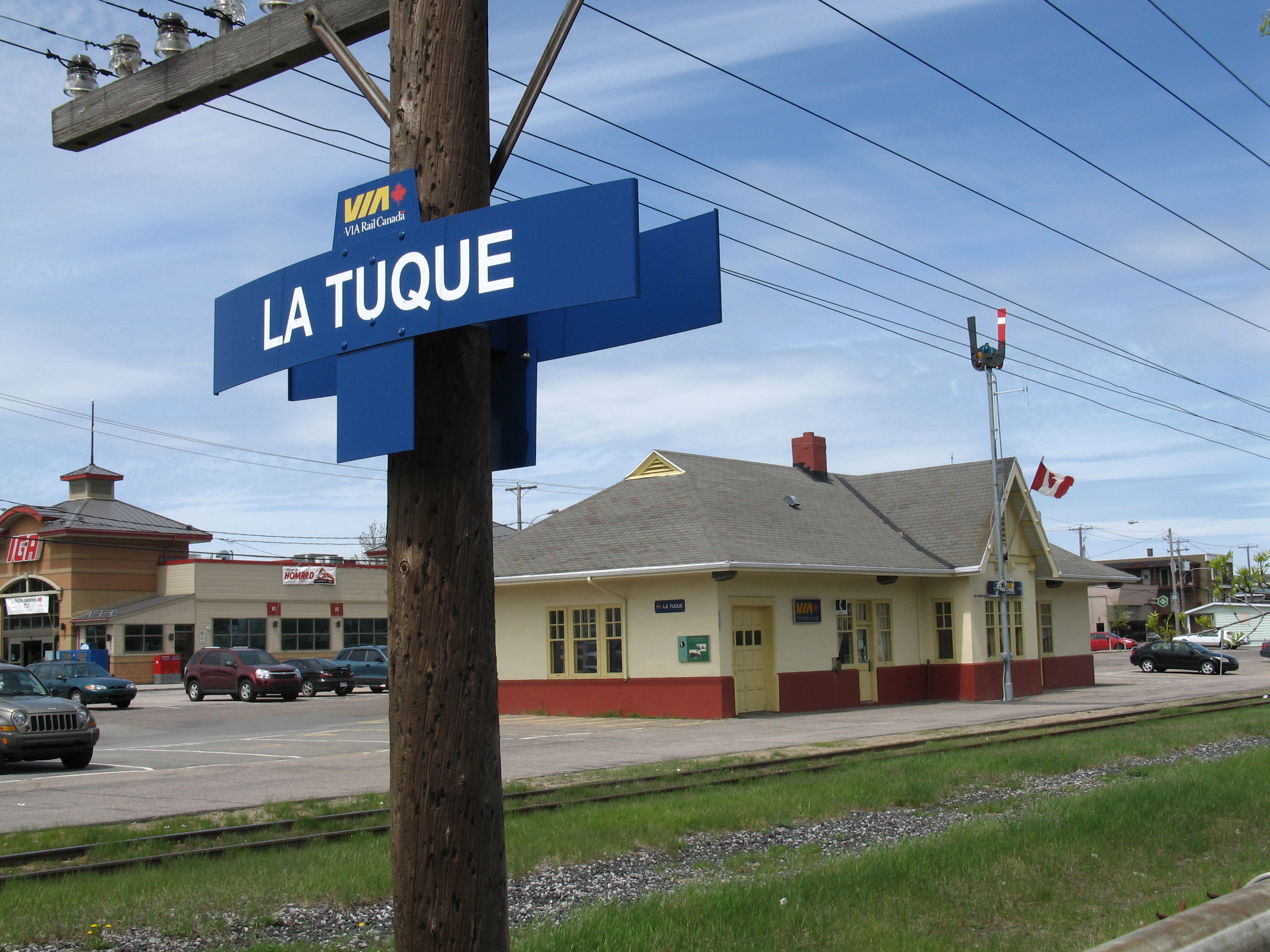
La Tuque Railway Station

The Canadian National Railway dissects La Tuque's territory. This railway, built in 1910 by the National Transcontinental Railway, connected Quebec City to the Canadian Prairies and goes through vast wilderness areas of northern Quebec and Ontario. While it was intended to ship grain from the prairies to the Port of Quebec and to open up virgin territories, it never carried much rail traffic. However, it is still serviced by Via Rail at the La Tuque railway station and Parent railway station, with request stops at Fitzpatrick, Oskélanéo, and Clova. Other sidings along the line are Casey, Hibbard, Cann, Sanmaur, Vandry, Windigo, and Rapide-Blanc-Station.

The La Tuque Airport is located directly south of the town's centre on Ducharme boulevard. La Tuque Water Aerodrome is located just north of the city centre.

== Notable people ==
- Mathieu Fortin, writer
- Maude Guérin, actress
- Félix Leclerc (1914–1988), singer-songwriter, poet, writer, actor and Québécois political activist
- Sylvie Roy, politician
- James Renald, musician
- Gaétan Barrette, politician
- Steven Guilbeault, politician

== See also ==
- La Tuque Water Aerodrome
- 21st-century municipal history of Quebec
- Municipal reorganization in Quebec
