= Croche River (La Tuque) =

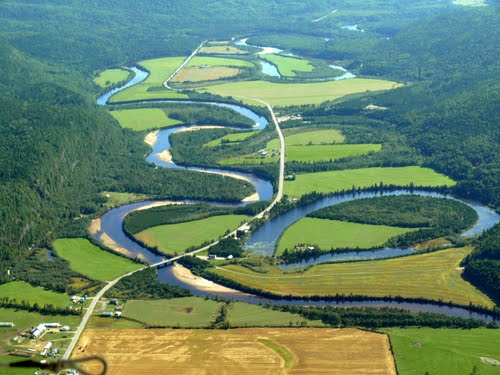
- Rivière Croche

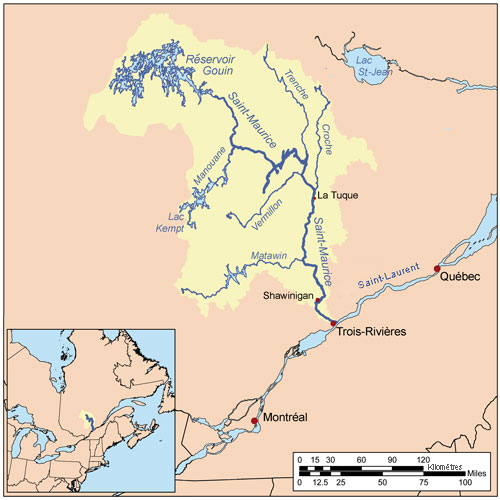
- "Rivière Croche" (Croche River) is very serpentine in some segments.
- Native name: Rivière Croche (French)

Location
- Country: Canada
- Province: Quebec
- Region: Saguenay-Lac-Saint-Jean and Mauricie
- Regional County Municipality: Le Domaine-du-Roy Regional County Municipality and La Tuque

Physical characteristics
- Source: Lac du Caribou
  - location: Lac-Ashuapmushuan
  - coordinates: 48°24′18″N 72°43′44″W
  - elevation: 435 m (1,427 ft)
- Mouth: Saint-Maurice River
  - location: Canton de Malhiot in La Tuque (hamlet Rivière-Croche)
  - coordinates: 47°29′40″N 72°46′29″W
  - elevation: 151 m (495 ft)
- Length: 160.7 km (99.9 mi)
- Basin size: Saint-Maurice River
- Discharge
  - location: La Tuque

Basin features
- River system: St. Lawrence River
- Tributaries
  - left: (Upward from the mouth) ruisseau non identifié, ruisseau non identifié, ruisseau du Moulin, ruisseau du Rocher, ruisseau Bourgeoys, ruisseau Bourque, ruisseau Freezer, ruisseau du Huard, décharge du lac Alouette, deux ruisseaux non identifiés, ruisseau Shaw, ruisseau Côté, Petite rivière Croche, décharge d'un lac non identifié, décharge d'un lac non identifié, décharge du lac Batelet, rivière Brûlée (rivière Croche), décharge d'un lac non identifié, décharge de deux lacs non identifiés, rivière Patrick, ruisseau Moose, décharge du lac Luc, décharge du lac au Foin et Rodrigue, décharge des lacs Charley et de la Chute, décharge du Grand lac Côté, décharge du lac Chicoutimi et du lac du Rat-Musqué, ruisseau Paul, ruisseau de l'Ours, ruisseau Panache, décharge du Lac Philippe, ruisseau de la Moëlle, décharge du lac de la Cache, décharge du lac Touladi et du Grand lac Bonhomme.
  - right: (Upward from the mouth) décharge d'un ruisseau non identifié, décharge de deux petits lacs non identifiés, ruisseau non identifié, ruisseau non identifié, décharge de deux petits lacs non identifiés, décharge des lacs Voisin, La Loutre, Duplessis et Filion, décharge d'un petit lac non identifié, ruisseau Clair (décharge du lac Clair), décharge du Lac du Chevreuil, décharge d'un petit lac non identifié, décharge d'un petit lac non identifié, décharge du Lac de la Vase, ruisseau Kennedy (décharge du lac Kennedy), ruisseau non identifié, décharge du lac Dimo, ruisseau en Coeur, ruisseau non identifié, ruisseau non identifié, ruisseau Slide, décharge des lacs du Canal, Blais et Gaudelet, six ruisseaux non identifiés, ruisseau Savane, décharge d'un petit lac non identifié, décharge d'un lac non identifié, deux ruisseaux non identifiés, décharge du Lac Michy, ruisseau non identifié, décharge d'un lac non identifié, ruisseau non identifié, de deux petits lacs non identifiés, décharge (via le lac Davenne) d'un petit lac non identifié, décharge du Lac du Bec-Scie, ruisseau non identifié, décharge du Lac L'Épiote et du lac des Deux-Montagnes, décharge du Petit lac des Mousses, ruisseau aux Goélands (décharge du lac en Arrière et du Lac aux Goélands), ruisseau non identifié, ruisseau du Couteau, ruisseau Frog, décharge du Lac des Frères, décharge du lac Arthur, ruisseau du Jeune Bois, décharge du lac du Jobber, décharge du Lac Edward, décharge du Lac Travers.

The Croche River is a tributary of Saint-Maurice River, and flows in the regions of Haute-Mauricie and Saguenay-Lac-Saint-Jean, in the province of Quebec, Canada. The Croche River crosses the following cantons of Chabanel and Bécard, in Lac-Ashuapmushuan (unorganized territory), in the MRC Le Domaine-du-Roy Regional County Municipality, in the administrative region of Saguenay–Lac-Saint-Jean and the cantons of Michaux, Lavoie, Langelier and Malhiot, in the territory of La Tuque, in Mauricie.

Croche River is one of the five largest tributaries of the Saint-Maurice River.

== Geography ==
The Croche River rises at the mouth of Caribou Lake (length: 3.0 kilometres (1.9 mi) in the North-South axis; altitude: 439 metres (1,440 ft)). This source is located 7.5 kilometres (4.7 mi) northeast of the course of the Raimbault River; 36.5 kilometres (22.7 mi) south-west of the south shore of lac Saint-Jean; 22.2 kilometres (13.8 mi) south-west of the village center of Sainte-Hedwidge; and 33.7 kilometres (20.9 mi) west of lac des Commissaires.

Its source is 100 kilometres (62 mi) north of La Tuque and it flows south through a narrow valley forming interconnecting lakes and many bends, which characterize its name. Many small rivers feed the northern half of the river's course. For many segments of its path, the river flows through many rapids, waterfalls and cascades.

From The mouth of Lac du Caribou", located on the north side of the lake, the Croche river flows over 160.7 kilometres (99.9 mi), with a drop of 284 metres (932 ft), according to the following segments:

=== Upper course ===
(segment of 36.3 kilometres (22.6 mi))

- 0.5 kilometres (0.31 mi) northwards, to the south shore of Caribou lake (length: 1.5 kilometres (0.93 mi); altitude: 435 metres (1,427 ft));
- 0.6 kilometres (0.37 mi) to the east, crossing Caribou lake, to the dam located at the mouth;
- 3.5 kilometres (2.2 mi) to the East, forming a curve towards the South to collect the water from the outlet (coming from the South) of Lac Travers, to the outlet (coming from the North) of the Lake Lake trout and Grand lac Bonhomme;
- 2.5 kilometres (1.6 mi) towards the South-East by crossing a marsh area, to the mouth of Lac aux Rats (length: 3.0 kilometres (1.9 mi); altitude: 430 metres (1,410 ft)) that the current crosses on 0.3 kilometres (0.19 mi) towards the South;
- 4.3 kilometres (2.7 mi) south-east, up to the bridge of a forest road;
- 10.2 kilometres (6.3 mi) south-east, to the mouth of Lac du Cygne (length: 0.7 kilometres (0.43 mi); altitude: 413 metres (1,355 ft)) that the current crosses over its full length;
- 8.1 kilometres (5.0 mi) south-east, to the northwest shore of Lac Panache (length: 7.8 kilometres (4.8 mi); altitude: 354 metres (1,161 ft));
- 6.6 kilometres (4.1 mi) to the Southwest, crossing Lac Panache to its mouth.

=== Intermediate course ===
(segment of 33.1 kilometres (20.6 mi))

From the mouth of Lac Panache, the Croche river flows on:

- 2.1 kilometres (1.3 mi) south-west, to the mouth of Lac au Ruisseau (length: 0.7 kilometres (0.43 mi); elevation: 344 metres (1,129 ft) ) that the current crosses over its full length;
- 11.6 kilometres (7.2 mi) towards the southwest by collecting the waters of the Goélands stream (coming from the west), up to the limit of the canton of Bécart;
- 7.1 kilometres (4.4 mi) southwards, to the mouth of Lac Davenne (length: 4.0 kilometres (2.5 mi); elevation: 329 metres (1,079 ft)) that the current crosses over its full length;
- 3.6 kilometres (2.2 mi) towards the south, with several falls and rapids, until the confluence of the Patrick River (coming from the northeast);
- 6.4 kilometres (4.0 mi) towards the south, by forming a hook towards the west, up to the limit of La Tuque;
- 2.3 kilometres (1.4 mi) towards the southeast in La Tuque, until the confluence of the Rivière du Brûlé (Croche River) (coming from the northeast);

=== Lower course ===
(segment of 91.3 kilometres (56.7 mi))

From the confluence of the rivière du Brûlé, the Croche river flows on:

- 2.3 kilometres (1.4 mi) southwards, to a bridge over a forest road;
- 14.3 kilometres (8.9 mi) (or 7.4 kilometres (4.6 mi) in a direct line) towards the South-East by crossing the rapids of the Grosse Roche and the Brûlé falls, and meandering until the confluence of the Petite rivière Croche (coming from the East);
- 1.3 kilometres (0.81 mi) towards the South by forming a curve towards the North-East, up to the limit of the canton of Lavoie;
- 25.9 kilometres (16.1 mi) (or 13.0 kilometres (8.1 mi) in a direct line) to the South, winding up to a bridge over a forest road;
- 8.0 kilometres (5.0 mi) (or 4.7 kilometres (2.9 mi) in a direct line) to the South, winding up to the limit of the canton of Langelier;
- 23.7 kilometres (14.7 mi) (or 15.5 kilometres (9.6 mi) in a direct line) to the South, winding up to a road bridge;
- 13.8 kilometres (8.6 mi) (or 7.5 kilometres (4.7 mi) in a direct line) to the South, passing under two bridges and winding up to the limit of the canton of Malhiot;
- 2.0 kilometres (1.2 mi) towards the South, forming the limit between the canton of Langelier and Malhiot, and passing under the railway bridge, until the confluence of the river.

The Croche river flows in a narrow valley generally in a south direction, forming lakes in succession and numerous meander s in the lower part, which characterize its appellation. Many small streams feed the northern half of its route. For several segments of its route, this river flows through numerous rapids, falls and waterfalls.

On its last 20 kilometres (12 mi), the river forms a valley rich in alluvium in agricultural zone, before entering the Saint-Maurice River at 5 kilometres (3.1 mi) north of La Tuque.

== History ==
Formerly a deciduous forest dominated vegetation in the downstream part of the watershed of the Croche river, because the soil was rich in alluvium. In the late 19th and early 20th centuries, the watershed of the river was cleared to make way for agriculture. Several farms were established. Despite its shallow depth, the river was used to float logs to feed sawmills and pulp mills located in the La Tuque and downstream on the Saint-Maurice River.

Probably built initially by the Halls (Bébé Tessier), the "ferme de la Croche" (La Croche Farm) was acquired successively by several forestry companies, in particular the one owned by Alex Baptist. Bishop Caron, a great explorer of Haute-Mauricie in the 20th century, suggests in his 1887 travel report that this farm was rented in 1887 to the Halls. Around 1890, this farm would probably have been abandoned and passed for haunted.

== Toponymy ==
The name «Croche River» was formalized on December 5, 1968, at the Bank of place names of Commission de toponymie du Québec (Geographical Names Board of Québec).

According to the Commission de toponymie du Québec (Geographical Names Board of Québec) in 1863, Stanislas Drapeau mentioned in his notes the name of "rivière Croche" (Croche River). The land surveyor Du Tremblay described it as well in 1873. In popular language, the term "Croche" often refers to a serpentine path makes a hook or streamers. The toponyms "Croche" and Crooked is widespread in the places names in Quebec, including 102 lakes that are so designated. Given that many rivers used the word «Croche» in their names, the authorities replaced some of them with more distinctive names. The number of 145, these ancient lakes Croche or Crooked particular received or sometimes taken other specific descriptive French terms (Crochet, "Crochu" (Hooked), "Sinueux" (Curvy), "Coudé" (Bent), etc.). Surnames and forenames (Gabriel Forster, Laflamme, Daniel, Colette, etc..) or Native American names (Manitou, Wapizagonke, Kiwatin, Causapscal, etc.).

In addition, the Bank of place names of Quebec includes five "Croche rivers", a small Croche river and a small North Croche, as well as "rivière crochue" (Croche River). Seven "Croche Rivers" or "Crooked rivers" received or taken other names such as "Lecompte river", Auriac river, "du Gouffre Sud-Ouest" and Camitogama. The "Croche" term is present in the names of three populated places in Quebec: Lac-Croche, Quebec in Matawinie, La Croche, "Rivière Croche" (Croche River) in Mauricie.

== See also ==
- Le Domaine-du-Roy Regional County Municipality
- La Tuque (urban agglomeration)
- La Tuque, une ville
- Lac-Ashuapmushuan, un TNO
- Saint-Maurice River
- Petite rivière Croche
- Rivière du Brûlé
- Patrick River
- Liste des cours d'eau du bassin du Saint-Maurice
- List of rivers of Quebec
