= Bostonnais River =

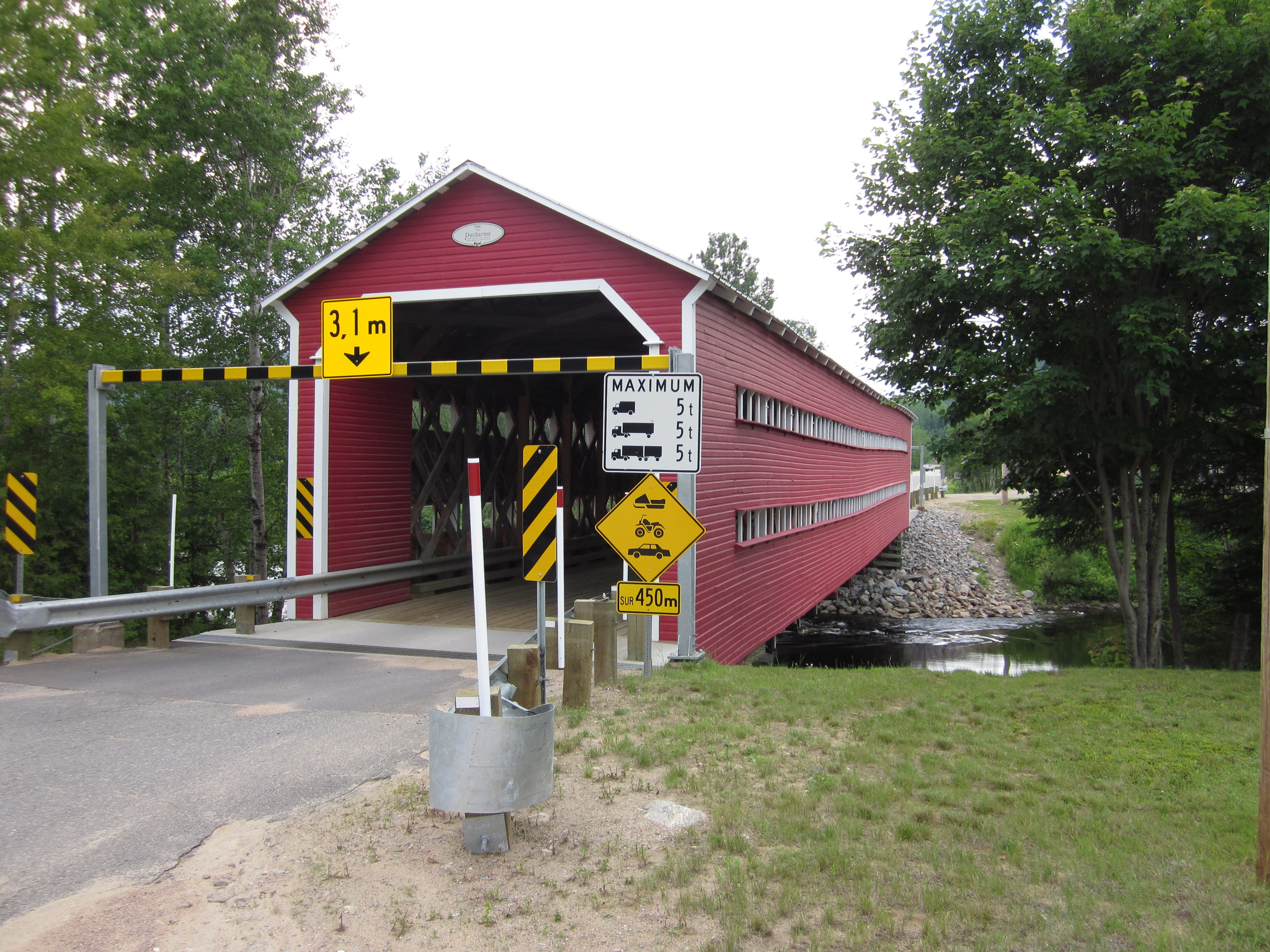
- Bostonnais River at the Ducharme Bridge in La Bostonnais.

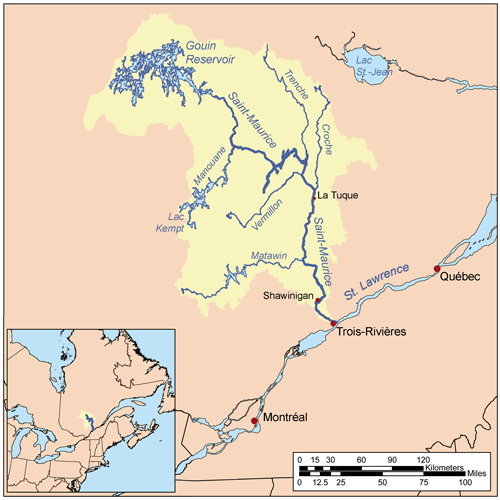
- Native name: Rivière Bostonnais (French)

Location
- Country: Canada
- Province: Quebec
- Region: Mauricie

Physical characteristics
- Source: Lake Kiskissink
  - elevation: 395 m (1,296 ft)
- Mouth: Saint-Maurice River
  - location: La Tuque (Quebec)
  - coordinates: 47°27′34″N 72°46′47″W
  - elevation: 151 m (495 ft)
- Length: 96 km (60 mi)

The river Bostonais or Bostonians is a river of Canada, located in Quebec, in the administrative region of Mauricie, in La Tuque (urban agglomeration).

== Geography ==
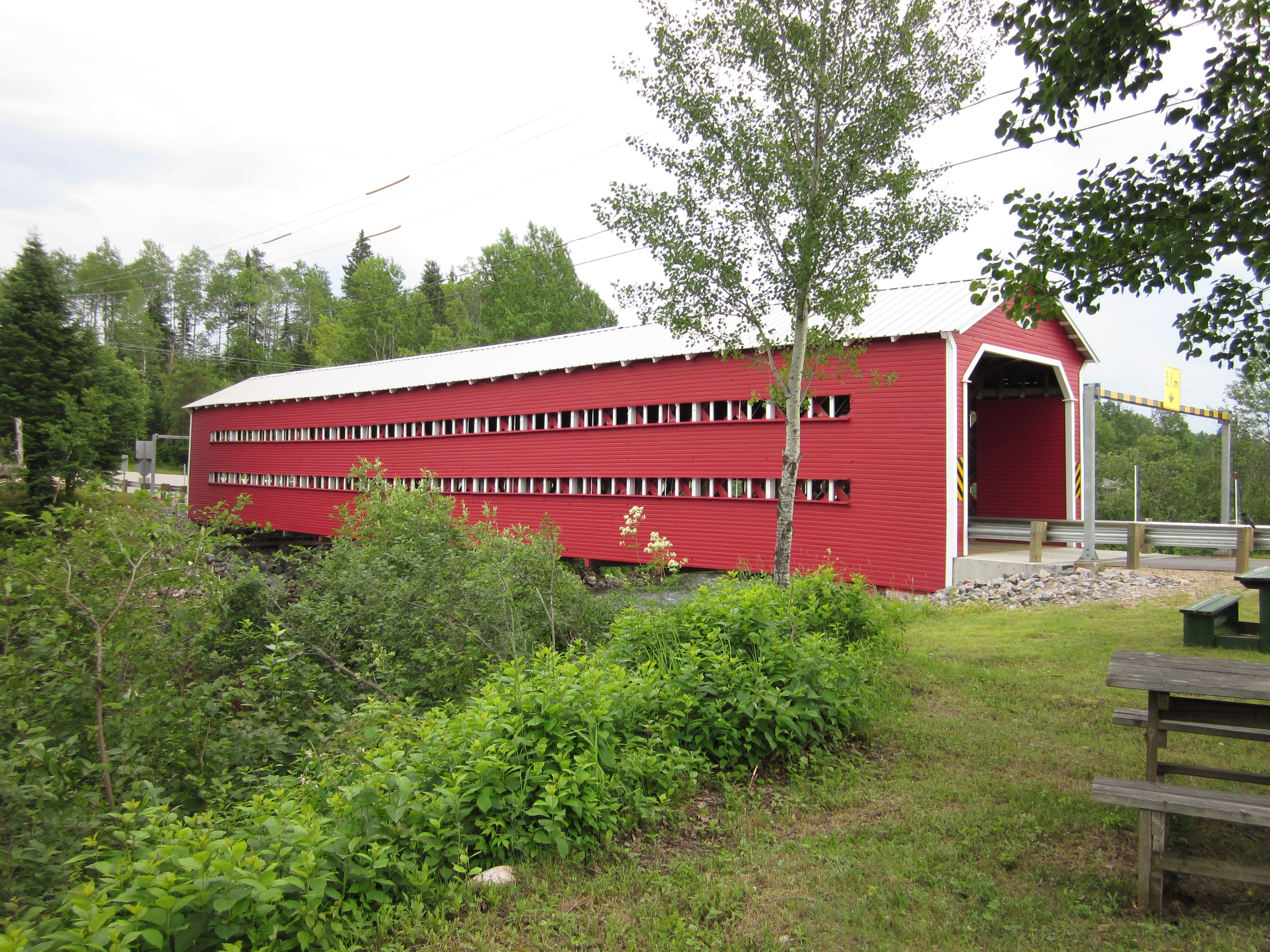
Ducharme Bridge west

This river of 96 km takes its sources in main lakes, located at almost highest elevation in the mountains : the lake Ventadour on Lake Lescarbot on Lake Kiskissink and Grand Lake Bostonnais, in the heart of the Zec Kiskissink. In upper-Bostonnais, from the small lake "du Chalet" (an affluent of lake Ventadour), water flows from one lake to the other up to the mouth of Grand Lake Bostonnais.

The Zec Kiskissink covers the line of the watershed between the Saint-Maurice River and that of Lac Saint-Jean. The river Bostonnais flows in a south-westerly direction to throw in Saint-Maurice River at north of the urban area of La Tuque.

This river whose surface is usually frozen from November to April, flows mainly in forest land, except for the last kilometers before its mouth. It runs through a village, or La Bostonnais, and then flows into the Saint-Maurice River in the northern section of the city of La Tuque.

The course of the river fellow the path on the southeast side of route 155 on the last 39 km (measured by water). However, at 2.1 km upstream of the Canadian National railway bridge, marking its mouth, the river crosses route 155. At the end of its course, the river makes a series of coils including around the peninsula of La Tuque municipal campground, then it passes under the railway bridge and at the La Tuque Water Aerodrome.

Route 155 follows the valley of the river Bostonnais (the northwest side of the river) to 51 km from its mouth. From this point, the river comes from the East, while the road heading north and then northeast to head the sector Chambord, passing near lakes "Écarté" and "des Commissaires". The distance between Chambord and La Tuque is 134 km (by road).

== Origin of name ==
The name of this river 88 km commemorates Jean-Baptiste Bostonians, a trapper Abenaki originally from Boston, Massachusetts, New England who had a hunting service in the region. His name often comes up in local place names such as the Large and Little Bostonnais lakes, the Bostonians channel, the Little Bostonnais River and Bostonnais island. The river gave its name to the village of La Bostonnais, which with La Tuque is the only community on the banks of this river.

== See also ==
- Ducharme Bridge
- Grand Lake Bostonnais
- La Bostonnais (municipality)
- La Tuque (city)
- La Tuque (urban agglomeration)
- Little Bostonnais River
- Saint-Maurice River
