= La Bostonnais, Quebec =

La Bostonnais
- Municipality
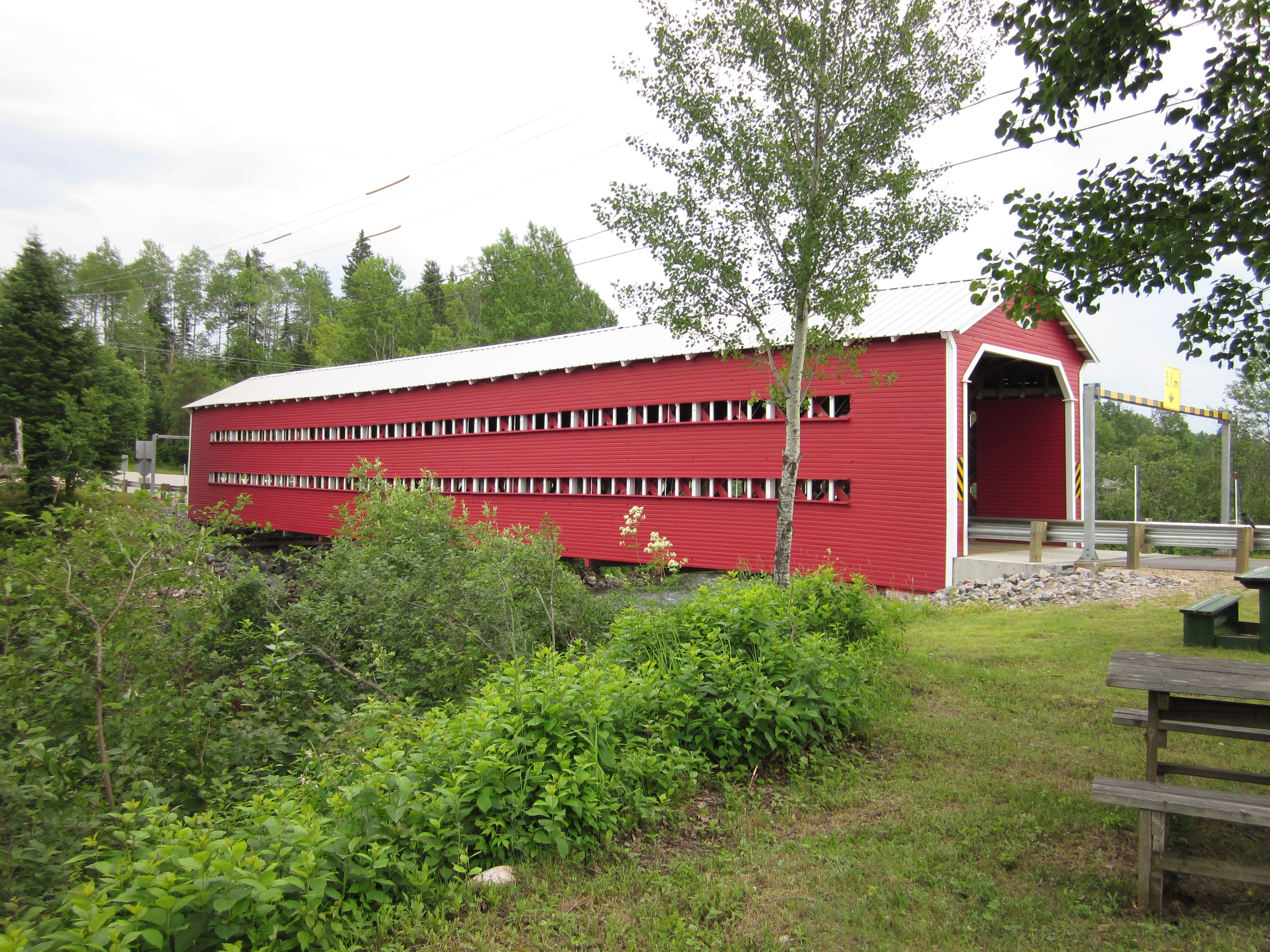
- Ducharme Bridge in the centre of La Bostonnais

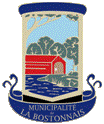
- Coat of arms

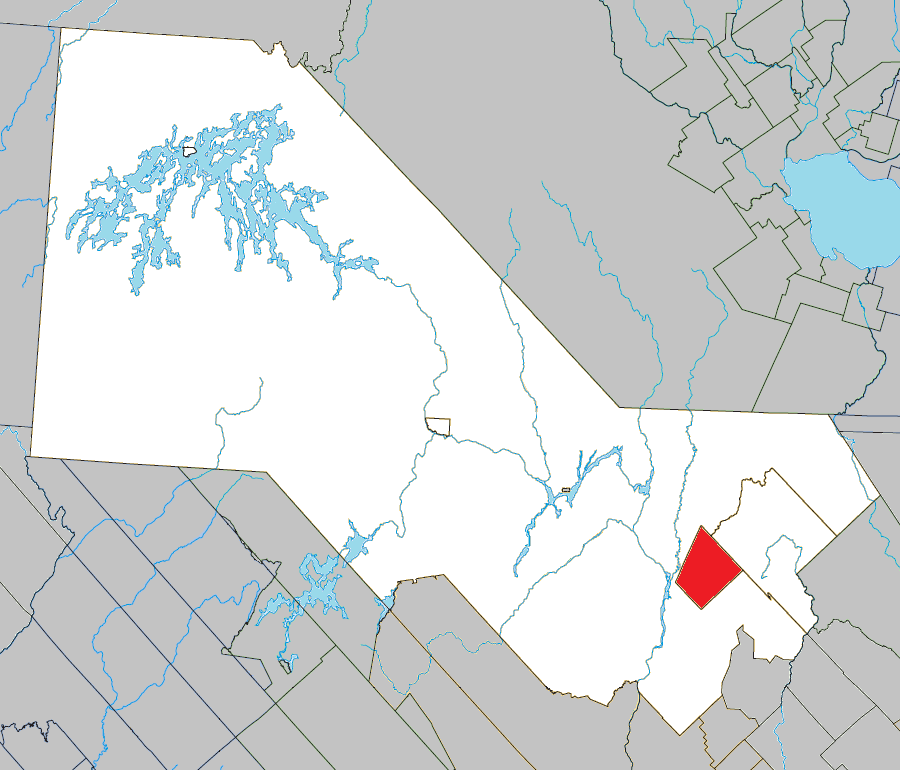
- Location within La Tuque TE.

- Location in central Quebec.
- Coordinates: 47°31′N 72°41′W
- Country: Canada
- Province: Quebec
- Region: Mauricie
- RCM: None
- Agglomeration: La Tuque
- Settled: 1871
- Constituted: January 1, 2006

Government
  - Mayor: Chantal St-Louis
  - Federal riding: Saint-Maurice—Champlain
  - Prov. riding: Laviolette

Area
  - Total: 289.30 km^{2} (111.70 sq mi)
  - Land: 284.32 km^{2} (109.78 sq mi)

Population (2021)
  - Total: 556
  - Density: 2/km^{2} (5.2/sq mi)
  - Pop 2016-2021: ▼12.4%
  - Dwellings: 374
- Time zone: UTC−5 (EST)
  - Summer (DST): UTC−4 (EDT)
- Postal code(s): G9X 0A7
- Area code: 819
- Highways: R-155

La Bostonnais is a municipality in the Mauricie region of the province of Quebec in Canada. The community is about 10 kilometres (6.2 mi) north of La Tuque's town centre along Quebec Route 155.

The municipality takes its name from the nearby Bostonnais and Little Bostonnais Rivers. This name probably came from an American man originally from Boston who joined the Abenaki at the beginning of the 19th century. In 1823, a reference was made to an Abenaki man named Jean-Baptiste Bostonnais who had one of his daughters baptized at Trois-Rivières. The Bostonnais family had their hunting territory in the area where the namesake rivers flow.

== History ==
The area, located within the geographic township of Bourgeoys, opened up for colonization around 1871. The Mission of Saint-Jean-Bosco was formed in 1946 and became a parish two years later. In 1946, the post office opened, and closed again in 1961. It was constituted as a municipality in 1987.

On March 26, 2003 it became part of the City of La Tuque as part of the early 2000s municipal reorganization in Quebec, but following a 2004 referendum, the Municipalities of La Bostonnais and Lac-Édouard were reconstituted on January 1, 2006. It remains part of the urban agglomeration of La Tuque. It had formerly been part of Le Haut-Saint-Maurice Regional County Municipality, which was abolished in the wake of the merger; after demerger, it is one of the few municipalities (other than in the Nord-du-Québec region) that is not part of any regional county municipality.

== Demographics ==
Population trend:

- Population in 2021: 556 (2016 to 2021 population change: -12.4%)
- Population in 2016: 635
- Population in 2011: 503
- Population in 2006: 617
- Population in 2001: 529
- Population in 1996: 524
- Population in 1991: 473

Private dwellings occupied by usual residents: 268 (total dwellings: 374)

Mother tongue:

- English as first language: 1.8%
- French as first language: 97.3%
- English and French as first language: 0%
- Other as first language: 0%

== See also ==
- La Tuque
- La Tuque (urban agglomeration)
- Bostonnais River
