= List of disc golf players =

This is a list of disc golfers.

- Catrina Allen
- Aimee Betro (1979 –) (US)
- Ken Climo (1968 – ) (US) Twelve-time PDGA World Champion
- James Conrad
- Nate Doss
- Dave Dunipace
- David Feldberg
- Holly Finley
- Ed Headrick
- Calvin Heimburg
- Sarah Hokom
- John Houck
- Avery Jenkins
- Valarie Jenkins
- Stancil Johnson
- Jeremy Koling
- Kristin Lätt (née Tattar)
- Simon Lizotte
- Nikko Locastro
- Paul McBeth
- Eric McCabe
- Eagle Wynne McMahon
- Tom Monroe (1947 – ) (US) Hall of Fame and disc golf champion)
- Paige Pierce
- Natalie Ryan
- Barry Schultz
- Johnny Sias
- Nathan Sexton
- Scott Stokely
- Paul Ulibarri
- Lloyd Weema
- Ken Westerfield
- Ricky Wysocki
