= Beaver State Fling =

Annual disc golf tournament in Oregon, US

The Beaver State Fling (BSF) is an annual disc golf tournament held at Riverbend Disc Golf Course at Milo McIver State Park in Estacada, Oregon.

== History ==
Originally created as part of the now defunct Oregon Series by Teresa Trueba Embree and Cris Bellinger, the Beaver State Fling was built up from its original C-Tier to a PDGA National Tour stop in 4 years. By 2005, it was the 5th largest tournament in the world by attendance. In 2010, spots filled up in 30 minutes and for the 2011 tournament new skill-level restrictions limited the number of professionals, while a lottery system was introduced for amateurs.

In 2020, the BSF was cancelled due to the COVID-19 pandemic. The 2021 BSF was cancelled as well, due to a combination of winter storm damage and uncertainty around the state of the pandemic.

== FPO Champions ==
In 2018, Catrina Allen overcame a 3 stroke deficit in the final round to defeat the 4 time World Champion (at the time) Paige Pierce in a 1 hole playoff.

Year	Dates	Champion	Margin of victory	Payout	First runner-up	Second runner-up	PDGA
2002	June 22–23	Teresa Bellinger	31	X	Miranda Erickson	Hillary Maurer	PDGA
2003	July 12–13	Toni Hoyman	5	X	Barbara Lane	Karen L Brown	PDGA
2004	August 28–29	Ruth Steele	1	$355	Carrie Berlogar	Courtney Peavy	PDGA
2005	May 28–29	Des Reading	8	$490	Elaine King	Carrie Berlogar	PDGA
2006	May 19–21	Des Reading(2)	2	$600	Juliana Korver	Valarie Jenkins	PDGA
2007	May 25–27	Valarie Jenkins	14	$655	Carrie Berlogar	Kathy Manley	PDGA
2008	July 18–20	Kathryn Manley	2	$520	Liz Lopez	Emily Hardy	PDGA
2009	May 22–24	Des Reading(3)	8	$1,210	Valarie Jenkins	Carrie Berlogar	PDGA
2010	May 28–30	Liz Carr	1	$1,095	Paige Pierce	Des Reading	PDGA
2011	May 24–26	Valerie Jenkins(2)	11	$1,545	Sarah Hokom	Paige Pierce	PDGA
2012	June 15–17	Catrina Allen	3	$1,500	Paige Pierce	Valarie Jenkins	PDGA
2013	June 28–30	Sarah Cunningham	2	$2,000	Paige Pierce	Des Reading	PDGA
2014	April 26–27	Valarie Jenkins(3)	20	$215	Zoe AnDyke	Sally West	PDGA
2015	June 12–14	Jessica Weese	1	$2,500	Valarie Jenkins	Catrina Allen	PDGA
2016	June 10–12	Catrina Allen(2)	0 (playoff)	$1,750	Paige Pierce	Paige Bjerkaas	PDGA
2017	June 9–11	Paige Pierce	18	$2,000	Valarie Jenkins	Catrina Allen	PDGA
2018	June 8–10	Catrina Allen(3)	0 (playoff)	$2,100	Paige Pierce	Valarie Jenkins	PDGA
2019	June 7–9	Paige Pierce(2)	3	$2,250	Catrina Allen	Jennifer Allen	PDGA
2022	June 10–12	Valerie Mandujano	4	$2,000	Catrina Allen	Ohn Scoggins	PDGA
2023	May 19–21	Jennifer Allen	2	$2,500	Holyn Handley	Maria Oliva	PDGA
2024	June 7–9	Holyn Handley	0 (playoff)	$6,500	Ohn Scoggins	Natalie Ryan	PDGA
2025	July 11–13	Zoe AnDyke	1	$800	Taylor Chocek	Amy Lewis	PDGA
2026	May 1–3	Sai Ananda	7	$612	Zoe AnDyke	Amy Lewis	PDGA

== MPO Champions ==
During the 2015 tournament, Paul McBeth made up a 4 stroke deficit going into the final round to force a sudden death playoff with Will Schusterick. McBeth prevailed on the third hole of the playoff to claim his second BSF title. In 2016, Philo Brathwaite carded a 2, or an albatross, on the 850-foot par 5 6th hole of the west course. It is one of the most famous shots in disc golf history. In 2019, Eagle McMahon fought off Seppo Paju to become just the third MPO player to win consecutive BSF titles.

Year	Dates	Champion	Margin of victory	Payout	First runner-up	Second runner-up	PDGA
2002	June 22–23	Erik Smith	3	$295	Aaron Kirschling	Ray Antoon	PDGA
2003	July 12–13	Aaron Kirschling	1	$331	Tom Embree	Lane Mason	PDGA
2004	August 28–29	Barry Schultz	0 (playoff)	$1,500	David Feldberg	Lane Mason	PDGA
2005	May 28–29	Barry Schultz(2)	1	$1,865	David Feldberg	Steve Rico	PDGA
2006	May 19–21	Barry Schultz(3)	5	$1,345	Dave Feldberg	Steve Rico	PDGA
2007	May 25–27	Nate Doss	0 (playoff)	$1,615	Dave Feldberg / Avery Jenkins	x	PDGA
2008	July 18–20	Steve Rico	4	$1,120	Gregg Barsby / Tim Skellenger	x	PDGA
2009	May 22–25	Ken Climo	7	$2,850	Avery Jenkins	Nikko Locastro	PDGA
2010	May 28–30	Christian Dietrich	1	$2,660	Nikko Locastro	Nate Doss / Bradley Williams	PDGA
2011	May 24–26	Paul McBeth	1	$3,000	Nate Doss / Dave Feldberg	x	PDGA
2012	June 15–17	Cale Leviska	1	$2,400	Tim Skellenger	Will Schusterick	PDGA
2013	June 28–30	Will Schusterick	2	$3,600	Nate Doss	Ricky Wysocki	PDGA
2014	April 26–27	Nate Sexton	2	$455	Nate Doss	Dion Arlyn	PDGA
2015	June 12–14	Paul McBeth(2)	0 (playoff)	$3,500	Will Schusterick	Ricky Wysocki / Nate Doss	PDGA
2016	June 10–12	Ricky Wysocki	3	$3,750	Philo Brathwaite	Paul Ulibarri / Paul McBeth / Nikko Locastro / Nate Sexton	PDGA
2017	June 9–11	Ricky Wysocki(2)	0 (playoff)	$4,000	Paul McBeth	Eagle McMahon	PDGA
2018	June 8–10	Eagle McMahon	2	$4,250	Paul Ulibarri	Kevin Jones / Garret Gurthie	PDGA
2019	June 7–9	Eagle McMahon(2)	1	$5,000	Seppo Paju	Ricky Wysocki	PDGA
2022	June 10–12	Garrett Gurthie	2	$2,500	Joel Freeman	Corey Ellis	PDGA
2023	May 19–21	Eagle McMahon(3)	3	$3,000	Andrew Presnell / Calvin Heimburg	x	PDGA
2024	June 7–9	Gannon Buhr	1	$10,000	Ezra Robinson / Ricky Wysocki	x	PDGA
2025	July 11–13	Dallas Garber	1	$1,500	Stefan Vincent	Ty Love	PDGA
2026	May 1–3	Drew Gibson	0 (playoff)	$1,221	Timothy TenKley	Jason Lawson	PDGA
