= Alex Geisinger =

American professional disc golfer (born 1992)

Personal information
- Full name: Alex Geisinger
- Nationality: United States
- Born: March 27, 1992 (age 34) Edina, Minnesota
- Height: 6 ft 3 in (191 cm)

Sport
- Sport: Disc golf
- Turned pro: 2012

Alex Geisinger (born March 27, 1992) is a former American professional disc golfer from Lakeville, Minnesota. He has 26 career professional wins, including the 2014 and 2015 Minnesota Majestic. Geisinger was the 19th ranked player in the PDGA World Rankings at the end of 2016.

Geisinger turned pro in 2012. His career earnings are $45,299.00 (as of April 2022). His sponsors include Innova Discs, Airborn Disc Golf, Delta Cart, Sportsack, Teeboxx, Upper Park Designs, VisionQuest, and Marty Chiropractic & Wellness. Geisinger is widely regarded as one of the top distance throwers in disc golf, and was the USDGC Distance Champion in 2015.

== Professional career ==
Alex began his competitive disc golf career in 2012 playing in 4 tournaments in the Advanced Division and finishing 10th at the United States Amateur Disc Golf Championships. After competing in the USADGC, he moved up to the professional division and competed in 2 events. Alex and his now-fiancée Jessica became parents at the end of 2012. Thus began the difficult balancing act between family, work, and professional disc golf.

=== 2013 season ===
Alex took the MN disc golf scene by storm in 2013. Although he competed in only 5 events due to work and family life, he had 3 wins, a 3rd-place finish, and a 14th-place finish, cashing at each tournament and earning $1840 in the process. His 3 wins came by an average of 7 strokes. After dabbling with local competitive play in 2013, Alex set out to participate in more local events and the National Tour in 2014.

=== 2014 season ===
Alex competed in 9 professional events during the 2014 season. He had a rough start to the year, competing in his first National Tour event - the Memorial Championship by Discraft. He placed 80th out of 120 athletes. He had a strong showing throughout the rest of the season, winning the Minnesota Majestic by 2 strokes over Ricky Wysocki and the Minnesota State Championships by six strokes. Alex also took home three 2nd-place finishes while placing in the top 6 in the rest of his events. Alex closed out the 2014 season earning a total of $4,280.

=== 2015 season ===
2015 was a year of travel for Geisinger. He began the year with an A-Tier tournament in Iowa, taking 3rd place behind reigning world champion Paul McBeth and Gregg Barsby at The Rumble sponsored by Latitude 64. He placed 2nd in his next tournament behind fellow Minnesotan Cale Leiviska. His third tournament was the Minnesota Majestic, where he was the reigning champion. He shot two rounds rated over 1050 to defend his title, besting Cale Leiviska, Steve Rico, and Matt Dollar to take home a $2,400 prize. Alex continued to perform well through the season, with 3 wins, a 5th-place finish, and a 6th-place finish. His final tournament of the year was also his first Major Tournament; the United States Disc Golf Championship. Alex took home 22nd place and $910, finishing ahead of notable pros such as Philo Brathwaite and Eagle McMahon. Alex also won the USDGC distance competition with a throw of 739 feet, narrowly beating Simon Lizotte's 722 foot toss.

=== 2016 season ===
2016 saw Geisinger competing in seven A-Tier events, two National Tour events, and one Major Tournament. He began the year at The Rumble finishing only two strokes behind Paul Ulibarri. He then played in his first National Tournament of the year, the Kansas City Wide Open, where he finished in 6th place but only three strokes behind the 2nd-place finisher. Alex performed well throughout the year, placing in the top 10 in eight of the ten other events he played. This included a tie for 8th place at National Tour event The Vibram Open, four spots ahead of reigning World Champion Paul McBeth. Alex was unable to win The Minnesota Majestic for the third straight year. He finished in 5th place despite being only six strokes behind winner and eventual 2016 World Champion Ricky Wysocki. Geisinger finished the year by competing in the United States Disc Golf Championship where he finished in 13th place. Alex once again competed in the USDGC distance championships. He finished in 3rd place with a toss of 609 feet.

== Professional wins (14 total) ==
Geisinger has a total of 14 wins including five A Tier wins. He has also placed in the top 25 in two Majors and two National Tournaments.

=== A Tiers (5) ===
Year	Tournament	Stroke Margin	Winning score	Runner up	Prize money
2013	NorthStar Throwdown	-4	(51-66-49=166)	Ross Brandt	$1,000
2014	Minnesota Majestic	-2	(75-48-53-71-29=276)	Ricky Wysocki	$1,400
2015	The Majestic	-3	(70-73=143)	Cale Leiviska	$2,400
2015	Lake Superior Open	-6	(53-57-59-30=199)	Mitch Privette	$895
2016	Lake Superior Open	-4	(75-85=160)	Adam Hammes	$1,335

=== Summary ===
Competition Tier	Wins	2nd	3rd	Top-5	Top-25	Events*
Majors	0	0	0	0	2	2
National Tour	0	0	0	0	2	3
A Tier	5	2	1	13	18	20

*As of April 11, 2017

=== Annual statistics ===
Year	Events	Wins	Top 3	Earnings	$ / Event	Rating	World Ranking
2012	2	0	0	$40	$20	-	-
2013	5	3	4	$1,840	$368	1023	-
2014	9	2	5	$4,280	$475.56	1010	-
2015	9	4	6	$8,392	$932.44	1021	37
2016	12	2	4	$11,389	$949.08	1021	19
Career	37	11	19	$25,941	$701.11	-	-

== Equipment ==
Geisinger is sponsored by Innova Champion Discs. He commonly carries a combination of the following discs:

Drivers:

- Destroyer (Star)
- Destroyer (Champion)
- Firebird (Champion)
- Road runner (Champion)
- TeeBird (Champion)
- Eagle (Champion)
- Whippet (CE)

Midranges:

- Roc (KC Pro, Star)

Putters:

- Whale (Champion)
- Nova (XT)
- Aviar (KC Pro)
