= James Conrad =

Professional disc golfer

Personal information
- Full name: James Conrad
- Nickname: Jungle James
- Nationality: United States
- Born: May 4, 1990 (age 36)
- Height: 6 ft 3 in (191 cm)
- Weight: 175 lb (79 kg)

Sport
- Sport: Disc golf
- Turned pro: 2006

James Conrad (born May 4, 1990) is a professional disc golfer from Blacksburg, Virginia, currently competing on the Disc Golf Pro Tour. He Joined the Professional Disc Golf Association in 2000 and became a professional in 2006. Conrad has won both the PDGA World Championships, in 2021, and the United States Disc Golf Championship, in 2019.

Conrad is most notable for throwing what is widely considered the most famous shot in disc golf history: a 247-foot approach shot he hit for birdie on the final hole at the 2021 PDGA Professional Disc Golf World Championship. The shot forced a playoff with Paul McBeth, which Conrad won on the first hole to secure his first world championship title. The shot was the number one play on ESPN's SportsCenter Top 10 highlight segment, and was widely covered throughout mainstream sports media.

In 266 career PDGA events, he has 31 wins and has amassed $186,092 in winnings.

== Sponsorships ==
Conrad was sponsored by Innova Champion Discs starting in 2016. In January 2021 he signed a two-year sponsorship deal with MVP Disc Sports.

=== Majors (2) ===
Year	Tournament	Stroke Margin	Winning score	Runner up	Prize money
2019	United States Disc Golf Championship	-1	-19 (64-58-58-69=249)	Jeremy Koling	$12,000
2021	Professional Disc Golf World Championship	0 (Playoff)	-39 (50-56-52-54-54=266)	Paul McBeth	$16,500

== Signature Discs ==
James Conrad is a member of MVP Discs team, and has his own line of discs and bags from the company. The discs include:

- Zenith, a distance driver
- Terra, a fairway driver
- Nomad, a putt and approach disc
- Detour, a midrange driver
- Trail, a distance driver
