= Paul McBeth =

American disc golfer (born 1990)

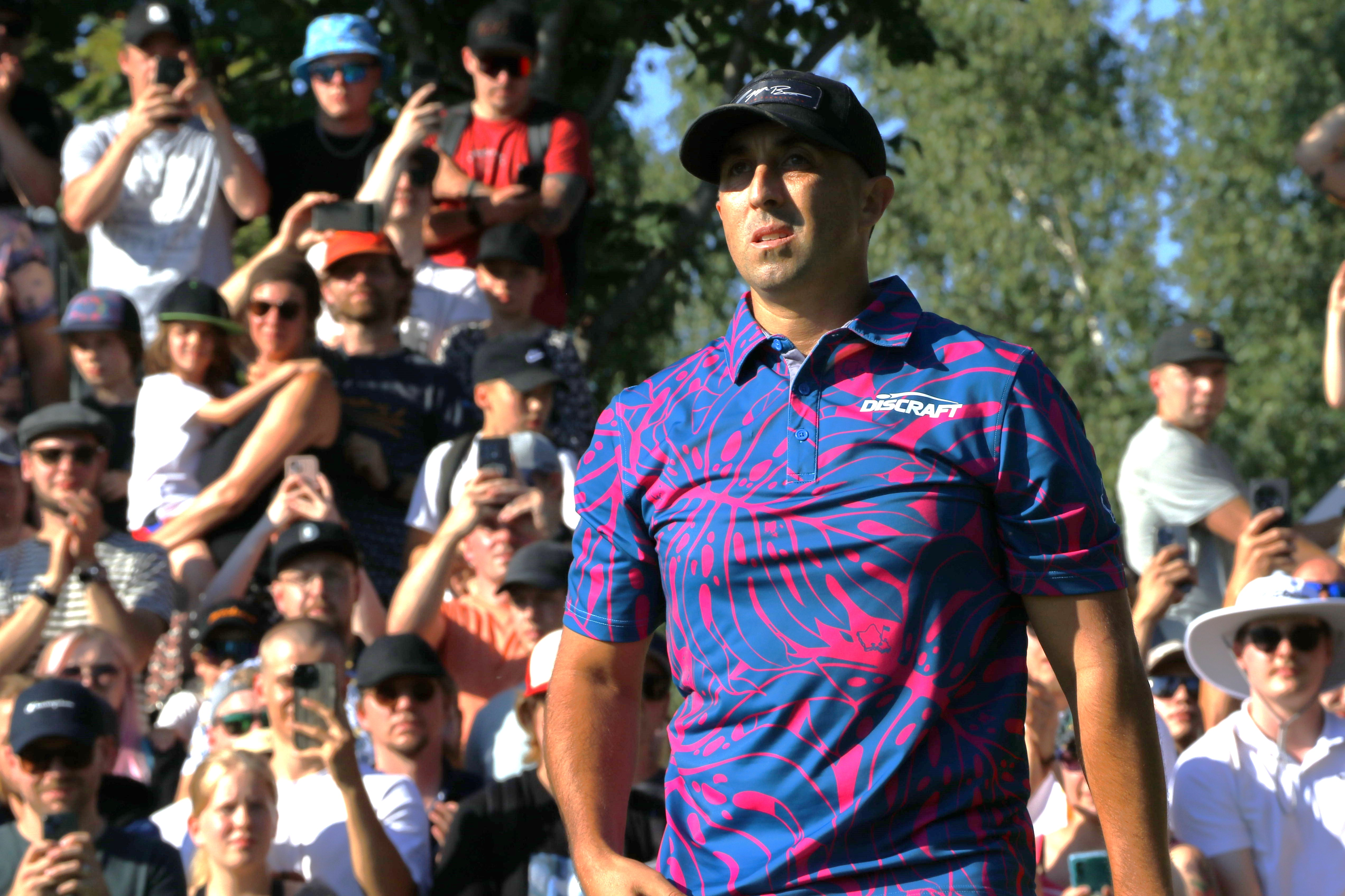
- Paul McBeth at the 2024 European Open.

Personal information
- Full name: Paul McBeth
- Nationality: United States
- Born: July 9, 1990 (age 36) Huntington Beach, California, U.S.
- Height: 68 in (173 cm)
- Spouse: Hannah McBeth (m. 2018)

Sport
- Sport: Disc golf
- Turned pro: 2008

Paul McBeth (born July 9, 1990) is an American professional disc golfer from Huntington Beach, California. He won the PDGA World Championships four times in a row (2012, 2013, 2014, and 2015) and again in 2019 and 2022, making him a six-time champion.

McBeth did not finish outside the top 2 at a World championship between 2012 and 2022. McBeth was the top rated player of the PDGA in 2015, 2017, 2018, and again in 2019. He is widely considered to be the best disc golfer of the modern era.

McBeth turned pro in 2008. His career earnings are $871,517.09 (as of May 2026). He proposed to Hannah Croke in April 2017 and got married in December 2018.

In 2021, Paul McBeth founded the Paul McBeth Foundation, a non-profit organization dedicated to bringing the sport of disc golf to underserved communities around the world.

== Professional career ==
Although he played his first professional event in 2006, McBeth's professional career began in 2008, when he played in 29 professional events, netting $11,852.50 in winnings and earning the PDGA Male Rookie of the Year Award. Along with his six World titles, McBeth has received the PDGA Male Player of the year three times (2013, 2014, 2015). On October 8, 2019 McBeth held a PDGA rating of 1060 which, at the time, was the highest rating ever achieved by a professional disc golfer. This was exceeded on March 13, 2020, when he was rated 1061.

=== 2014 season ===
During McBeth's 2014 campaign, he competed in 25 tournaments which netted him $40,907. Of the 25 tournaments he competed in, McBeth won 15, placed 2nd in 5, and 3rd in 3. McBeth's worst finish of the year was 6th place, which happened twice. He took home many key trophies and topped it off with a World Championship.

In the Memorial Championship, a National Tour event, McBeth bested Johne McCray by 4 strokes after coming into the final round tied. His final round performance netted him $4,000.

McBeth also won two majors. First, McBeth was able to net himself $4,412 and a victory in the European Masters by shooting a final round, tournament-best score of -12, giving him the win over second place finisher Karl Johan Nybo by 4 strokes.

The second major McBeth won during the 2014 season was the coveted PDGA World Championship. He and Ricky Wysocki were tied after the final hole resulting in a sudden-death playoff. The playoff would eventually go to five holes before McBeth ultimately took home the World Championship and the $5,000 prize that came with it.

=== 2015 season ===
McBeth dominated the 2015 season, winning 19 of 25 events by an average of almost 6 strokes and finishing in the top 3 in every event. He won all five Major events, disc golf's first Grand Slam, including his fourth World title and his first ever win at the USDGC, making him only the third man to win both the World and US titles in the same year (after Ken Climo and Barry Schultz). McBeth also took home three NT wins and earned enough points to win the National Tour for the fourth straight year.

=== 2016 season ===
2016 started off looking like a continuation of McBeth's commanding 2015 season. After winning a B-Tier event in California, McBeth won the Memorial Championship (NT), followed by the La Mirada Open, the first event of the Disc Golf World Tour (DGWT). At the Nick Hyde Memorial (A-Tier), McBeth lost in a sudden death playoff with Nate Sexton and Simon Lizotte, who went on to win the event. Over the next three events, McBeth lost the Glass Blown Open (NT) by one stroke to Cam Todd, the Konopiste Open (DGWT) in a playoff to Lizotte, and the Masters Cup by one stroke to Ricky Wysocki on a 70-foot putt. Citing knee pain as the reason for his falling putting percentage, McBeth switched to a straddle stance for the European Open (DGWT), an event he has not lost since 2011. The switch was effective, and McBeth bested Wysocki by two strokes to win the event. Back home in the United States, however, McBeth's struggles continued. He placed 3rd in the Beaver State Fling (NT), and then tied for 12th place in the Vibram Open (NT), his lowest finish in three years. After another one stroke loss to Wysocki at the European Masters (DGWT), McBeth took another 12th-place finish at the Majestic. Wysocki continued his incredible season with his first World title, beating McBeth by 6 strokes and ending his 4-year winning streak. Feeling healthy and his form back in check, McBeth took a commanding 12 stroke win at the Ledgestone Insurance Open the next week, followed by an 11 stroke victory at the Brent Hambrick Memorial Open (NT). McBeth finished the National Tour in second place behind Wysocki, ending another 4-year streak. At the end of the inaugural Disc Golf Pro Tour, McBeth placed 4th in the Green Mountain Championship, resulting in a 5th-place finish in the points standings and an automatic berth into the Tour Championship semifinals, which he would go on to win. McBeth donated his $10,000 winnings from the Tour Championship to help pay medical bills for his cousin, who was injured in an accident. The 2016 season ended on a low note for McBeth: he finished in 20th place at the USDGC, shooting 2 over par after 3 rounds (the final round was cancelled due to Hurricane Matthew). Additionally, a scoring error in round 3 resulted in a two stroke penalty. Without the two stroke error, McBeth would have finished in 14th place, earning enough points to win the inaugural Disc Golf World Tour, but he instead took second place to Wysocki by just 75 points.

=== 2017 season ===
McBeth entered a total of 24 tournaments in 2017, winning 9 of them, and placing 2nd or 3rd in 12 others. His only major win of the season came at the European Open in Nokia, Finland, where he bested Gregg Barsby by only one stroke. For the second consecutive year, he finished runner-up to Ricky Wysocki in the 2017 PDGA Professional Disc Golf World Championships. McBeth's hottest streak of the season came during the spring months of March through May, where he won 5 of the 7 tournaments he entered and placed 2nd in the other two. Notable tournaments won during this streak were the DGPT Memorial Championship, the Nick Hyde Memorial, the Glass Blown Open, and the Masters Cup presented by Innova Disc Golf.

He notably had to withdraw from a significant tournament, Discraft's Green Mountain Championship, citing back pain. After posting a very un-McBeth-like 5-over par through only 13 holes during round 2, he decided to withdraw rather than face a prolonged injury. “Yeah, I hurt [my back] yesterday but didn’t know how bad until today,” McBeth said in a text message. “Couldn’t throw well so tried to play it out but it got too painful. Different spot [than my previous back injury] so I’m hoping it’s not too bad. If it was the final day probably would have tried to finish it. Way too much golf left to push it with USDGC next.” He would end up finishing 3rd in the USDGC Championship three weeks later.

For the season, he pocketed $69,425 in winnings, including a $10,000 payout for winning the PDGA National Tour Elite Series.

=== 2018 season ===
Paul McBeth's 2018 campaign was very similar to 2017 in terms of the number of tournaments he entered and won. Out of his 25 tournament appearances, McBeth notched 9 wins and finished 2nd or 3rd in 9 others.

His only major win of the year was the USDGC Championship on the Winthrop University Golf Course in Rock Hill, South Carolina. It was his 2nd USDGC victory (previous win was in 2015). McBeth got off to a blistering start, jumping out to a 7-stroke lead over James Conrad after two rounds. Conrad would eventually close the gap and tie McBeth after he cooled off over the final two rounds, but McBeth prevailed with a -34 to Conrad's -31. Relative newcomer Kevin Jones, who came within one stroke of tying McBeth on the back nine, eventually finished 3rd, four strokes back. This tournament was also notable for the fact that it featured live online coverage with Paul McBeth's wife Hannah providing on-course commentary.

On July 7, 2018 he had a historic round when he recorded a score of 18 under par (in 18 holes) during the second round on the Toboggan Course at the Great Lakes Open (McBeth would cruise to victory in the tournament). It was called "Near Perfect" and the round was featured on ESPN's SportsCenter.

In all, McBeth finished with $57,880.00 for the season. His other important tournament victories in 2018 included the Nick Hyde Memorial, the inaugural San Francisco Open, the Delaware Disc Golf Challenge, and The Ed Headrick Disc Golf Hall of Fame Classic (National Tour Finale).

Near the end of 2018 McBeth signed a 4-year deal with Discraft.

=== 2019 season ===
In 2019, McBeth played in 23 tournaments. Out of the 23 tournaments he won 14, placed 2nd in 5, and finished in the top 10 for the remaining tournaments, except for the United States Disc Golf Championship where he finished 64th. Mcbeth won $57,273 in prize money during his 2019 campaign. He took down some key tournaments throughout the season. McBeth bested Ricky Wysocki and Eagle McMahon by one stroke in the Glass Blown Open, a national tour event. He won the European Open, held in Nokia, Finland, beating Eagle McMahon by two strokes.

Mcbeth added his fifth world title in 2019. The 2019 Professional Disc Golf World Championships was held in Eureka, Illinois. McBeth went into the final round with a 6 stroke lead on Ricky Wysocki. He was able to shoot a -9 final round in order to hold off Wysocki by one stroke to win the title. This world title win netted Mcbeth $10,000.00 in prize money.

=== 2020 season ===
The 2020 season saw many tournament delays and cancellations due to the Coronavirus pandemic. During the modified season, McBeth played in 14 tournaments. He won 5 tournaments, placed second in 4, and placed top 10 in the remaining. McBeth won $32,729 in prize money during the 2020 season.

McBeth won two key Disc Golf Pro Tour tournaments during the 2020 season. First, McBeth won the Dynamic Discs Open (formerly the Glass Blown Open) and took home $4,000. This event was the played on CBS Sports Network, making it the first disc golf tournament to be played on a major sports network. In this event, he was able to hold off Calvin Heimburg by one stroke. McBeth shot the best round in both rounds 1 and 2, shooting -11 and -12 respectively.

He also took down the MVP Open, held at Maple Hill. McBeth also claimed $4,000 in prize money for his win. In this event, McBeth was able to beat Ricky Wysocki by 4 strokes to claim the trophy. Wysocki held a two stroke lead going into the final round. However, McBeth was able to put together a final round best -10 performance.

=== 2021 season ===
In February 2021, McBeth signed a 10-year deal with Discraft, worth $10 million.

October 9th 2021, McBeth won his 3rd US Disc Golf Championship in Rock Hill, South Carolina. Paul McBeth finished -26 tied with Kyle Klein whom he bested in a 1 round playoff.

== Professional wins (152 total) ==
McBeth has a total of 152 wins, including 6 World Championships, 11 other Majors, and 24 National Tour events. He won the PDGA National Tour in 2012, 2013, 2014, 2015, and 2017 and won the Disc Golf Pro Tour Championship in 2016.

=== PDGA Pro World Championships (6) ===
Year	Location	Stroke Margin	Winning score	Runner up	Prize money
2012	Charlotte, NC	-5	-83 (57-48-51-56-53-47-49-26=387)	Ricky Wysocki	$5,500
2013	Crown Point, IN	-5	-90 (52-54-49-53-46-54-45-29=382)	David Feldberg	$5,000
2014	Portland, OR	Playoff	-69 (52-54-52-53-50-56-58-28=403)	Ricky Wysocki	$5,000
2015	Pittsburgh, PA	-9	-75 (58-54-59-51-51-53-30=356)	Ricky Wysocki	$6,000
2019	Peoria, IL	-1	-45 (53-53-52-60-54=272)	Ricky Wysocki	$10,000
2022	Emporia, KS	Playoff	-46 (56-57-53-60-56=282)	Aaron Gossage	$20,000

=== Other Majors (11) ===
Year	Tournament	Stroke Margin	Winning score	Runner up	Prize money
2013	Copenhagen Open	-1	-41 (57-58-58-54=227)	Devan Owens	$2,236
2013	European Open	-1	-28 (57-56-59-56=228)	David Feldberg	$3,900
2014	European Masters	-4	-38 (55-55-56-52=218)	KJ Nybo	$4,412
2015	European Open	-1	-31 (52-54-60-59=225)	Ricky Wysocki	$4,480
2015	Aussie Open	-6	-39 (57-53-52-59=221)	Simon Lizotte	$4,666
2015	Scandinavian Open	-11	-44 (57-59-52-56=224)	Will Schusterick	$7,500
2015	US Disc Golf Championship	-5	-26 (62-62-57-61=242)	Ricky Wysocki	$8,000
2017	European Open	-1	-34 (55-57-55-52=219)	Gregg Barsby	$5,000
2018	US Disc Golf Championship	-3	-34 (54-55-63-62=234)	James Conrad	$10,000
2019	European Open	-2	-33 (54-54-61-54=223)	Eagle McMahon	$6,201
2021	US Disc Golf Championship	Playoff	-26 (60-61-55-62=238)	Kyle Klein	$20,000

Majors playoff record (3-2)

Year	Tournament	Opponent(s)	Result
2014	PDGA World Championships	Ricky Wysocki	Won with birdie on fifth extra hole
2014	US Disc Golf Championship	Will Schusterick, Johne McCray	Lost to birdie on second extra hole; McCray eliminated after first extra hole
2021	PDGA World Championships	James Conrad	Lost to birdie on first extra hole
2021	US Disc Golf Championship	Kyle Klein	Won with birdie on first extra hole
2022	PDGA World Championships	Aaron Gossage	Won with par on first extra hole

=== National Tour (24) ===
Year	Tournament	Stroke Margin	Winning score	Runner up	Prize money
2011	Memorial Championship	-3	-36 (47-49-50-48=194)	Nikko Locastro/Josh Anthon	$4,000
2011	Beaver State Fling	-1	-34 (52-55-54-49=210)	Nate Doss/David Feldberg	$3,000
2012	Memorial Championship	-3	-44 (45-44-53-46=188)	Will Schusterick	$3,500
2012	Masters Cup	-4	-30 (73-72-68=213)	Nate Doss	$2,040
2013	Masters Cup	-2	-18 (66-68-64=198)	Philo Brathwaite	$2,320
2013	Kansas City Wide Open	-5	-47 (48-49-54-50-23=224)	Nate Doss	$2,240
2013	Vibram Open	-13	-33 (54-54-50-45=203)	Will Schusterick	$3,000
2014	Memorial Championship	-4	-35 (51-51-48-47=197)	Johne McCray	$3,000
2014	Masters Cup	-2	-19 (66-63-68=197)	Ricky Wysocki	$2,500
2014	Kansas City Wide Open	-7	-36 (51-56-49-27=183)	Ricky Wysocki	$2,325
2014	Brent Hambrick Memorial Open	-10	-19 (74-45-82-25=226)	Paul Ulibarri/Tyler Horne	$1,600
2015	Glass Blown Open	-7	-34 (49-48-53=150)	David Feldberg	$5,000
2015	Masters Cup	-2	-24 (63-67-62=192)	Nate Doss	$3,000
2015	Beaver State Fling	Playoff	-30 (54-53-57-50=214)	Will Schusterick	$3,500
2016	Memorial Championship	-1	-45 (43-46-50-43=182)	Nathan Sexton	$4,000
2016	Brent Hambrick Memorial Open	-11	-36 (72-74-66-24=236)	Ricky Wysocki	$2,255
2017	Dynamic Discs Glass Blown Open	-2	-22 (50-47=97)	Nathan Sexton	$5,000
2017	Masters Cup	-10	-34 (50-47=97)	Ricky Wysocki	$4,000
2017	Pittsburgh Flying Disc Open	-3	-35 (54-54-55=163)	Simon Lizotte	$2,600
2018	Delaware Disc Golf Challenge	-4	-36 (61-61-58=180)	Ricky Wysocki	$3,000
2018	The Ed Headrick Disc Golf Hall of Fame Classic	-1	-28 (61-57-58=176)	Gregg Barsby	$2,500
2019	Dynamic Discs Glass Blown Open	-1	-16 (57-61-59-67=244)	Ricky Wysocki	$5,000
2021	Dynamic Discs Open	-6	-42 (59-55-56-56=226)	Ricky Wysocki	$6,000
2021	Des Moines Challenge	-2	-28 (57-54-53=164)	Calvin Heimburg	$7,000

National Tour Wins: 2012, 2013, 2014, 2015, 2017

NT playoff record (1-3)

Year	Tournament	Opponent	Result
2013	Memorial Championship	Will Schusterick	Lost to birdie on first extra hole
2015	Memorial Championship	Jeremy Koling	Lost to birdie after going OB on first extra hole
2015	Beaver State Fling	Will Schusterick	Won with birdie on third extra hole
2015	Hall of Fame Classic	Michael Johansen	Lost to par on fourth extra hole

=== Summary ===
Competition Tier	Wins	2nd	3rd	Top-5	Top-25	Events*
World Championships	6	4	0	10	17	17
Other Majors	11	4	5	23	36	41
National Tour	24	11	12	55	85	88

*As of October 19, 2025

=== Annual statistics ===
Year	Events	Wins	Top 3	Earnings	$ / Event	Rating^{†}	World Ranking^{†}
2006	1	0	0	$0	$0	953	-
2007	8	1	4	$1,590	$198.75	991	-
2008	29	7	9	$11,602	$400.07	1018	17
2009	26	3	10	$10,659	$409.96	1022	30
2010	14	5	9	$10,010	$715.00	1029	11
2011	31	8	15	$21,953	$708.16	1035	11
2012	36	8	22	$35,013	$972.58	1040	4
2013	32	19	28	$40,303	$1,259.47	1046	1
2014	24	14	22	$38,906	$1,621.08	1046	1
2015	25	19	25	$70,044	$2,801.76	1053	1
2016	19	7	15	$51,651	$2,718.47	1051	1
2017	25	10	23	$69,411	$2,776.44	1052	1
2018	25	9	18	$57,880	$2,315.20	1051	1
2019	23	14	19	$57,273	$2,490.13	1060	1
2020	14	5	10	$32,729	$2,337.79	1054	-^{*}
2021	25	6	14	$90,403	$3,616.12	1050	-^{*}
2022	27	8	13	$100,103	$3,707.52	1050	
2023	18	7	8	$33,444	$1,858.00	1049	4
2024	24	2	7	$52,206	$2,175.25	1040	6
2025	24	3	6	$80,261	$3,344.21	1047	5
Career	450	155	277	$865,441	$1923.20	-	-

†At Year End
*The World Ranking was paused in 2020 and 2021 due to the Covid-19 pandemic

== Sponsorship ==
McBeth was sponsored by Innova Champion Discs from 2005 to 2018. On November 19, 2018, McBeth announced that he would be sponsored by Discraft for the 2019 season, announcing a 4 year $1 Million deal. In 2021, it was determined he had already outgrown this deal through disc sales and overall value to the company, so his sponsorship was extended for an additional 10 years, for $10 million.

Additionally, McBeth is sponsored by Grip Equipment and Foundation Disc Golf, of which he is a former part owner with Brodie Smith.

== Paul McBeth Foundation ==
In 2021, Paul McBeth founded the Paul McBeth Foundation, a non-profit organization dedicated to bringing the sport of disc golf to underserved communities around the world. The foundation focuses on installing disc golf courses in areas lacking access to disc golf, with the aim of creating opportunities for others through the sport.

The Paul McBeth Foundation operates with a mission to "develop and sustain disc golf as a recreational activity globally." By partnering with local governments, organizations, and volunteers, the foundation ensures the installation and sustainability of disc golf courses, offering opportunities for people of all ages and backgrounds to enjoy the game. The foundation's efforts extend beyond merely installing courses; they also provide educational programs, equipment donations, and community events to foster a lasting disc golf culture in each location they serve.

Since its inception, the Paul McBeth Foundation has installed numerous disc golf courses in diverse locations, ranging from rural areas in the United States to international sites in countries such as Mexico and Uganda. The foundation's work has been supported by donations from the disc golf community and beyond, with Paul McBeth's influence and reputation playing a significant role in garnering support.

The foundation maintains an active presence on social media and YouTube, where they share documentary-style videos and practice rounds from the courses they install. These videos not only highlight the foundation's projects but also aim to increase awareness and drive donations to support their ongoing mission.

Through the Paul McBeth Foundation, Paul McBeth has leveraged his status as a prominent professional disc golfer to make a positive impact on communities around the world, using the sport as a tool for social good and community development.
