= Portland open =

Annual disc golf tournament in Oregon, US

The Portland Open is an annual disc golf tournament held most recently at the Glendoveer Golf Course in Portland, Oregon.

== History ==
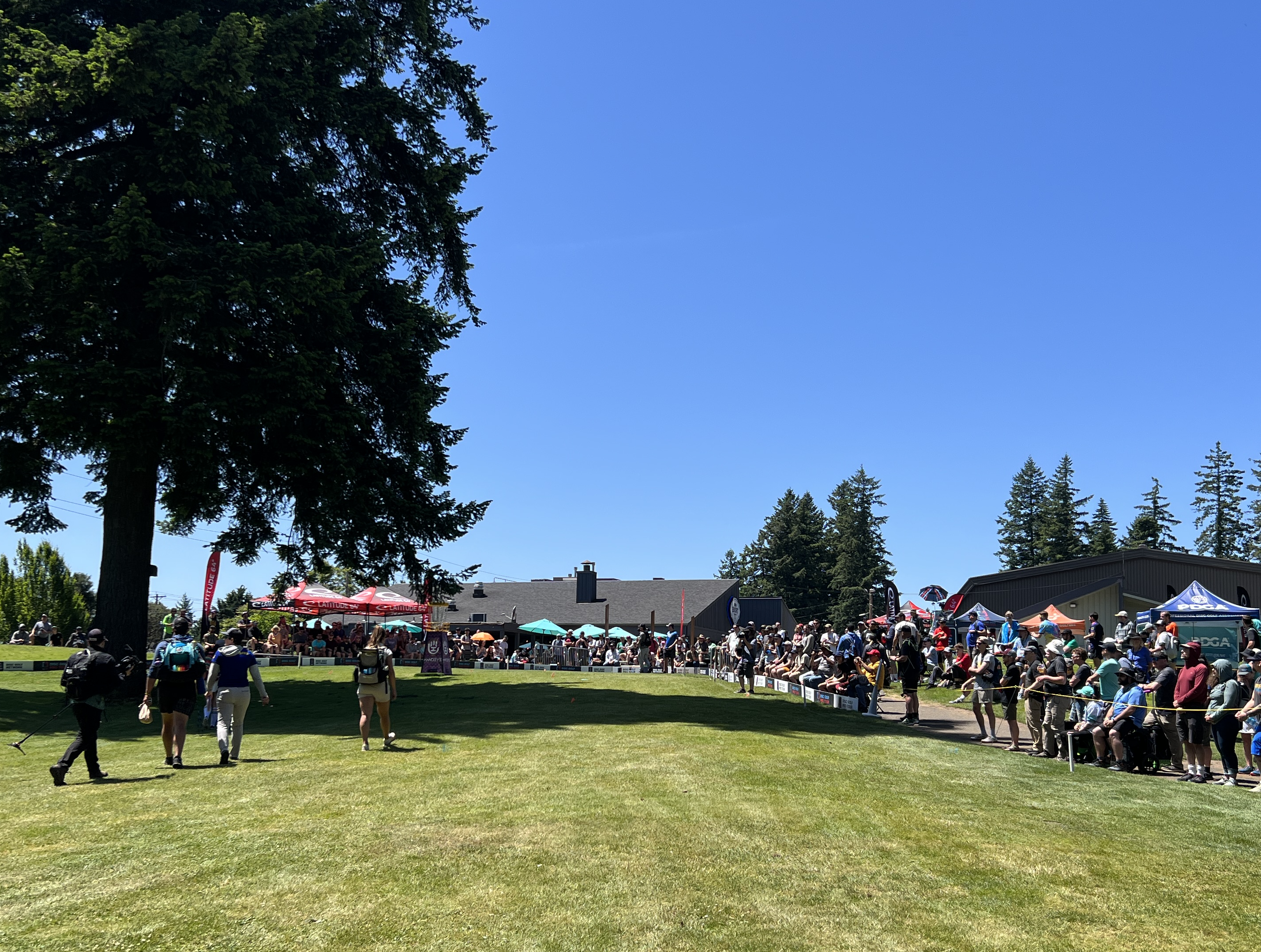
Players approach the 18th green during the 2023 Portland Open

The Portland Open was founded in 2019 and held at Blue Lake Park. In 2020, the Portland Open was cancelled due to the COVID-19 pandemic. The Portland Open returned in 2021, and due to ongoing pandemic precautions, was moved to Glendoveer Golf Course where spectator tickets sold out quickly. In 2022, the Open consisted of two rounds at Blue Lake Park and the final two rounds at Glendoveer Golf Course. More than 2,000 spectators attended the event. For the 2023 tournament, two 18-hole courses were constructed at the Glendoveer Golf complex, with two rounds played on the East course and two rounds played on the West. The 2023 edition was also notable for being the first ever Disc Golf Pro Tour Elite+ event. Per the tour's original press release, “Elite+ events will feature bigger purses, additional media focus, and elevated spectator experiences.”

== FPO Champions ==
Year	Dates	Champion	Margin of victory	Payout	First runner-up	Second runner-up	PDGA
2019	May 25–27	Paige Pierce	2	$1,775	Catrina Allen	Lisa Fajkus	PDGA
2021	June 4–6	Paige Pierce (2)	7	$3,000	Catrina Allen	Ella Hansen	PDGA
2022	June 2–5	Valerie Mandujano	9	$5,000	Ohn Scoggins	Catrina Allen	PDGA
2023	June 1–4	Kristin Tattar	4	$8,500	Sai Ananda	Ohn Scoggins / Juliana Korver	PDGA
2024	May 30 - June 2	Paige Pierce (3)	2	$8,000	Holyn Handley	Sofia Donnecke	PDGA

== MPO Champions ==
Year	Dates	Champion	Margin of victory	Payout	First runner-up	Second runner-up	PDGA
2019	May 25–27	Drew Gibson	0 (playoff)	$3,295	Eagle McMahon	Seppo Paju / Simon Lizotte	PDGA
2021	June 4–6	Eagle McMahon	1	$5,000	Paul McBeth / Ricky Wysocki	X	PDGA
2022	June 2–5	Simon Lizotte	1	$10,000	Garret Gurthie	Isaac Robinson	PDGA
2023	June 1–4	Adam Hammes	0 (playoff)	$12,500	Aaron Gossage	Corey Ellis	PDGA
2024	May 30 - June 2	Gannon Buhr	8	$13,000	Cole Redalen	Ricky Wysocki	PDGA
