= Andrew Fish =

American disc golfer

Andrew Fish is a professional disc golfer, former civil engineer, and collegiate ultimate frisbee player from Baltimore, Maryland. Fish joined the Professional Disc Golf Association in 2013, and became a professional in 2013.

== Professional career ==
Fish was a civil engineer for Baltimore County, Maryland, specializing in environmental engineering and water resources until 2022.

== Professional disc golf career ==
=== College ===
Fish began playing disc golf in college with the Georgia Tech Disc Golf Team, and within a month of beginning to play, he was the best player on the team. During that time, he competed in the 2013 National Collegiate Disc Golf Championship, where he finished in ninth place.

=== Professional ===
In 2022, Fish transitioned to being a full time touring disc golf professional.

Fish's notable wins include, the 2018, 2019, and 2021 Warwick Disc Golf Championship, 2021 New Jersey State Championship, 2018 Stafford Open, 2017 Delaware Disc Golf Challenge, the 2016, 2017, 2018 and 2019 Seneca Creek Soiree, 2019 Firefly Hollow Open, and 2015 Eric Yetter Champions Cup.

From June 2013 to mid 2022, he only missed cashing at a professional tournament twice, at the 2013 Madisonville Open, and the 2015 United States Disc Golf Championship.

Since 2017, alongside Allie Stone, Fish has directed the Women's Open of Maryland.

In 150 career PDGA tournaments, Fish has accumulated 53 wins and $64,783 in winnings.

== Sponsorship and equipment ==
In 2020, Fish resigned with sponsor Discraft for a fifth season with the disc manufacturer, and maintains a bag sponsorship with Upper Park Disc Golf. He commonly carries the following discs in competition:

Drivers

- Thrasher
- Crank
- Flick
- Force
- Nuke OS
- Raptor
- Undertaker (Z)
- Vulture

Midranges

- Comet (ESP)
- Wasp

Putters

- Zone
- Challenger
- Roach (Soft X)

== Ultimate career ==
=== College ===
Fish played college ultimate at Georgia Institute of Technology, beginning in the 2007–08 season, playing for five seasons. As a graduate student, he was named to the Southeast All-Region second team by USA Ultimate in 2012.
