= Geisinger =

Geisinger may refer to:

== Organizations ==
- Geisinger Commonwealth School of Medicine, a private medical school in Pennsylvania
- Geisinger Health System, Pennsylvania based healthcare system

== Places ==
- Geisinger Holy Spirit, a hospital in Camp Hill, Pennsylvania
- Geisinger Medical Center, a hospital in Danville, Pennsylvania

== People ==
Geisinger is a surname. Notable people with the surname include:

- Abigail Geisinger (both 1827), founder of Geisinger Medical Center
- Alex Geisinger (born 1992), American disc golfer
- David Geisinger (1790–1860), United States Navy officer
- Harry Geisinger (1933–2015), American politician
- Joseph Geisinger, American sound engineer
- Justin Geisinger (born 1982), American football player
