= Locastro =

Locastro or LoCastro is a surname. Notable people with the surname include:

- Nikko Locastro (born 1988), American disc golf player
- Tim Locastro (born 1992), American baseball player
