= Steve Brinster =

American professional disc golfer

Steve Brinster (born 1980) is an American professional disc golfer from Warwick, New York, and United States Disc Golf Champion. He joined the Professional Disc Golf Association in 1996 and became a professional in 1997.

== Professional career ==
He won his first tournament as a professional in 1999 at the Warwick Animalfest PDGA C-Tier event.

Brinster won the United States Disc Golf Championship in 2013, his first and only PDGA Major win. He won the Dogwood Crosstown Classic in 2004, his first and only PDGA National Tour Series win. Brinster's 100th career PDGA win came at the 2019 New Jersey Jam.

Brinster has amassed 107 wins and $215,793 in earnings in over twenty years as a professional disc golfer. He is also an accomplished disc golf course designer, having designed 17 courses throughout the mid-Atlantic and northeast regions. He was inducted into the New York Disc Golf Hall of Fame as part of the 2020 class.

== Sponsorship and equipment ==
Brinster is sponsored by Innova Champion Discs on their All Stars Team. He commonly carries the following discs in competition:

Drivers

- Xcaliber (Star)
- Teedevil (Star)
- Wraith (Star)
- Firebird (Champion)
- Teebird (Steve Brinster Tour Series)
- Teebird (Star)
- Leopard (Star)

Midranges

- Roc (KC Pro)
- Mako3 (Champion)

Putters

- Aviar (DX Classic)
- Aviar (KC Pro)
- Aviar (DX)
