= Holly Finley =

American professional disc golfer

- Born: Nashville, TN
- Other name: The Duchess of Disc Golf
- Occupations: Professional Disc Golfer and International Model

Holly Finley is a professional disc golfer who was named the 2013 PDGA Rookie of the Year. Finley is sponsored by Innova Champion Discs. In 2013, Finley was the only woman to compete in the sport's most prestigious event, the United States Disc Golf Championship Performance Edition. She placed seventh and earned an invitation back for the 2014 USDGC Performance Edition.

== Amateur career ==
Finley started playing disc golf in 2011 before moving to Africa for a modeling contract. While in Africa, she decided that competing in tournaments during 2012 would be her goal. Upon returning from Africa, she entered into her 1st tournament and then went on to compete in 27 PDGA sanctioned events that year. She placed fourth at the Amateur Disc Golf World Championship and decided to turn professional the following year. During her amateur career she was awarded Amateur Women's Points leader.

== Professional career ==
Finley competed in 29 sanctioned events during her first season as a professional in 2013. She ranked 7th in the PDGA National Tour Elite Series points standings and played the second most sanctioned events of any professional female disc golfer. Finley was awarded PDGA Rookie of the Year in 2013.
