= Discraft =

Disc golf and ultimate company

Discraft Inc.
- Company type: Private
- Industry: Sport
- Founded: 1979
- Founder: Jim Kenner; Gail McColl
- Headquarters: Wixom, Michigan
- Website: discraft.com

Discraft is a manufacturing company producing flying discs for the sports of ultimate, disc golf, and freestyle founded in 1978 in London, Ontario, Canada. In 1979, Jim Kenner and Gail McColl moved to Michigan and started what is now Discraft Inc. The company sells discs to resellers and wholesalers worldwide.

Discraft's 175-gram Ultra-Star disc is used in various levels of the USA Ultimate Championship Series alongside discs manufactured by Wham-O, Innova, and Daredevil Discs. Discraft also owns and produces discs and other disc golf accessories for the Disc Golf Association.

== Products ==
=== Types of discs ===
Currently, Discraft produces 48 different models of discs used for disc golf. Their production discs are divided into four categories: 10 putters, nine midranges, 10 fairway drivers, and 19 distance drivers.

=== Types of plastic ===
Discraft discs are produced in nine different lines of plastic:

- Ti
- Cryztal FLX Z
- ESP FLX
- Cryztal Elite Z
- ESP
- Elite-Z
- Z-Lite
- Elite-X
- Pro-D
- Soft Pro-D

=== Other products ===
Discraft also sells a variety of disc golf accessories. The major accessories that they sell are disc golf bags, baskets, towels, and apparel. And it also sells products pertinent to Disc Ultimate and Freestyle.

== Team Discraft ==
Discraft sponsors a disc golf team called Team Discraft.

Missy Gannon

Chris Dickerson

Anthony Barela

Adam Hammes

Valerie Mandujano

Ezra Aderhold

Aaron Gossage

Holyn Handley

Andrew Presnell

Ezra Robinson

Ricky Wysocki

Paul McBeth, a six-time PDGA Mixed Open World Champion, joined Team Discraft beginning in 2019. On February 24, 2021, Discraft extended their contract with McBeth, worth $10 million over 10 years.

Paige Pierce joined Team Discraft beginning in the 2020 season. Pierce is a five-time PDGA Women's Open World Champion, with titles in 2011, 2013, 2015, 2017, and 2019.

Paul Ulibarri is the team captain.

On January 17, 2020, Discraft signed YouTube personality and former American Ultimate Disc League player Brodie Smith as he joined the Disc Golf Pro Tour.

Additional team members include Andrew Fish, Chris Dickerson, and Michael Johansen.

== See also ==
- List of disc golf manufacturers
