= Will Schusterick =

American professional disc golfer (born 1992)

Personal information
- Full name: Dudley William Schusterick
- Nickname: Will
- Nationality: United States
- Born: May 4, 1992 (age 34) Reno, Nevada
- Height: 6 ft 2 in (188 cm)
- Spouses: Latricia Gunther of Beckley, W.V.

Sport
- Sport: Disc golf
- Turned pro: 2008

Will Schusterick (/ˈʃuːstərɪk/ SHOO-stə-rik; born May 4, 1992, in Reno, Nevada) is an American professional disc golfer.

Schusterick has won the United States Disc Golf Championship three times. He turned pro in 2008 at the age of 16, and his career earnings are $215,190.29 (as of September 2016).

Schusterick was born in Nevada, but has lived the majority of his life in Knoxville and Nashville, Tennessee. He is currently the CEO and a part-owner of Prodigy Disc.

== Professional career ==
=== Notable wins ===
Year	Tournament	Tier	Stroke Margin	Winning score	Runner up	Prize money
2010	US Disc Golf Championship	M	-2	(61-63-56-64=244)	Nikko Locastro	$12,000
2012	Stockholm Open	M	-4	-24 (55-62-52-59=228)	David Feldberg	$4,050
2012	US Disc Golf Championship	M	-2	-48 (59-57-53-55=224)	Richard Wysocki	$7,500
2013	Memorial Championship	NT	Playoff	-48 (49-42-48-45=184)	Paul McBeth	$3,700
2013	Beaver State Fling	NT	-2	-35 (50-53-51-55=209)	Nathan Doss	$3,600
2014	US Disc Golf Championship	M	Playoff	-19 (62-59-62-66=249)	Paul McBeth	$8,000
2015	St. Jude Disc Golf Charity Invitational	XA	-2	-9 (57-60=117)	Steve Rico	$1,600

Major, NT playoff record (2-1)

Year	Tournament	Opponent(s)	Result
2013	Memorial Championship	Paul McBeth	Won with birdie on first extra hole
2014	US Disc Golf Championship	Paul McBeth, Johne McCray	Won with birdie on second extra hole; McCray eliminated after first extra hole
2015	Beaver State Fling	Paul McBeth	Lost to birdie on third extra hole

=== Summary ===
Competition Tier	Wins	2nd	3rd	Top-5	Top-25	Events
World Championships	0	1	2	4	6	8
Other Majors	4	1	2	10	18	20
National Tour	2	5	4	17	43	51

=== Annual statistics ===
Year	Events	Wins	Top 3	Earnings	$ / Event	Rating^{†}	World Ranking^{†}
2006	2	0	0	$0	$0.00	949	-
2007	8	0	3	$827	$103.38	975	-
2008	33	10	16	$11,041	$334.58	1002	-
2009	20	3	5	$5,753	$287.65	1013	27
2010	32	10	16	$23,976	$749.25	1020	19
2011	39	12	21	$24,957	$639.92	1032	2
2012	35	8	22	$38,089	$1,088.26	1044	1
2013	34	14	25	$33,850	$995.59	1043	3
2014	32	7	18	$27,916	$872.38	1027	8
2015	29	10	20	$31,633	$1,090.79	1027	3
2016	25	3	6	$15,415	$616.60	1013	-
Career	289	77	152	$213,457	$738.61	-	-

^{†}At Year End

== Equipment ==
Schusterick is sponsored by Prodigy Disc. He commonly carries a combination of the following discs:

Distance Drivers

- D1 (400g, 400s)
- D2 (400g)
- D3 (400g)
- D4 (400g)
- X1 (750)

Fairway Drivers

- H1 (750)
- H3 (750)
- F1 (400)
- F2 (400)
- F3 (400s)
- F5 (400)

Midranges

- A2 (400g)
- M2 (200, 750)
- M3 (750)

Putters

- PA1 (300s, 750)
- PA3 (200, 300s, 350g)
- PA4 (200)
