= United States Disc Golf Championship =

Disc golf tournament

The United States Disc Golf Championship is a disc golf tournament held at the Winthrop Gold Course, on the campus of Winthrop University in Rock Hill, South Carolina. The professional event has been held annually as a PDGA sanctioned Major since 1999. Along with the PDGA World Championships, it is one of the most prestigious major tournaments in disc golf. The primary sponsor for the event since its beginnings in 1999 has been Innova Champion Discs, a prominent disc manufacturer. Ken Climo currently holds a record five US Disc Golf Championships. The 2016 USDGC champion, Jeremy "Big Jerm" Koling, was leading the tournament after the third round. He was declared the winner when the fourth round was canceled due to inclement weather produced by Hurricane Matthew.

The 2011 USDGC was played in a different format to the previous twelve events. Each player was assigned a projected score on each hole based on their PDGA Player Rating. The player's official score was how they played in comparison to their projected score. For example, if a player had a projected score of 90 and they finished their round at 81, their official tournament score was a -9. The player with the best official tournament score across all four rounds was John Key who scored -16. Because of the change to the format, Key is often omitted from the list of USDGC Champions.

==USDGC Champions==

Year	Date	Champion	Hometown	Margin of Victory	Payout	First Runner Up	Second Runner Up	Results
1999	October 7–10	Ken Climo	Clearwater, Florida	15	$1,400	Alan Schack	Craig Gangloff	PDGA
2000	October 12–15	Ken Climo (2)	Clearwater, Florida	5	$2,000	Alan Schack	Ron Russell	PDGA
2001	October 11–14	Barry Schultz	Menomonee Falls, Wisconsin	1	$8,000	Ken Climo	Larry Leonard	PDGA
2002	October 17–20	Ken Climo (3)	Clearwater, Florida	6	$8,000	Barry Schultz	Mike Young	PDGA
2003	October 16–19	Barry Schultz (2)	Menomonee Falls, Wisconsin	0 (10 Hole Sudden-Death Playoff)	$10,000	Ken Climo	Scott Martin	PDGA
2004	October 14–17	Ken Climo (4)	Clearwater, Florida	5	$10,000	Darrell Nodland	Cameron Todd	PDGA
2005	October 12–15	David Feldberg	Springfield, Oregon	2	$11,000	Scott Martin	Barry Schultz	PDGA
2006	October 11–14	Barry Schultz (3)	Menomonee Falls, Wisconsin	11	$11,000	Brian Schweberger	Steve Brinster	PDGA
2007	October 3–6	Ken Climo (5)	Clearwater, Florida	11	$15,000	Avery Jenkins	David Feldberg	PDGA
2008	October 12–15	Nathan Doss	Santa Cruz, California	4	$12,000	Avery Jenkins	Ken Climo	PDGA
2009	October 7–10	Nikko Locastro	St. Louis, Missouri	2	$15,000	David Feldberg	Josh Anthon	PDGA
2010	October 6–9	Will Schusterick	Knoxville, Tennessee	2	$12,000	Nikko Locastro	Steve Brinster	PDGA
2012	October 3–6	Will Schusterick (2)	Knoxville, Tennessee	2	$7,500	Richard Wysocki	Josh Anthon	PDGA
2013	October 2–5	Steve Brinster	Warwick, New York	1	$7,500	Barry Schultz	Steve Rico	PDGA
2014	October 1–4	Will Schusterick (3)	Knoxville, Tennessee	0 (2 Hole Sudden-Death Playoff)	$8,000	Paul McBeth	John McCray	PDGA
2015	October 7–10	Paul McBeth	Huntington Beach, California	5	$8,000	Richard Wysocki	Nathan Doss	PDGA
2016	October 5–8*	Jeremy Koling	Charlotte, North Carolina	4	$10,000	Nikko Locastro	Richard Wysocki	PDGA
2017	October 4–7	Nathan Sexton	Corvallis, Oregon	5	$12,000	Richard Wysocki	Paul McBeth	PDGA
2018	October 3–6	Paul McBeth (2)	Huntington Beach, California	3	$10,000	James Conrad	Kevin Jones	PDGA
2019	October 2–5	James Conrad	Blacksburg, Virginia	1	$12,000	Jeremy Koling	Nikko Locastro	PDGA
2020	October 7–10	Chris Dickerson	Limestone, Tennessee	1	$10,000	Calvin Heimburg	Richard Wysocki	PDGA
2021	October 6-9	Paul McBeth (3)	Huntington Beach, California	0 (1 Hole Sudden-Death Playoff)	$20,000	Kyle Klein	Richard Wysocki	PDGA
2022	October 6-9	Gannon Buhr	Urbandale, Iowa	1	$25,000	Niklas Anttila	Calvin Heimburg	PDGA
2023	October 5-8	Kyle Klein	Wyoming, Michigan	1	$30,000	Bradley Williams	Isaac Robinson	PDGA
2024	October 10-13	Gannon Buhr (2)	Urbandale, Iowa	2	$30,000	Calvin Heimburg	Anthony Barela	PDGA
2025	October 9-12	Anthony Barela	Mesa, Arizona	4	$25,000	Richard Wysocki	Paul McBeth	PDGA
2026	October 8-11	Calvin Heimburg	Safety Harbor, Florida	2	$25,000	Richard Wysocki	Gannon Buhr	PDGA
