= Nathan Sexton =

American professional disc golfer

Personal information
- Nationality: United States
- Born: May 4, 1985 (age 41) Corvallis, Oregon
- Height: 6 ft 0 in (183 cm)
- Weight: 200 lb (91 kg)

Sport
- Sport: Disc golf
- Turned pro: 2004

Nathan Sexton is an American professional disc golfer currently sponsored by Innova Champion Discs. Among his most notable accomplishments are his 2003 Junior I Boys PDGA World Championship and his 2017 United States Disc Golf Championship win, which is his first PDGA Major title as a professional. He registered as a professional with the PDGA in 2004, but has only been touring full-time since 2013.

In addition to playing disc golf, Nate has been doing commentary for Jomez Productions with Jeremy Koling and Paul Ulibarri.

== Professional career ==
=== Notable wins ===
Year	Tournament	Tier	Stroke Margin	Winning score	Runner up	Prize money
2003	PDGA Junior Disc Golf World Championships	M	-10	(50-50-44-52-46-54-59=355)	Caleb Wood	-
2017	United States Disc Golf Championship	M	-5	-34 (59-58-57-58=232)	Richard Wysocki	$12,000
2018	Canadian Disc Golf Championships	A	-2	-27 (59-46-48=163)	Chandler Fry	$1,229
2018	Discraft Ledgestone Insurance Open	A	-2	-28 (56-59-56-53=224)	Chris Dickerson	$7,000
2019	Innova Baltic Tour - Alutaguse Open	A	-6	-38 (54-49-51=154)	Albert Tamm	$1,126
2020	Las Vegas Challenge	A	-2	-44 (45-50-53-50=198)	Garrett Gurthie	$4,000

=== Summary ===
Competition Tier	Wins	2nd	3rd	Top-5	Top-25	Events*
World Championships	0	0	1	2	6	9
Other Majors	1	0	0	5	15	21
National Tour	0	2	3	10	42	48
A-Tier Events	6	5	9	31	47	48

*Through February 2020

=== Annual statistics ===
Year	Events	Wins	Top 3	Earnings	$ / Event	Rating^{†}	World; Rankings^{†}
2004	2	0	1	$565	$282.50	973	-
2005	15	4	9	$3,504	$233.63	1015	41
2006	15	3	7	$3,106	$207.07	1002	85
2007	24	8	15	$7,421	$309.23	1007	38
2008	29	10	16	$9,669	$333.43	1019	31
2009	32	9	23	$11,252	$351.63	1019	25
2010	26	6	15	$10,905	$419.42	1021	26
2011	21	8	9	$6,206	$295.55	1021	37
2012	12	6	8	$5,144	$428.67	1035	-
2013	11	5	8	$4,670	$424.54	1035	19
2014	30	12	24	$15,262	$508.73	1031	12
2015	23	2	5	$17,172	$746.63	1027	8
2016	19	1	7	$21,044	$1,107.60	1034	12
2017	18	2	8	$31,255	$1,736.39	1035	4
2018	18	2	4	$26,570	$1476.11	1034	11
2019	13	2	3	$14,040	$1080.00	1035	12
2020	6	3	4	$7,135	$1,189	1042	-
2021*	10	0	2	$15,412	$1,541	-	
Career	314	87	168	$191,788.29	$637.17	-	-

^{†}At Year End
*Through August 2021

== Equipment ==
Sexton is sponsored by Innova Champion Discs. He commonly carries the following discs in competition:

Drivers

- Destroyer (Star)
- PFN Xcaliber (Echo Star)
- Wraith (Star)
- Sidewinder (Star)
- Thunderbird (Champion)
- Sexton Firebird (Glow Champion)
- PFN Orc (Champion)*
- Teebird (Star)
- Teebird3 (Metal Flake)
- Leopard3 (Star)

Midranges

- Roc (KC Pro)
- Roc3 (Metal Flake)
- Caiman (Star)
- Mako3 (Star)
- Lion (Champion)
- Rat (Star)

Putters

- Dart (R-Pro)
- Aviar (DX)
- Firefly (Nexus)

* PFN is an abbreviation for "Pre Flight Number". Innova began printing flight rating numbers on their discs in 2009. PFN discs were manufactured before that time.
