= Ken Climo =

American disc golfer

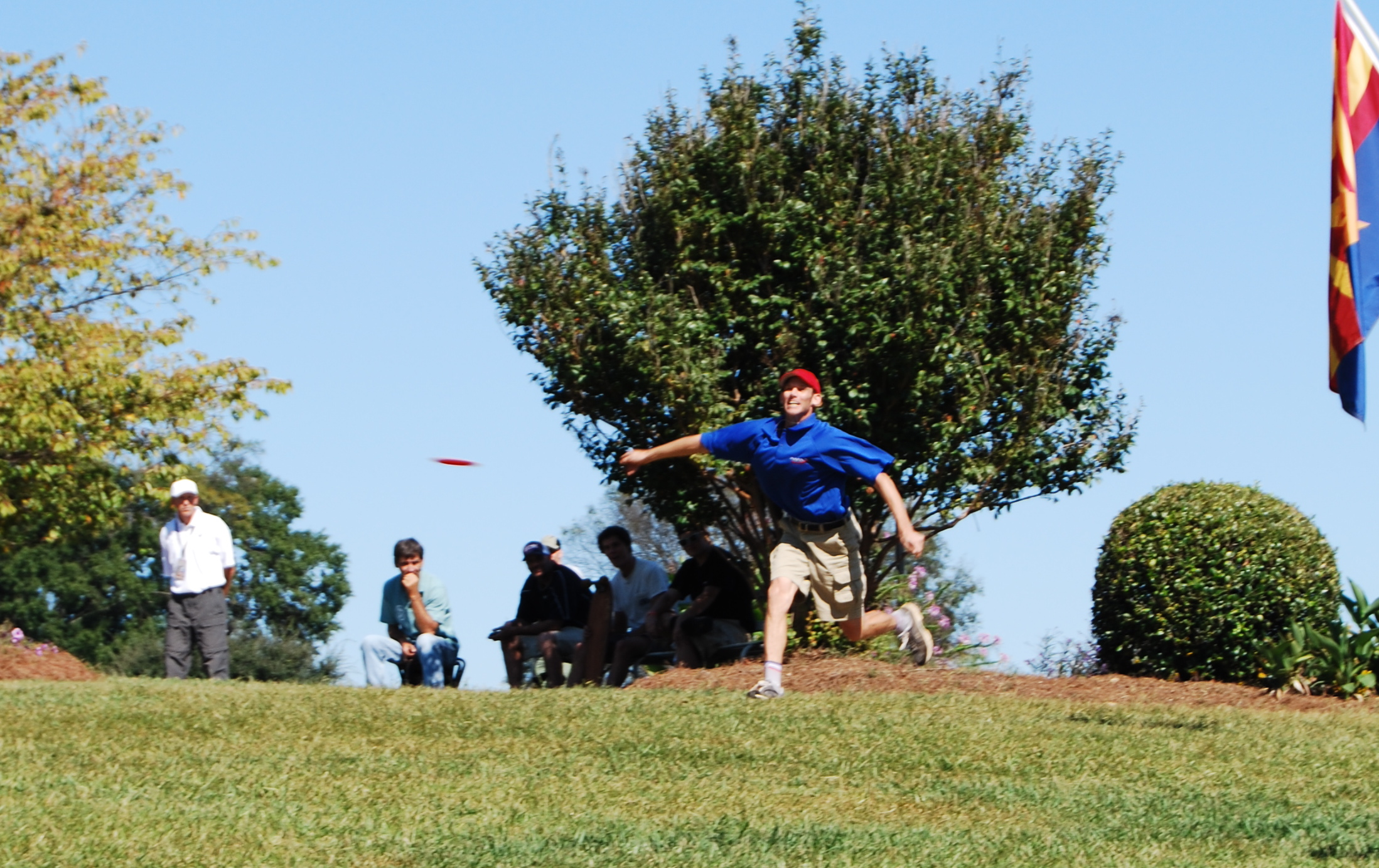
- Ken Klimo teeing off at hole 5 of the USDGC 2008.

Personal information
- Nationality: United States

Sport
- Sport: Disc golf
- Turned pro: 1988

Ken "The Champ" Climo is an American professional disc golfer. He claimed twelve PDGA World Championship titles, including nine in as many years from 1990 to 1998. The only other golfers to achieve multiple World titles are Harold Duvall (1982, 1985), Barry Schultz (2003–2004), Nate Doss (2005, 2007, 2011), Paul McBeth (2012–2015, 2019, 2022), Richard Wysocki (2016, 2017) and Isaac Robinson (2023, 2024). In addition to his world titles, Climo has an unequalled record in the United States Disc Golf Championship (the premier event in the game), earning five titles (1999, 2000, 2002, 2004, 2007). Named PDGA player of the year seven times, Ken Climo was inducted into the PDGA Hall of Fame in 1995.

He competed in the World Championships masters division for the first time in 2012, at the age of 44, and won by a large margin, securing his 13th world championship title. He has added two more masters world titles to his resume since then (2014, 2015).

During his three decades in the PDGA, Climo has notched 103 aces.

Climo, with Innova Discs, has created his own special blend of plastic, known as KC Pro. Several popular disc molds are available in KC Pro, including the Aviar and Roc. Climo spent 26 years as an Innova sponsored player before launching his own brand, Climo Disc Golf in January 2025. His departure from the brand was announced on November 27, 2024.

== Professional career ==
=== Open division ===
Climo has 221 wins in the Open Division, the most all-time, including 12 World Championships and 5 US Championships.

==== PDGA Pro World Championships (12) ====
Year	Location	Stroke Margin	Winning score	Runner up	Prize money
1990	Scottsdale/Mesa/Fountain Hills, AZ	−1	(43–47–43–47–45–45–45–46–46–45=452)	Sam Grizzaffi	$2,042
1991	Dayton, OH	−10	(45–48–48–49–48–42–41=321)	Eric Marx	$2,700
1992	Detroit, MI	−9	(44–43–46–41–53–47–45–42–52–29=442)	Crazy John Brooks	$3,500
1993	Huntsville, AL	−4	(47–44–45–46–43–45–50–45–44–25=434)	Dean Tannock	$2,539
1994	Port Arthur, TX	−18	(47–60–47–45–42–45–46–54–50–27=463)	Joe Mela	$2,500
1995	Port Arthur, TX	−4	(46–50–41–50–41–45–47–53–48–27=448)	Mike Randolph	$2,350
1996	South Bend, IN	−3	(48–49–48–40–51–49–44–42–41–20=432)	Geoff Lissaman	$3,600
1997	Charlotte, NC	−7	(45–50–48–47–47–46–49–46–49–23=450)	Scott Stokely	$3,000
1998	Cincinnati, OH	−4	(47–46–47–49–48–47–48–46–26=404)	Scott Stokely	$3,581
2000	Ann Arbor, MI	−8	(62–61–60–45–50–49–61–25=413)	Barry Schultz	$7,303
2002	Houston, TX	−14	(51–47–44–52–48–45–43–46–46–25=447)	Barry Schultz	$4,500
2006	Augusta, GA	−5	(51–50–45–45–65–47–46–23=372)	Nate Doss	$5,500

==== Other majors (8) ====
Year	Tournament	Stroke Margin	Winning score	Runner up	Prize money
1993	Japan Open	−13	(43–44–44–43–44–21–26=265)	'Crazy' John Brooks	$4,350
1994	Japan Open	−12	(47–45–49–45–47–21–22=276)	Marcus Cisneros	$4,350
1995	Japan Open	−10	(47–45–45–48–46–29–27=287)	John Ahart	$4,350
1999	US Disc Golf Championships	−15	(51–50–49–54=204)	Alan Schack	$1,400
2000	US Disc Golf Championships	−5	( 59–55–54–58=226)	Alan Schack	$2,000
2002	US Disc Golf Championships	−6	(60–58–59–60=237)	Barry Schultz	$8,000
2004	US Disc Golf Championships	−5	(56–66–69–64=255)	Cameron Todd/Darrell Nodland	$10,000
2007	European Open	−8	(50–54–50–51=205)	David Feldberg	$5,480
2007	US Disc Golf Championships	−11	(63–58–56–56=233)	Avery Jenkins	$15,000

Major playoff record (0–1)

Year	Tournament	Opponent	Result
2003	US Disc Golf Championships	Barry Schultz	Lost to birdie on tenth extra hole

==== National tour (14) ====
Year	Tournament	Stroke Margin	Winning score	Runner up	Prize money
2003	Bell South Open	−3	(45–47–47–41–27=207)	Barry Schultz	$2,500
2004	Bell South Open	−3	(43–47–49–43–26=208)	Keith Warren	$2,500
2004	Masters Cup	−5	(77–75–70–27=249)	Barry Schultz/David Feldberg	$2,500
2005	Golden State Classic	−1	(57–55–61–57–32=262)	Barry Schultz/David Feldberg	$1,500
2005	Greater Des Moines Challenge	−8	(52–48–44–51=195)	Coda Hatfield	$1,500
2005	Skylands Classic	Playoff	(44–59–51–52=206)	Steve Brinster	$2,100
2006	Melbourne Open	−4	(64–67–68–26=225)	Johne McCray	$1,500
2006	Masters Cup	−11	(76–72–67=215)	Steve Rico	$2,000
2007	Bowling Green Open	−1	(43–49–48–47–25=212)	Coda Hatfield	$2,000
2007	Golden State Classic	−3	(53–54–64=171)	Matthew Orum	$1,750
2009	Atlanta Open	−4	(50–50–55–62=217)	Barry Schultz	$1,700
2009	Beaver State Fling	−7	(54–51–51–52=208)	Avery Jenkins	$2,850
2010	Sunshine State Shootout	Playoff	(62–74–65=201)	Nathan Doss	$1,250
2010	Masters Cup	Playoff	(78–72–71=221)	Bradley Williams	$1,840

NT playoff record (3–0)

Year	Tournament	Opponent	Result
2005	Skylands Classic	Steve Brinster	Won on second extra hole
2010	Sunshine State Classic	Nathan Doss	Won with birdie on first extra hole
2010	Masters Cup	Bradley Williams	Won with par on first extra hole

==== Summary ====
Competition Tier	Wins	2nd	3rd	Top-5	Top-25	Events
World Championships	12	2	0	16	22	22
Other Majors	8	5	1	18	31	33
National Tour	14	6	6	43	65	65

==== Annual statistics ====
Year	Events	Wins	Top 3	Earnings	$ / Event	Rating
1988	7	1	3	$408	$58.29	x
1989	11	4	6	$2,173	$197.55	x
1990	15	9	13	$6,996	$499.71	x
1991	8	4	6	$4,917	$614.63	x
1992	23	14	23	$10,667	$463.78	x
1993	15	12	14	$12,660	$844.00	x
1994	17	11	17	$11,105	$653.24	x
1995	26	23	26	$19,107	$734.88	x
1996	21	16	19	$12,523	$596.33	x
1997	21	14	19	$13,599	$647.57	x
1998	22	13	19	$17,812	$809.64	1032
1999	20	15	19	$22,426	$1,121.30	1033
2000	19	12	17	$22,096	$1,162.95	1035
2001	19	8	15	$17,110	$900.53	1031
2002	18	6	14	$30,597	$1,699.83	1044
2003	12	3	7	$14,121	$1,176.75	1036
2004	16	5	11	$26,520	$1,657.50	1033
2005	16	4	10	$17,080	$1,067.50	1037
2006	19	8	11	$22,687	$1,194.05	1041
2007	21	10	15	$39,210	$1,867.14	1038
2008	15	4	8	$13,552	$903.47	1032
2009	17	7	10	$14,748	$867.53	1036
2010	19	6	13	$19,010	$1,000.53	1039
2011	12	2	4	$5,580	$465.00	1037
2012	12	3	7	$8,265	$688.75	1039
2013	9	2	4	$2,461	$273.44	1026
2014	6	2	4	$4,647	$774.50	1031
2015	8	1	5	$5,195	$649.38	1026
2016	5	2	3	$1,460	$292.00	1024
2017	1	0	0	$285	$285	1024
Career	448	221	341	$398,732	$890.03	x

=== Masters division ===
Although eligible for the Masters Division in 2008 when he turned 40, Climo played his first Masters event in 2012, when he won the World Championships. He has won two additional World Championships since then (2014, 2015), bringing his total (including Open Division) to 15.

==== PDGA Masters World Championships(3) ====
Year	Location	Stroke Margin	Winning score	Runner up	Prize money
2012	Charlotte, NC	−9	(55–46–59–51–52–60–46–26=395)	Barry Schultz	$3,500
2014	Portland, OR	−1	(54–54–56–60–53–53–63–31=424)	Barry Schultz	$2,500
2015	Pittsburgh, PA	−3	(56–57–64–57–60–56–27=377)	Patrick Brown	$2,400

==== National tour (6) ====
Year	Tournament	Stroke Margin	Winning score	Runner up	Prize money
2013	Memorial Championship	−9	(55–52–50–47=204)	Jonathan Baldwin/Phil Arthur/Rex Rogers	$1,500
2013	Beaver State Fling	−10	(54–54–52–54=214)	Patrick Brown	$1,500
2014	Memorial Championship	−3	(57–49–50–49=205)	Patrick Brown	$1,500
2015	Memorial Championship	−9	(49–49–52–52=202)	Patrick Brown	$1,600
2016	Memorial Championship	−7	(50–49–48–45=192)	Patrick Brown	$1,600
2016	Beaver State Fling	Playoff	(57–58–56–57=228)	Patrick Brown	$1,250

NT playoff record (1–0)

Year	Tournament	Opponent	Result
2016	Beaver State Fling	Patrick Brown	Won with birdie on first extra hole

==== Summary ====
Competition Tier	Wins	2nd	3rd	Top-5	Top-25	Events
World Championships	3	1	0	5	5	5
Other Majors	0	0	1	4	5	5
National Tour	6	1	0	8	8	8

==== Annual statistics ====
Year	Events	Wins	Top 3	Earnings	$ / Event	Rating
2010	1	0	1	$1,200	$1,200	1039
2012	2	1	1	$4,325	$2,162.50	1039
2013	5	2	3	$6,325	$1,265.00	1026
2014	3	2	2	$5,000	$1,666.67	1031
2015	4	2	3	$5,450	$1,362.50	1026
2016	3	2	2	$3,850	$1,283.33	1022
Career	18	10	12	$26,150	$1,452.78	x

== Equipment ==
Climo has been sponsored by Innova Champion discs throughout his career. He has a number of past and current signature discs (marked with *) and carries a combination of the following discs in competition:

Drivers

- Boss (Champion)
- Destroyer (Pro, Star)
- Firebird (Champion)*
- Katana (Echo Star)
- Starfire (Pro)
- Tern (Champion)*
- Wraith (Pro, Star)*
- XCaliber (Echo Star)

Fairway Drivers

- Banshee (Champion)
- Eagle (Champion)*
- TeeBird (Champion, KC Pro)*
- TL (Champion)
- Sidewinder (Champion)

Midranges

- Roc (KC Pro)*

Putters

- Aviar (KC Pro)*

Climo's other signature discs have included: Cheetah, Cobra, Gazelle, Pegasus, Polaris LS, Raven, Scorpion, Stingray, Viper, Vulcan, Whippet, XD
