= Barry Schultz =

American disc golfer

Personal information
- Nationality: United States
- Born: 1970 (age 55–56) Menomonee Falls, WI

Sport
- Sport: Disc golf

Achievements and titles
- World finals: Won: Open: 2003, 2004 Masters: 2013, 2017
Medal record
Men's disc golf
Representing the United States
World Games
Gold medal – first place	2001 Akita	Men's individual

Barry Schultz is a professional disc golfer based in Charlotte, North Carolina. He has played disc golf since the early 1980s, and has been a professional since 1992. He is on the Innova Champion Discs Hall of Fame Team. For a number of years, he was one of the most dominant players on tour. From 2003-2009, he held the single season earnings record of $40,896, which was finally surpassed by Nikko Locastro in 2010. He is one of six men to win more than one World Championship. He is also a three time United States Disc Golf Champion, one of only four people who have won the event more than once, the others being Ken Climo, Will Schusterick and Paul McBeth. Schultz additionally holds two Masters World Championships. He and Climo are the only two men to earn both an Open and Masters world title. Schultz was inducted into the PDGA Hall of Fame in 2013.

== Professional career ==
=== Open Division ===
As of January, 2017, Schultz has 198 professional wins in the Open Division, including two World Championships and three US Championships. He was the second person to ever win both Championships in the same year (after Climo). Schultz has 17 National Tour (NT) wins, and was the National Tour Series Champion in 2006.

==== 2003 season ====
Schultz's best season was 2003, during which he won 17 out of 29 tournaments and finished in the top three in 5 more of them. He won both the World Championships and the United States Disc Golf Championship, becoming the second player to win both in the same year. In addition, he won two National Tour stops and four A-Tier tournaments. He also finished the year with his highest career player rating, 1039.

==== Major wins (5) ====
Year	Tournament	Stroke Margin	Winning score	Runner up	Prize money
2001	US Disc Golf Championships	-1	(58-58-64-65=245)	Ken Climo	$8,000
2003	PDGA Pro World Championships	-6	(45-49-67-48-49-48-50-27=383)	Markus Kallstrom	$5,000
2003	US Disc Golf Championships	Playoff	(65-60-58-60=243)	Ken Climo	$10,000
2004	PDGA Pro World Championships	-9	(41-53-55-55-42-54-43-51-49-28=471)	Ken Climo	$5,300
2006	US Disc Golf Championships	-11	(58-57-58-63=236)	Brian Schweberger	$11,000

Major playoff record (1-0)

Year	Tournament	Opponent	Result
2003	US Disc Golf Championships	Ken Climo	Won with birdie on tenth extra hole

==== National Tour wins (17) ====
Year	Tournament	Stroke Margin	Winning score	Runner up	Prize money
2003	Memorial Championship	-10	(51-73-43-25=192)	Brian McRee	$2,400
2003	Melbourne Open	-5	(64-64-64-28=220)	Walter Haney	$1,600
2003	Great Lakes Open	Playoff	(68-59-70-27=224)	Steve Rico	$2,125
2003	Mad City Open	-2	(49-47-53-25=174)	Brian Schweberger	$1,500
2004	Melbourne Open	-2	(68-63-60-24=215)	Cameron Todd	$2,000
2004	Brent Hambrick Memorial Open	-5	(73-76-44-27=220)	Ron Russell	$2,290
2004	Minnesota Majestic	-3	(67-68-62-29=226)	Timmy Gill	$1,890
2005	Memorial Championship	-4	(68-72-64=204)	David Feldberg	$2,600
2005	Melbourne Open	-3	(76-74-73-26=249)	Steve Brinster/Peter Middlecamp	$1,800
2005	Beaver State Fling	-1	(55-54-53=162)	David Feldberg	$1,865
2006	Memorial Championship	-4	(58-44-55=157)	Chris Sprague	$2,800
2006	Bowling Green Open	-8	(48-45-47-44-23=207)	Justin Bunnell	$2,500
2006	Texas State Championships	-1	(50-48-81=179)	Kevin McCoy/Matthew Orum	$1,500
2006	Beaver State Fling	-5	(53-54-55-48=210)	David Feldberg/Steve Rico	$1,345
2008	Bowling Green Open	-4	(48-47-47-49-22=213)	Eric McCabe	$2,000
2008	Minnesota Majestic	-1	(74-73-71-29=247)	David Feldberg	$2,500
2009	Vibram Open	-7	(49-57-55=161)	Nikko Locastro	$2,500

NT playoff record (1-1)

Year	Tournament	Opponent	Result
2003	Great Lakes Open	Steve Rico	Won
2004	Memorial Championships	Timmy Gill	Lost

==== Summary ====
Competition Tier	Wins	2nd	3rd	Top-5	Top-25	Events
World Championships	2	3	1	9	17	19
Other Majors	3	2	2	8	21	22
National Tour	17	11	4	40	54	57

==== Annual statistics ====
Year	Events	Wins	Top 3	Earnings	$ / Event	Rating
1992	2	0	0	$0	$0.00	x
1993	5	0	0	$200	$40.00	x
1994	5	1	1	$410	$82.00	x
1995	9	1	5	$1,175	$130.56	x
1996	12	2	7	$2,795	$232.92	x
1997	14	7	11	$4,750	$339.29	x
1998	17	6	11	$6,712	$394.82	1012
1999	16	7	11	$12,106	$756.63	1023
2000	17	6	11	$16,307	$959.24	1021
2001	24	8	16	$21,365	$890.21	1023
2002	28	7	16	$24,303	$867.96	1030
2003	26	17	22	$39,851	$1,532.73	1039
2004	35	21	28	$37,488	$1,071.09	1036
2005	30	13	23	$26,679	$889.30	1032
2006	29	10	23	$37,356	$1,288.14	1038
2007	21	6	11	$10,814	$514.95	1030
2008	25	9	17	$22,285	$891.40	1031
2009	20	6	13	$14,070	$703.50	1034
2010	14	4	6	$7,145	$510.36	1029
2011	18	5	8	$9,142	$507.89	1028
2012	10	5	6	$3,135	$313.50	1025
2013	27	14	24	$12,797	$473.96	1034
2014	21	11	19	$6,085	$289.76	1030
2015	29	19	24	$11,050	$381.03	1025
2016	19	13	16	$9,948	$523.58	1033
Career	473	198	329	$337,968	$714.52	x

=== Masters Division ===
==== Major wins ====
Year	Tournament	Stroke Margin	Winning score	Runner up	Prize money
2010	US Masters Championship	Playoff	(49-64-54-63=230)	Patrick Brown	$2,000
2011	US Masters Championship	-12	-27 (78-74-62=214)	Patrick Brown	$1,700
2012	US Masters Championship	-5	-37 (75-50-46=171)	Johne McCray	$2,650
2013	PDGA World Championships	-11	-78 (55-49-57-51-57-53-46-31=399)	Ken Climo	$2,000
2014	US Masters Championship	-7	-47 (48-49-50-54-50-31=282)	Johne McCray	$2,100
2015	US Masters Championship	-6	-57 (55-51-45-41-53=245)	Kevin McCoy	$2,000
2017	PDGA Pro Masters World Championships	-4	-64 (58-51-46-57-52-53-48-26=39)	Robert Bainbridge	$2,350
2017	US Masters Championship	-5	-44 (51-44-50-48=193)	Joe Rovere	$1,800
2019	US Masters Championship	-3	-22 (56-48-47-58=209)	Michael Johansen	

Major playoff record (1-0)

Year	Tournament	Opponent	Result
2010	US Masters Championships	Patrick Brown	Won with birdie on first extra hole

==== Summary ====
Competition Tier	Wins	2nd	3rd	Top-5	Events
World Championships	1	2	0	3	3
Masters World Championships	1	0	0	1	1
Masters Championships	6	0	0	6	7

==== Annual statistics ====
Year	Events	Wins	Top 3	Earnings	$ / Event	Rating
2010	1	1	1	$2,000	$2,000.00	1029
2011	1	1	1	$1,700	$1,700.00	1028
2012	11	7	11	$7,526	$684.18	1025
2013	4	2	3	$3,205	$801.25	1034
2014	3	2	3	$4,075	$1,358.33	1030
2015	3	3	3	$2,545	$848.33	1025
2016	1	1	1	$350	$350.00	1033
Career	24	18	23	$21,401	$891.71	x

== Equipment ==
Schultz is sponsored by Innova Champion Discs. He has a number of signature discs (marked with *), and commonly carries the following discs during competition:

Drivers

- Beast (Champion)*
- Boss (Champion, Pro, Star)
- Firebird (Champion, Star)
- Roadrunner (Champion)
- SL (Pro)
- Valkyrie (DX)
- Wraith (Pro)

Fairway Drivers

- Leopard (Champion, Pro)*
- TeeBird (Metal Flake)
- TL (Champion)

Midranges

- Roc (DX, KC Pro)
- Shark (DX)

Putters

- Aviar (DX, KC Pro)
