= Simon Lizotte =

German professional disc golfer (born 1992)

Personal information
- Nationality: Germany Canada
- Born: November 17, 1992 (age 33) Bremen, Germany
- Children: 2

Sport
- Sport: Disc golf
- Turned pro: 2008

Simon Lizotte (born November 17, 1992) is a professional disc golfer based in Shrewsbury, Massachusetts, United States. Lizotte was born in Bremen, Germany but also holds Canadian citizenship through his father.

He has won seven Elite Series titles in the last three seasons on the Disc Golf Pro Tour, with career tournament winnings of over $300,000. 2022 was his most successful season to date, with four Elite Series wins, as well as five other top ten finishes.

In January 2023 he signed a ten-year sponsorship deal with MVP Discs, reported to be worth more than $1M per year; for the previous ten years he had been sponsored by Discmania Discs.

Lizotte has acquired a significant following for his disc golf-related videos on YouTube, reaching 200,000 subscribers in early 2024. He is also noted for holding the disc golf distance world record on several occasions.

== Professional career ==
=== National Tour/DGPT Elite Series wins (8) ===
| No. | Date | Tournament | Winning score | To par | Margin of victory | Runner(s)-up |
|---|---|---|---|---|---|---|
| 1 | August 23, 2015 | Ledgestone Insurance Open | 54-47-47-53-32=233 | −32 | 4 strokes | (United States) Paul McBeth |
| 2 | May 20–22, 2022 | OTB Open | 62-58-58=178 | −20 | 2 strokes | (United States) Calvin Heimburg |
| 3 | June 2–5, 2022 | Portland Open | 55-58-58-59=230 | −34 | 1 stroke | (United States) Garrett Gurthie |
| 4 | August 19–21, 2022 | TruBank Des Moines Challenge | 54-57-54=165 | −27 | Playoff | (United States) Robert Burridge |
| 5 | September 22–25, 2022 | MVP Open at Maple Hill | 62-52-50=164 | −16 | 1 stroke | (United States) Corey Ellis |
| 6 | April 7–9, 2023 | Music City Open | 59-59-54=172 | −23 | 1 stroke | (United States) Anthony Barela |
| 7 | August 17–20, 2023 | Discraft Great Lakes Open | 60-61-54-55=230 | −30 | 3 strokes | (United States) Eagle McMahon |
| 8 | April 19–21, 2024 | Music City Open | 59-55-57=171 | −30 | 5 strokes | (United States) Paul McBeth |

=== A-Tier wins (9) ===
| No. | Date | Tournament | Winning score | To par | Margin of victory | Runner(s)-up |
|---|---|---|---|---|---|---|
| 1 | August 18, 2012 | European Championships | 54-58-58-61=231 | −33 | 3 strokes | (Denmark) Karl Nybo |
| 2 | May 14, 2014 | Dynamic Discs Glass Blown Open | 50-49-52=151 | −36 | 5 strokes | (United States) Paul McBeth, (United States) Jeremy Koling |
| 3 | April 24, 2016 | Nick Hyde Memorial | 51-54-54=159 | −30 | Playoff | (United States) Paul McBeth, (United States) Nate Sexton |
| 4 | May 7, 2016 | Konopiste Open | 55-57-57=169 | | Playoff | (United States) Paul McBeth, (Denmark) Karl Nybo |
| 5 | March 26, 2017 | The Open at Temple | 55-57-52=164 | −25 | 5 strokes | (United States) Nikko Locastro, (United States) James Conrad |
| 6 | March 3, 2018 | Memorial Championship | 47-49-42-51=189 | −39 | 3 strokes | (United States) Eagle McMahon |
| 7 | June 3, 2018 | Battle of Seattle 5 | 52-46-58-28=184 | | 2 strokes | (United States) Kevin Jones |
| 8 | August 19, 2018 | European Disc Golf Championships | 53-50-51-54=208 | −32 | 5 strokes | (Finland) Seppo Paju |
| 9 | May 9-11, 2025 | Cosmic Open at Maple Hill | 57-57-61=175 | −5 | 10 strokes | (United States) Landon Brooks |

=== World distance records ===
Lizotte set the world record for longest throw of a disc golf disc on October 25, 2014, at 863.5 ft (263.2 m). This beat David Wiggins Jr.'s previous record of 836 ft set in 2012. Lizotte broke his own record on March 27, 2016, with a throw of 903.9 ft (275.5 m), a record that stood for two days until Wiggins Jr. threw for 1,108.9 ft (338 m). Lizotte then set a personal record of 1030 ft.

Wind has played a significant role in world distance records. Wiggins' 2012 record was set with a 14.5 mph tailwind, while Lizotte's 2014 record was aided by an 18 mph tailwind. His 903.9 ft throw took place in a 30 mph wind, and the two players' throws over 1,000 ft were in a 38-42 mph wind. Both Lizotte and Wiggins have stated that new distance records must be established with wind limits.

=== Summary ===
| Competition Tier | Wins | 2nd | 3rd | Top-5 | Top-25 | Events* |
|---|---|---|---|---|---|---|
| World Championships | 0 | 0 | 1 | 1 | 10 | 10 |
| Other Majors | 0 | 2 | 2 | 5 | 24 | 31 |
| National Tour | 1 | 5 | 3 | 16 | 28 | 33 |
| Pro Tour Elite Series | 7 | 4 | 1 | 17 | 37 | 54 |

*Through December 2025

== Career summary ==
| Season | Starts | Wins | Top-10 | Earnings ($) |
|---|---|---|---|---|
| 2008 | 8 | 1 | 8 | 1,285 |
| 2009 | 9 | 4 | 6 | 2,216 |
| 2010 | 15 | 9 | 13 | 4,428 |
| 2011 | 7 | 2 | 7 | 1,912 |
| 2012 | 9 | 7 | 8 | 1,777 |
| 2013 | 25 | 17 | 22 | 7,021 |
| 2014 | 21 | 4 | 18 | 17,759 |
| 2015 | 26 | 8 | 20 | 24,090 |
| 2016 | 12 | 3 | 12 | 12,029 |
| 2017 | 22 | 3 | 19 | 28,762 |
| 2018 | 20 | 3 | 14 | 22,340 |
| 2019 | 26 | 1 | 21 | 26,132 |
| 2020 | 14 | 3 | 10 | 12,146 |
| 2021 | 12 | 0 | 4 | 8,586 |
| 2022 | 17 | 4 | 9 | 64,467 |
| 2023 | 18 | 4 | 9 | 60,632 |
| 2024 | 19 | 2 | 9 | 32,603 |
| 2025 | 24 | 1 | 12 | 30,660 |
| Career* | 297 | 83 | 221 | 358,750.04 |

*As of 1/7/2026

== Equipment ==
Bags

- James Conrad Signature Edition Voyager

MVP/Axiom Discs

- Distance Drivers:
  - Wave (Neutron)
  - Defy (Neutron)
  - Panic (Neutron)
  - Delirium (Neutron)
  - Dimension (Neutron)
- Fairway Drivers:
  - Fireball (Neutron)
  - Terra (Neutron)
  - Tesla (Proton)
  - Crave (Cosmic Neutron)
- Midranges:
  - Deflector (Neutron)
  - Pyro (Prism Proton)
  - Matrix (Cosmic Neutron)
  - Hex (Neutron)
  - Hex (Proton)
- Putters:
  - Pixel (Electron)
  - Glitch (Neutron Soft)
  - Proxy (Neutron Soft)
  - Spin (Neutron)

== Signature Discs ==
Lizotte was sponsored by Grip Equipment and had a signature bag. From 2013 to 2022, Lizotte had a sponsorship contract with Discmania Discs originally slated to end in 2026. With Discmania, Lizotte helped produce a number of signature series discs, including three in the Creator Series. On January 12, 2023, Lizotte and MVP Disc Sports announced that Lizotte had signed a 10-year sponsor contract, which included a buyout of his Discmania contract. Lizotte announced on August 30, 2023, the creation of a new line of discs with MVP Disc Sports called SimonLine.

Grip Equipment:

- Grip EQ Simon Lizotte Signature Series AX5

Discmania:

- Sky God 1, C-Line P2
- Sky God 2, Swirly S-Line P2
- Sky God 3, Color Glow C-Line P2
- Sky God 4, C-Line P2
- Doombird 1, Swirly S-Line FD3
- Doombird 2, Swirly S-Line FD3
- Doombird 3, Swirly S-Line FD3
- Doombird 4, Horizon FD3
- Crescent Falcon 1, Glow C-Line MD4
- Crescent Falcon 2, Glow C-Line MD4
- Sky Rider, Swirly S-Line PD2
- Mind Bender, Metal Flake C-Line MD1
- Shadow Titan, Forge Method

Discmania Creator Series:

- Tilt, Hard Exo Vapor
- Tilt, Meta
- Full Tilt, Lux Vapor

MVP:

- Official Team Series Leapin' Lizottl, Eclipse Hex
- Trick-or-Treating Leapin' Lizottl, Total Eclipse Hex

MVP SimonLine Series:

- Time-Lapse, Neutron
- Pixel, Electron
