= Nate Doss =

American disc golfer

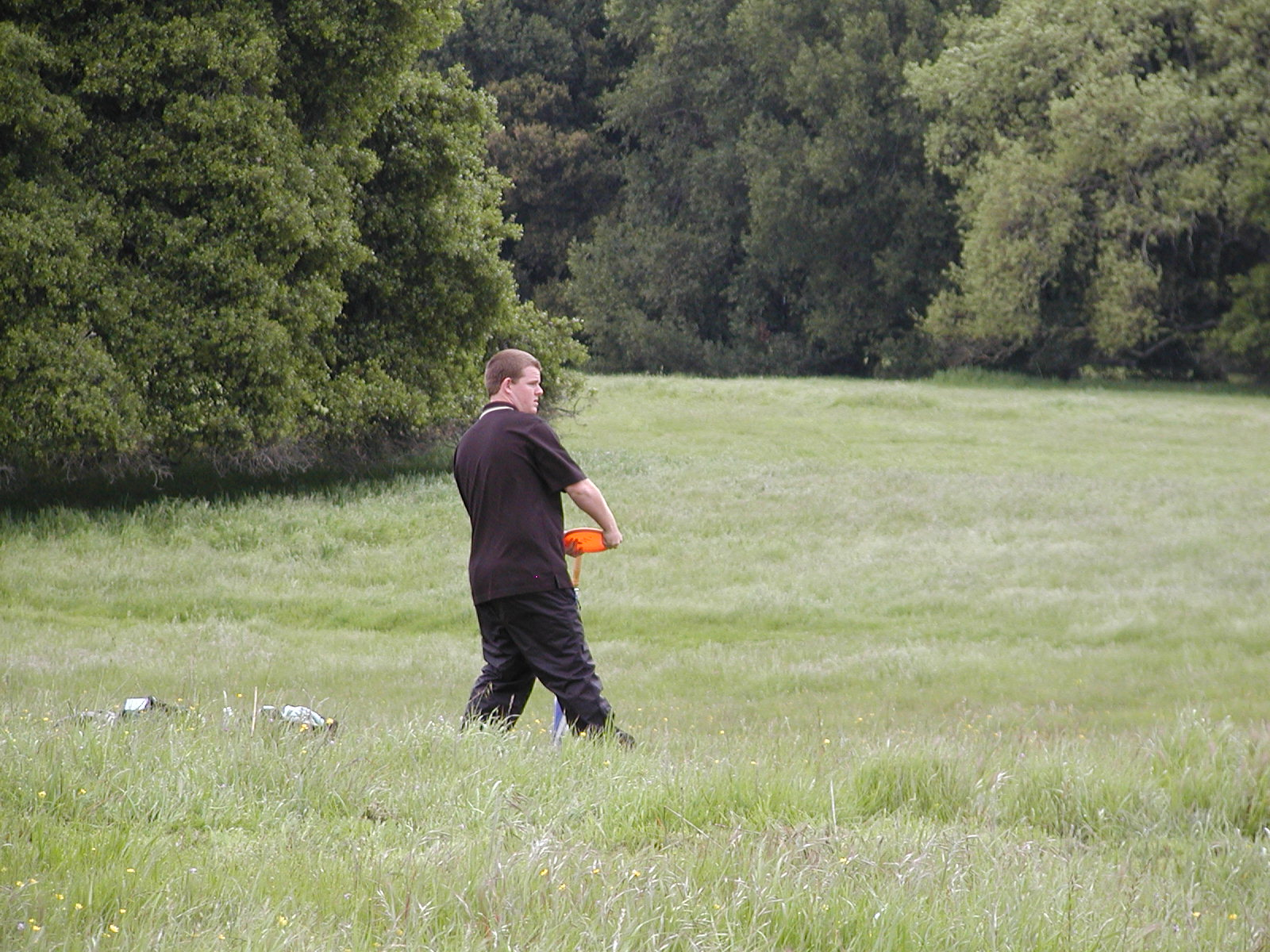
- Nate at the 2005 PDGA Match Play Championships

Personal information
- Full name: Nathan Doss
- Nickname: Nate
- Nationality: United States
- Born: Santa Cruz, CA
- Height: 6 ft 0 in (183 cm)
- Spouse: Valarie Jenkins

Sport
- Sport: Disc golf

Nate Doss is an American professional disc golfer who won three PDGA World Championships (2005, 2007, 2011). With his third win, Doss became only the second person to achieve three MPO world championship wins, after Ken Climo‘s twelve. Additionally, Doss became the first Discraft sponsored player to win Disc Golf's other prestigious event, the United States Disc Golf Championship, in 2008. After retiring from the game in 2018, Doss began a new career with his wife Valarie Jenkins (herself a four-time disc golf world champion) as a brewer, launching Bevel Craft Brewing. Doss also provides live color commentary on the Disc Golf Network.

== Amateur career ==
Doss first played disc golf when he was seven years old, and by the time he was eleven, he was hooked. Success wasn't too far behind. In 1998, at the age of thirteen, Doss was invited to the Amateur World Championships, held in Appleton, Wisconsin, by Steady Ed. He finished seventh in the Juniors < 16 division. In 1999, he went to Kansas City, Missouri and won the same division he took seventh in the year before. He turned pro the next year.

== Professional career ==
=== 2008 season ===
The 2008 season was possibly Doss's best season. While he won only one National Tour (NT) event, he also won the most prestigious disc golf tournament of the year, the United States Disc Golf Championship. This win gave him his largest payday as a professional disc golfer: $12,000. Other top finishes of the year include runner-up finishes in two majors: The Scandinavian Open, held in Skellefteå, Sweden, and the World Championships, held in Kalamazoo and Battle Creek, Michigan. His runner-up finish in the world championships was his fourth straight top two finish in this tournament, a run bested only by Ken Climo's nine straight wins.

In addition to the National Tour wins, Doss won two smaller tournaments and finished second in the National Tour Series. In just 14 events on the year, his earnings were $27,545, giving him an average of $1,967.5 per tournament attended. He finished the year with a 1036 rating, which was a stellar season by any measure.

=== 2009 season ===
The 2009 season was very much an up and down year by Doss's standards. Perhaps the greatest disappointment of the season came when he finished 12th at the World Championships, his worst finish there since he placed 18th in 2004. This finish ended his four-year run of top two finishes. On the upside, Doss won six tournaments, including two National Tour stops. He also finished on the lead card at the USDGC, taking fourth and his largest paycheck of the year. Doss wrapped up the year earning $18,088 in 23 tournaments, for an average of $786.43 per tournament. He finished the year rated 1033.

=== 2010 season ===
The 2010 season was another underwhelming year. Out of 22 events played, Doss won only two, the Brent Hambrick Memorial Open, a National Tour Event, and the Pittsburgh Flying Disc Open, an A-Tier event. Despite only winning twice, Doss finished in the top three in several National Tour events as well as Majors. Notable third-place finishes include the Steady Ed Memorial Masters Cup (NT), Beaver State Fling (NT), Japan Open (M), and the Minnesota Majestic (NT). Doss also finished fifth at worlds. His end of the year totals include $19,512 earned in 22 tournaments, for an average of $886.91 per tournament. His end of the year rating was 1036.

=== 2011 season ===
The 2011 season was Doss's second full season as a full-time professional. It was a hallmark season in a number of ways. First, this season marked the first time in his career that his Player Rating eclipsed the 1040 mark, peaking at 1042 as of the October 25th update, as well as the season ending update. In addition to one National Tour win, Doss won his third career World Championship in 2011, giving him sole possession of second place on the career world titles list. Another big win on the year was the inaugural World Disc Golf Match Play Championships, which he took home $5,000 for. 2011 was a banner year for Doss, as he set or broke many of his personal bests.

==== 2011 Worlds ====
In 2011, the 2011 Disc Golf World Championships took place in Doss's backyard - Santa Cruz, California. One of the courses included in the championship, DeLaveaga DGC, was the first course Doss played on, at seven years of age. Doss beat second-place finishers Josh Anthon and Will Schusterick by seven throws for his third world championship, his first since 2007.

== Professional wins ==
=== Notable wins ===
Date	Tournament	Tier	Location	Earnings	Results Page
July 25, 2005	World Championships	M	Allentown, PA	$5,000	Results Page
May 25, 2007	Beaver State Fling	NT	Portland, OR	$1,615	Results Page
June 30, 2007	Canadian Open	NT	Toronto Island, Ontario	$2,821	Results Page
August 1, 2007	World Championships	M	High Bridge, WI	$5,500	Results Page
June 20, 2008	Golden State Classic	NT	La Mirada, CA	$1,800	Results Page
October 1, 2008	US Disc Golf Championship	M	Rock Hill, SC	$12,000	Results Page
April 25, 2009	Green Country Open	NT	Pawhuska, OK	$1,080	Results Page
June 19, 2009	Minnesota Majestic	NT	Twin Cities, MN	$2,500	Results Page
July 10, 2010	Brent Hambrick Memorial Open	NT	Columbus, OH	$1,800	Results Page
June 10, 2011	Kansas City Wide Open	NT	Kansas City, MO	$1,650	Results Page
August 9, 2011	World Championships	M	Santa Cruz, CA	$7,000	Results Page
September 2, 2011	Vibram Open at Maple Hill	NT	Leicester, MA	$3,000	Results Page

Major, NT playoff record (2-2)

Year	Tournament	Tier	Opponent	Result
2007	Beaver State Fling	NT	David Feldberg/Avery Jenkins	Won
2009	Green Country Open	NT	Josh Anthon	Won with birdie on first extra hole
2009	Brent Hambrick Memorial Open	NT	David Feldberg/Avery Jenkins	Feldberg won with birdie on first hole
2010	Sunshine State Classic	NT	Ken Climo	Lost to birdie on first extra hole

=== Summary ===
Competition Tier	Wins	2nd	3rd	Top-5	Top-25	Events
World Championships	3	2	1	7	13	17
Other Majors	1	3	4	17	31	34
National Tour	8	11	13	48	83	85

=== Annual statistics ===
Year	Events	Wins	Top 3	Earnings	$ / Event	Rating*	World Ranking*
1998	2	0	0	$0	$0.00	x	-
1999	3	0	0	$0	$0.00	967	-
2000	5	0	0	$329	$65.80	976	-
2001	13	0	1	$1,731	$133.15	995	-
2002	9	0	2	$2,127	$236.33	1000	-
2003	15	0	4	$4,573	$304.87	1001	-
2004	18	2	6	$6,328	$351.56	1013	-
2005	18	4	9	$13,832	$768.44	1027	5
2006	17	5	8	$14,021	$824.76	1029	8
2007	17	5	14	$22,663	$1,333.12	1030	3
2008	13	4	7	$26,545	$2,041.92	1036	2
2009	22	7	14	$17,338	$788.09	1033	7
2010	21	2	11	$19,012	$905.33	1036	9
2011	22	7	13	$31,268	$1,421.27	1042	1
2012	20	2	6	$15,539	$776.95	1039	6
2013	18	2	10	$15,566	$864.78	1041	10
2014	18	0	6	$16,794	$933.00	1037	2
2015	18	1	9	$22,034	$1,224.11	1032	6
2016	17	1	5	$18,164	$1,068.47	1029	-
Career	286	42	125	$247,864	$866.66	-	-

*At Year End

== Equipment ==
Doss is sponsored by Discraft. He has a number of signature discs (marked with *), and commonly carries the following discs in competition:

Drivers

- Force (ESP, Ti, Z)*
- Nuke (Ti)*
- Predator (Z)
- Pulse (ESP)
- XL (X)

Midranges

- Buzzz (Ti)*
- Drone (Ti)
- Hawk (Z)
- Wasp (Z)

Putters

- Challenger (D, Ti)
