= Paul Ulibarri =

American disc golfer (born 1988)

Personal information
- Full name: Paul Ulibarri
- Nationality: American
- Born: Show Low, AZ
- Height: 5 ft 10 in (178 cm)

Sport
- Sport: Disc golf
- Turned pro: 2008

Paul Ulibarri (born September 7, 1988) is an American professional disc golfer from Show Low, Arizona. In 2006, he won the PDGA Amateur Disc Golf World Championships and began playing professionally the following season. As of June 2020, Ulibarri has competed in over 500 PDGA sanctioned events and has 127 career tournament wins. His career earnings total over $376,000 making him the 7th highest earner in PDGA history. Ulibarri is currently the Discraft Team Captain and a member of the commentary team for Jomez Productions.

== Professional career ==
Since 2006, Ulibarri has finished in the top 10 of a Major Tournament 23 times. He finished every season between 2015 and 2021 among the top 15 players in total DGPT Points – excluding 2019 when he withdrew from competition due to injury, and is currently ranked 51st in the PDGA's United States Tour Ranking. Ulibarri's 104 tournament wins include 25 A-tier wins and 1 National tour win. Additionally, he won the Mixed Doubles World Championships in 2011 and 2012. As of 2021, Ulibarri holds the record for most consecutive holes played without going out of bounds (137) and has represented Team USA in The Presidents cup 5 times.

Season Totals
Season	Tournaments	Wins	Top 5 Finishes	Earnings
2007	21	4	8	$3,490
2008	27	3	11	$6,739
2009	42	6	21	$18,613
2010	39	9	26	$25,959
2011	48	11	34	$28,992
2012	43	8	24	$22,270
2013	41	5	22	$17,832
2014	43	5	26	$28,358
2015	42	8	23	$24,284
2016	42	14	28	$28,248
2017	40	7	22	$27,390
2018	38	9	23	$31,396
2019	19	7	12	$10,563
2020	34	10	20	$19,011
2021	31	5	8	$23,929
2022	21	1	4	$8,841
2023	32	3	6	$17,517

Notable Wins
Event	Tour	Pro Purse	Date
Amateur Disc Golf World Championships	PDGA AM MAJOR	N/A	25-Jul to 29-Jul-2006
Mixed Doubles World Championships	PDGA XC-TIER	$1,260	06-Aug-2011
Mixed Doubles World Championships	PDGA XC-TIER	$1,756	14-Jul-2012
Brent Hambrick Memorial Open	NATIONAL TOUR ELITE SERIES	$16,730	04-Jun to 05-Jun-2011
Showdown in Shelton	PRO/AM A/B-TIER	$12,150	12-Jul to 13-Jul-2014
Utah State Championships	PRO/AM B-TIER	$2,868	04-Nov to 05-Nov-2017
Barbasol Open at Austin	Disc Golf Pro Tour+ (plus)	$12,000	07-May to 10-May-2026

== Sponsorship and media ==
Ulibarri's first sponsorship was with Discraft in 2006. In 2008, he left Discraft and signed for 3 years with Innova discs until 2011. He joined Prodigy Discs in 2013 as part of their first class of sponsored players and represented prodigy for 6 years before returning to Discraft Discs in 2019, this time as the Team Captain. In 2020 Ulibarri joined Team Ledgestone, a disc golf retailer which handles his merchandising and which also runs the largest event on the Disc Golf Pro Tour, the Ledgestone Open in Peoria, Illinois. His other sponsors include Bushnell Corporation and Züca, a disc golf cart manufacturer. Ulibarri can be seen on Jomez Productions, a YouTube channel specializing in professional disc golf coverage and entertainment, as part of the commentary team and is regularly featured in their content along with Nathan Sexton and Jeremy Koling.

In 2021, Paul launched the Ulibarri Leadership Institute, an organization promoting the sport of disc golf through coaching, seminars, and mentorship programs. On the launch of the Ulibarri Leadership Institute, Paul Ulibarri said, "I have been blessed to be able to play the sport that I love for so long at a high level, and as I continue my journey as a player, am thrilled to share what I've learned throughout my career and help continue growing the sport. The Ulibarri Leadership Institute will be collaborating with some of the most talented names in sports to deliver unmatched instruction and career development services." In March 2022, Paul Ulibarri launched his charity organization, The Ulibarri Leadership Foundation, which offers scholarships for young disc golfers to attend college.

Sponsorship History
Manufacturer	Years Sponsored
Discraft	2006–2007
Innova Discs	2008–2011
Prodigy Discs	2012–2018
Discraft	2019–Present
