= Golf World =

Golf magazine

- Editor: Jaime Diaz
- Categories: Sports magazine
- Frequency: Weekly
- Paid circulation: 132,090
- Unpaid circulation: 26,666
- Total circulation (2014): 158,756
- Founded: 1947
- Final issue: July 28, 2014
- Company: Warner Bros. Discovery
- Country: United States
- Based in: New York City
- Language: English
- Website: www.golfworld.com
- ISSN: 0017-1891

Golf World was a weekly magazine covering the game of golf published by Condé Nast. It was in circulation between 1947 and 2014. After that, Golf World was available in digital form and from May 13, 2019 to April 8, 2022, the brand has been owned by Discovery, Inc.

== History and profile ==
The magazine was first published in 1947. It celebrated its 60th anniversary in 2007, and was therefore the oldest golf publication in the United States. It was purchased by The New York Times Company from Billian publishing, the original owners in 1988, who sold it to Condé Nast in 2001.

Golf World covered the game of golf, including the PGA Tour, LPGA Tour, Champions Tour, Nationwide Tour, European Tour, and amateur events around the United States and internationally. As a weekly, it was the only magazine providing in-depth previews and coverage of all the major tournaments. Preview issues of majors had dedicated sections that could include pull-out course maps, lineups of players, comparative charts from years past, and articles about what has happened in history and what to expect in the coming week. Coverage issues contained pull-out sections called "Rank and File" that provided in-depth analysis of players' performance in the past week's tournament. Also contained in the coverage issues were articles telling the stories of the week as well as stories about the tournament that did not usually make the news outlets, like breaking the story of Phil Mickelson changing coaches earlier in 2007 before Mickelson announced the change.

In July 2014, Golf World ceased its print edition for a digital-only edition. The final print edition cover, dated July 28, 2014, featured Rory McIlroy holding the Claret Jug after winning the 2014 Open Championship.

On May 13, 2019, Discovery, Inc. acquired Golf Digest (including Golf World) from Condé Nast in order expand into golf editorial media business.
