= Eagle Wynne McMahon =

Professional disc golf player

Personal information
- Full name: Eagle Wynne McMahon
- Nationality: United States
- Born: Boulder, CO
- Height: 6 ft 3 in (191 cm)

Sport
- Sport: Disc golf
- Turned pro: 2011

Eagle Wynne McMahon is an American professional disc golfer from Boulder, Colorado. He has 53 career wins (including two majors) and is one of the highest rated players in the world. At the end of the 2023 season he was ranked 1st in the world by UDisc.

== Professional career ==
=== Early career ===
McMahon began playing disc golf in 2007, when he was nine years old; after looking for a summer activity he soon began competing in smaller tournaments. His first victory in a PDGA-sanctioned event came in 2009 when he won the Johnny Roberts Memorial while competing in the Junior II Boys class, later going on to win tournaments in both the intermediate and advanced classes. McMahon turned professional in 2011, entering three tournaments without cashing. The following year he entered five tournaments and cashed for the first time in the C-tier Mile High Classic. After cashing in two of the three C-tier tournaments he entered in 2013 he had his breakout season in 2014 at age 16, cashing in 14 of the 15 tournaments he entered, with three wins and 12 podium finishes, earning over $5,000. His most notable win was in the A-tier 2014 Colorado State Disc Golf Championship.

=== 2015–present ===
In 2015 McMahon had his first full season as a touring pro, entering 29 tournaments, winning seven and earning over $15,000 in prize money. The following two seasons, 2016 and 2017, he continued to perform at a similar level, winning multiple times, and securing multiple podium finishes in National Tour events in 2017. In February 2018 he won his first national tour event, the Las Vegas Challenge, and followed this performance with two more National Tour wins at the Glass Blown Open and Beaver State Fling, as well as his first major win at the Konopiště Open, in the Czech Republic; his overall performance that season earned him the National Tour title for 2018. Since this breakout season he has been one of the top players in the MPO division, winning multiple times in the DGPT, including four in 2021 (DGLO, Portland Open, OTB Open, Las Vegas Challenge). In October 2021 he injured his throwing shoulder during filming for JomezPro, forcing him to withdraw from that year's Tour Championship. He returned to the tour at the beginning of the 2022 season but was forced to take a three-month break from the tour to continue rehabilitating his shoulder injury. However, he still managed to notch his biggest win to date in the European Open on his return in July, while playing without a forehand but compensating by throwing some tee shots with a left-handed backhand. After finishing 38th in the Professional Disc Golf World Championships a month later, he played in only three other lower-tier events before ending his season, winning the C-tier Boulder County Disc Golf Championships in his last outing of the year.

=== PDGA Rating ===
McMahon surpassed the Professional Disc Golf Association's 1000 rating mark at 14-years old, on June 24, 2014. In the ratings update of October 2018, McMahon was the highest rated player in the world, tied with Paul McBeth at a rating of 1048. As of May 2020, only three players had ever achieved a rating of 1050 or above. McBeth was the first one to reach this rating but was followed by both McMahon and Ricky Wysocki.

=== Injuries ===
Eagle has struggled with two significant injuries since 2019. The first injury was in his elbow, but the more serious one came during the 2019 United States Disc Golf Championships after a self-inflicted fracture to his throwing hand, which later got diagnosed as a boxer's fracture. This broken hand caused Eagle to abandon the last part of the 2019 season, but he was fully recovered at the start of the 2020 season.

== Sponsorship ==
McMahon and MVP Discs announced a 5-year deal starting in 2024.

McMahon announced his departure from Discmania on January 8, ending a nine-year relationship.

Before joining MVP, McMahon had been sponsored by both Discmania and Grip Equipment during his professional career.

== Notable victories ==
McMahon has won 50 events, with some of the most notable listed below.

Year	Tournament Name	Tournament type
2018	Konopiste Open	Major
2018	Beaver State Fling	National Tour
2018	Glass Blown Open	National Tour
2018	Las Vegas Challenge	National Tour
2018	National Tour Champion	
2019	Beaver State Fling	National Tour
2019	Nick Hyde Memorial	A-tier
2019	Tyyni	A-tier
2019	Memorial Championship	DGPT
2020	Discraft Great Lakes Open	DGPT
2020	Idlewild Open	DGPT
2021	Las Vegas Challenge	DGPT
2021	OTB Open	DGPT
2021	Portland Open	DGPT
2021	Discraft Great Lakes Open	DGPT
2022	European Open	Major
2023	Goat Hill Challenge	A-tier
2023	Beaver State Fling	DGPT Silver
2023	Discmania Open	DGPT Silver
2026	Swedish Open	DGPT
