= Jeremy Koling =

American disc golfer

Personal information
- Full name: Jeremy Koling
- Nickname: Big Jerm
- Nationality: United States
- Born: October 2, 1985 (age 41) Charlotte, NC
- Height: 6 ft 6 in (198 cm)
- Weight: 230 lb (104 kg)

Sport
- Sport: Disc golf
- Turned pro: 2009

Jeremy Koling is a professional disc golfer from Charlotte, North Carolina. He competes on the sport's North American tour: the Disc Golf Pro Tour, and competed on the PDGA National Tour until its last season in 2021. Among his most notable accomplishments are his 2008 PDGA Amateur World Championship win and his 2016 United States Disc Golf Championship win. Koling is the only male player to win the PDGA Amateur World Championships and earn the PDGA Male Rookie of the Year Award in back-to-back years (2008 and 2009).

Koling is a regular member of the disc golf commentary team for JomezPro Productions.

== Professional career ==
Koling has 68 professional wins. As a professional, he has won two National Tour events and one Major, the 2016 USDGC. He finished 4th in the 2016 NT, and 16th in the inaugural DGPT points standings. He has won two Pro World Mixed Doubles Championships with partner Paige Pierce.

=== Notable wins ===
Year	Tournament	Tier	Stroke Margin	Winning Score	Runner Up	Prize Money
2008	PDGA Amateur World Championship	Am-M	-12	(53-64-55-51-52-54-49-49-32=459)	Ryan Herzog	-
2014	Maple Hill Open	NT	-1	-17 (57-56-57-53=223)	Richard Wysocki	$2,500
2015	Memorial Championship	NT	Playoff	-41 (43-50-46-47=186)	Paul McBeth	$5,000
2016	United States Disc Golf Championship	M	-4	-17 (61-59-60=180)	Nikko Locastro	$10,000
2017	Waco Annual Charity Open	DGPT	Playoff	-34 (54-58-55=167)	James Conrad	$2,810
2018	Waco Annual Charity Open	DGPT	Playoff		Nate Perkins	$3,000

=== Summary ===
Competition Tier	Wins	2nd	3rd	Top-5	Top-25	Events*
World Championships	0	0	0	0	6	7
Other Majors	1	0	1	3	12	16
National Tour	2	0	1	9	40	44

*Through January 2017

=== Annual statistics ===
Year	Events	Wins	Top 3	Earnings	$ / Event	Rating^{†}	World Rankings^{†}
2007	1	0	0	$0	$0	968	-
2008	22	3	7	$1,683	$76.50	995	-
2009	26	7	14	$6,894	$265.15	1005	38
2010	32	6	15	$11,315	$353.59	1019	28
2011	38	14	21	$13,298	$349.95	1023	21
2012	38	9	23	$15,093	$397.18	1029	14
2013	33	5	10	$15,814	$479.21	1027	22
2014	32	10	17	$19,993	$624.78	1032	17
2015	26	5	11	$21,206	$815.62	1022	10
2016	27	5	9	$26,625	$986.11	1024	8
2017	33	5	10	$24,605	$745.60	1026	9
Career	275	64	127	$131,921	$479.71	-	-

^{†}At Year End

== Equipment ==
Koling is currently sponsored by MVP. He was previously sponsored by Innova Champion Discs. He commonly carries the following discs:

Drivers

- Champion Shryke
- Star Destroyer
- C-Line FD (Discmania)
- Champion Firebird
- Champion Eagle
- C-Line PD2 (Discmania)
- Champion Roadrunner
- Champion Thunderbird
- Star Thunderbird
- Star Wraith
- Pro Boss

Midranges

- Frontline X Mortar (Hyzer Bomb)
- C-Line MD2 (Discmania)
- C-Line MD3 (Discmania)
- Star Roc

Putters

- XT Nova
- P-Line P2 (Discmania)
- AviarX3
