= David Feldberg =

American professional disc golfer

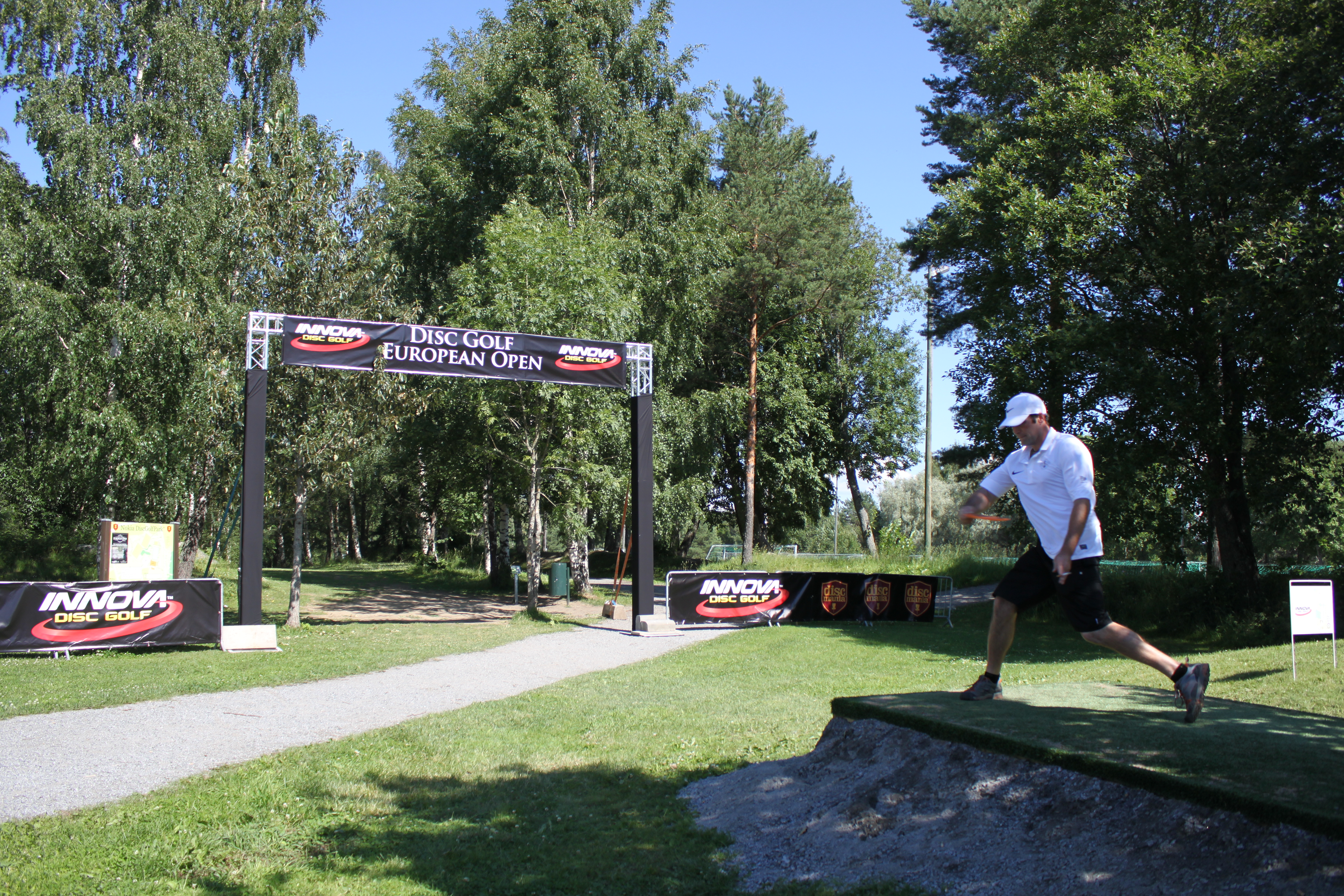

Personal information
- Full name: David Feldberg
- Nationality: United States
- Born: Silver Spring, Maryland
- Height: 5 ft 11 in (180 cm)

Sport
- Sport: Disc golf

David Feldberg (born 1977) is an American professional disc golfer, and tournament director. At the end of the 2017 season, he was the 45th ranked disc golfer in the world. Feldberg is one of the most successful disc golfers in the sport's history, having won 6 unique majors, second all time.

== Professional career ==
=== 2004 season ===
In many ways, Feldberg's 2004 season was a break-out year. It was in this year that he won his first National Tour event, besting second place by four shots in the Kansas City Wide Open. Also, he finished strong for the first time at World's, finishing fifth. Sprinkled through the year were top five finishes in other National Tour events.

=== 2005 season ===
The 2005 season was once again a season of growth. Over the course of the year, Feldberg's Player Rating increased 13 points to a career high of 1028. He won his first career major this year, the United States Disc Golf Championship, becoming the first person not named Ken Climo or Barry Schultz to win this event. In addition to winning the USDGC, Feldberg won two NTs, and finished the year with close to $30,000 in earnings.

=== 2008 season ===
2008 was a hallmark season for Feldberg. Playing in just 28 tournaments, he finished the year with 12 wins, including a National Tour victory. In addition to these victories, Feldberg also won two majors. In June he won the Japan Open, taking home over $6,000. Then in August he won the World Championships. After all was said and done, he finished the year with his best ever earnings and at the time his highest year end rating.

=== 2011 season ===
During the 2011 season, Feldberg broke Ken Climo's rating record. During the March update, his rating jumped to 1046, besting Climo's by two.

== Professional wins ==
=== Major wins (7) ===
Date	Tournament	Location	Earnings	Results Page
October 12, 2005	United States Disc Golf Championship	Rock Hill, South Carolina	$11,000	Results Page
August 25, 2006	European Open	Tampere, Finland	$3,175	Results Page
November 16, 2007	The Players Cup	Crystal River, FL	$10,000	Results Page
June 12, 2008	Japan Open	Tochigi, Japan	$6,429	Results Page
August 11, 2008	PDGA World Championships	Kalamazoo, Michigan	$6,000	Results Page
July 15, 2010	Scandinavian Open	Skellefteå, Sweden	$1,905	Results Page
July 21, 2011	European Open	Nokia, Finland	$4,200	Results Page

Major playoff record (0-1)

Year	Tournament	Opponent	Result
2010	Japan Open	Nikko Locastro	Lost to birdie on first extra hole

=== National Tour wins (18) ===
Date	Tournament	Location	Earnings	Results Page
June 4, 2004	Kansas City Wide Open	Kansas City, Missouri	$1,600	Results Page
May 7, 2005	Waco Charity Open	Waco, Texas	$1,400	Results Page
July 9, 2005	Brent Hambrick Memorial Open	Columbus, Ohio	$1,755	Results Page
May 5, 2006	Golden State Classic	La Mirada, California	$1,400	Results Page
July 15, 2006	Brent Hambrick Memorial Open	Columbus, Ohio	$1,620	Results Page
July 22, 2006	Skylands Classic	Warwick, New York	$2,150	Results Page
March 2, 2007	The Memorial	Scottsdale, Arizona	$2,500	Results Page
April 20, 2007	Disc Golf Hall of Fame Classic	Columbia County, Georgia	$1,250	Results Page
July 21, 2007	Brent Hambrick Memorial Open	Columbus, Ohio	$1,555	Results Page
March 6, 2008	The Memorial	Scottsdale, AZ	$2,500	Results Page
July 11, 2009	Brent Hambrick Memorial Open	Columbus, Ohio	$1,700	Results Page
July 17, 2009	First Class Challenge	Des Moines, Iowa	$1,660	Results Page
March 3, 2010	The Memorial	Scottsdale, Arizona	$3,000	Results Page
April 23, 2010	Carolina Clash	Charlotte, North Carolina	$2,000	Results Page
June 25, 2010	Minnesota Majestic	Twin Cities, Minnesota	$2,500	Results Page
August 27, 2010	Skylands Classic	Palmerton, Pennsylvania	$1,850	Results Page
June 1, 2012	Kansas City Wide Open	Kansas City, Missouri	$2,000	Results Page
September 5, 2014	Rochester Flying Disc Open	Rochester, New York	$1,850	Results Page

NT playoff record (3-1)

Year	Tournament	Opponent(s)	Result
2007	Beaver State Fling	Nate Doss/Avery Jenkins	Lost
2009	Brent Hambrick Memorial Open	Nate Doss/Avery Jenkins	Won with birdie on first extra hole
2010	Skylands Classic	Matt Orum	Won with birdie on first extra hole
2014	Rochester Flying Disc Open	Simon Lizotte	Won with birdie on first extra hole

=== Summary ===
Competition Tier	Wins	2nd	3rd	Top-5	Top-25	Events
World Championships	1	2	0	10	14	16
Other Majors	6	6	2	24	32	37
National Tour	18	15	14	60	108	110

=== Annual statistics ===
Year	Events	Wins	Top 3	Earnings	$ / Event	Rating*	World Ranking*
1999	1	0	0	$0	$0	952	-
2000	37	0	3	$3,384	$91.46	977	-
2001	43	1	8	$9,383	$218.21	1000	-
2002	38	2	6	$16,882	$444.26	1019	-
2003	31	4	14	$11,390	$367.42	1014	-
2004	21	5	13	$14,009	$667.10	1015	-
2005	25	9	17	$28,607	$1,144.28	1028	3
2006	28	9	16	$23,261	$830.75	1030	5
2007	28	8	18	$36,330	$1,297.50	1031	2
2008	27	11	23	$37,428	$1,386.22	1039	1
2009	30	12	18	$28,246	$941.53	1037	3
2010	29	12	22	$33,348	$1,149.93	1042	1
2011	32	11	19	$23,028	$719.63	1041	3
2012	42	11	27	$34,557	$822.79	1039	3
2013	27	5	16	$27,701	$1,025.96	1041	2
2014	20	4	6	$14,690	$734.50	1036	4
2015	29	6	12	$25,274	$871.52	1030	5
2016	3	1	1	$2,480	$826.67	1031	x
Career	491	111	239	$369,998	$753.56	-	-

*At Year End

== Equipment ==
Feldberg is sponsored by Infinite Discs since 2019. He throws a mixed bag with signature discs from a variety of different disc golf manufacturers.
