= Avery Jenkins =

American disc golfer

Personal information
- Nationality: United States
- Born: July 24, 1978 (age 48) Hinckley, OH
- Height: 6 ft 3 in (191 cm)

Sport
- Sport: Disc golf
- Turned pro: 2000

Avery Jenkins is an American professional disc golfer from Hinckley, Ohio. He is a former World Champion and three-time US distance champion. In 2016, Jenkins served as commentator for the inaugural Disc Golf World Tour

Jenkins grew up playing disc golf with his father, Leroy, his mother, three-time Women’s Masters World Champion Sharon, and his sister, four-time World Champion Valarie. He is currently sponsored by Clif Bar, Keen, Savage Apparel, Discmania Golf Discs, and Innova Champion Discs.

== Professional career ==
Jenkins has 56 professional wins, including the 2009 World Championship.

=== Notable wins ===
Year	Tournament	Tier	Stroke Margin	Winning score	Runner up	Prize money
2004	Japan Open	M	-1	(81-96-52=229)	Steve Rico/Ken Climo	$3,205
2006	The Players Cup	M	-4	(57-58-59=174)	Eric McCabe/Gregg Barsby	$10,000
2008	Greater Tulsa Open	NT	-2	(49-48-76=173)	Eric McCabe/David Feldberg	$1,560
2008	Vibram Open	NT	-7	(56-51-56=163)	David Feldberg	$2,500
2009	PDGA World Championships	M	Playoff	(53-49-50-45-56-50-46-27=376)	Josh Anthon	$5,500

Major, NT playoff record (1-4)

Year	Tournament	Tier	Opponent(s)	Result
2006	Japan Open	M	Steve Rico	Lost
2007	Beaver State Fling	NT	Nate Doss/David Feldberg	Lost
2008	Master’s Cup	NT	Steve Rico	Lost to birdie on first extra hole
2009	Brent Hambrick Memorial Open	NT	David Feldberg/Nate Doss	Feldberg won with birdie on first hole
2009	World Championships	M	Josh Anthon	Won with birdie on fifth extra hole

=== Summary ===
Competition Tier	Wins	2nd	3rd	Top-5	Top-25	Events
World Championships	1	0	1	2	14	18
Other Majors	2	3	2	13	29	36
National Tour	2	6	4	21	79	93

=== Annual statistics ===
Year	Events	Wins	Top 3	Earnings	$ / Event	Rating^{†}	World Rankings^{†}
1999	2	0	1	$0	$0.00	966	-
2000	23	5	8	$5,067	$220.30	992	-
2001	42	2	5	$9,995	$237.98	1007	-
2002	39	0	1	$10,594	$271.64	1013	-
2003	31	3	11	$7,191	$231.97	1004	-
2004	19	4	5	$9,287	$488.79	1007	-
2005	20	1	7	$8,116	$405.80	1016	18
2006	23	5	12	$27,635	$1,201.52	1030	4
2007	23	7	10	$19,537	$849.43	1026	7
2008	30	9	18	$32,859	$1,095.30	1028	4
2009	35	10	23	$29,767	$850.49	1029	4
2010	25	1	4	$12,550	$502.00	1023	25
2011	24	1	7	$14,599	$608.29	1027	14
2012	19	2	6	$10,976	$577.68	1024	27
2013	19	4	7	$7,109	$374.16	1019	29
2014	12	1	3	$4,517	$376.42	1024	29
2015	15	0	2	$6,979	$465.27	1012	32
2016	9	1	5	$3,142	$349.11	1010	-
Career	410	56	135	$219,920	$536.39	-	-

^{†}At Year End

== Equipment ==
Jenkins is sponsored by Innova Discs and Discmania Golf Discs. He has a number of past and present signature discs (marked with *), and commonly carries a combination of the following discs:

Drivers

- Destroyer (Pro, Star)*
- Firebird (Champion)
- Max (Star)
- PD (C-line)*
- PD2 (C-line, S-line)
- Wraith (Star)
- XCaliber (Star)

Fairway Drivers

- Eagle (Champion)
- TeeBird (Star)*
- Whippet (KC Pro)

Midranges

- Gator (Champion)
- Roc (KC Pro)

Putters

- Aviar (KC Pro)
