= Nikko Locastro =

American disc golfer (born 1988)

Personal information
- Full name: Nikko Locastro
- Nationality: United States
- Born: September 16, 1988 St. Louis, Missouri
- Height: 5 ft 5 in (165 cm)

Sport
- Sport: Disc golf

Nikko Locastro (born September 16, 1988) is a professional disc golf player from St. Louis, Missouri. He has been playing the sport professionally since 2006. As of May 2023, Locastro was ranked 54th in the world, and had the 40th highest rating at 1027.

In 2009, and then again in 2010, he broke Barry Schultz's season winnings record. He was previously sponsored by Gateway Disc Golf, Dynamic Discs, Innova Discs, and Prodigy Disc. by Westside Discs through 2021, and as of December 27, 2021 announced that he is leaving Westside for the 2022 season. In 2011, Locastro was awarded the Player of the Year award, for the third consecutive year. In 2022, he was disqualified at the European Open due to an incident involving Nikko threatening a tournament official. He was subsequently suspended by the PDGA for 9 months, followed by 15 months of probation.

== Professional career ==
=== 2009 season ===
In Locastro's 2009 season he played 43 events and won 16 of them. Of the wins, six were A-Tier tournaments, and one was a National Tour event. His most notable event, however, was his win in the United States Disc Golf Championship, his first major. His win made him only the fifth different winner in this tournament. He also bested the previous record for earnings in a year, beating Barry Schultz's total by over $2,000.

=== 2010 season ===
Locastro's 2010 season improved upon his previous year. In fewer events, he managed more winnings, besting his previous record by nearly $4,000. In addition to earning more, he was also more consistent, finishing no lower than 13th. Among his fourteen wins were 5 A-Tiers, a National Tour event, the Vibram Open, and his second major, the 2010 Japan Open, held in Tochigi, Nasu Highlands, Japan. He also finished second at the USDGC and Scandinavian Open, both majors.

=== 2011 season ===
In 31 events played as of November 11, Locastro had won 15. Of these 15 wins, 5 were A-Tiers, and two were National Tour events. One of the A-Tier wins included the Stockholm Open, held in Stockholm, Sweden. This was Locastro's only international win in 2011. As of the September and August updates, Locastro's player rating reached 1045, at that time the second highest rating yet, behind David Feldberg's 1046.

=== 2012 season ===
Locastro started out his 2012 season by winning the 13th annual Gentlemen's Club Classic. Averaging a 1070 rating over the three rounds, he took home $1,400 for his first A-Tier win of the year. Shortly after on May 5–6, Locastro won his second A-Tier win at the St. Louis Open tournament held annually. That year's tournament took place at the Jefferson Barracks, Sioux Passage, and Endicott courses. He also won the Ledgestone Insurance Championships Super Tour, where he took home $2,500 in winnings. Locastro finished 15th at World Championships.

== Professional wins ==
=== Notable wins ===
Date	Tournament	Tier	Location	Earnings	
March 5, 2009	The Memorial	NT	Scottsdale, Arizona	$2,500	Results
October 7, 2009	US Disc Golf Championship	M	Rock Hill, South Carolina	$15,000	Results
June 10, 2010	Japan Open	M	Tochigi, Japan	$5,450	Results
August 13, 2010	Vibram Open	NT	Leicester, MA	$3,000	Results
April 2, 2011	Texas State Championships	NT	Hitchcock, Texas	$1,410	Results
May 13, 2011	Alabama Disc Golf Championship	NT	Athens, Alabama	$2,065	Results
July 5, 2020	The Preserve Championship	DGPT	Clearwater, Minnesota	$4,200	Results
March 14, 2021	Waco Annual Charity Open	DGPT	Waco, Texas	$5,000	Results

Major, NT playoff record (1-0)

Year	Tournament	Tier	Opponent(s)	Result
2010	Japan Open	M	David Feldberg	Won with birdie on first extra hole

=== Summary ===
Competition Tier	Wins	2nd	3rd	Top-5	Top-25	Events
World Championships	0	0	2	4	10	11
Other Majors	2	4	2	9	18	21
National Tour	4	6	8	30	53	58
Disc Golf Pro Tour	1	0	3	2	22	27

=== Annual statistics ===
Year	Events	Wins	Top 3	Earnings	$ / Event	Rating^{†}	World Ranking^{†}
2006	15	2	5	$2,646	$176.40	996	-
2007	21	2	8	$5,535	$263.57	1008	37
2008	26	8	18	$13,848	$532.62	1024	12
2009	42	15	29	$40,926	$974.43	1032	2
2010	36	14	27	$45,256	$1,257.11	1040	1
2011	33	16	23	$29,859	$904.82	1044	4
2012	22	5	9	$14,618	664.45	1037	19
2013	29	6	19	$25,343	873.90	1041	6
2014	21	6	11	$18,320	872.38	1033	21
2015	32	14	21	$27,119	847.47	1036	4
2016	37^{‡}	12	22	$31,364	847.68	1028	-
Career	314	100	192	$254,834	$811.57	-	-

The above information was gathered from Locastro's player page.
^{†}At Year End
^{‡}Includes Disc Golf Pro Tour Championship (not PDGA Sanctioned)
