= Ricky Wysocki =

American disc golfer

Richard (Ricky) Wysocki
Personal information
- Full name: Richard Wysocki
- Nicknames: Ricky, Sockibomb
- Nationality: United States
- Born: June 5, 1993 (age 33) Brunswick, Ohio
- Height: 6 ft 4 in (193 cm)

Sport
- Sport: Disc golf

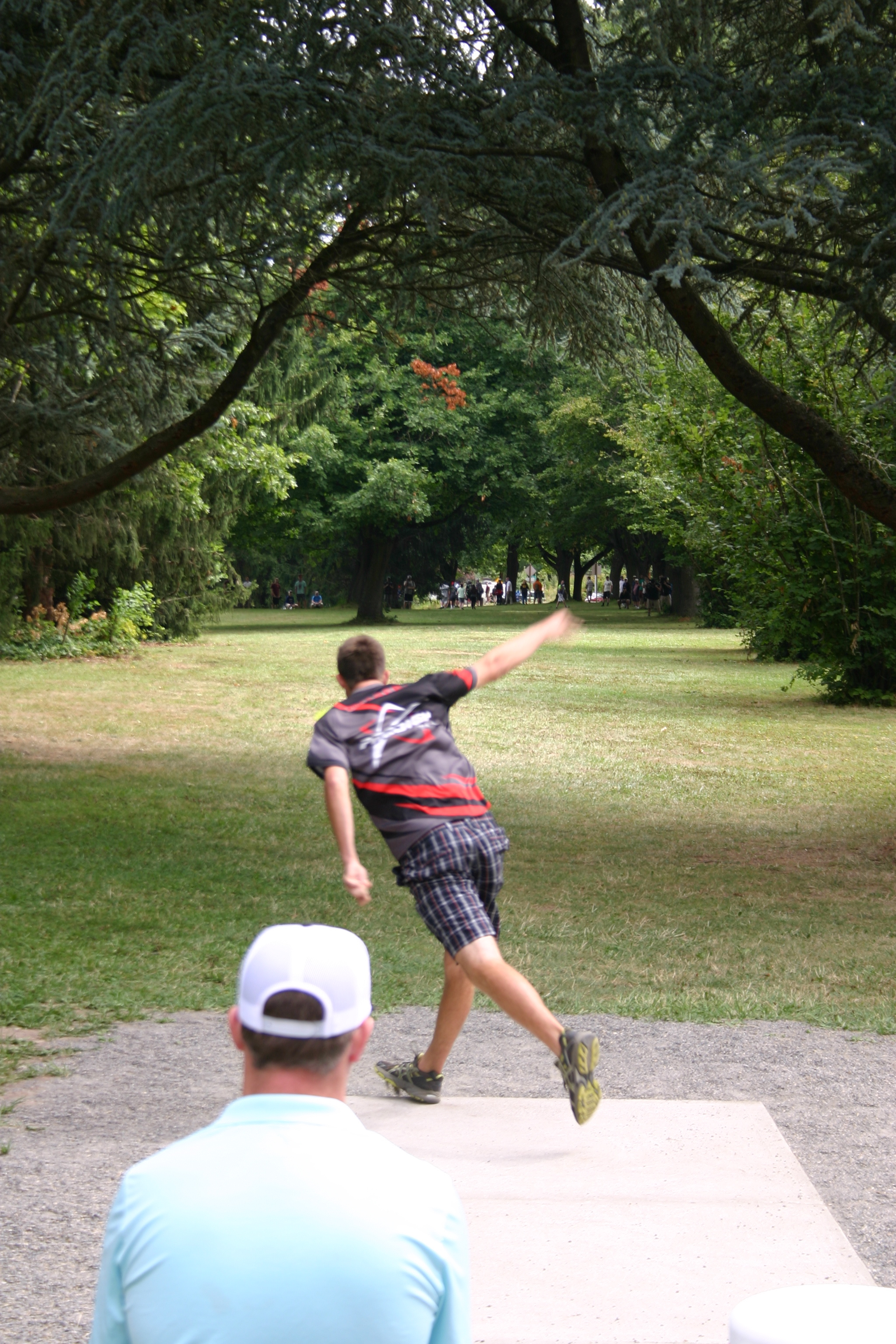
Ricky Wysocki

Richard Wysocki (born June 5, 1993, in Brunswick, Ohio) is an American professional disc golfer based in Fort Mill, South Carolina. Wysocki grew up in Medina, Ohio, near Roscoe Ewing Disc Golf Course.

After winning the 2010 PDGA Amateur Disc Golf World Championship, Wysocki turned pro. He is a 2-time PDGA World Champion and, as of April 2026, was the second highest rated player in the world. On January 4, 2022, Wysocki signed a 4-year/$4 million contract with Dynamic Discs. Wysocki's contract pays him a base salary of $1 million a year with potential to reach $2 million per year depending on the amount of discs Dynamic Discs sells with Wysocki's name on it. Additionally, Wysocki's contract included a $250,000 signing bonus paid to Ricky in Bitcoin.

== Professional wins (130 total) ==
Wysocki won the PDGA Rookie of the Year Award in 2011 and the Male Player of the Year Award in 2012, the only male player to win the two back-to-back. Wysocki won the PDGA-World Championship two times (2016-2017), defeating 6x World Champ Paul McBeth both times. Also in 2016, he won the PDGA National Tour Series, the Disc Golf World Tour Points series, and the Disc Golf Pro Tour points series.

=== Majors (6) ===
Year	Tournament	Stroke Margin	Winning score	Runner up	Prize money
2011	The PDGA Championship	-2	-50 (58-52-53-59-34=256)	Nathan Doss	$3,100
2014	Japan Open	-3	-34 (60-51-51-55-52-31=300)	Nikko Locastro	$4,410
2016	PDGA Pro World Championships	-6	-58 (47-48-51-56-52-28=282)	Paul McBeth	$10,000
2016	European Masters - Disc Golf World Tour	-1	-24 (54-55-56=165)	Paul McBeth	$5,001
2017	Australian Open	-1	-48 (57-48-58-49=212)	Eagle McMahon	$4,000
2017	PDGA Pro World Championship	-8	-41 (60-55-55-59=229)	Paul McBeth	$12,000

=== National Tour/DGPT Elite (23) ===
Year	Tournament	Stroke Margin	Winning score	Runner up	Prize money
2012	Brent Hambrick Memorial Open	-6	-30 (72-49-65-28=214)	Gregg Barsby	$1,800
2013	Texas State Championships	-10	-33 (65-59-62=186)	Paul McBeth	$1,660
2013	Disc Golf Hall of Fame Classic	-4	-44 (53-62-55-58=228)	Nikko Locastro	$2,700
2013	Great Lakes Open	-9	-32 (51-50-53=154)	Garrett Gurthie	$3,000
2014	Texas State Championships	-8	-28 (55-56-62=173)	Simon Lizotte	$1,782
2014	Fort Steilacoom Open	-4	-40 (49-49-47-45-29=219)	Will Schusterick	$1,800
2015	Vibram Maple Hill Open	-3	-26 (51-54-52-57=214)	Gregg Barsby	$3,700
2016	Kansas City Wide Open	-7	-27 (52-52-56=160)	Benjamin Wiggins	$2,525
2016	Masters Cup	-1	-25 (66-61-51=178)	Paul McBeth	$3,000
2016	Beaver State Fling	-3	-33 (54-50-53-54=211)	Philo Brathwaite	$3,750
2017	Gentlemen's Club Challenge	-2	-33 (48-51-49-54=202)	Paul McBeth	$3,000
2017	Beaver State Fling	0 (Playoff)	-28 (52-60-50-54=202)	Paul McBeth	$4,000
2018	Jonesboro Open	-4	-32 (52-54-54=160)	Garrett Gurthie	$3,000
2018	Santa Cruz Masters Cup	-2	-20 (62-68-54=184)	Joshua Anthon	$4,000
2018	Utah Open	-4	-25(49-56-44=149)	Eagle McMahon	$4,040
2020	Ledgestone Insurance Open	-8	-35 (58-55-55-51=219)	Paul McBeth	$6,000
2021	Texas State Disc Golf Championship	-4	-28 (55-52-51=158)	Matthew Orum	$5,000
2021	Jonesboro Open	-4	-35 (51-53-53=157)	Calvin Heimburg	$6,000
2021	Preserve Championship	-1	-35 (50-56-54=160)	Eagle McMahon	$7,250
2021	Ledgestone Insurance Open	0 (Tie)	-17 (54-61-67=182)	Calvin Heimburg	$8,250
2022	Texas State Disc Golf Championship	-1	-29 (55-52-53=160)	Calvin Heimburg	$8,000
2022	Dynamic Discs Open	-6	-10 (62-60-68-60=250)	Simon Lizotte	$8,600
2022	Discraft Ledgestone Open	-4	-26 (57-61-62-56=236)	Paul McBeth	$10,000
2022	Discraft's Green Mountain Championship	-3	-34 (52-52-50-60=214)	Matthew Orum	$12,000
2022	Tour Championship presented by Barbasol	N/A	N/A	Isaac Robinson	$35,000
2023	Preserve Championship presented by Prodigy	-5	-37	Cole Redalen, Calvin Hiemburg	$8,000
2023	Disc Golf Pro Tour Championship presented by Barbasol	-1	-15	Kyle Klein	$40,000

National Tour/DGPT Elite Wins: 25

=== Summary ===
Competition Tier	Wins	2nd	3rd	Top-5	Top-25	Events*
World Championships	2	4	0	7	10	10
Majors	4	3	3	19	22	24
National Tour	18	19	6	53	76	79

*As of May 2022

=== Annual statistics ===
Year	Events	Wins	Top 3	Earnings	$ / Event	Rating^{†}	World Ranking^{†}
2009	14	2	8	$0	$40	969	-
2010	33	6	16	$3,683	$111.61	1003	70
2011	44	15	26	$17,529	$398.39	1021	16
2012	41	15	31	$36,457	$889.20	1041	2
2013	34	18	24	$31,755	$933.97	1047	4
2014	35	14	28	$41,406	$1,183.03	1042	6
2015	22	5	13	$33,065	$1,502.95	1043	2
2016	23	13	20	$56,923	$2,474.91	1048	1
2017	29	14	24	$79,348	$2,736.14	1050	2
2018	26	7	14	$46,415	$1,785.19	1045	2
2019	22	4	14	$40,581	$1,844.59	1049	2
2020	16	5	10	$32,086	$2,005.38	1054	2
2021	25	6	14	$79,929	$3,197.16	1054	1
2022	20	6	10	$105,776	$6,819.30	1047	1
2023	19	4	5	$83,776	$4,409.26	1047	4
2024	23	3	13	$128,090	$5,569.13	1054	2
Career	383	125	252	$824,974.76	$1,941.12	-	-

*As of Jan 2025

^{†}At Year End
