= Disc golf in Estonia =

Overview of disc golf practiced in Estonia

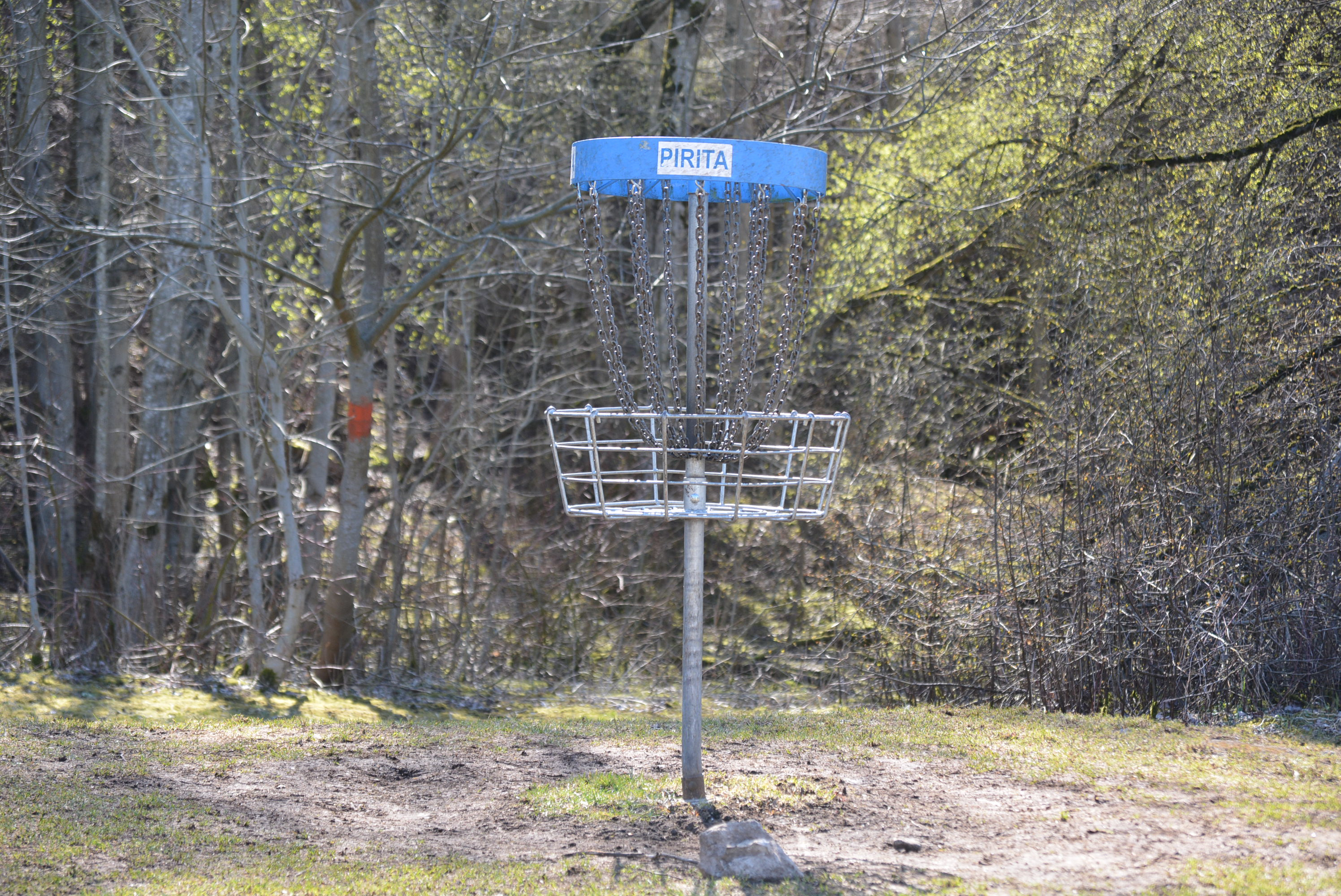
- Basket at Maarjamäe kettagolfipark (:et), a beginner-friendly 10-hole course in Pirita, outside Tallinn
- Governing body: Estonian Disc Golf Association (EDGL)
- Registered players: 1201 (October 2021)

National competitions
- Estonian Open

Disc golf (in Estonian: discgolf) is a popular sport in Estonia, where it is played at the recreational, club, and international competition levels.

Disc golf in Estonia is governed by the Estonian Disc Golf Association (EDGL, in Estonian: Eesti Discgolfi Liit). Its mission is to promote disc golf as an exciting and accessible sport.

== Popularity ==
Disc golf is the fastest growing sport in Estonia. It has enjoyed an exponential surge in popularity since the early 2010s, quickly making Estonia a hotbed of the sport, together with Finland. In the PDGA's Year-End Demographic Report for 2019, Estonia had 930 active members, 135 courses, and organized 44 PDGA-sanctioned events. In June 2020, there were 864 active PDGA members and 628 expired memberships.

The surge in disc golf popularity in Estonia is generally attributed to its close proximity to disc golf hubs around the Baltic Sea, namely Finland and Sweden. Rene Mengel, Estonian disc golf pioneer and the country's main disc golf promoter, attributes the success of the sport to a large number of disc golf courses throughout the country, and to the fact that disc golf discs can be purchased from local retail stores in Estonia in addition to specialized online retailers, helping make the sport accessible.

== Courses ==
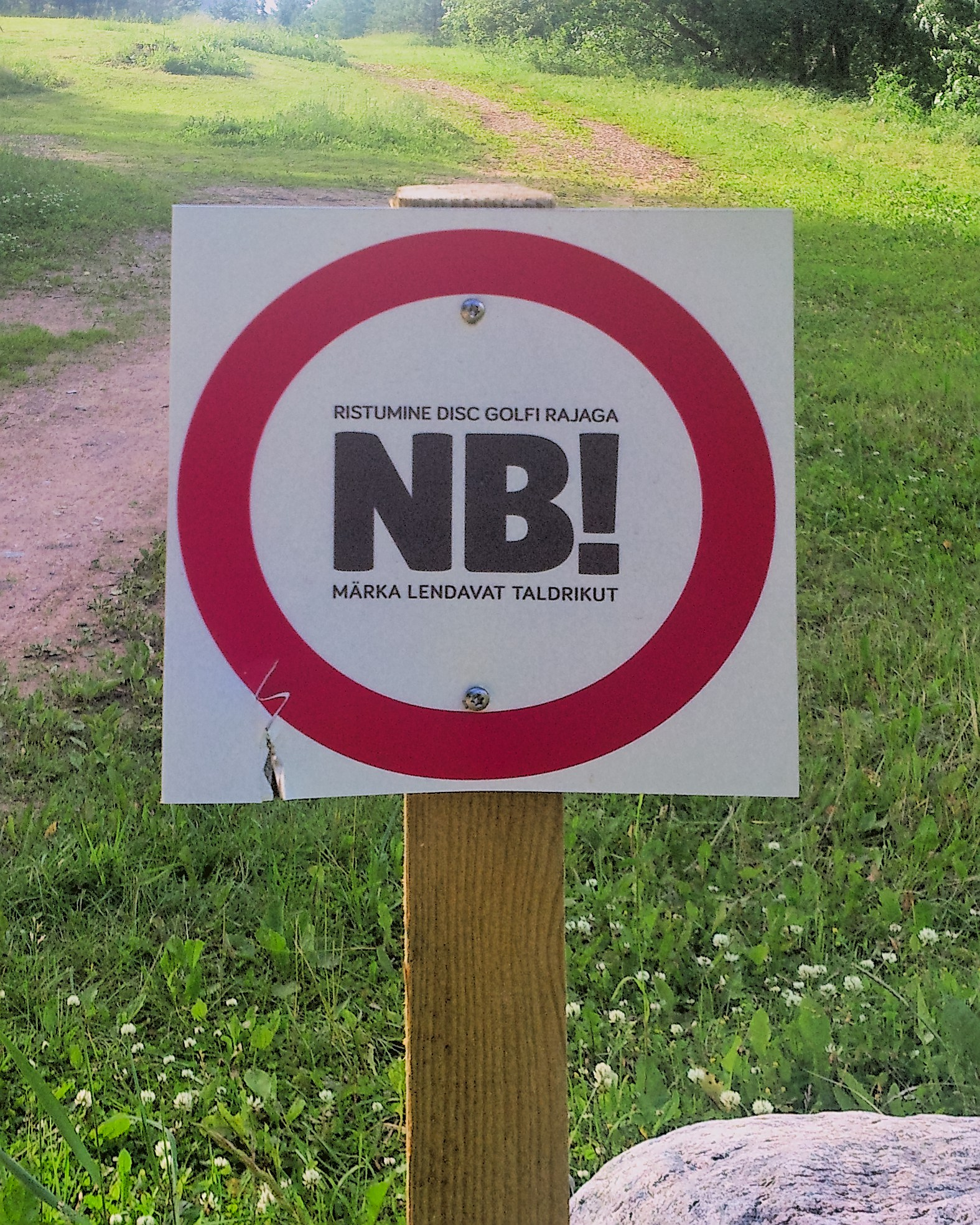
A sign at an Estonian disc golf course warning about flying discs

Approximately 2% of the world's disc golf courses are located in Estonia. Some of the most notable ones include Kõrvemaa, Jõulumäe, Alutaguse, Mäetaguse and Elva disc golf courses.

Most popular courses in Estonia are Männiku Wakepark, Tartu Roosi, Kurna, Coolbet Järve and Discland disc golf courses, of which 4 (excluding Tartu Roosi) are inside or in close proximity of Estonia's capital, Tallinn

In 2019, Tallinn was rated #4 on UDisc's list of Top 5 Disc Golf Cities outside the United States.

As of May 2021 Estonia has 212 courses, Estonia has the highest density of disc golf courses per square kilometer of any country, and the second-highest number of disc golf courses per capita, after Iceland.

Discgolfi Rajad is a disc golf course directory exclusive to Estonia. It allows players to filter courses by one of Estonia's 15 counties (Estonian: maakond, plural maakonnad) and provides hole-by hole information in addition to maps.

== Market ==
Disc Golf Metrix is a highly popular Estonian disc golf website. Between a third and half of its traffic originates from Estonia. It facilitates tournament management and allows players to keep track of their progress. In February 2020, the FFFD selected Disc Golf Metrix as its tournament management solution for the 2020 National Tour, the most prestigious tournament in France.

=== Manufacturers ===
Founded in 2017, Disctroyer is Estonia's first and only manufacturer of PDGA approved discs. Trindem OÜ manufactures the Discrait basket, which was certified by the PDGA at the Championship level in April 2017.

=== Tourism ===
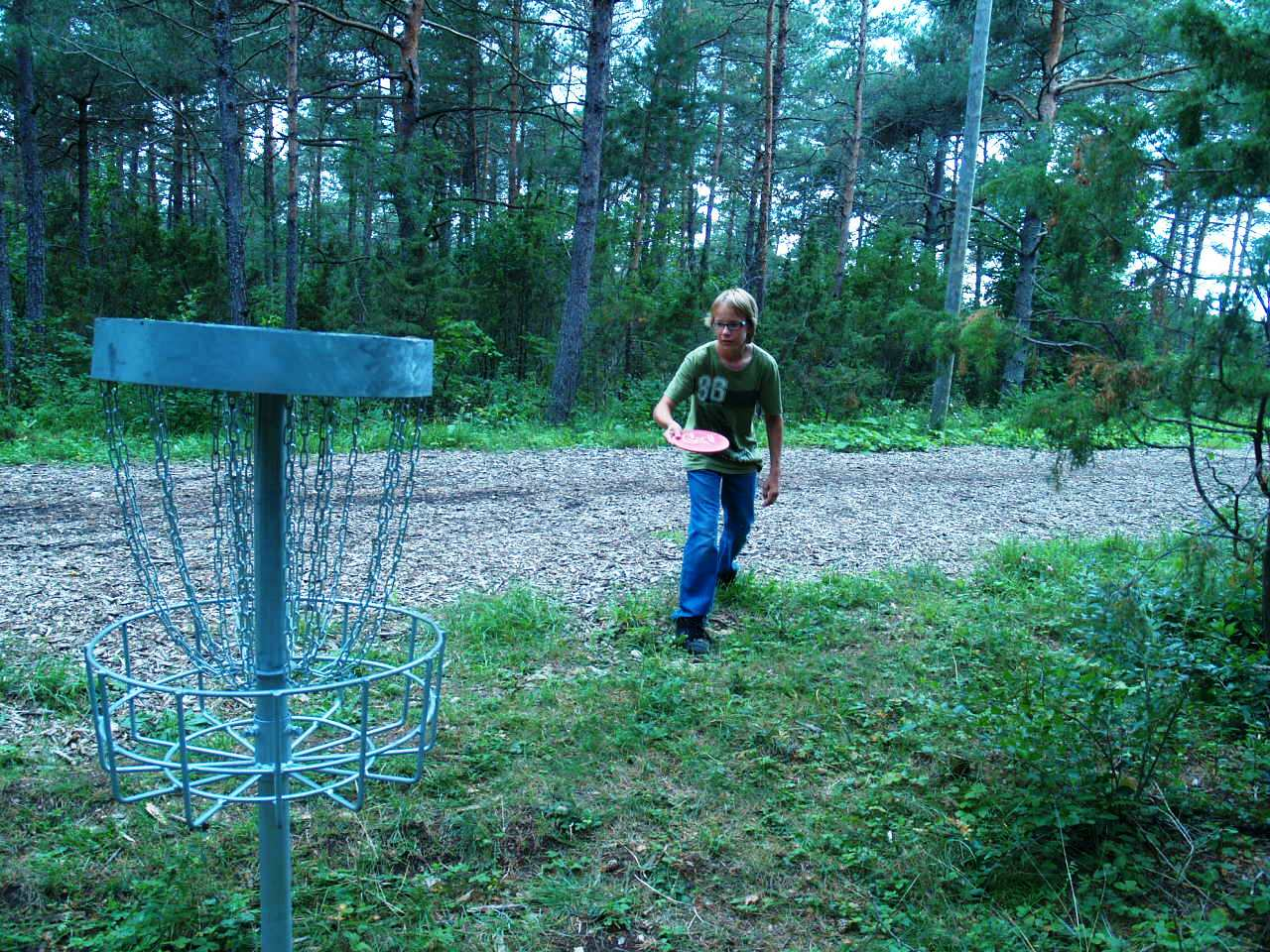
Disc golfer putting in Keila

Estonia is a popular destination among Finnish disc golf enthusiasts. Disc golf courses are marketed on Estonia's official tourist information website, and they are available as a map layer.

== Mass media ==
=== YouTube channels ===
- Eesti Discgolfiliit - 2,040 subscribers and 102,699 views
- Margiti Discgolfikanal - 2,270 subscribers and 686,005 views
- Albert Tamm - 2,370 subscribers and 42,910 views
- DiscSport Europe - 1,890 subscribers and 187,737 views
- DiscFish - 640 subscribers and 154,835 views

== Competitions ==
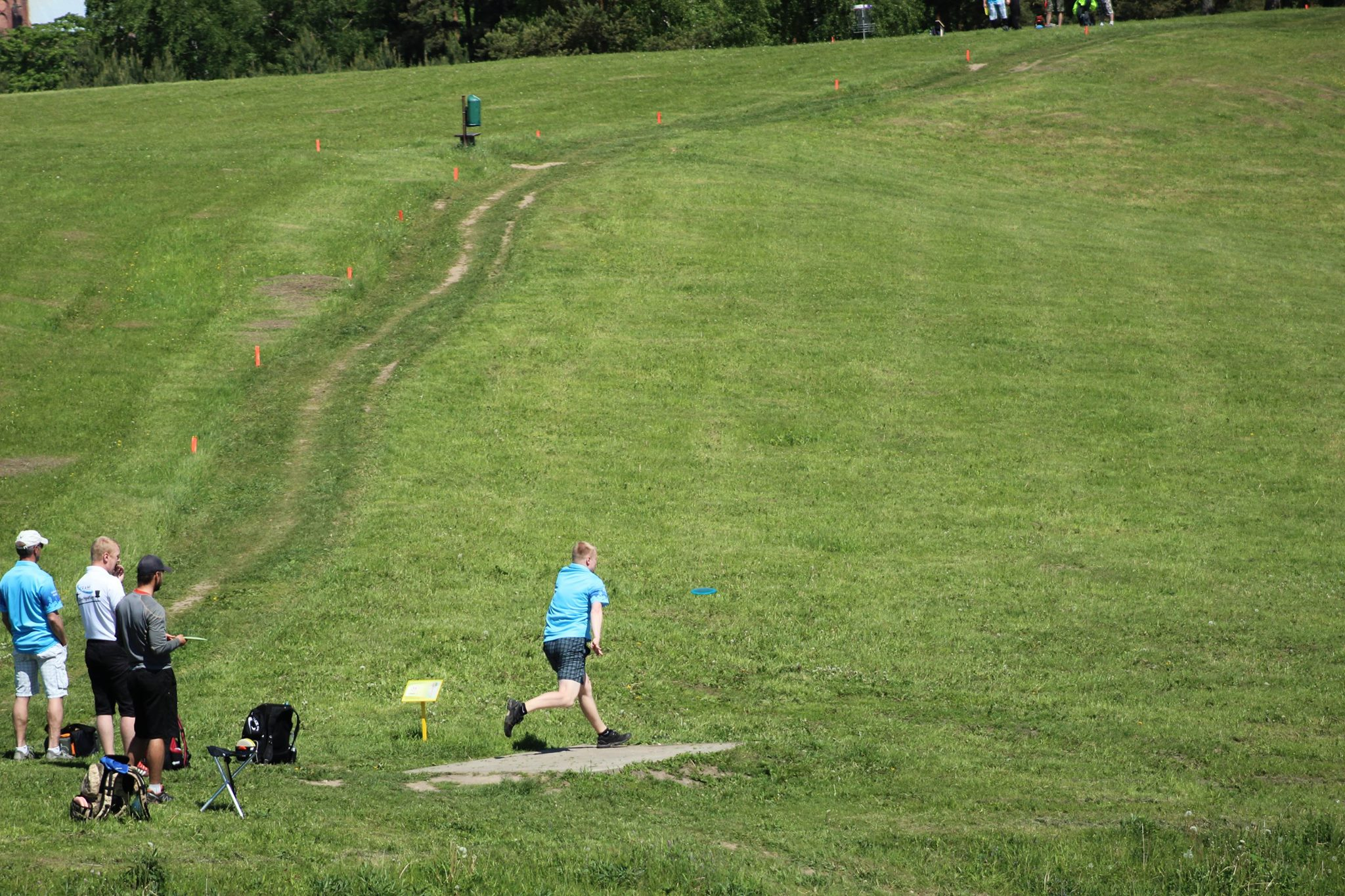
Disc golfer teeing off

- Estonian Open – A-tier PDGA event
- Innova Baltic Tour Pärnu Open
- Baltic Disc Golf Championships Alutaguse Open
- WFDF 2019 World Team Disc Golf Championships

== Notable Estonian disc golfers ==
Notable disc golfers include Albert Tamm, Silver Lätt, and Estonia's top women's disc golfer Kristin Lätt, who was the first European to win the US Open, and the number 1 ranked female in the world as of May 2022.

== See also ==
- Disc golf in Finland
- Disc golf in the United States
