= Krokhol Disc Golf Course =

Disc golf course in Norway

Coordinates: 59°48′10″N 10°55′33″E

Krokhol Disc Golf Course is a world-class 18-hole disc golf course located in Siggerud, Norway, 20 kilometres (12 mi) southeast of Oslo. Set on an abandoned ball golf course, it features long holes on hilly grass fairways lined with thick woods and is widely considered the best disc golf course in Norway. The course is available to the public at no charge, with an optional donation to help fund maintenance and future development.

== History ==
Krokhol Disc Golf Course was designed by Lars Somby in 2019 and developed as a partnership between the Muselunden disc golf club and the Ekeberg disc golf club.

== Course details ==
Krokhol Disc Golf Course features OB lines on most holes, water hazards on holes 12, 14, and 15, and an island green on hole 17. The course's elevated tees are made of wood and covered with artificial turf. Yellow Latitude 64° ProBasket Elite targets, sporting a flag, are featured on all eighteen holes. There is a bench on some holes.

=== Signature hole ===
According to course designer Lars Somby, Krokhol's signature hole is hole 12, a par 4 measuring 267 metres (876 ft) long.

=== Amenities ===
Being set on the property of Krokhol Golf Course, the course gives players access to a pro shop with discs for sale, as well as a cafe complete with food, drinks, and restrooms. The venue also sports a footgolf course.

== Tournaments ==
Krokhol Disc Golf Course was the fourth tournament on the 2019 and 2020 Oslo Tour. On 13-14 June 2020, it will co-host the 2nd annual Oslo Disc Golf Classic, a 2-day PDGA-sanctioned tournament and the premier disc golf event in Oslo.

== See also ==
List of disc golf courses in Norway
