= Disc golf in the United States =

Overview of disc golf practiced in the United States

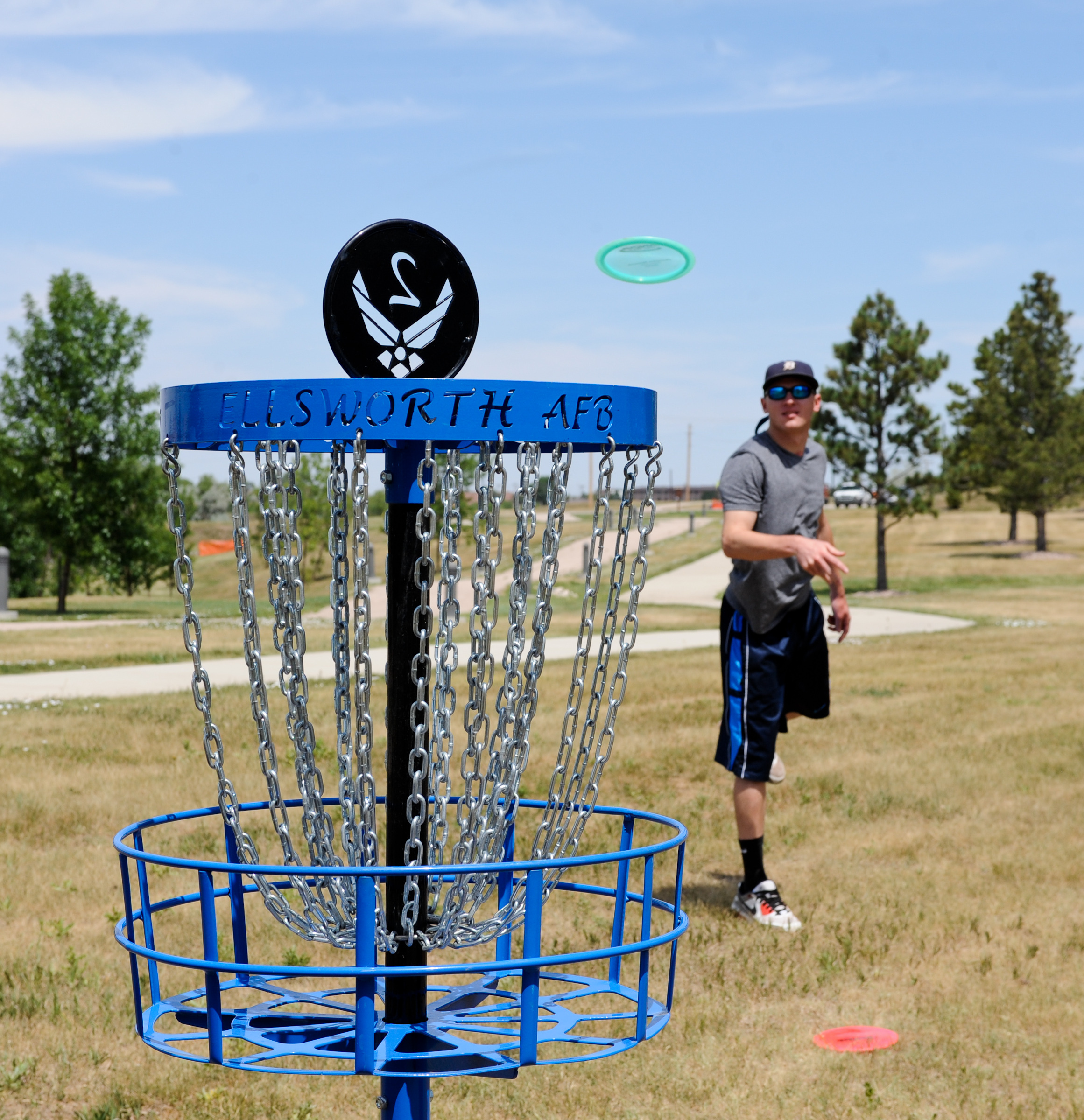
- Putting at the Ellsworth Air Force Base disc golf course in South Dakota
- Governing body: PDGA
- Registered players: 53,669 (December 2020)

National competitions
- United States Disc Golf Championship (USDGC)

Disc golf is a popular sport in the United States played at the recreational, club, and international competition levels.

== Popularity ==
In 2018, the PDGA counted 36,993 active members, 6,316 courses, and 3,068 disc golf tournaments in the United States. In 2021, PDGA counted over 50,000 active members and 9,454 courses.

== Courses ==
The world's first permanent disc golf course is the Oak Grove Disc Golf Course, which went into the ground in 1975 at Hahamongna Watershed Park (formerly known as Oak Grove Park) in Pasadena, California.

Approximately 75% of the world's disc golf courses are located in the United States. Some of the most notable ones include DeLaveaga, Maple Hill, Blue Ribbon Pines, Brewster Ridge, Diamond X, Borderland State Park Borderlands State Park and Milo McIver. Iowa, Kansas, and the Dakotas have the most courses per capita, whereas Massachusetts, Ohio, Connecticut, Wisconsin, and Delaware have the most courses per square mile of dry land. Texas, Wisconsin, and Minnesota have the most courses overall.

As of February 2020, there are 7,379 known disc golf courses in the United States on the official PDGA Course Directory. Below is a listing of lists of disc golf courses in the United States by state and territory. 3,281 of them (49%) are full-size courses with 18 holes or more, and 3,093 of them (46%) are smaller courses that feature at least 9 holes.

State or territory	Courses	as % of U.S. courses	per capita (/1M)	per 10,000 km^{2} of dry land
Alabama	111	1.5%	22.1	8.5
Alaska	37	0.5%	50.5	0.3
Arizona	71	1%	9.9	2.4
Arkansas	112	1.5%	37.2	8.3
California	321	4.4%	8.1	8
Colorado	198	2.7%	34.3	7.4
Connecticut	31	0.4%	8.6	24.7
Delaware	12	0.2%	12.1	23.8
Florida	168	2.3%	7.8	12.1
Georgia	131	1.8%	12.2	8.8
Hawaii	14	0.2%	9.6	8.4
Idaho	96	1.3%	52.2	4.5
Illinois	277	3.8%	21.6	19.3
Indiana	172	2.3%	25.3	18.5
Iowa	288	3.9%	90.3	19.9
Kansas	254	3.4%	86.5	12
Kentucky	111	1.5%	24.6	10.9
Louisiana	57	0.8%	12.2	5.1
Maine	70	0.9%	51.4	8.8
Maryland	46	0.6%	7.4	18.3
Massachusetts	57	0.8%	8.1	28.2
Michigan	298	4%	29.6	20.4
Minnesota	329	4.5%	57.7	16
Mississippi	95	1.3%	32.1	7.8
Missouri	176	2.4%	28.6	9.9
Montana	59	0.8%	54.4	1.6
Nebraska	107	1.5%	54.5	5.4
Nevada	35	0.5%	11.3	1.2
New Hampshire	32	0.4%	23.2	13.8
New Jersey	38	0.5%	4.1	20
New Mexico	50	0.7%	23.6	1.6
New York	130	1.8%	6.4	10.7
North Carolina	263	3.6%	25.2	20.9
North Dakota	59	0.8%	75.7	3.3
Ohio	264	3.6%	22.4	24.9
Oklahoma	160	2.2%	40.4	9
Oregon	134	1.8%	31.6	5.4
Pennsylvania	195	2.6%	15	16.8
Rhode Island	4	0.1%	3.6	14.9
South Carolina	113	1.5%	22.1	14.5
South Dakota	76	1%	85.7	3.9
Tennessee	149	2%	21.6	14
Texas	448	6.1%	15.4	6.6
Utah	79	1.1%	24.1	3.7
Vermont	42	0.6%	65.3	17.6
Virginia	129	1.7%	14.9	12.6
Washington	128	1.7%	16.6	7.4
West Virginia	66	0.9%	36.8	10.6
Wisconsin	344	4.7%	58.4	24.5
Wyoming	40	0.5%	69.3	1.6

== Organizations ==
=== California ===
- San Diego Aces Disc Golf Club – San Diego
- San Francisco Disc Golf Club – San Francisco
- DeLaveaga Disc Golf Club – Santa Cruz

=== Colorado ===
- Mile High Disc Golf Club – Arvada

Louisiana

- Shreveport-Bossier City Disc Golf Union (SBDGU) – Shreveport

=== Minnesota ===
- Minnesota Frisbee Association (MFA) – Minneapolis
- Mankato Area Disc Golfers United (MADGU) – Mankato
- Rochester Area Disc Golf Association (RADGA) – Rochester

=== North Carolina ===
- Rocky Mount Disc Golf – Rocky Mount
- Western North Carolina Disc Golf Association – Asheville

=== Oregon ===
- Stumptown Disc Golf Club - Portland

=== Pennsylvania ===
- Pittsburgh Flying Disc Society (PFDS) – Pittsburgh

=== South Carolina ===
- Blown Keg Disc Golf Club – Greenville

=== Texas ===
- Funkytown Flyers – Dallas–Fort Worth metroplex
- Lewisville Disc Golf Club – Lewisville
- San Antonio Disc Club – San Antonio
- Houston Flying Disc Society – Houston
- Alamo Community Disc Club – San Antonio

== Manufacturers ==
- Innova – Largest brand, makes the most molds
- Discraft – Most popular brand, sponsors a legion of top pros
- House of Disc (Once Trilogy Discs):
  - Dynamic Discs – The largest of the four brands in Trilogy, based in America. Discs are manufactured in Sweden as part of "House of Disc".
  - Latitude 64 – Based in Europe. Part of "House of Disc" brands. Discs manufactured in Sweden.
  - Westside Discs – Based in Europe. Originally a Finnish-based company purchased by Latitude 64 as part of "Trilogy Discs". Discs manufactured in Sweden.
  - Kastaplast – Based in Europe. Originally a Swiss company purchased by "House of Disc". Discs manufactured in Sweden.
  - Discmania – Offshoot of Innova, created their own brand and were purchased by "House of Disc" (Once Trilogy Discs) in 2024. Discs manufactured in Sweden.
- MVP Discs (+ Axiom Discs and Streamline Discs) – Most popular disc golf company due to the attraction of James Conrad's "Holy Shot" to win the 2021 World Championship in Ogden, Utah, the signing of charismatic YouTube personality Simon Lizotte in 2023, and elite pro Eagle McMahon in 2024

== Mass Media ==
=== Magazines ===
Notable disc golf magazines published in the United States include DiscGolfer, the official publication of the Professional Disc Golf Association, as well as Chasin' the Chains Magazine and Physics of Flight Magazine, both by Dynamic Discs.

=== Podcasts ===
Notable disc golf podcasts recorded in the United States include PDGA Radio, Ultiworld Disc Golf's The Upshot, Showmez, and Disc Golf Answer Man, co-hosted by Eric McCabe.

== Streaming ==
- Disc Golf Network – 6,500 subscribers and 4,000 concurrent viewers during the Disc Golf Pro Tour

== Competitions ==
- United States Amateur Disc Golf Championships
- United States Disc Golf Championship (USDGC)

== See also ==
- Disc golf in Estonia
- Disc golf in Finland
