= Schmitten Discgolf Parcours =

Disc golf course in Austria

Coordinates: 47°20′39″N 12°45′22″E

Course information
- Elevation: 1,830 metres (6,000 ft)
- Website: www.schmitten.at/en/Summer-on-the-mountain/Hiking/Hiking-tips/Discgolf
- Established: 2009

Main
- Designer: Anders Golfen OG
- Holes: 18
- Par: 57
- Length: 3,500 metres (11,500 ft)

Schmitten Discgolf Parcours is a seasonal 18-hole disc golf course located in Zell am See, Austria. The course is set on a ski slope and progresses downhill. The first hole is 1,830 metres (6,000 ft) above sea level and the last hole is 430 metres (1,410 ft) lower. Established on 15 June 2009, it was the first disc golf course in Austria and the 3,000th course to be added to the PDGA Course Directory. It is open for free to players who purchased a valid cable car ticket.

== Course details ==
Most holes on Schmitten Discgolf Parcours are set on an open field, except hole 9. The course sports cyan tee pads made out of rubber and twenty Discmania DISCatcher baskets. There is a practice basket before hole 1 and a second one after hole 18. The course layout has been redesigned since its inception and a new map was published in 2018.

== Tournaments ==
Schmitten Discgolf Parcours hosts the yearly PDGA-sanctioned Schmitten Open tournament since 2010.

== See also ==
- List of disc golf courses in Austria
