= Glossary of disc golf terms =

This is a basic glossary of disc golf terms that includes both technical terminology and jargon developed over the years in the sport of disc golf. Where noted, some terms are used only in American English (US), only in British English (UK), or are regional to a particular part of the world, such as Australia (AU).

Where words in a sentence are also defined elsewhere in this article, they appear in italics.

== 0-9 ==
150 Class
A category of discs used in PDGA-sanctioned events with 150 Class in its title. All discs on the PDGA Approved Discs list may be used in these events if their measured weight is 150 grams or lower. 150 Class was required for all play in Japan prior to 2018.

== A ==
ace
Another name for a hole-in-one.
air bounce
1. A disc thrown in such a way as to suddenly "bounce" by quickly rising into the air early on in its flight.
2. Sudden lift that a disc receives due to headwind.
albatross

A scoring term used when a player finishes a hole in three fewer strokes than par. An ace on a par 4, or 2 strokes on a par 5, both qualify.
anhyzer
A throwing technique where the outside edge of the disc is tilted upward so that the top face of the disk faces towards the thrower. This release causes the natural turn of a disc to be increased. The steeper the angle, the more pronounced the effect.

== B ==
basket
The target of the player's throws. The disc must land in the basket to complete a hole.
birdie
A scoring term used when a player finishes a hole in one fewer strokes than par. A two-stroke on a par 3, a three-stroke on a par 4, or a four-stroke on a par 5 all qualify.
bogey
A scoring term used when a player finishes a hole in one more stroke than par. A four-stroke on a par 3, a five-stroke on a par 4, or a six-stroke on a par 5 all qualify.

== C ==
chains
The set of loosely hanging metal chains extending vertically from the top ring of the basket to the central pole, used as a mechanism to "catch" flying discs by slowing down and trapping them, which typically causes them to fall into the basket below. Players will often "shoot for the chains" in order to ease a disc into the basket.
Circle 1
A commonly used synonym for putting area.
Circle 2
An unofficial term for the area that is within 20 meters of the target, as measured from the rear of the marker disc to the base of the target, but outside of Circle 1.

== D ==
drop zone
An area on the course, as designated by the director, where play is resumed as an alternative to or in replacement of playing from the original lie. The throwing area from within a drop zone is marked and played in a manner similar to the marking and playing of a teeing area. A teeing area may also be used as a drop zone.

== E ==
eagle
A scoring term used when a player reaches the basket in two fewer strokes than par. For example, an eagle may be scored with an ace on a par 3, a two-stroke on a par 4, or a three-stroke on a par 5.

== F ==
fade
A disc's tendency to hook left (for right-handed backhand throws) at the end of the flight. The fade of a particular disc is rated from 0 to 5: a disc rated 0 will finish straightest, while a disc rated 5 will hook hard at the end of the flight. High fade discs are typically used for spike and skip shots.
flat
A throwing technique where the outside edge of the disc is level with the inside edge so that the top of the disk is facing up relative to the thrower. This release allows the disc's flight path to mimic the one given by the manufacturer.
flex
A shot shape where a disc is released on an anhyzer angle, causing it to initially turn to the right (for RHBH throws) before fading back to the left (for RHBH throws) by the end of the flight. The result is an "s-shaped" flight path.

== G ==
glide
A disc's ability to maintain loft during flight. The glide of a particular disc is rated from 1 to 7: discs with a low glide number tend to lose their inertia and drop from the air more quickly than those with a high number. Discs with more glide are best for new players, and for producing maximum distance. Discs with less glide are more accurate in high wind situations, when staying aloft for a longer amount of time can be undesirable.

== H ==
Hyzer
A disc golf throwing technique where the outside edge of the disc is tilted downward so that the top face of the disk is facing away from the thrower. This release causes the natural turn of a disc to be reduced. The steeper the angle, the more pronounced the effect.
Hole out
To successfully complete play of a hole.

== K ==
Kick
An informal term for a change in a disc's flight trajectory due to contact with an obstacle.

== L ==
Lie
The spot on the playing surface behind the marker, upon which the player takes a stance in accordance with the rules. It is a line 30 centimeters in length extending back along the line of play from the rear edge of the marker disc. The lie for the first throw on a hole is the teeing area. A drop zone is also a lie.
Line of play
The imaginary line on the playing surface extending from the center of the target through the center of the marker disc and beyond.

== M ==
Mandatory/Mando
Short for mandatory. The term is often on plaques, maps, signs, or trees at a course, to identity mandatory flight paths for discs on a certain hole. E.g., to guide the disc between two trees or left of one.

== O ==
OB
An abbreviation of out of bounds.
Out of bounds
When a thrown disc lands in an area of the course considered to be out of play. In competitive play, the player is usually penalized through a stroke penalty and must throw from the disc's last point in bounds or a drop zone.
Overstable
A flight that turns left (RHBH throw).

== P ==
Putter
A disc used to approach or hit the basket.
Putting Area
The area within 10 meters of the target, as measured from the rear of the marker disc to the base of the target.

== R ==
Roller
A throw where most of the distance comes from the disc rolling on the ground instead of through the air.

== S ==
Simon Lines
A Simon line is a shot characterized by an unusually high or wide route taken to bypass obstacles, named after professional player Simon Lizotte.
Skip
A shot that is meant to fly after it hits the ground.
Speed
1-14 Speed is the rate at which a disc can travel through the air. Speed 14 distance drivers are the fastest, having the PDGA maximum legal wing width. Faster discs cut into the wind with less effort and are best when throwing up wind. Slower discs take more power to throw upwind, but they are easier to throw more accurately and may actually go further downwind. High speed discs are not recommended for beginners as they require more power to fly properly.
Spike/Spike Hyzer
A shot that lands almost vertically and does not skip.
Stable
A flight that does not turn.

== T ==
Teebox
A designed area at the beginning of a hole in which players throw their first shot. The area is often rectangular and can be a hard surface such as concrete.
Turn
Turn is the tendency of a disc to bank ("turn over") to the right (for RHBH throws) at high speeds during the initial part of the flight. A disc with a +1 rating is most resistant to turning over, while a -5 rating will turn the most. Discs rated -3 to -5 make good roller discs. Discs with less turn are more accurate in the wind. Discs with more turn are easier for beginners to throw for distance.

== U ==
Understable
A flight that turns right (RHBH throw).

== See also ==
- Glossary of golf
