= List of disc golf courses in Norway =

As of January 2020, there are 89 known disc golf courses in Norway on the official PDGA Course Directory. 47 of them (53%) are full-size courses with 18 holes or more, and 36 of them (40%) are smaller courses that feature at least 9 holes. Norway has 15.8 courses per million inhabitants.

Disc golf courses in Norway

List of disc golf courses in Norway as of January 2020 (Note: All disc golf courses listed below and their related information were pulled from the PDGA, UDisc, Disc Golf Course Review (DGCR), The Disc Golf Scene (TDGS), Infinite Courses, and local course directories unless referenced otherwise.)
| Course | Location | # | Since |
|---|---|---|---|
| Ankerskogen | Hamar | 27 | 1987 |
| Atlanten Frisbeegolfbane | Kristiansund | 18 | 2012 |
| Badevika Diskgolfbane | Frekhaug | 18 | 2017 |
| Beisfjord IL DiscGolfPark | Beisfjord | 9 | 2014 |
| Bjerkøy Frisbeegolfbane | Nøtterøy | 12 | 2016 |
| Blindheim | Ålesund | 6 | 2015 |
| Bratten Disc Golf | Bodø | 12 | 2011 |
| Brekke Activity Center | Flesberg | 12 | 2006 |
| Bugården | Sandefjord | 18 | 2011 |
| Bølgane Frisbeegolfpark | Kristiansand | 18 | 2009 |
| Børstad FrisbeegolfPark | Hamar | 13 | 2018 |
| Charlottenlund | Tromsø | 9 | 2016 |
| Christiansfjelds Frisbee Park | Elverum | 18 | 2016 |
| Dragvoll Disk Golf Arena | Trondheim | 18 | 2012 |
| Draumeparken | Hardbakke | 18 | 2015 |
| Ekeberg | Oslo | 18 | 1983 |
| Elverum Videregående Skole | Elverum | 9 | 2017 |
| Fagerli Skjenepark | Larvik | 18 | 2017 |
| Flaktveit Discgolfpark | Flaktveit | 18 | 2018 |
| Flaktveit Discgolfpark 9 | Flaktveit | 9 | 2017 |
| Forsheimer DiskGolfPark | Oslo | 12 | 2014 |
| Fortet Arendal | Kolbjørnsvik | 18 | 2016 |
| Frogner | Oslo | 9 | 2005 |
| Furutangen Diskgolf | Osen | 24 | 2018 |
| Gaupne Parken Discgolfbana | Gaupne | 6 | 2007 |
| Gålå Discgolfbane | Gålå | 18 | 2015 |
| Haltejohansvika (aka Frekhaug) | Frekhaug | 9 | 2013 |
| Haugaland Frisbeebane | Haugesund | 16 | 2005 |
| Hemne Disc Golf Park | Kyrksæterøra | 12 | 2017 |
| Herdla Diskgolfbane | Herdla | 18 | 2017 |
| Hestehagen Diskgolfbane | Tønsberg | 18 | 2022 |
| Holmenkollen DiscGolfPark | Oslo | 18 | 2016 |
| Holta DiscGolfPark | Lillesand | 18 | 2017 |
| Hvaler DiscGolfPark | Vesterøy | 6 | 2014 |
| Høytorp DiscGolfPark | Mysen | 18 | 2017 |
| Jemtegård Frisbeegolfbane | Valldalen | 18 | 2012 |
| Jørpelandsholmen | Jørpeland | 12 | 2015 |
| Jørstadmoen DiscGolfPark | Fåberg | 18 | 2013 |
| Karidalen FrisbeeGolfPark | Lena | 18 | 2018 |
| Karmøy Discgolfbane | Blikshavn | 12 | 2010 |
| Kloppedal Frisbeegolf Bane | Arendal | 18 | 2002 |
| Knattholmen | Sandefjord | 18 | 2018 |
| Krokhol Disc Golf Course | Oslo | 18 | 2019 |
| Lade Diskgolfpark | Trondheim | 5 | 2002 |
| Langevåg Frisbeegolfarena | Sula | 27 | 2004 |
| Lier Stadion FrisbeeGolfbane | Lierbyen | 9 | 2006 |
| Lynghaugparken Frisbeegolfbane | Fyllingsdalen | 18 | 2002 |
| Lømyra DiscGolfPark | Fiskerstrand | 9 | 2012 |
| Medalen Discgolfbana | Lom | 18 | 1987 |
| Menstad Frisbeebane | Skien | 8 | 2013 |
| Muselunden Frisbeegolfbane | Oslo | 12 | 2003 |
| Måløy Disc Golf | Måløy | 27 | 2003 |
| Nordre Modum | Vikersund | 6 | 2014 |
| Onsøy Discgolf Arena | Fredrikstad | 9 | 2016 |
| Preikestolen Disc Golf Course | Jørpeland | 20 | 2021 |
| Rensåsen | Bodø | 12 | 2015 |
| Risvollan Frisbeegolfbana | Trondheim | 9 | 2009 |
| Rotvoll Discgolfbane | Trondheim | 9 | 2016 |
| Rud DiscGolfPark | Rud | 10 | 2018 |
| Rådhusparken DiscGolfPark | Lørenskog | 18 | 2015 |
| Rødsparken | Halden | 18 | 2013 |
| Røyslimoen | Lillehammer | 9 | 2012 |
| Salen Frisbeegolfbane | Hammerfest | 15 | 2012 |
| Sandnes Disc Golf Park | Sandnes | 23 | 2016 |
| Sauaskiten Discgolfbane | Våg | 18 | 2011 |
| Sjøholt Frisbeegolfbane | Sjøholt | 12 | 2012 |
| Skien Disc Golf Course | Skien | 18 | 2006 |
| Skippervik Frisbeegolfbane | Trondheim | 18 | 2015 |
| Skjerstad Discgolfbane | Skjerstad | 9 | 2009 |
| Skjevik Frisbeegolfpark | Hjelset | 9 | 2016 |
| Skjold Disc Golf Park | Øverbygd | 12 | 2013 |
| Skogen Diskgolfbane | Lillehammer | 18 | 2018 |
| Sokndal Frisbeegolfbane | Hauge | 9 | 2015 |
| Sola Frisbeegolfbane | Sola | 18 | 2004 |
| Solør Discgolfbane | Flisa | 18 | 2018 |
| Stavern Diskgolf | Stavern | 18 | 2020 |
| Steinan Disc Golf Course | Trondheim | 9 | 2009 |
| Stjørdal DiscGolfPark | Stjørdalshalsen | 10 | 2016 |
| Stovner Disc Golf Park | Oslo | 18 | 1994 |
| Sukkevann Frisbeegolfpark - Original | Kristiansand | 18 | 2014 |
| Sukkevann Frisbeegolfpark - The Woods | Kristiansand | 18 | 2018 |
| Tellevik | Hordvik | 9 | 2013 |
| Trolla DiscGolfPark | Trolla | 10 | 2018 |
| Tønsberg Frisbeegolfbane | Tønsberg | 20 | 1997 |
| Vear Disc Golf Course | Vear | 20 | 2015 |
| Volsdalsberga Frisbeegolfarena | Ålesund | 9 | 2009 |
| VUL Frisbeegolf | Vollen | 12 | 2017 |
| Yggdrasil FrisbeeGolf Arena | Oslo | 18 | 1998 |
| Ølberg Frisbeegolfbane | Ræge | 18 | 2015 |
| Øverby Disc Golf Course | Gjøvik | 18 | 2014 |
| Øverås Diskgolfpark | Vestnes | 18 | 2015 |
| Øye DiscGolfPark | Surnadalsøra | 18 | 2018 |
| Øyer Ungdomsskole DiscGolfPark | Øyer | 9 | 2015 |
| Øyom DiscGolfPark | Lesjaskog | 9 | 2019 |

== See also ==
List of disc golf courses in Austria
