= Disc golf in Finland =

Overview of disc golf practiced in Finland

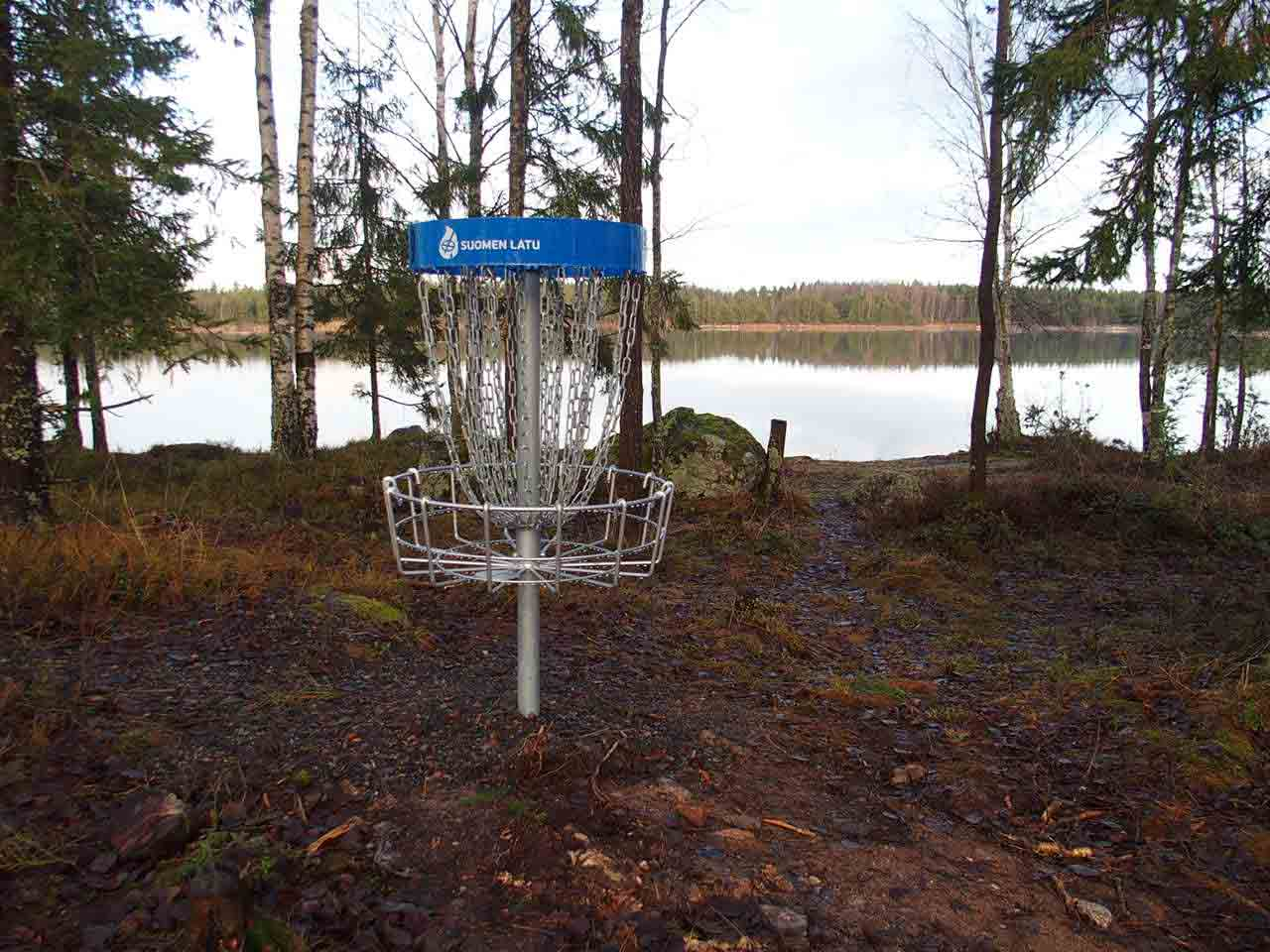
- Hole #18 at Hauninen DiscGolfPark in Raisio
- Governing body: FDGA
- First played: 1980s
- Registered players: 2,815

National competitions
- European Open

Disc golf (in Finnish: frisbeegolf) is a popular sport in Finland played at the recreational, club, and international competition levels.

Disc golf in Finland is governed by the Finnish Disc Golf Association (FDGA, Finnish: Suomen frisbeegolfliitto). Its mission is to promote the sport and to "organize disc golf activities in Finland together with its approximately 150 member organizations."

== Popularity ==
Disc golf is the fastest growing sport in Finland. According to the Finnish Research Institute for Olympic Sports (KIHU), it is more popular among Finns than ball golf, volleyball, basketball and tennis. The country is frequently called a model country for disc golf, a Mecca, and a hot bed.

In June 2020, there were 2,815 active PDGA members and 2,985 expired memberships, an increase from June 2015, when there were 1,434 and 686, respectively.

The popularity of disc golf in Finland has been variously attributed to Jussi Meresmaa’s marketing know-how, the fact that disc golf is taught in gym class curriculums, and that municipalities build courses to attract new taxpayers. Finland's proximity to other disc golf hubs around the Baltic Sea, namely Estonia and Sweden, is also a factor.

Number of PDGA members at Year-End.

Number of Courses at Year-End.

Number of Events at Year-End.

== Courses ==
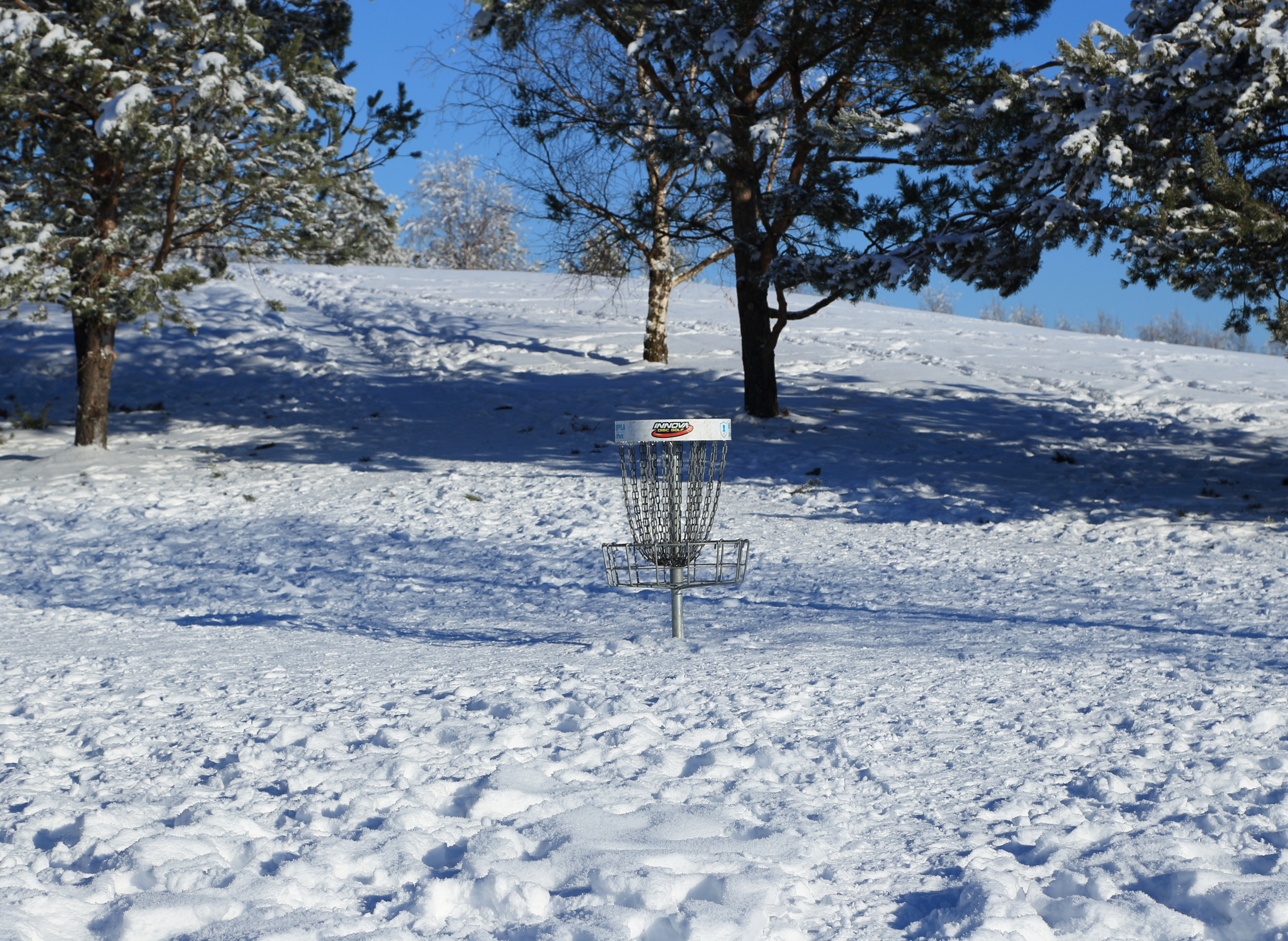
A disc golf basket in the snow at the Meri-Toppila course in Oulu

Approximately 7% of the world's disc golf courses are located in Finland. Some of the most notable ones include Puijo DGP in Kuopio, Kaatis in Vihti, Pikkarala Frisbeegolf in Oulu. In 2019, Helsinki topped UDisc's list of Top 5 Disc Golf Cities outside the United States.

Most courses in Finland are located in public parks or sporting areas and can be played for free. Commercial courses are generally found around sports complexes, ski resorts, spas and camping areas.

== Market ==
Finland is the disc golf market share leader in Europe. In 2014, Spin18 estimated the total value of the European disc golf industry to 16 million Euros, with Finland accounting for more than half of it, at around 9 million Euros.

Budget Sport, a large Finnish sports equipment retailer, sponsored the 2015 European Open and features disc golf equipment prominently in its retail stores.

=== Manufacturers ===
As a country, Finland has the second largest number of disc golf equipment manufacturers, second only to the United States. Major Finnish disc brands include Discmania, founded by Jussi Meresmaa in Tampere, Finland, Westside Discs, which is associated with Dynamic Discs and Latitude 64˚, Viking, Obsidian, and Prodiscus, which also manufacturers discs for Missouri-based Full Turn and Australian Fourth Circle Discs.

== Tourism ==
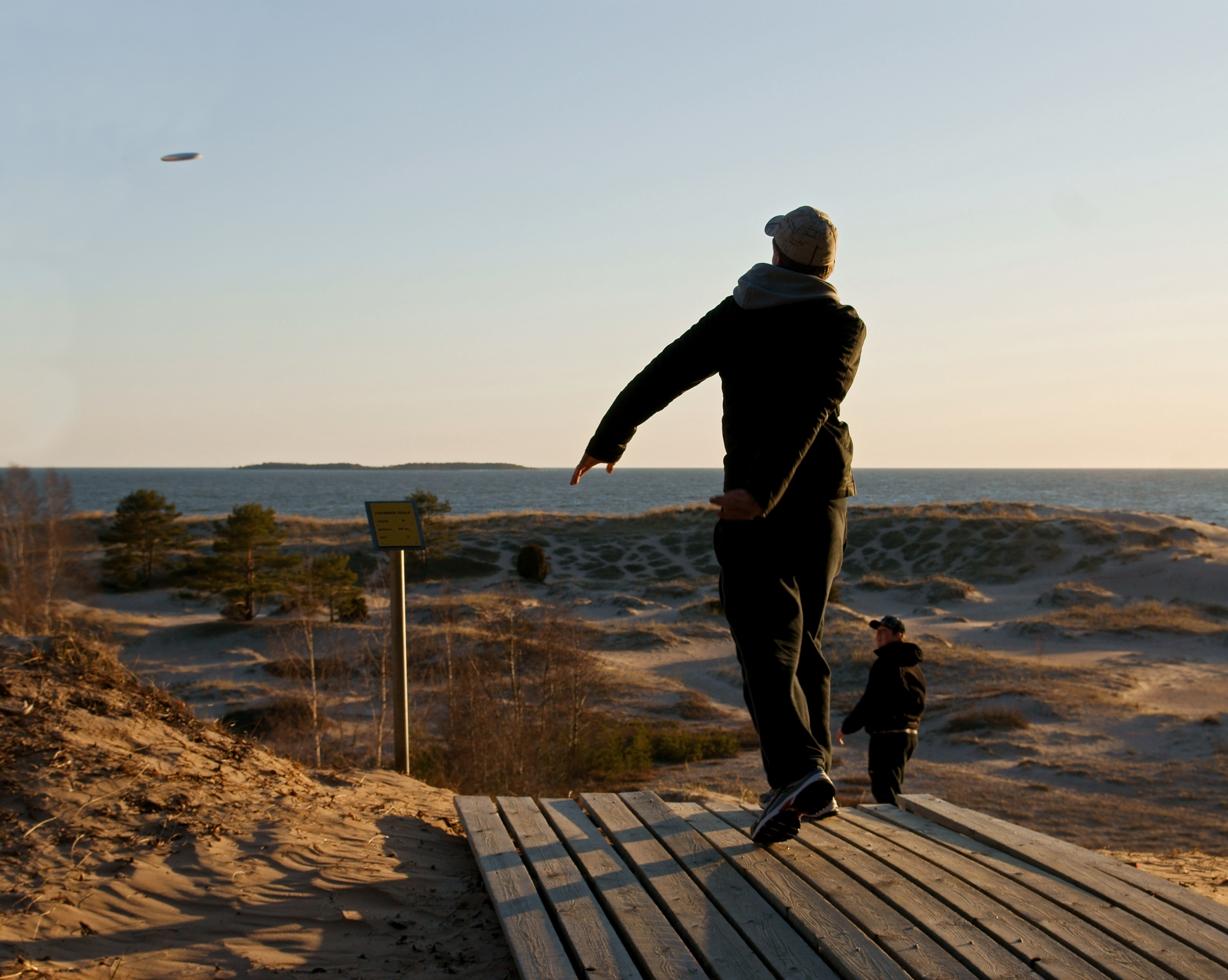
Disc golfers at the now-defunct Yyteri beach course at sunset in Pori

Disc golf courses are marketed by Finnish municipalities and on tourism board websites.

=== Åland Islands ===
In May 2020, Mats Adamczak [se], Åland’s Chairman for the Federation of Small Businesses, approached DiscGolfPark with the ambitious project of turning Åland into a "disc golf island" by building 16 new courses by the end of the summer, one for each municipality in the autonomous region. At the time of the press release, there were only two courses on Åland.

== Mass media ==
Coverage of disc golf tournaments is mainstream in Finland. It is not uncommon for major tournaments and local competitions to get coverage.

=== Television ===
Disc golf gets frequent coverage on national television since the 2005 European Championships. In 2013, the final round of the European Open aired for 90 minutes nationwide on YLE.

=== Podcasts ===
- Frisbeegolf Keskustelu

=== YouTube channels ===
- Disc Golf Finland - 12,200 subscribers and 2,078,572 views
- lcgm8 - 10,100 subscribers and 3,981,505 views
- SkyBlue - 2,900 subscribers and 610,170 views
- Natural Born Disc Golfer - 2,660 subscribers and 131,828 views
- Frisbeegolf Ruka - 1,130 subscribers and 495,144 views
- frisbeegolfradat - 1,630 subscribers and 538 375 views

== Competitions ==
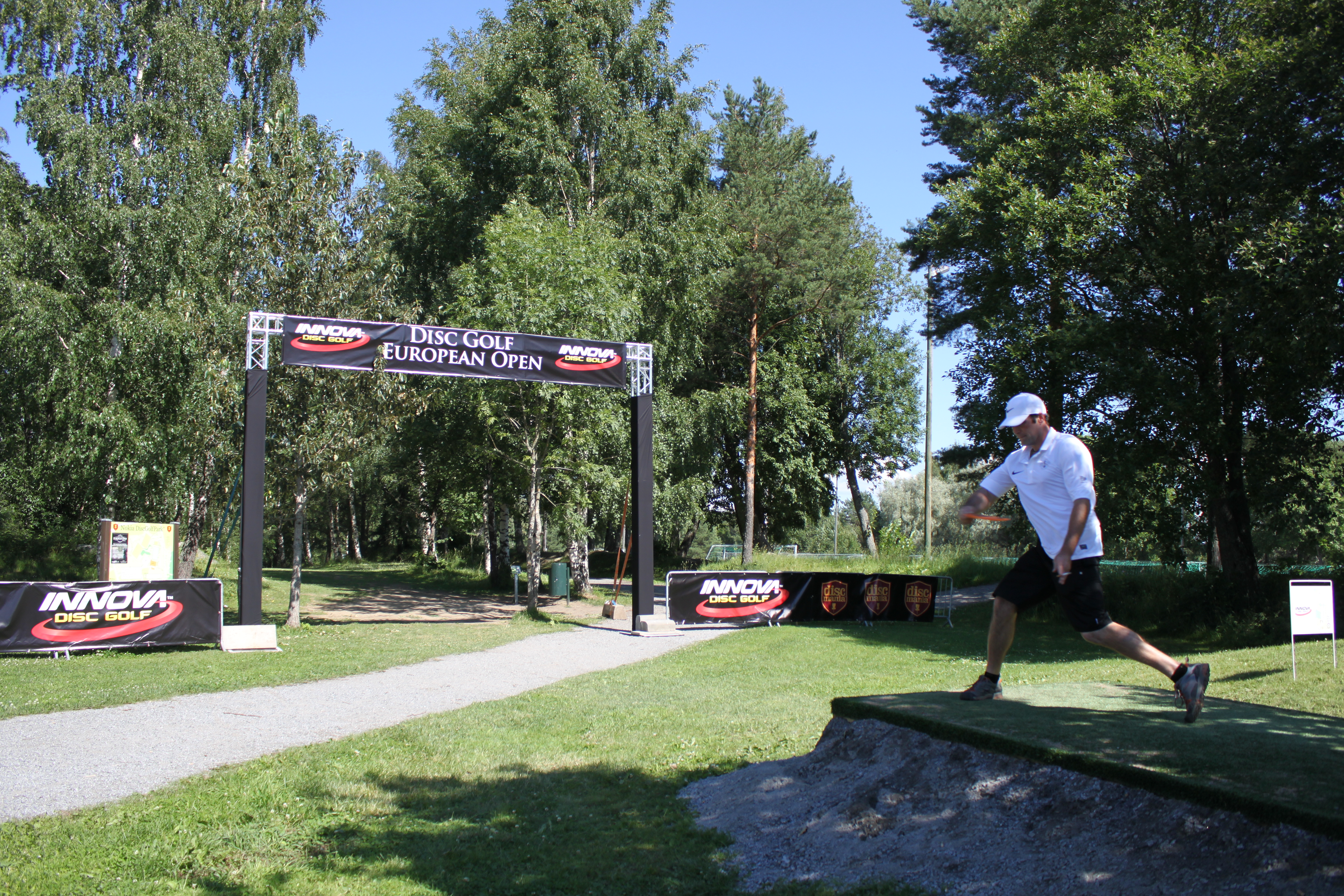
2011 disc golf European Open champion David Feldberg practicing at hole 1

- European Open (disc golf)

== Notable Finnish disc golfers ==
- Niklas Anttila
- Pasi Koivu
- Jussi Meresmaa
- Seppo Paju
- Leo Piironen
- Väinö Mäkelä
- Eveliina Salonen
- Jalle Stoor

== See also ==
- Disc golf in Estonia
- Disc golf in Sweden
- Disc golf in the United States
