= Oak Grove Disc Golf Course =

Disc golf course in Pasadena, California

Coordinates: 34°11′32″N 118°10′34″W

Course information
- Location: Pasadena, California, U.S.
- Elevation: 1,040 feet (320 m)
- Total holes: 22
- Website: www.oakgrovediscgolf.com

Oak Grove Disc Golf Course is a disc golf course located in Hahamongna Watershed Park in Pasadena, California. Established in 1975, it is widely recognized as the world's first permanent disc golf course. The course was designed and developed by disc golf pioneer Ed Headrick, also known as the "father of disc golf".

Over the decades, Oak Grove has become a historic landmark in the disc golf community, drawing players from around the world. It is heavily used and known for its natural terrain, mature oak trees, and evolving layout. The course is maintained through a collaboration between the local disc golf club and the city, with a focus on sustainability and erosion control.
