= List of disc golf courses in Austria =

As of January 2020, there are 19 known disc golf courses in Austria on the official PDGA Course Directory. 10 of them (53%) are full-size courses with 18 holes or more, and 8 of them (42%) are smaller courses that feature at least 9 holes. Austria has 2 courses per million inhabitants.

Disc golf courses in Austria

List of disc golf courses in Austria as of September 2025 (Note: All disc golf courses listed below and their related information were pulled from the PDGA, UDisc, Disc Golf Course Review (DGCR), The Disc Golf Scene (TDGS), Infinite Courses, and local course directories unless referenced otherwise.)
Course	Location	#	Since
Eisenstadt Pfadfinderwiese	Eisenstadt	18	2011
Erholungsgebiet Mannswörth bei Schwechat	Schwechat (Mannswörth)	7	2018
HALL.O Discgolf Linz	Linz	12	2018
Josefhof Disc Golf Course	Graz	12	2012
Rosenhain	Graz	12	2023
Discgolf Mariatrost	Graz	13	2025
Gratwein-Straßengel Disc Golf Parcours	Gratwein-Straßengel	6	2019
Karlingbergergut	Perg	18	2018
KUMM Discgolf Parcours	Sankt Thomas am Blasenstein	18	2011
Leutasch DiscGolfPark	Leutasch	9	2019
Petzen Disc Golf Course	Feistritz ob Bleiburg	18	2018
Rangger Köpfl	Oberperfuss	15	2014
Schmitten Discgolf Parcours	Zell am See	18	2009
Schöckl	Sankt Radegund bei Graz	18	2011
St. Pölten Lions Green Park	Sankt Pölten	9	2019
Sunny Mountain Disc Golf Parcours	Kappl	9	2016
Wiener Prater Disc Golf Parcours	Vienna	18	2011
Ybbs Haus am See	Ybbs an der Donau	13	2014
Ybbs Schleifmuehlbach	Ybbs an der Donau	18	2015

== See also ==
List of disc golf courses in Norway
