= List of disc golf brands and manufacturers =

This is a list of notable disc golf brands and manufacturers.

== Brands ==
Brands	Est.	Based in	Country of manufacture			
Brands	Est.	Based in	Discs	Baskets	Bags	Carts
DGA	1976	California	(United States) (Note: Manufactured by Discraft.)	(China)	Yes	No
Discraft	1978	Michigan	(United States)	Yes	Yes	No
Infinite Discs	2018	Utah	(United States) (Note: Manufactured by Innova.)	No	Yes	No
Innova	1983	California	(United States)	(China)	Yes	No
MVP Disc Sports	2010	Michigan	(United States)	(China)	(China)	Yes
Past Brands	Est.	Based in	Country of manufacture			
Past Brands	Est.	Based in	Discs	Baskets	Bags	Carts
Aerobie	1984	California	(United States)	No	No	No

== See also ==
- Lists of brands – brand-related list articles on Wikipedia
- Lists of companies (category)
- Basket (disc golf)
