= Flaktveit =

Neighborhood of Bergen, Norway

Coordinates: 60°27′49″N 5°21′28″E

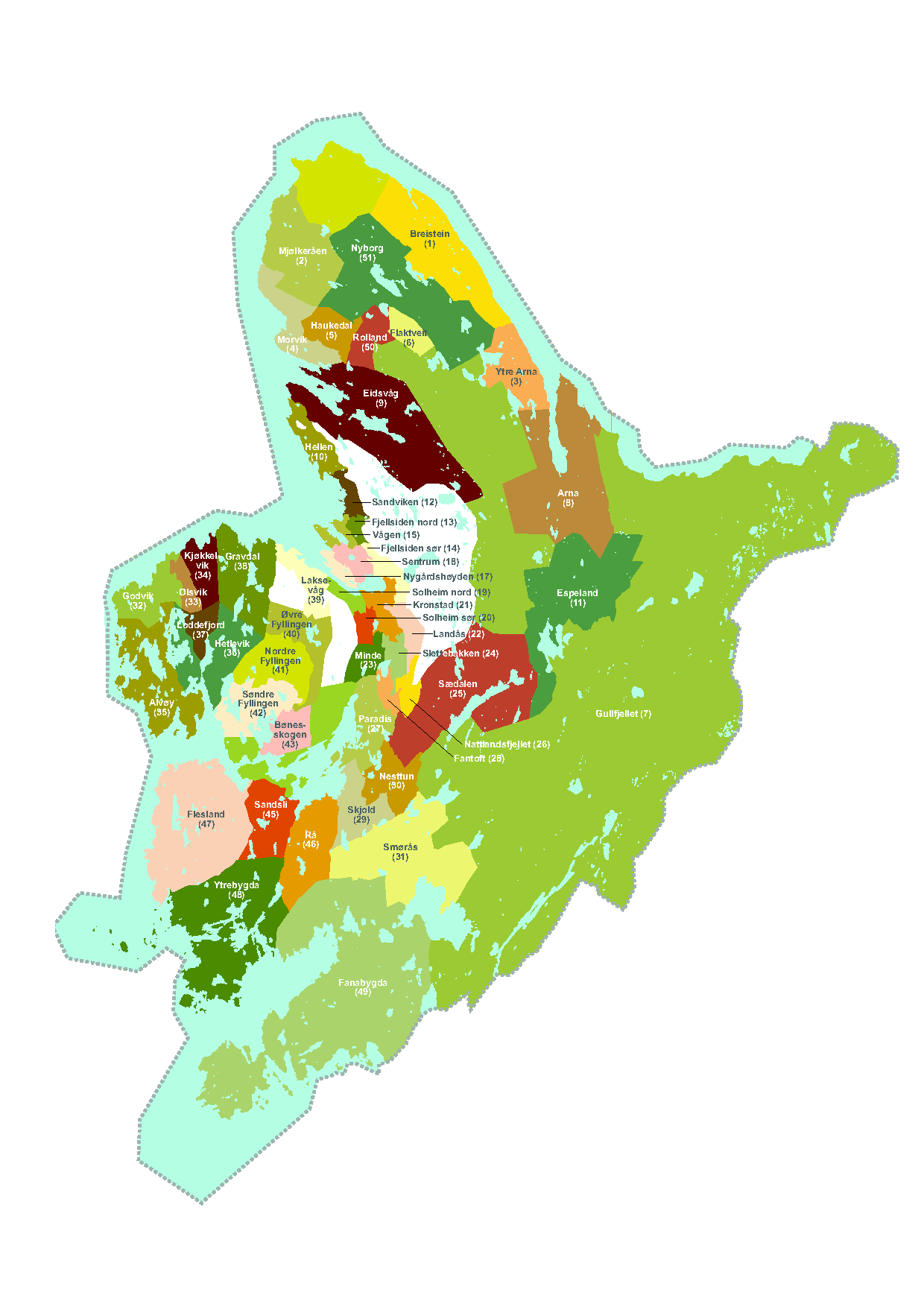
Map of the main neighborhoods of Bergen (#6 is Flaktveit)

Flaktveit is a neighborhood in the city of Bergen in Vestland county, Norway. The neighborhood is located in the borough of Åsane in the northern part of the city. The European route E16/European route E39 highway runs around three sides of the neighborhood, providing easy access to the city centre. The area was a farm until the late-1960s when development began and it is now a large residential area.

Flaktveit is located south of Nyborg, east of Rolland, north of Hjortland, and west of Blindheim. The Breimyra Lower Secondary School, Flaktveit School, and Flaktveit Stadion are all located in the neighborhood. The area consists of the basic statistical units of Flaktveit, Flaktveitrinden, Flaktveittræet, Bekkjarkrokane, and Flaktveitleitet. There were 5,103 residents in this area in 2009.
