= Dave Dunipace =

American businessman and disc golfer

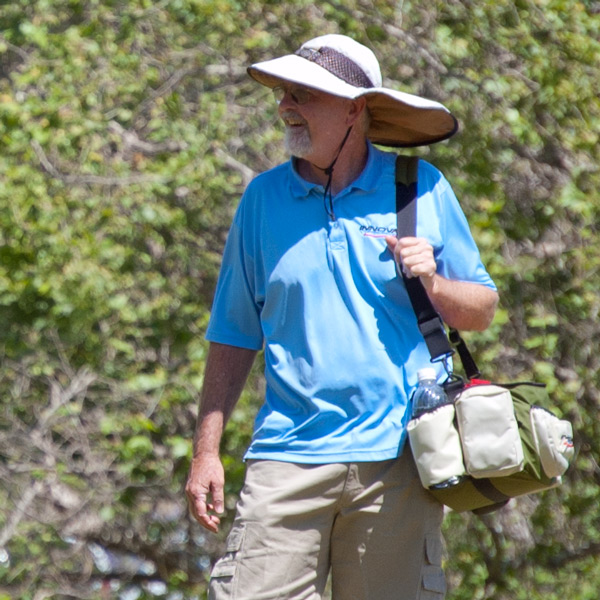
Dave Dunipace

Dave Dunipace is the co-founder and CEO of Innova Discs. The company was founded in 1983 to produce the new triangular rim golf discs he had designed. He was inducted into the inaugural class of the Disc Golf Hall of Fame in 1993 with the following acknowledgment:

“A world-class competitor and coach of champions, Dave Dunipace engineered advances in disc technology that hurtled disc golf into the space age. Thanks to Dave's ingenuity and innovation in flying disc design, today's disc golfers are able to throw the shots of their dreams.”

Dunipace continues to design golf discs for Innova, is still an active competitor in the sport of disc golf and continues to coach world class players.

== Awards and honors ==
- 1980 WFDF World Distance Champion
- 1983 US Open Disc Golf Champion
- 1993 Inductee Disc Golf Hall of Fame
