= Disc golf =

Sport in which players attempt to throw a disc into a target

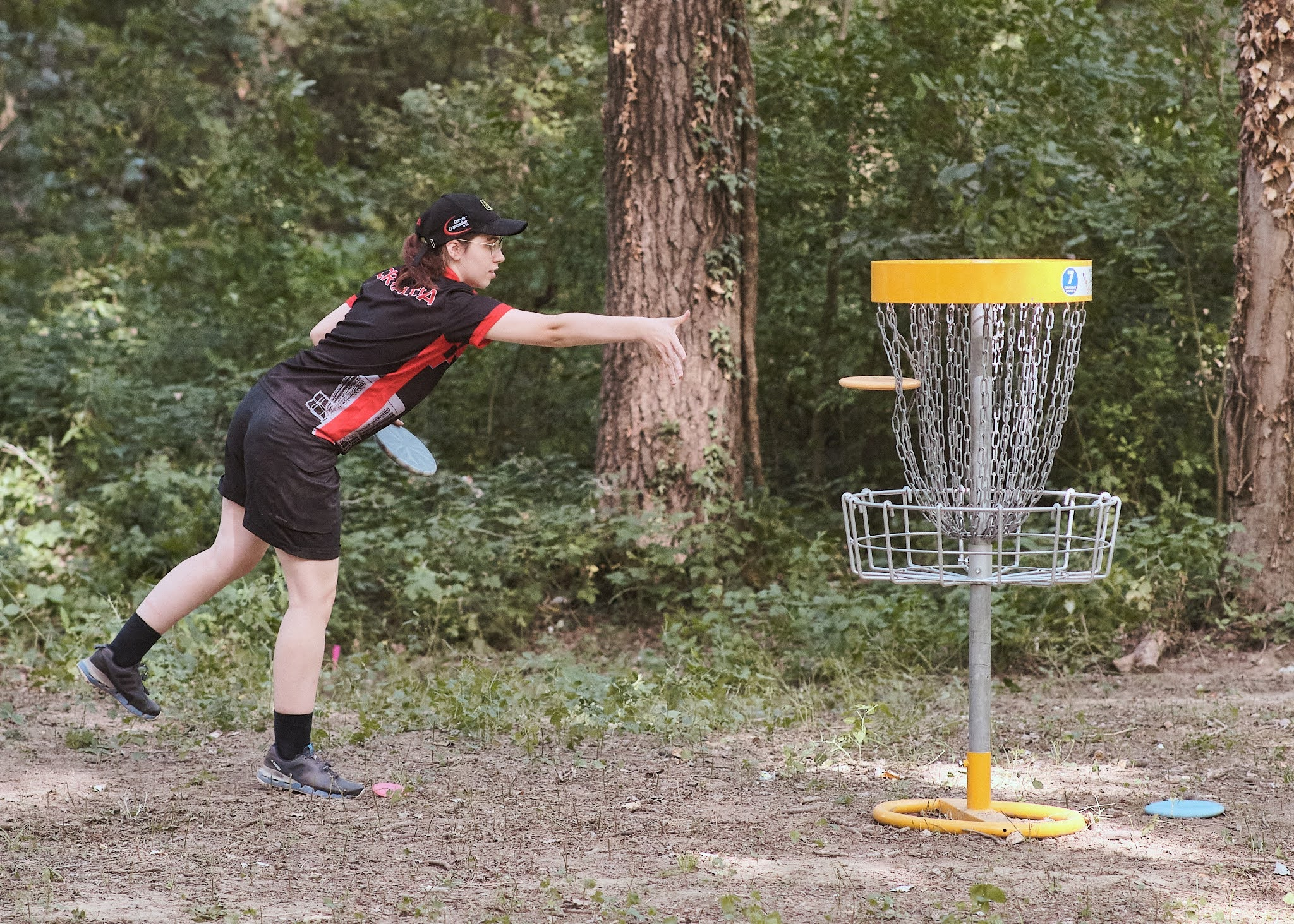
- Highest governing body: Professional Disc Golf Association
- Nicknames: Frisbee golf
- Registered players: 333,400 As of August 2026
- Clubs: Yes

Characteristics
- Contact: No
- Team members: Single competitors, doubles
- Type: Outdoor, passive recreation
- Equipment: Flying disc, target, tee off location
- Glossary: Glossary of disc golf terms

Presence
- Olympic: No
- World Games: 2001, 2025

Disc golf, also known as frisbee golf (Note: The term frisbee golf is discouraged by sports organizations such as the PDGA, due to potential trademark infringement disputes with Wham-O, who own the trademark rights to the Frisbee name.) and frolf, is a flying disc sport in which players throw a disc at a target, using rules similar to golf. The sport is usually played on a course with 9 or 18 holes, each consisting of a teeing area and a target. Players complete a hole by throwing a disc from a tee pad or tee area toward the target (often a basket equipped with chains to catch the disc) and throwing again from where the previous throw came to rest, until the disc comes to rest in the target. The discs used are made with varying characteristics that allow for different flight patterns, and are chosen by the player before each shot depending on the intended flight path. Different throwing styles can also affect the flight of the discs.

The game is played in about 40 countries, and as of 2026, there are 330,400 total members and 112,509 subscribed members of the Professional Disc Golf Association (PDGA) worldwide. According to the UDisc course directory, there are over 16,000 disc golf courses, with roughly 90% being accessible for free.

== Origin and early history ==
Modern disc golf started in the early 1960s, but there is debate over who invented the sport. The consensus is that multiple groups of people played independently throughout the 1960s. Students at Rice University in Houston, Texas, for example, held tournaments with trees as targets as early as 1964, and in the early 1960s, players in Pendleton King Park in Augusta, Georgia, would toss Frisbees into 50-gallon barrel trash cans designated as targets. In 1968 Frisbee Golf was also played in Alameda Park in Santa Barbara, California, by teenagers in the Anacapa and Sola street areas. Gazebos, water fountains, lamp posts, and trees were all part of the course. This took place for several years and an Alameda Park collectors edition disc still exists, though rare, as few were made. Clifford Towne from this group went on to hold a National Time Aloft record.

=== 1970s ===
Ed Headrick, also known as "Steady" Ed Headrick, (June 28, 1924 – August 12, 2002) was an American toy inventor. He is most well known as the father of both the modern-day Frisbee and of the sport and game of disc golf.

In 1975, Headrick's tenure at Wham-O where he helped redesign the flying disc known as the frisbee ended, and ties between Headrick and Wham-O eventually split. Headrick left the company to start out on his own to focus all his efforts on his new interest, which he coined and trademarked "Disc Golf".

In 1976, "Steady" Ed Headrick and his son Ken Headrick started the first disc golf company, the Disc Golf Association (DGA). The purpose of DGA was to manufacture discs and baskets and to formalize the sport. The first disc golf target was Ed's pole hole design which consisted of a pole sticking out of the ground.

== Courses ==
Most disc golf courses have 9 or 18 holes, and exceptions most often have holes in multiples of three. Courses with 6, 10, 12, 21, 24 or 27 holes are not uncommon. The PDGA recommends that courses average 200–400 ft (61–122 m) per hole, with holes no shorter than 100 ft (30 m). The longest holes in the world measure more than 1,500 ft (460 m) long. Course designers use trees, bushes, elevation changes, water hazards, and distance variation, along with out-of-bounds zones and mandatory flight paths (often referred to as "Mandos") to make each hole challenging and unique. Many courses include multiple tee positions or multiple target positions to cater to players of different ability levels.

Most disc golf courses are built in more natural and less manicured environments than traditional golf courses and require minimal maintenance, although some courses aim for pristine conditions. Professional course designers consider safety a critical factor in course design, and are careful to minimize the danger of being hit by a flying disc while providing designs that create strategy in play and variety in shots for enjoyment. Holes are designed to require a range of different throws to challenge players with different strengths or particular skills. Many courses are central organizing points for local disc golf clubs, and some include shops selling disc golf equipment. More than 80% of the courses listed on Disc Golf Course Review are listed as public and free to play.

=== List by country ===
Three countries account for 85% of all disc golf courses worldwide: the United States (75%), Finland (7%) and Canada (3%). Other notable countries include Sweden and Estonia, which has the highest density of disc golf courses per km^{2} of dry land of any country and the second-highest number of courses per capita. Iceland and Finland have 150 and 111 courses per million inhabitants, respectively. Outside the North American and European continents, Japan, Australia, New Zealand, and South Korea have the most courses. There are disc golf courses on every continent, including 24 in Latin America, 8 in Africa, and one in Antarctica. Åland is the region with the densest concentration of Disc golf courses in the world, with one course in each of the 16 municipalities of Åland, which could theoretically be completed over 20 hours.

Asterisk (*) indicates "Disc golf in country or territory" links.

Country	Disc golf courses	as % of world total	per 1M inhabitants	per 10,000 km^{2} of dry land	Distribution # Holes (18+ 9+ <9)
United States *	7,379	73%	21.1	4.5	
Finland *	1000	9.9%	175.2	32.9	
Canada	360	3.6%	8.8	0.4	
Sweden	242	2.4%	22.5	5.9	
Estonia *	150	1.5%	105.2	35.4	
Germany	129	1.3%	1.5	3.7	
Norway	124	1.2%	21.7	4.1	
United Kingdom	107	1.1%	1.5	4.4	
Czechia	99	1%	8.8	12.8	
France	97	1%	1.4	1.5	
Australia	89	0.9%	3.3	0.1	
Denmark	76	0.8%	12.5	17.9	
Japan	75	0.7%	0.6	2.1	
Iceland	62	0.6%	150.4	6.2	
New Zealand	49	0.5%	9.2	1.9	
Switzerland	36	0.4%	3.9	9	
Austria	21	0.2%	2.2	2.5	
Netherlands	21	0.2%	1.1	6.2	
Spain	17	0.2%	0.4	0.3	
South Korea	16	0.2%	0.3	1.6	
Poland	12	0.1%	0.3	0.4	
Slovakia	12	0.1%	2.1	2.5	
Rest of the world	-70	-0.7%			
Total	10,103	Source:			

=== Tees ===
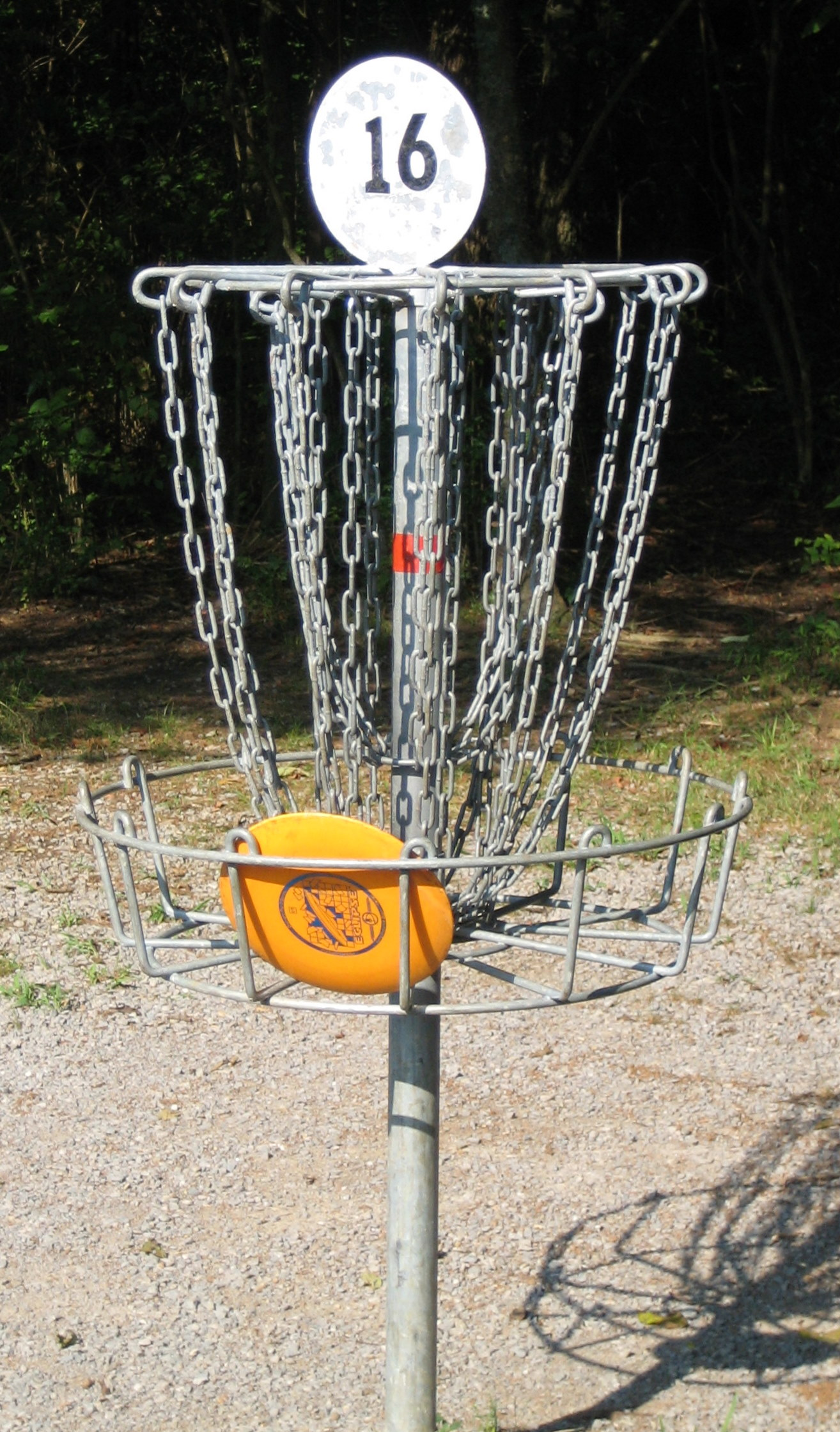
A disc resting in a basket, the most common type of target.

A disc golf tee (commonly referred to as a tee pad, tee box or the box) is the starting position of a hole. The PDGA recommends that the tee area be no smaller than 1.2 meters wide by 3 meters long, allowing ample space to run up and release the disc. The tee box is usually a pad of concrete, asphalt, rubber, gravel, or artificial turf. Some courses have natural turf with only the front of the tee position marked. In rare instances, there are no tee boxes and players begin from a general location based on the course layout.

=== Signs ===
Established courses have tee signs near each tee position. Signs may depict a simple map of the hole including the tee, target, expected disc flight, out-of-bounds areas, water hazards, trees, and mandatory paths. Signs typically include the distance to the hole and par. Some courses include a unique name for the hole and may have sponsor logos. Many courses include a larger sign near the course entrance which has a map of the entire course.

=== Targets ===
Although early courses were played using trees, fence posts, or park equipment as the target, standard disc golf baskets are by far the most common type of target on modern courses. Some courses feature tone targets that are designed to make a distinctive sound when hit with a disc. Disc golf baskets are constructed with a central pole holding a basket under an assembly of hanging chains. When a disc hits the chains, it is often, but not always, deflected into the basket. Per PDGA rules, in order to complete a hole with a basket target, the disc must come to rest supported by the tray or the chains below the chain support. There are many different brands of baskets made by numerous manufacturers.

== Gameplay ==
A player putting into a basket

The sport of disc golf is set up similar to a game of golf. A "round" is played on a disc golf course consisting of a number of "holes", usually 9 or 18. Each hole includes a tee position for starting play and a disc golf target some distance away, often with obstacles such as trees, hills or bodies of water in between. Players begin by throwing a disc from the tee, without crossing over the front of the tee prior to releasing the disc when throwing. This could lead to a fault similar to a bowling foot fault in cricket. Players then navigate the hole by picking up the disc where it comes to rest and throwing again until they reach the target. The object of the game is to get through the course with the lowest number of total throws. Play is usually in groups of five or fewer, with each player taking turn at the tee box, then progressing with the player furthest from the hole throwing first, while the other players stand aside.

Each course is unique, and so requires a different combination of throws to complete, with the best players aiming to shape the flight of the disc to account for distance, terrain, obstacles and weather. In order to facilitate making different shots, players carry a variety of discs with different flight characteristics, choosing an appropriate disc for each throw. Some players also carry a mini marker disc, used to accurately mark the throwing position before each throw. Use of mini marker discs is particularly prevalent in formal competitive play.

Many courses include out-of-bounds areas, commonly called "OB zones" or just "OB". If the disc lands in these areas, the player is usually required to add a penalty throw onto their score and continue play from near where the disc entered the out-of-bounds zone. Some courses include out-of-bounds areas with special rules requiring the player to resume play from a specified area called a drop zone or requiring the player to restart the hole from the tee. Some courses also include Mandatories (also called "Mandos") which require the path of the disc to be above, below or to one side of a specific line indicated by a sign.

By tradition, players throw from the tee box in the order of their score on the previous hole, with the lowest scorer throwing first. Most players also follow a loose code of courtesy while playing, which includes norms such as standing out of the sight line of the throwing player and avoiding making distracting noises. Because a thrown disc could injure someone, the Professional Disc Golf Association recommends that players "Never throw into a blind area or when spectators, pedestrians or facility users are within range."

Formal competitive play is governed by the PDGA Official Rules of Disc Golf and the PDGA Competition Manual for Disc Golf events.

== Disc types ==
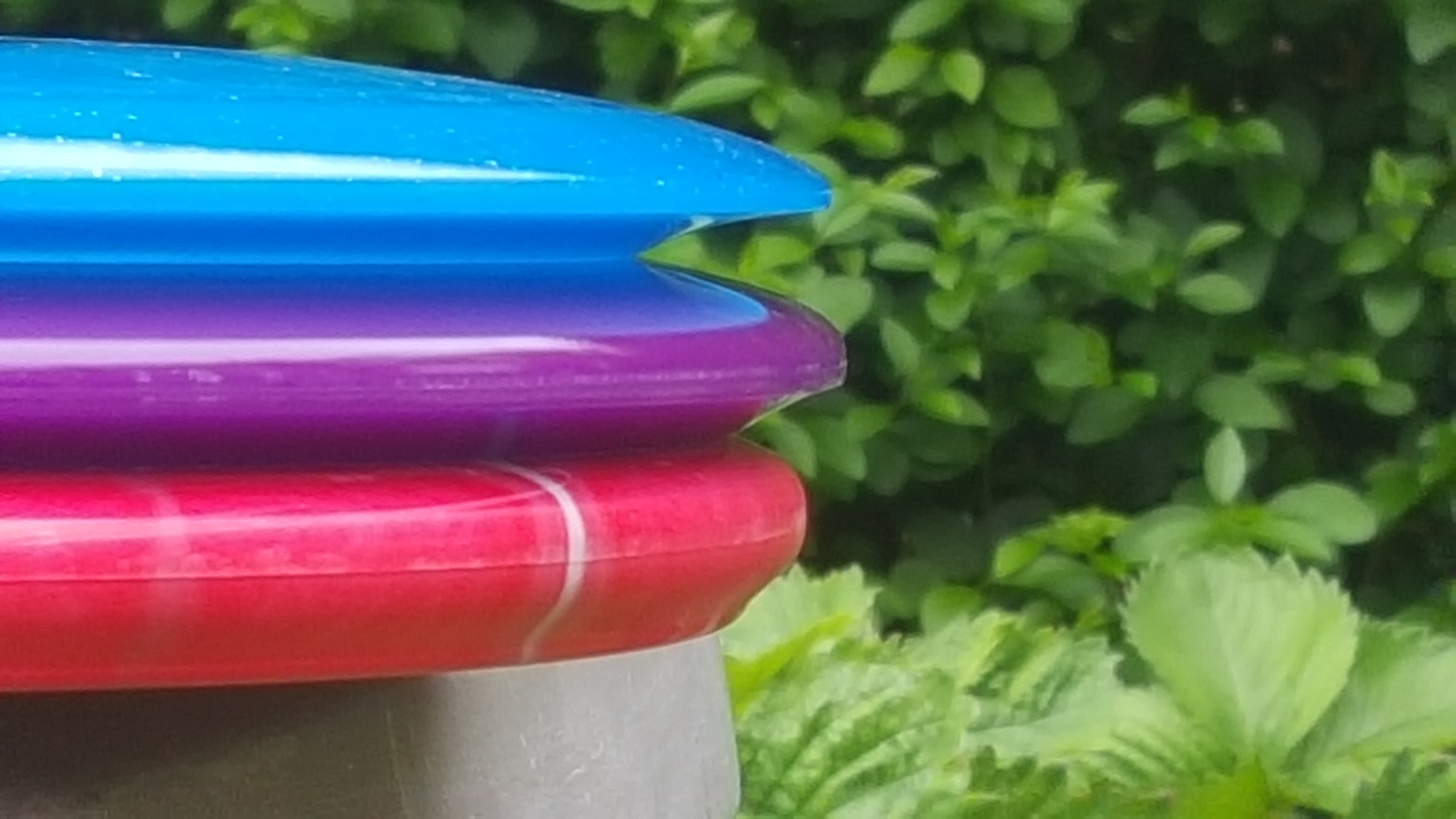
Three discs showcasing different edge profiles. From top to bottom: a driver, a mid-range, and a putter.

Disc golf discs are smaller than Ultimate flying discs or general-purpose recreational frisbees. They typically measure 21–22 cm (8.3–8.7 in) in diameter and weigh 130–180 g (4.6–6.3 oz). All PDGA-approved discs measure 21–30 cm (8.3–11.8 in) in diameter and weigh no more than 200 g (7.1 oz). Discs used for disc golf are designed and shaped for control, speed, and accuracy, while general-purpose flying discs, such as those used for playing guts or ultimate, have a more traditional shape, similar to a catch disc. There is a wide variety of discs used in disc golf and they are generally divided into three categories: drivers, mid-range discs, and putters.

=== Driver ===
Drivers are recognized by their sharp, beveled edge and have most of their mass concentrated on the outer rim of the disc rather than distributed equally throughout. They are optimized for aerodynamics and designed to travel maximum distances at high speeds. They are typically thrown by experienced players during tee-off and other long distance fairway throws.

Some disc brands further sub-divide their drivers into different categories. For example, Innova has Distance Drivers and Fairway Drivers, with a fairway driver being somewhere between a distance driver and a mid-range disc. Discraft has three categories of drivers: Long Drivers, Extra Long Drivers, and Maximum Distance Drivers. Another type of driver, used less frequently, is a roller. As the name indicates, it has an edge designed to roll rather than fly. (Although any disc can be used for a roller, some behave quite differently than others).

The world record distance for a disc golf throw is held by David Wiggins Jr., with a distance of 1,108.92 ft (338.00 m) on March 28, 2016. He broke the previous record of 863.5 ft (263.2 m), thrown by Simon Lizotte on October 25, 2014.

=== Mid-range ===
Mid-range discs feature a dull, beveled edge and a moderate rim width. They offer more control than drivers, but they have a smaller range. Mid-range discs are typically used as approach discs. Beginner players will often use mid-ranges instead of drivers at tee-off, as they require less strength and technique to fly straight than higher speed drivers.

=== Putter ===
Putters are designed to fly straight, predictably, and very slowly compared to mid-range discs and drivers. They are typically used for tight, controlled shots that are close to the basket, although some players use them for short drives where trees or other obstacles come into play. Additionally, higher speed discs will not fly properly without a fast enough release snap, so a putter or mid-range with lower snap requirements is more forgiving and will behave in a more regular way. Professional players often carry multiple putters with varying flight characteristics.

=== Stability ===
Stability is the measurement of a disc's tendency to bank laterally during its flight. A disc that is over-stable will tend to track left (for a right-handed, backhand throw), whereas a disc that is under-stable will tend to track right (also for a right-handed, backhand throw). The stability rating of the discs differs depending on the manufacturer of the disc. Innova Discs rate stability as "turn" and "fade". "Turn" references how the disc will fly at high speed during the beginning and middle of its flight, and is rated on a scale of +1 to −5, where +1 is the most overstable and −5 is the most understable. "Fade" references how the disc will fly at lower speeds towards the end of its flight, and is rated on a scale of 0 to 6, where 0 has the least fade, and 6 has the most fade. For example, a disc with a turn of −5 and fade of 0 will fly to the right (for right handed, backhand throw) the majority of its flight then curl back minimally left at the end. A disc with a turn of −1 and a fade of +3 will turn slightly right during the middle of its flight and turn hard left as it slows down. These ratings can be found on the discs themselves or from the manufacturer's web site. Discraft prints the stability rating on all discs and also provides this information on their web site. The stability ranges from 3 to −2 for Discraft discs; however Discraft's ratings are more of a combination of turn and fade with the predominance being fade.

Spin (rotation) has little influence on lift and drag forces but impacts a disc's stability during flight. Imagine a spinning top: a gentle nudge will knock it off its axis of rotation momentarily, but it will not topple over because spin adds gyroscopic stability. In the same way, a flying disc resists rolling (flipping over) because spin adds gyroscopic stability. A flying disc will maintain its spin rate even as it loses velocity. Toward the end of a disc's flight, when the spin and velocity lines cross, a flying disc will predictably begin to fade. The degree to which a disc will fade depends on its pitch angle and design.

=== Plastics ===
There are dozens of different types of plastic used for making discs by the various disc manufacturers. The type of plastic affects the feel of the disc's grip as well as its durability, which in turn can influence flight as the disc becomes worn. Manufacturers market lower-cost “base” blends (e.g., DX, J-Pro, Pro-D, X-Line, D-line, Retro, R-Pro) and “premium” blends (e.g., Champion, Titanium, FLX, GStar, Gold Line, Tournament Plastic, Fuzion, Star), with premium lines described by manufacturers as more durable than base blends. Some variants incorporate additional features, such as glow-in-the-dark additives or buoyant plastics. Many companies also offer lighter-weight plastics (often aerated) that may be used by players with lower release speed. Bright-colored discs can be easier to locate in vegetation. The commercial production process is typically injection molding for its low unit cost and reliability. For prototyping and small-scale offerings, 3D printing is a growing option; PDGA-approved 3D-printed designs are available from some companies and often employ polymers such as TPU or proprietary blends.

=== Stamps ===
Stamps refer to the artwork or lettering that appears on a disc. Stamps can appear on the top or the bottom of a disc. Stamps are applied by disc manufacturers by using a hot stamp machine, usually with foil. Stamps not only serve a creative design purpose, but are also used to identify different disc molds.

== Throwing styles ==
While there are many grips and styles for throwing a disc, two common techniques are backhand and forehand (also called sidearm). Many players use a run-up during drives to build momentum. Throwing styles vary by player, and there is no single standard.

All discs when thrown will naturally fall to a certain direction determined by the rotation direction of the disc when released. This direction is termed hyzer, the natural fall of the disc, or anhyzer, making the disc fall against its natural flight pattern. For a right-handed backhand throw (RHBH), the disc will naturally fall to the left. For a right-handed forehand throw (RHFH), the disc will naturally fall to the right. For a left-handed, backhand throw (LHBH), the disc will naturally fall to the right. For a left-handed, forehand throw (LHFH), the disc will naturally fall to the left.

=== Backhand ===
In a backhand throw, the disc is drawn across the front of the body and released toward a forward aimpoint. The technique can generate high spin and may result in greater distance than a forehand throw. Power is created by initiating momentum from the feet and allowing it to travel up the body, hips, and shoulders, culminating in the transfer of energy to the disc.

=== Forehand ===
The forehand, or sidearm, throw is performed by drawing the disc from behind and partially across the front of the body, similar to a sidearm throw in baseball.

=== Alternative throws ===
The following examples of throws may be used to better deliver a disc where the former common two throws would be impeded by obstacles such as bushes, trees, boulders, or artificial structures.

Common alternative styles

- The Hatchet (or Tomahawk): Gripped similarly to the sidearm toss but thrown with an overhand motion; the disc orientation is nearly perpendicular to the ground over much of the flight.
- The Thumber: Thrown in an overhand manner but with thumb held on the disc's underside.
- The Roller: Thrown either backhand or forehand, the disc travels primarily along the ground on its edge at a slight angle and can cover long distances in suitable conditions.
- The Turbo putt: The disc is held vertically with the thumb beneath the center and released with an upward pushing motion, somewhat like lifting a platter. The wrist typically remains stable; follow-through imparts spin. The turbo putt is generally used at short range.

Other alternative styles

- The Baseball or Grenade: Thrown as in the backhand, but with the disc upside-down. This shot is used often to get up and down on a short shot where there is danger of a shot rolling away or going out of bounds if thrown too far. Primarily used on downhill shots but can be used to go up and over. Also due to the quick turn and backspin of this shot, it is sometimes used to get out of the woods.
- The Overhand wrist flip: This is a very difficult and stylized throw with which accomplished free-stylers and classic ultimate players are familiar; it is less used in disc golf. It is thrown in the same manner as the "baseball" but drawn on the sidearm side of the body, and by inverting the arm and disc. Using the thumb as the power finger, the disc is drawn from the thigh area rearwards and up from behind the body to over the shoulder, releasing toward a forward aimpoint. The disc flies in a conventional flight pattern.

== Scoring ==
Stroke play is the most common scoring method used in the sport but there are many other forms. These include match play, skins, speed golf and captain's choice, which in disc golf is referred to as "doubles" (not to be confused with partner or team play).

Regardless of which form of play the participants choose, the main objectives of disc golf are conceptually the same as traditional golf in the sense that players follow the same scorekeeping technique.

Scoring terms for a single hole:

- Condor – Where a player is four throws under par, or "-4".
- Albatross (or double-eagle) – Where a player is three throws under par, or "-3".
- Eagle (or double-birdie) – Where a player is two throws under par, or "-2".
- Birdie – Where a player is one throw under par, or "-1".
- Par – Where a player has thrown par, "E" or "0".
- Bogey – Where a player is one throw over par, or "+1".
- Double Bogey – Where a player is two throws over par, or "+2".
- Triple Bogey – Where a player is three throws over par, or "+3".

Doubles play is a unique style of play that many local courses offer on a weekly basis. In this format, teams of two golfers are determined. Sometimes this is done by random draw, and other times it is a pro-am format. On the course, it is a "best-disc" scramble, meaning both players throw their tee shot and then decide which lie they would like to play. Both players then play from the same lie, again choosing which lie is preferable. The World Amateur Doubles Format includes best shot, alternate shot, best score (players play singles and take the best result from the hole) and worst shot (both players must sink the putt).

== Tournaments ==
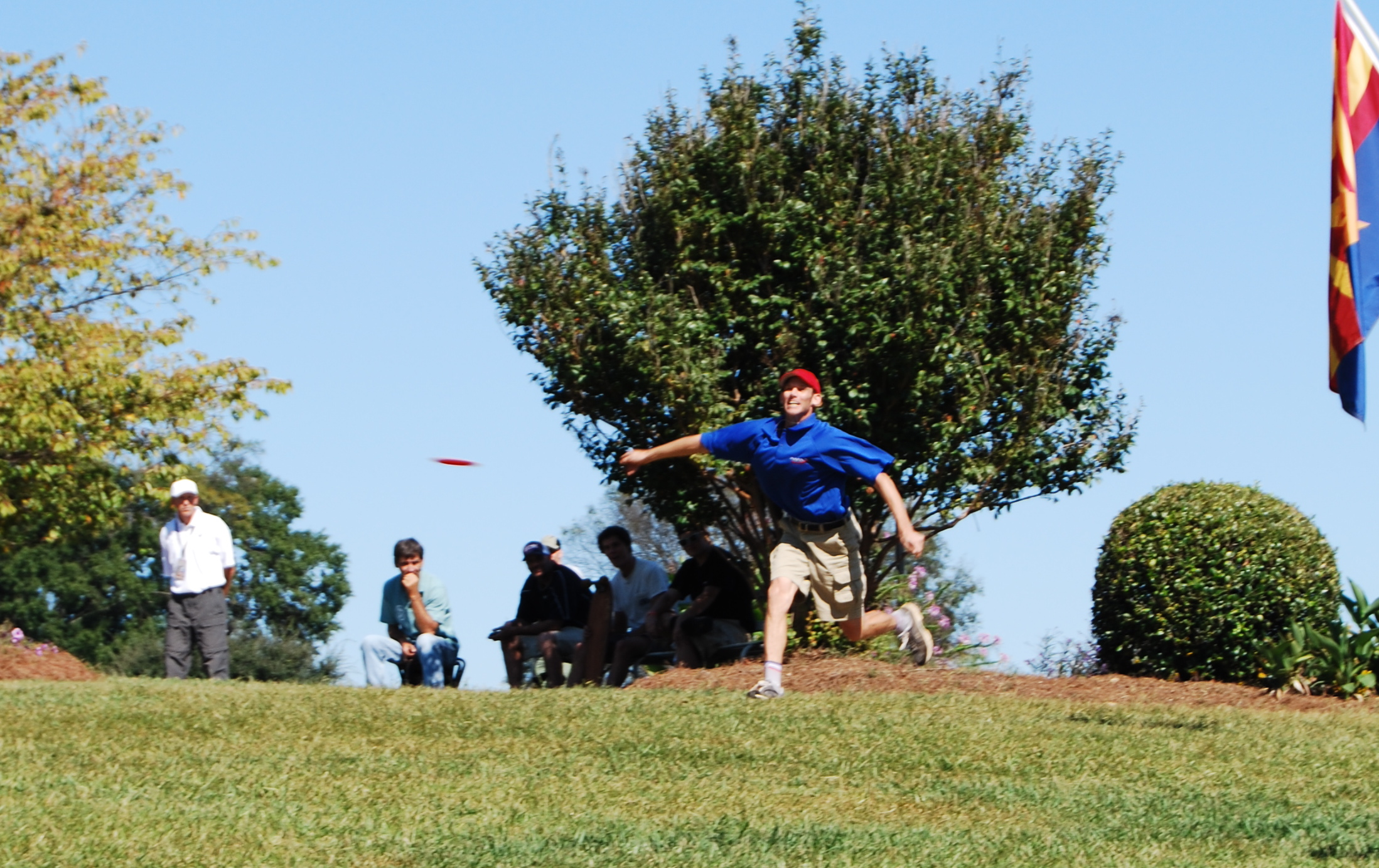
Ken Climo teeing off at hole 5 of the 2008 USDGC.

Tournaments are held nationwide and yearlong in the United States. Sanctioned Tournament play is communicated through the Professional Disc Golf Association Membership. The PDGA provides international, professional, and amateur disc golf tournaments as well as communicates event results, opinions and other information beneficial to the sport via electronic and printed media. In 1982 the PDGA hosted the first World Championship Tournament. Since then, the World Championships have been held in 17 different American states, as well as Toronto, Ontario. One of the largest disc golf tournaments is the United States Disc Golf Championship, held in October in Rock Hill, South Carolina.

As a show of the year-round sustainability of the sport, annual winter tournaments, known as Ice Bowls, are held at courses around the world. Using the motto "No Wimps, No Whiners", Ice Bowls collectively create sport awareness and are considered charity events that typically benefit a local food bank. The official website reports that the 2010 Ice Bowls raised over $250,000 and donated over 67,000 pounds of food in the 222 tournaments for the year. Other charitable tournaments include the annual St. Jude Disc Golf Tournament which started in 2017 and has raised over $100,000 for St. Jude Children's Research Hospital.

=== Player Ratings ===
In 1988, Professional Disc Golf Association (PDGA) Commissioner Jim Challas believed there needed to be a handicap system similar to traditional ball golf. After forwarding this information to disc golfer Chuck Kennedy, however, Kennedy had something else in mind. Kennedy's idea consisted of creating a system that consisted of competitive, yet fair divisions while not having to change the scores like a normal handicapping system. Thus resulting in the player rating system we still have today.

A player rating is a number that compares your average round scores to the course rating of each course you have played in competition. This course rating is typically known as the Scratch Scoring Averages (SSA). For this comparison, players who average the SSA of the courses they have played will receive a rating of 1000. Since their average met the SSA, they are considered "scratch players". For players who average lower than the SSA, their rating will be over 1000.

To get one's results entered into the ratings system, one will need to enter a PDGA sanctioned event. This will be posted on the player profile along with the tournament results the next time the ratings are updated. Also, after just one valid tournament, the first rating can be calculated. However, the only ratings published are those of current PDGA members.

There are a variety of skill level ranges that players are placed in based on their player rating. These ranges are: Green (under rating 825), Red (825+), White (875+), Blue (925+), and Gold (970+). These ratings should reflect the courses being played to challenge players. It is also common to move a step up in difficulty in higher tier events.

== Popularity ==
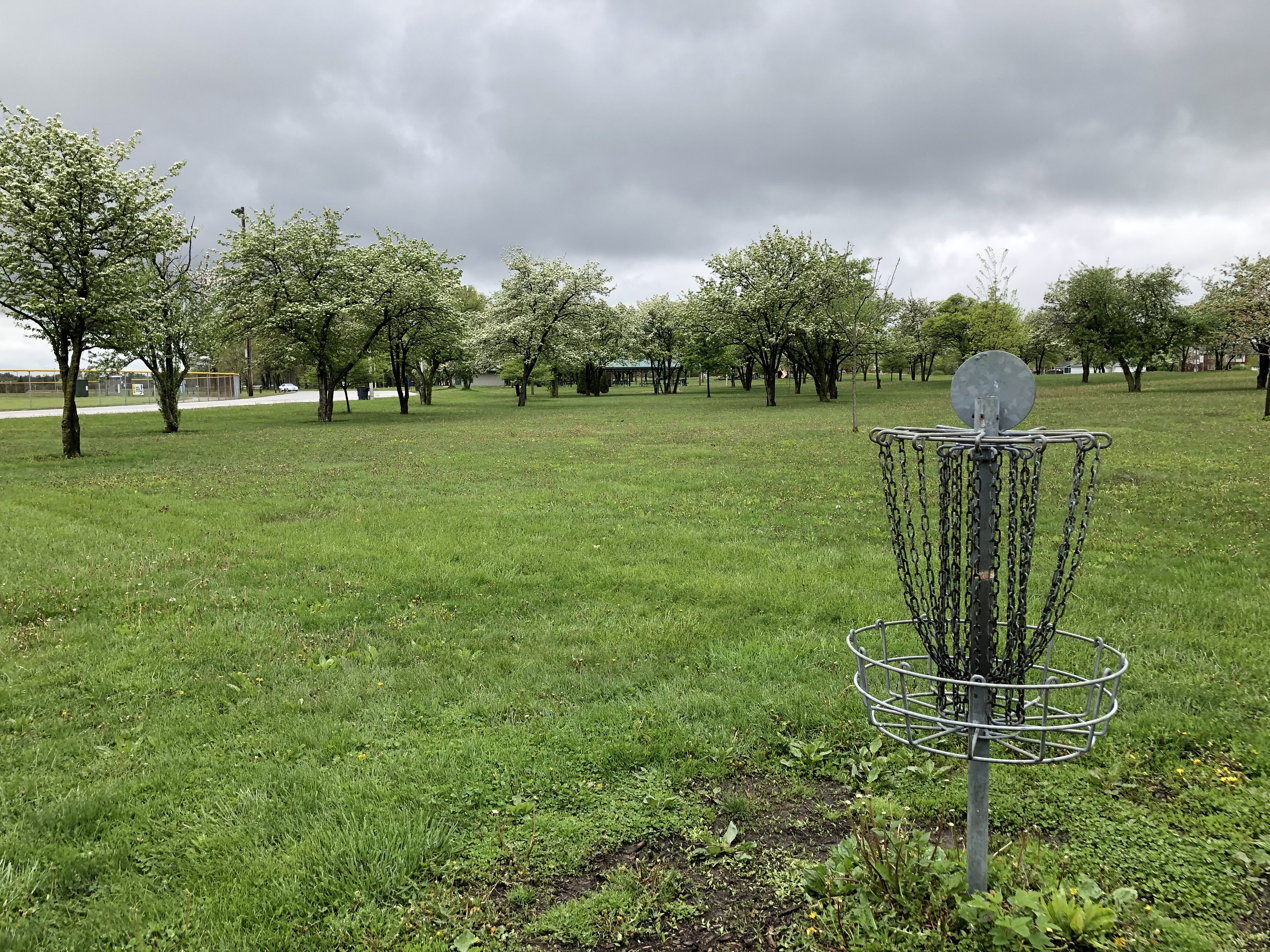
A disc golf course in a public park.

A website that tracks courses worldwide along with their opening dates has shown a rapid increase in installed permanent courses with an average of more than 1000 new courses added each year between 2020 and 2025. The site lists 16,267 courses worldwide as of December 2024.

During the COVID-19 pandemic, as shutdowns and social distancing forced people to avoid indoor gatherings, disc golf experienced significant growth. Televised events were broadcast on CBS Sports and ESPN2 for the first time.

Although most players play on a casual, amateur level, the professional disc golf scene is also growing rapidly, with the top professionals playing full-time and earning their livings through tournament winnings and sponsorship from equipment manufacturers. Online viewership of major tournaments and events has increased rapidly, with coverage of the 2019 world championship achieving more than 3 million views on YouTube, and a clip of an albatross by professional Philo Brathwaite gaining more than 1.4 million views.

=== Post-round coverage ===
Increased popularity of disc golf can be largely attributed to increased coverage of pro tour events, available for free on YouTube. Jomez Productions, Gatekeeper Media, and Go Throw (formerly GKPro) all film events the day of, and then air them the morning after. Often, these videos can have a reach of as many as 200,000 viewers. Jomez's coverage of the final round of the 2019 World Championships has more than 5.5 million YouTube views. In the 2020 season, Jomez Productions and the Disc Golf Pro Tour reached an agreement with CBS Sports and ESPN 2 to air post production coverage of a tournament on each network. The Dynamic Discs Open was shown on CBS Sports, and the Disc Golf Pro Tour championship was re-aired on ESPN2 November 24, 2020. With 225,000 viewers, it was the most-watched show on the channel that day.

=== Women in disc golf ===
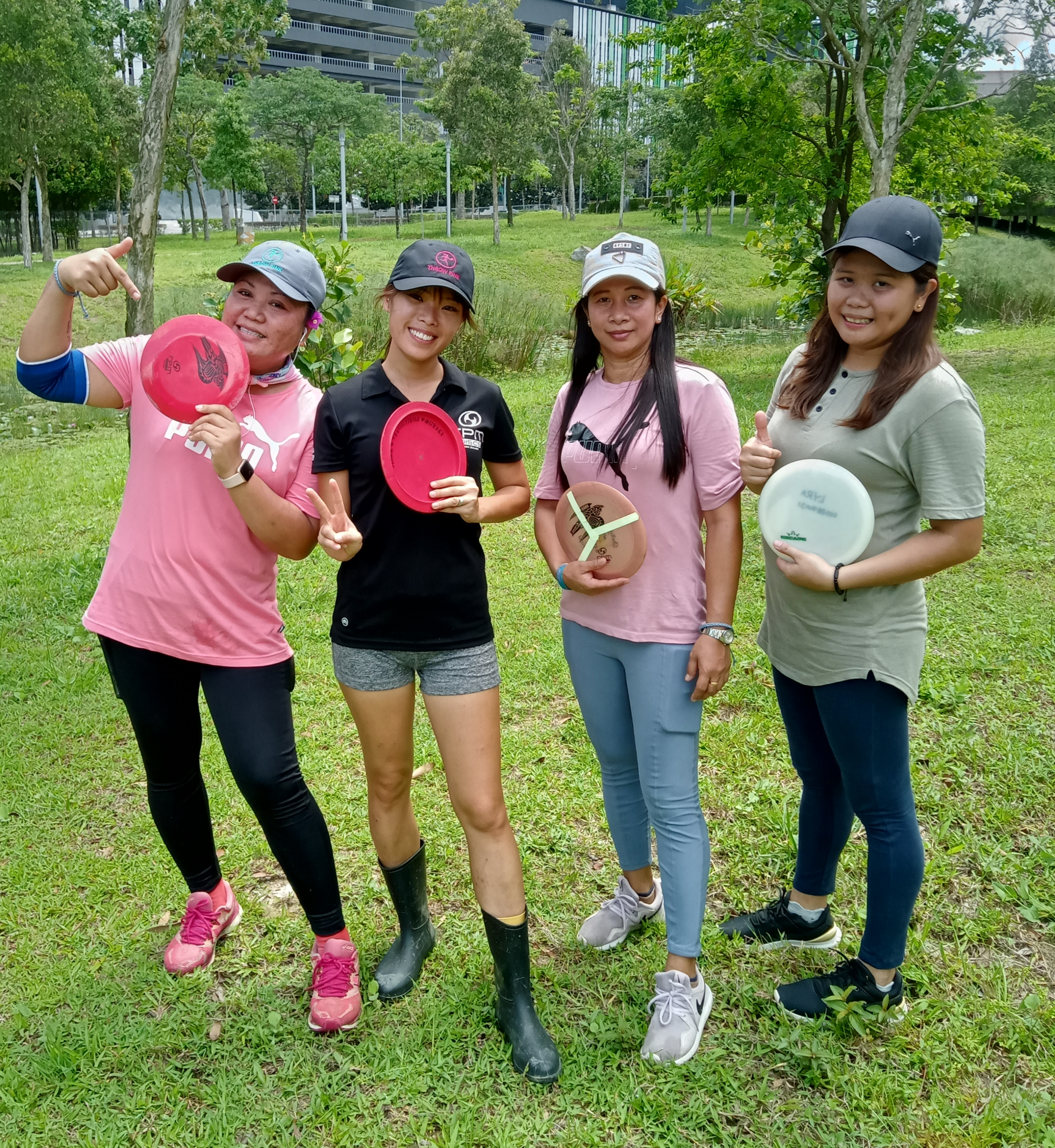
Women at the 2021 WGE event in Malaysia.

While there are more male than female players, the Women's Disc Golf Association exists to encourage female players and arrange women's tournaments. A PDGA survey from 2020 states that out of its 71,016 active members, 4,752 are female.

Several companies have started programs and websites to help attract women to the sport. The PDGA Women's Committee is "Dedicated to Attract, Encourage, and Retain Female Participation in Organized Disc Golf Events". The PDGA Women's Committee set historical records on 12 May 2012 by running the Inaugural Women's Global Event that attracted 636 female players in 24 states and 4 countries. The Women's Global Event was expected to take place every two years from 2014, with hopes of increasing the number of participants. The 2021 Women's Global Event had 99 registered tournaments that spanned the globe, from Minnesota to Malaysia, with a combined turnout of 3224 women competing in 23 different PDGA divisions.

There are also disc golf companies such as Disc-Diva, that have started up with a primary, though not exclusive, focus on women in the sport, promoting accessories geared towards women and using catch phrases like "you wish you threw like a girl". Sassy Pants is another group that focuses on getting more involvement from women in the sport, advocating for sponsorship of women to enter tournaments.

Women's disc golf teams are involved in the National Collegiate Disc Golf Championship, and the Mississippi State Women's Team were the inaugural champions.

== The Disc Golf Hall of Fame ==
Inductees:

Year	Disc Golf Hall of Fame Inductees				
1993	Vanessa Chambers	Dave Dunipace	Ed Headrick	Tom Monroe	
1993	Jim Palmeri	Dan Roddick	Ted Smethers		
1994	Harold Duvall	Nobuya Kobayashi	Darrell Lynn	Dan Mangone	
1994	Doug Newland	Snapper Pierson	Lavone Wolfe		
1995	Ken Climo	John David	David Greenwell	Johnny Roberts	
1995	Rick Voakes				
1996	Mike Conger	Patti Kunkle	Rick Rothstein		
1997	Steve Slasor	Elaine King	Jim Kenner		
1998	Gregg Hosfeld	John Houck	Carlton Howard		
1999	Sam Ferrans	Steve Wisecup	Tim Selinske		
2000	Tom Schot	Royce Racinowski			
2001	Stan McDaniel	Johnny Sias			
2002	Alan Beaver	Gary Lewis			
2003	Mark Horn	Brian Hoeniger	Stancil Johnson		
2004	Derek Robins	Geoff Lissaman	Johnny Lissaman	Marty Hapner	
2005	Mats Bengtsson	Sylvia Voakes			
2006	Chuck Kennedy	Kozo Shimbo			
2007	Fred Salaz	Michael Travers			
2008	Dan Ginnelly	Juliana Korver			
2009	Crazy John Brooks	Lynne Warren	Michael Sullivan		
2010	Charlie Callahan	Tomas Ekstrom	Brian Cummings		
2011	Don Hoffman	Joe Feidt	Brent Hambrick		
2012	Tim Willis	Jeff Homburg	Bob Gentil (New Zealand)		
2013	Barry Schultz	Becky Zallek	Jim Challas	Ken Westerfield	
2014	Don Wilchek	Jim Oates	Victor Parra (Italy)		
2015	Gail McColl	Anni Kreml	J Gary Dropcho		
2016	Joseph Mela	Ace Mason	Tita Ugalde		
2017	John Bird	Des Reading	Brian Graham		
2018	Andi Young	Jay Reading	George Sappenfield		
2019	Eric Marx	Mitch McClellan			
2020	Jesper Lundmark	Cliff Towne	Al "Speedy" Guerrero	Bob Harris	Valarie Jenkins-Doss
2021	Dean Tannock	Glen Whitlock	Jonas Löf	Martin Fredericksen	Dave McCormack
2022	Pete May	Jim Orum	Peter Shive	Steve Lambert	Jo Cahow
2023	Charlie Mead	Steve Ganz	Kent Johnson	Dr. John G. Duesler, Jr.	Bill Burns
2024	Terry Calhoun	Mike 'Hugbee' Higgins	Leonard Muise	Chris O'Cleary	Scott Stokely
2025	Dan Doyle	Avery Jenkins	Sharon Jenkins	Jussi Meresmaa	Brian Schweberger

== Disc golf associations ==
Est.	Name	Abbr.	Location	Region	Reach
1976	Professional Disc Golf Association	PDGA	Appling, Georgia	United States	International
1977	French Flying Disc Federation (French: Fédération Française de Flying Disc; Fédération Flying Disc France)	FFFD and FFDF	Poissy	France	National
1986	Swiss Disc Golf Association (Swiss Standard German: Schweizer Disc Golf Verband; French: Association suisse de disc golf)	(Swiss Standard German: SDGV; French: ASDG)	Reichenbach im Kandertal, Bern	Switzerland	National
1997	Maui Disc Golf Association	MDGA	Lahaina, Hawaii	Hawaii	State
1998	Finnish Disc Golf Association (Finnish: Suomen frisbeegolfliitto)	FDGA (Finnish: SFL)		Finland	National
2011	Czech Disc Golf Association (Czech: Česká asociace discgolfu)	(Czech: ČADG)	Prague	Czechia	National
2011	Israel Disc Golf Association (Hebrew: עמותת ספורט דיסק גולף ישראל)	IDGA	Karmiel	Israel	National
2013	Regina Disc Golf Association	RDGA	Regina, Saskatchewan	Regina, Saskatchewan	City
2014	Estonian Disc Golf Association (Estonian: Eesti Discgolfi Liit)	EDGA (Estonian: EDGL)	Pärnu	Estonia	National
2016	Swedish Disc Golf Association (Swedish: Svenska Discgolfförbundet)	(Swedish: SDGF)	Gothenburg	Sweden	National
2021	Lithuanian Disc Golf Federation (Lithuanian: Lietuvos diskgolfo federacija)	(Lithuanian: LDGF)	Semeliškės	Lithuania	National

== See also ==
- Flying disc sports
- Glossary of disc golf terms
- List of disc golf players
- List of disc golf brands and manufacturers
