= Basket (disc golf) =

Target used in disc golf

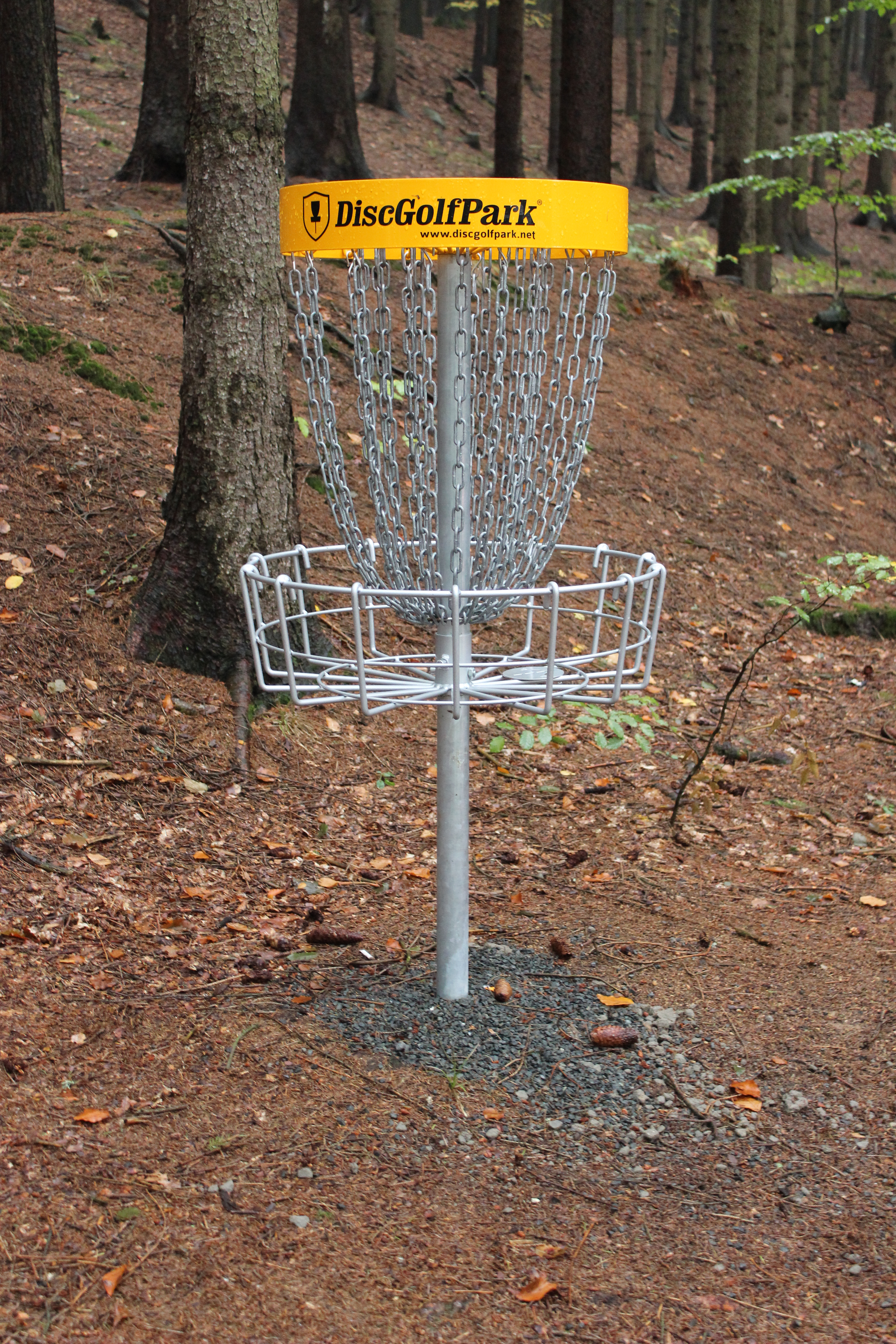
Permanent DiscGolfPark basket at a disc golf course in Czechia

A basket, sometimes also called pole hole, flying disc entrapment device or disc golf net, is by far the most common type of target used in disc golf. It features a disc-catching basket under a deflection assembly generally made out of chain. Permanent baskets on courses are built on an anchored metal pole, but portable disc golf baskets with foldable mechanisms to facilitate transportation also exist.

== History ==
Disc Golf Association's Mach 1 Disc Pole Hole disc golf basket was invented by Ed Headrick. It was the first formal disc golf target to incorporate chains and a basket on a pole, and became the Technical Standards used by the PDGA. Before the advent of the standardized basket, early competing designs existed, including cone baskets and tone poles.

== Specifications ==
The highest governing body in disc golf, the Professional Disc Golf Association (PDGA), classifies baskets into three categories, based upon hierarchical criteria: championship, standard, and basic. These levels of disc golf baskets differ in several ways, including design, size, and color.

The PDGA defines baskets as:

Basket Targets are constructed with a basket and typically have a deflection assembly above it. Object Targets, like a simple marked post, have an identified target zone but no basket.

== Permanent baskets ==
Most disc golf courses feature permanent baskets, which are bolted to an anchor embedded in the ground with a concrete base. They are secured using a padlock, and can be pulled out for maintenance.

== Non-commercially available baskets ==
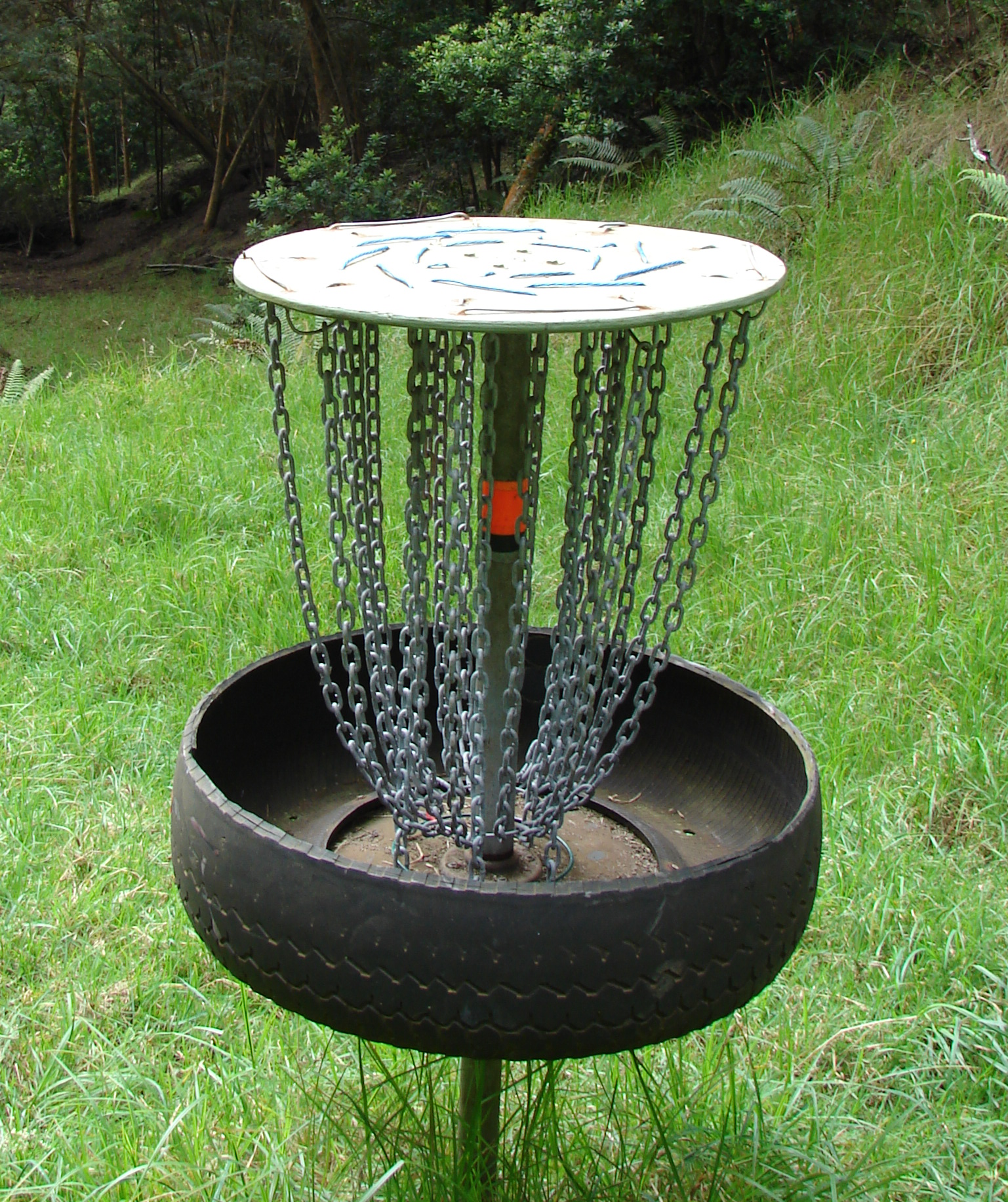
Homemade basket in Hawaii made with a repurposed tire

Artisanal, custom, DIY, homemade, improvised, jury-rigged, upcycled, or otherwise non-commercially available baskets are not uncommon in disc golf. They are most often designed and built by private individuals who use them for backyard putting practice. They can also be found on pirate courses, on community courses in areas with limited funding, and on certain military bases.

The PDGA deems DIY baskets acceptable for the lowest tier competitions, but recommends submitting a sample basket to the PDGA Technical Standards Working Group (TSWG) for proper target certification.

DIY baskets can be made from scratch using of wood or metal, or they can be built by combining existing parts, such as tires and chains.

== See also ==
- List of disc golf brands and manufacturers
