= Disc Golf Pro Tour =

Professional disc golf competition series

- Disc Golf Pro Tour Logo
- Sport: Disc Golf
- Founded: 2016
- Founder: Steve Dodge and Nate Heinold
- First season: 2016 Disc Golf Pro Tour
- Director: Jeff Spring
- Country: United States, Norway, Denmark, Finland, Sweden, Estonia
- Most titles: MPO: (United States) Ricky Wysocki (28); FPO: (United States) Paige Pierce (37)
- Broadcasters: Disc Golf Network, ESPN
- Website: https://www.dgpt.com

The Disc Golf Pro Tour was founded in 2016 by Steve Dodge and Nate Heinold. The DGPT is the highest level of competition in professional disc golf. The tour currently operates two tours, the Elite Series and the Q-Series (formerly the Silver Series), both featuring men's and women's professional divisions. Through points earned by finishing at DGPT tournaments, competitors can earn berths in the final season event, the Tour Championship.

== Media coverage ==
Since 2020 live coverage of both MPO and FPO Elite Series divisions have been broadcast through the Disc Golf Network, a subscription-based streaming channel. Additionally, post-produced condensed coverage is available on YouTube through JomezPro, GK Pro, Gatekeeper Media, and other channels.

In November 2020 ESPN2 broadcast a tape-delayed package covering the final round of the 2020 Tour Championship produced by Jomez Productions.

== Major Winners ==
Event	Division	2022	2023	2024	2025	2026
PDGA World Championships	MPO	(United States) Paul McBeth	(United States) Isaac Robinson	(United States) Isaac Robinson	(United States) Gannon Buhr	(United States) Silas Schultz
PDGA World Championships	FPO	(Estonia) Kristin Lätt	(Estonia) Kristin Lätt	(Finland) Eveliina Salonen	(United States) Ohn Scoggins	(Finland) Eveliina Salonen
PDGA Champions Cup	MPO	(United States) Chris Dickerson	(United States) Isaac Robinson	(United States) Andrew Presnell	(United States) Isaac Robinson	(Finland) Niklas Anttila
PDGA Champions Cup	FPO	(United States) Paige Pierce	(Estonia) Kristin Lätt	(Finland) Eveliina Salonen	(United States) Missy Gannon	(Finland) Silva Saarinen
United States Disc Golf Championship	MPO	(United States) Gannon Buhr	(United States) Kyle Klein	(United States) Gannon Buhr	(United States) Anthony Barela	(United States) Calvin Heimburg
United States Women's Disc Golf Championships	FPO	(United States) Hailey King	(Estonia) Kristin Lätt	(United States) Missy Gannon	(Finland) Eveliina Salonen	(Finland) Silva Saarinen
European Open	MPO	(United States) Eagle McMahon	(United States) Corey Ellis	(United States) Gannon Buhr	(United States) Calvin Heimburg	(United States) Gannon Buhr
European Open	FPO	(United States) Paige Pierce	(Estonia) Kristin Lätt	(Estonia) Kristin Lätt	(Finland) Silva Saarinen	(Finland) Eveliina Salonen

== DGPT Tour Championship winners ==
Season	Location	MPO Winner	FPO Winner
2016	Jeffersonville, VT	(United States) Paul McBeth	(United States) Catrina Allen
2017	Jacksonville, FL	(United States) Ricky Wysocki	(United States) Paige Pierce
2018	Jacksonville, FL	(United States) Chris Dickerson	(United States) Sarah Hokom
2019	Charlotte, NC	(United States) Chris Dickerson	(United States) Catrina Allen
2020	Charlotte, NC	(United States) Kevin Jones	(United States) Hailey King
2021	Charlotte, NC	(United States) Nathan Queen	(United States) Missy Gannon
2022	Charlotte, NC	(United States) Ricky Wysocki	(Estonia) Kristin Tattar
2023	Charlotte, NC	(United States) Ricky Wysocki	(United States) Missy Gannon
2024	Charlotte, NC	(United States) Gannon Buhr	(United States) Missy Gannon
2025	Lynchburg, VA	(United States) Calvin Heimburg	(United States) Holyn Handley
2026	Lynchburg, VA	(United States) Gannon Buhr	(Finland) Silva Saarinen

== DGPT World Standings Champions ==
Season	MPO Winner	FPO Winner
2016	(United States) Ricky Wysocki	(United States) Sarah Hokom
2017	(United States) Ricky Wysocki	(United States) Paige Pierce
2018	(United States) Paul McBeth	(United States) Sarah Hokom
2019	(United States) Paul McBeth	(United States) Paige Pierce
2020	(United States) Paul McBeth	(United States) Paige Pierce
2021	(United States) Ricky Wysocki	(United States) Paige Pierce
2022	(United States) Ricky Wysocki	(Estonia) Kristin Tattar
2023	(United States) Calvin Heimburg	(Estonia) Kristin Tattar
2024	(United States) Gannon Buhr	(United States) Missy Gannon
2025	(United States) Gannon Buhr	(United States) Holyn Handley
2026	(United States) Gannon Buhr	(United States) Ohn Scoggins

== Seasons ==
=== 2016 Tour ===
Dates	Tournament	Location	MPO Winner	FPO Winner
Jun 23-26	The Vibram Open	Leicester, MA	(United States) Bradley Williams	(United States) Paige Pierce
Jul 8-10	Silver Cup XVI	Manitowoc, WI	(United States) Ricky Wysocki	(United States) Sarah Hokom
Jul 29-31	Minnesota Majestic	East Bethel, MN	(United States) Ricky Wysocki	(United States) Sarah Hokom
Aug 18-21	Ledgestone Open	Peoria, IL	(United States) Paul McBeth	(United States) Catrina Allen
Sep 15-17	Green Mountain Championship	Jeffersonville, VT	(United States) Ricky Wysocki	(United States) Catrina Allen
Sep 17-18	DGPT Championship	Jeffersonville, VT	(United States) Paul McBeth	(United States) Catrina Allen

=== 2017 Tour ===
Dates	Tournament	Location	MPO Winner	FPO Winner
Mar 1-4	The Memorial	Scottsdale, AZ	(United States) Paul McBeth	(United States) Paige Pierce
Mar 17-19	Waco Charity Open	Waco, TX	(United States) Jeremy Koling	(United States) Paige Pierce
Mar 31-Apr 2	Nick Hyde Memorial	Rockwall, TX	(United States) Paul McBeth	(United States) Catrina Allen
Apr 14-16	Jonesboro Open	Jonesboro, AR	(United States) Ricky Wysocki	(United States) Paige Pierce
Jun 2-4	Utah Open	Salt Lake City, UT	(United States) Ricky Wysocki	(United States) Jessica Weese
Aug 3-6	Ledgestone Open	Peoria, IL	(United States) Josh Anthon	(United States) Valarie Jenkins
Aug 17-20	Idlewild Open	Burlington, KY	(United States) James Conrad	(United States) Paige Pierce
Aug 31-Sep 3	Vibram Open	Leicester, MA	(United States) Ricky Wysocki	(United States) Paige Pierce
Sep 14-17	Green Mountain Championship	Jeffersonville, VT	(United States) Nate Doss	(United States) Paige Pierce
Oct 19-22	DGPT Championship	Jacksonville, FL	(United States) Ricky Wysocki	(United States) Paige Pierce

=== 2018 Tour ===
Dates	Tournament	Location	MPO Winner	FPO Winner
Feb 28-Mar 3	The Memorial Championship	Scottsdale, AZ	(Germany) Simon Lizotte	(United States) Paige Pierce
Mar 16-18	Waco Annual Charity Open	Waco, TX	(United States) Jeremy Koling	(United States) Paige Pierce
Apr 6-8	Jonesboro Open	Jonesboro, AR	(United States) Ricky Wysocki	(United States) Paige Pierce
May 25-27	San Francisco Open	San Francisco, CA	(United States) Paul McBeth	(United States) Sarah Hokom
Jun 22-24	Utah Open	Ogden, UT	(United States) Ricky Wysocki	(United States) Catrina Allen
Jul 6-8	Discraft Great Lakes Open	Milford, MI	(United States) Paul McBeth	(United States) Sarah Hokom
Jul 20-22	Idlewild Open	Burlington, KY	(United States) Paul McBeth	(United States) Paige Pierce
Aug 9-12	Ledgestone Open	Peoria, IL	(United States) Nate Sexton	(United States) Jessica Weese
Aug 24-26	Vibram Open	Leicester, MA	(United States) James Conrad	(United States) Sarah Hokom
Oct 18-20	DGPT Championship	Jacksonville, FL	(United States) Chris Dickerson	(United States) Sarah Hokom

=== 2019 Tour ===
Dates	Tournament	Location	MPO Winner	FPO Winner
Feb 28-Mar 3	The Memorial Championship	Scottsdale, AZ	(United States) Eagle McMahon	(Finland) Eveliina Salonen
Mar 14-16	Waco Annual Charity Open	Waco, TX	(United States) Paul McBeth	(United States) Catrina Allen
Apr 12-14	Jonesboro Open	Jonesboro, AR	(United States) Paul McBeth	(United States) Paige Pierce
May 10-12	San Francisco Open	San Francisco, CA	(United States) Ricky Wysocki	(United States) Catrina Allen
May 25-27	The Portland Open	Portland, OR	(United States) Drew Gibson	(United States) Paige Pierce
Jun 21-23	Ledgestone Open	Eureka, IL	(United States) Paul McBeth	(United States) Paige Pierce
July 5-7	Discraft Great Lakes Open	Milford, MI	(United States) Paul McBeth	(United States) Paige Pierce
Jul 26-28	Idlewild Open	Burlington, KY	(United States) Kevin Jones	(United States) Paige Pierce
Aug 29-Sep 1	MVP Open at Maple Hill	Leicester, MA	(United States) Paul McBeth	(United States) Paige Pierce
Sep 12-15	Green Mountain Championship	Jeffersonville, VT	(United States) Paul McBeth	(United States) Sarah Hokom
Oct 17-20	DGPT Championship	Charlotte, NC	(United States) Chris Dickerson	(United States) Catrina Allen

=== 2020 Tour ===
Elite
Dates	Tournament	Location	MPO Winner	FPO Winner
Feb 26 - Mar 3	The Memorial Championship	Scottsdale, AZ	(United States) Calvin Heimburg	(United States) Paige Pierce
Mar 12-14	Waco Annual Charity Open	Waco, TX	(United States) Colton Montgomery	(Finland) Eveliina Salonen
May 29-31	San Francisco Open	San Francisco, CA	Cancelled due to COVID-19	
Jun 26-28	Dynamic Discs Open	Emporia, KS	(United States) Paul McBeth	(United States) Paige Pierce
Jul 3-5	The Preserve Championship	Clearwater, MN	(United States) Nikko Locastro	(United States) Paige Pierce
Jul 3-5	The Portland Open	Fairview, OR	Cancelled due to COVID-19	
Jul 24-26	Discraft Great Lakes Open	Milford, MI	(United States) Eagle McMahon	(United States) Paige Pierce
Aug 7-9	Idlewild Open	Burlington, KY	(United States) Eagle McMahon	(United States) Ellen Widboom
Aug 13-16	Ledgestone Open	Eureka, IL	(United States) Ricky Wysocki	(United States) Catrina Allen
Sep 3-6	Green Mountain Championship	Jeffersonville, VT	(United States) Kevin Jones	(United States) Paige Pierce
Sep 11-13	MVP Open at Maple Hill	Leicester, MA	(United States) Paul McBeth	(United States) Paige Pierce
Oct 1-3	Jonesboro Open	Jonesboro, AR	(United States) Calvin Heimburg	(United States) Paige Pierce
Oct 15-18	DGPT Championship	Charlotte, NC	(United States) Kevin Jones	(United States) Hailey King

Silver
Dates	Tournament	Location	MPO Winner	FPO Winner
Jun 18-20	The Challenge at Goat Hill	Oceanside, CA	(United States) Anthony Barela	(United States) Ohn Scoggins
Jul 10-12	Silver Cup XX	Manitowoc, WI	(United States) Ricky Wysocki	(United States) Lisa Fajkus
Jul 31 - Aug 2	Mid America Open	Columbia, MO	(United States) Kevin Jones	(United States) Lisa Fajkus
Aug 21-23	Charlie Vettiner Open	Louisville, KY	Cancelled due to COVID-19	
Sep 11-13	Canadian National Championships	Bonshaw, PEI	Cancelled due to COVID-19	
Sep 18-20	Maine State Championship	New Gloucester, ME	(United States) Garrett Gurthie	(United States) Sarah Hokom
Oct 30 - Nov 1	The Open at Tallahassee	Tallahassee, FL	Cancelled due to COVID-19	

=== 2021 Tour ===
Elite
Dates	Tournament	Location	MPO Winner	FPO Winner
Feb 25-28	Las Vegas Challenge	Las Vegas, NV	(United States) Eagle McMahon	(United States) Paige Pierce
Mar 12-14	Waco Annual Charity Open	Waco, TX	(United States) Nikko Locastro	(United States) Kona Panis
Apr 16-18	Jonesboro Open	Jonesboro, AR	(United States) Ricky Wysocki	(United States) Catrina Allen
May 14-16	OTB Open	Stockton, CA	(United States) Eagle McMahon	(United States) Paige Pierce
Jun 4-6	The Portland Open	Portland, OR	(United States) Eagle McMahon	(United States) Paige Pierce
Jul 9-11	Des Moines Challenge	Des Moines, IA	(United States) Paul McBeth	(United States) Missy Gannon
Jul 23-25	Discraft Great Lakes Open	Milford, MI	(United States) Eagle McMahon	(Estonia) Kristin Tattar
Jul 30-Aug 1	The Preserve Championship	Clearwater, MN	(United States) Ricky Wysocki	(Estonia) Kristin Tattar
Aug 5-8	Ledgestone Open	Eureka, IL	(United States) Ricky Wysocki (United States) Calvin Heimburg	(United States) Paige Pierce
Aug 13-15	Idlewild Open	Burlington, KY	(United States) Kyle Klein	(United States) Paige Pierce
Sep 3-5	MVP Open at Maple Hill	Leicester, MA	(United States) Adam Hammes	(United States) Catrina Allen
Sep 9-12	Green Mountain Championship	Jeffersonville, VT	(United States) Chris Dickerson	(United States) Hailey King
Oct 15-18	DGPT Championship	Charlotte, NC	(United States) Nathan Queen	(United States) Missy Gannon

Silver
Dates	Tournament	Location	MPO Winner	FPO Winner
Mar 19-21	The Open at Belton	Belton, TX	(United States) Ricky Wysocki	(United States) Catrina Allen
Apr 8-10	Vintage Open	Russellville, AR	(United States) Calvin Heimburg	(United States) Sarah Hokom
Apr 23-25	Mid America Open	Columbia, MO	(United States) Kyle Klein	(United States) Heather Young
May 7-9	The Challenge at Goat Hill	Oceanside, CA	(United States) Ricky Wysocki	(United States) Lisa Fajkus
Jun 11-13	Resistance Discs Open	Ranier, OR	(United States) Adam Hammes	(United States) Deann Carey
Jul 2-4	Clash at the Canyons	Lockport, IL	(United States) Dan Schlitter	(Estonia) Kristin Tattar
Aug 20-22	Stafford Open	Voorhees, NJ	(United States) Matthew Orum	(United States) Missy Gannon

=== 2022 Tour ===
Elite
Dates	Tournament	Location	MPO Winner	FPO Winner
Feb 24-27	Las Vegas Challenge	Las Vegas, NV	(United States) Drew Gibson	(United States) Catrina Allen
Mar 11-13	Waco Annual Charity Open	Waco, TX	(United States) Paul McBeth	(United States) Valerie Mandujano
Mar 25-27	Texas State Disc Golf Championships	Tyler, TX	(United States) Ricky Wysocki	(United States) Paige Pierce
Apr 22-24	Jonesboro Open	Jonesboro, AR	(United States) Calvin Heimburg	(Estonia) Kristin Tattar
Apr 28-May 1	Dynamic Discs Open	Emporia, KS	(United States) Ricky Wysocki	(Estonia) Kristin Tattar
May 20-22	OTB Open	Stockton, CA	(Germany) Simon Lizotte	(United States) Paige Pierce
Jun 2-5	Portland Open	Portland, OR	(Germany) Simon Lizotte	(United States) Valerie Mandujano
Jun 16-19	DGPT Match Play Championship	Bailey, CO	(United States) Joel Freeman	(United States) Ohn Scoggins
Jun 24-26	The Preserve Championship	Clearwater, MN	(United States) Bradley Williams	(United States) Paige Pierce
Jul 8-10	Open at Idlewild	Burlington, KY	(United States) Isaac Robinson	(United States) Catrina Allen
Jul 29-31	Discraft Great Lakes Open	Milford, MI	(United States) Calvin Heimburg	(United States) Natalie Ryan
Aug 11-14	Ledgestone Open	Eureka, IL	(United States) Ricky Wysocki	(United States) Missy Gannon
Aug 19-21	Des Moines Challenge	Des Moines, IA	(Germany) Simon Lizotte	(Estonia) Kristin Tattar
Sep 15-18	Green Mountain Championship	Jeffersonville, VT	(United States) Ricky Wysocki	(Estonia) Kristin Tattar
Sep 22-25	MVP Open at Maple Hill	Leicester, MA	(Germany) Simon Lizotte	(United States) Natalie Ryan
Oct 13-16	DGPT Championship	Charlotte, NC	(United States) Ricky Wysocki	(Estonia) Kristin Tattar

Silver
Dates	Tournament	Location	MPO Winner	FPO Winner
Mar 18-20	The Open at Belton	Belton, TX	(United States) Chris Dickerson	(United States) Catrina Allen
Apr 1-3	Music City Open	Nashville, TN	(United States) Chris Dickerson	(United States) Missy Gannon
Apr 8-10	Open at Tallahassee	Tallahassee, FL	(Estonia) Albert Tamm	(United States) Stacie Hass
May 13-15	Santa Cruz Masters Cup	Santa Cruz, CA	(United States) Gannon Buhr	(United States) Sarah Hokom
Jun 10-12	Beaver State Fling	Estacada, OR	(United States) Garrett Gurthie	(United States) Valerie Mandujano
Jul 13-16	PCS Sula Open	Langevåg/Vestnes, Norway	(United States) Gregg Barsby	(Norway) Anniken Steen
Aug 5-7	Mid-America Open	Columbia, MO	(United States) Alden Harris	(United States) Sarah Hokom
Sep 9-11	Butler County Disc Golf Classic	Pittsburgh, PA	(United States) Joel Freeman	(Estonia) Kristin Tattar

=== 2023 Tour ===
Elite
Dates	Tournament	Location	MPO Winner	FPO Winner
Feb 23-26	Las Vegas Challenge	Las Vegas, NV	(United States) Calvin Heimburg	(United States) Catrina Allen
Mar 10-12	Waco Annual Charity Open	Waco, TX	(United States) Kyle Klein	(Estonia) Kristin Tattar
Mar 17-19	The Open at Austin	Austin, TX	(United States) Gannon Buhr	(United States) Paige Pierce
Apr 7-9	Music City Open	Nashville, TN	(Germany) Simon Lizotte	(Estonia) Kristin Tattar
Apr 28-30	Jonesboro Open	Jonesboro, AR	(United States) Calvin Heimburg	(United States) Kat Mertsch
May 12-14	OTB Open	Stockton, CA	(United States) Emerson Keith	(United States) Paige Pierce
Jun 1-4	Portland Open	Portland, OR	(United States) Adam Hammes	(Estonia) Kristin Tattar
Jun 16-18	Dynamic Discs Open	Emporia, KS	(United States) Parker Welck	(United States) Hailey King
Jun 23-25	Des Moines Challenge	Indianola, IA	(United States) Gannon Buhr	(Estonia) Kristin Tattar
Jun 30-Jul 2	The Preserve Championship	Clearwater, MN	(United States) Ricky Wysocki	(United States) Catrina Allen
Jul 13-15	PCS Sula Open	Vestnes, Norway	(United States) Paul McBeth	(Estonia) Kristin Tattar
Aug 3-6	Ledgestone Open	Eureka, Il	(United States) Cole Redalen	(United States) Missy Gannon
Aug 11-13	Idlewild Open	Burlington, KY	(United States) Gannon Buhr	(United States) Valerie Mandujano
Aug 17-20	Discraft Great Lakes Open	Milford, MI	(Germany) Simon Lizotte	(United States) Ohn Scoggins
Sep 14-17	MVP Open at Maple Hill	Leicester, MA	(United States) Matthew Orum	(United States) Hailey King
Oct 12-15	DGPT Championship	Charlotte, NC	(United States) Ricky Wysocki	(United States) Missy Gannon

Silver
Dates	Tournament	Location	MPO Winner	FPO Winner
Oct 28-30	Lake Marshall Open	Montross, VA	(United States) Luke Samson	(United States) Macie Velediaz
Nov 11-13	New World Championship	Jacksonville, FL	(United States) Paul McBeth	(United States) Maria Oliva
Mar 24-26	Texas State Championships	Houston, TX	(United States) Calvin Heimburg	(United States) Sai Ananda
Apr 14-16	Blue Ridge Championship	Marion, NC	(United States) Gannon Buhr	(Estonia) Kristin Tattar
May 19-21	Beaver State Fling	Estacada, OR	(United States) Eagle McMahon	(United States) Jennifer Allen
Aug 25-27	Rochester Flying Disc Open	Rochester, NY	(United States) Ezra Robinson	(Canada) Chantel Budinsky
Sep 8-10	Discmania Open	Prince Edward Island, Canada	(United States) Eagle McMahon	(United States) Ella Hansen

=== 2024 Tour ===
Dates	Tournament	Location	MPO Winner	FPO Winner
Feb 23-25	Chess.com Invitational	Brooksville, FL	(United States) Anthony Barela	(Finland) Eveliina Salonen
Mar 7-10	Waco Annual Charity Open	Waco, TX	(United States) Gannon Buhr	(Estonia) Kristin Tattar
Mar 15-17	The Open at Austin	Austin, TX	(Finland) Niklas Anttila	(United States) Ohn Scoggins
Mar 29-31	Texas State Disc Golf Championship	Houston, TX	(United States) Anthony Barela	(Norway) Anniken Kristiansen Steen
Apr 12-14	Jonesboro Open	Jonesboro, AR	(United States) Anthony Barela	(Estonia) Kristin Tattar
Apr 19-21	Music City Open	Nashville, TN	(Germany) Simon Lizotte	(Estonia) Kristin Tattar
May 3-5	Dynamic Discs Open	Emporia, KS	(United States) Calvin Heimburg	(United States) Missy Gannon
May 10-12	Copenhagen Open	Copenhagen, Denmark	(Finland) Jesse Nieminen	(Finland) Eveliina Salonen
May 17-19	OTB Open	Stockton, CA	(United States) Calvin Heimburg	(United States) Ella Hansen
May 30-Jun 2	Portland Open	Portland, OR	(United States) Gannon Buhr	(United States) Paige Pierce
Jun 7-9	Beaver State Fling	Estacada, OR	(United States) Gannon Buhr	(United States) Holyn Handley
Jun 14-16	Turku Open	Turku, Finland	(Finland) Niklas Anttila	(Finland) Silva Saarinen
Jun 21-23	Preserve Championship	Clearwater, MN	(United States) Ricky Wysocki	(United States) Missy Gannon
Jun 28-30	Swedish Open	Borås, Sweden	(United States) James Proctor	(Finland) Silva Saarinen
Jul 5-7	Des Moines Challenge	Des Moines, IA	(United States) Anthony Barela	(United States) Emily Weatherman
Jul 12-14	Krokhol Open	Oslo, Norway	(United States) Ricky Wysocki	(Estonia) Kristin Tattar
Jul 26-28	European Disc Golf Festival	Tallinn, Estonia	(United States) Ricky Wysocki	(United States) Missy Gannon
Aug 1-4	Ledgestone Open	Peoria, IL	(United States) Gannon Buhr	(United States) Holyn Handley
Aug 9-11	Idlewild	Burlington, KY	(United States) Joseph Anderson	(United States) Ohn Scoggins
Sept 5-8	Discraft Great Lakes Open	Milford, MI	(United States) Gannon Buhr	(United States) Holyn Handley
Sept 19-22	Green Mountain Championship	Jeffersonville, VT	(United States) Gannon Buhr	(Estonia) Kristin Tattar
Sept 26-29	MVP Open	Leicester, MA	(United States) James Proctor	(United States) Missy Gannon
Oct 17-20	DGPT Championship	Charlotte, NC	(United States) Gannon Buhr	(United States) Missy Gannon

=== 2025 Tour ===
Dates	Tournament	Location	MPO Winner	FPO Winner
Feb 28-Mar 2	Supreme Flight Open	Brooksville, FL	(United States) Ezra Robinson	(United States) Ella Hansen
Mar 14-16	Waco Annual Charity Open	Waco, TX	(United States) Adam Hammes	(Estonia) Kristin Lätt
Mar 20-23	The Open at Austin	Austin, TX	(Finland) Niklas Anttila	(United States) Holyn Handley
Apr 4-6	Music City Open	Nashville, TN	(Finland) Niklas Anttila	(Estonia) Kristin Lätt
Apr 18-20	Kansas City Wide Open	Liberty, MO	(United States) Gannon Buhr	(United States) Holyn Handley
May 16-18	Cascade Challenge	Shelton, WA	(United States) Anthony Barela	(United States) Missy Gannon
May 23-25	Konopiste Open	Prague, Czechia	(Estonia) Mauri Villmann	(Estonia) Kristin Lätt
May 29-Jun 1	Northwest Disc Golf Championship	Portland, OR	(United States) Gannon Buhr	(United States) Holyn Handley
Jun 6-8	Ale Open	Nol, Sweden	(Finland) Niklas Anttila	(Finland) Silva Saarinen
Jun 13-15	The Preserve Championship	Clearwater, MN	(United States) Gannon Buhr	(Finland) Silva Saarinen
Jun 27-29	Discmania Challenge	Indianola, IA	(United States) Ezra Aderhold	(United States) Cadence Burge
Jul 4-6	PCS Open	Overaas, Norway	(United States) Adam Hammes	(Finland) Eveliina Salonen
Jul 11-13	Krokhol Open	Oslo, Norway	(United States) Benjamin Callaway	(United States) Holyn Handley
Aug 8-10	Turku Open	Turku, Finland	(United States) Ezra Robinson	(Finland) Silva Saarinen
Aug 14-17	Ledgestone Open	Peoria, IL	(United States) Gannon Buhr	(United States) Valerie Mandujano
Aug 22-24	LWS Open at Idlewild	Burlington, KY	(United States) Paul McBeth	(United States) Ohn Scoggins
Sept 4-7	Discraft Great Lakes Open	Milford, MI	(United States) Gannon Buhr	(United States) Missy Gannon
Sept 18-21	Green Mountain Championship	Jeffersonville, VT	(United States) Paul McBeth	(United States) Paige Pierce
Sept 25-28	MVP Open	Leicester, MA	(United States) Cole Redalen	(United States) Missy Gannon
Oct 16-19	DGPT Championship	Lynchburg, VA	(United States) Calvin Heimburg	(United States) Holyn Handley

=== 2026 Tour ===
Dates	Tournament	Location	MPO Winner	FPO Winner
Feb 27–Mar 1	Supreme Flight Open	Brooksville, FL	(United States) Ricky Wysocki	(United States) Ohn Scoggins
Mar 13–15	Big Easy Open	Jefferson Parish, LA	(United States) Gannon Buhr	(United States) Holyn Handley
Mar 27–29	Queen City Classic	Charlotte, NC	(United States) Gannon Buhr	(United States) Jessica Gurthie
Apr 17–19	Jonesboro Open	Jonesboro, AR	(United States) Gannon Buhr	(Finland) Henna Blomroos
Apr 24–26	Kansas City Wide Open	Liberty, MO	(United States) Cole Redalen	(Finland) Eveliina Salonen
May 7–10	The Open at Austin	Austin, TX	(United States) Paul Ulibarri	(United States) Ohn Scoggins
May 21–24	OTB Open	Stockton, CA	(United States) Calvin Heimburg	(United States) Holyn Handley
Jun 4–7	Northwest Championship	Portland, OR	(United States) Gannon Buhr	(Finland) Silva Saarinen
Jun 26–28	Swedish Open	Borås, Sweden	(United States) Eagle McMahon	(Finland) Silva Saarinen
Jul 3–5	Ale Open	Nol, Sweden	(United States) Ricky Wysocki	(Finland) Eveliina Salonen
Jul 10–12	Heinola Open	Heinola, Finland	(United States) Gannon Buhr	(Norway) Anniken Kristiansen Steen
Jul 30–Aug 2	Ledgestone Open	Peoria, IL	(United States) Luke Taylor	(Finland) Eveliina Salonen
Aug 7–9	Discmania Challenge	Indianola, IA	(United States) Evan Smith	(United States) Ella Hansen
Aug 14–16	Preserve Championship	Clearwater, MN	(United States) Adam Hammes (United States) Ricky Wysocki	(United States) Catrina Allen (Finland) Silva Saarinen
Sep 4–6	LWS Open at Idlewild	Burlington, KY	(United States) Gannon Buhr	(United States) Ohn Scoggins
Sep 17–20	Green Mountain Championship	Jeffersonville, VT	(United States) Raven Newsome	(United States) Ohn Scoggins
Sep 24–27	MVP Open x OTB	Leicester, MA	(United States) Ricky Wysocki	(Latvia) Sintija Klezberga
Oct 15–18	DGPT Championship	Lynchburg, VA		

== Players with multiple wins ==
As of 27 September 2026 after the MVP Open.

MPO
Rank	Player	Wins	First	Last
1	(United States) Ricky Wysocki	28	2016	2026
2	(United States) Gannon Buhr	21	2023	2026
3	(United States) Paul McBeth	20	2016	2025
4	(United States) Calvin Heimburg	11	2020	2026
5	(Germany) Simon Lizotte	8	2018	2024
5	(United States) Eagle McMahon	8	2019	2026
7	(United States) Anthony Barela	5	2024	2025
7	(Finland) Niklas Antilla	5	2024	2025
7	(United States) Adam Hammes	5	2021	2026
10	(United States) Kevin Jones	3	2019	2020
10	(United States) Chris Dickerson	3	2018	2021
10	(United States) Cole Redalen	3	2023	2026
13	(United States) Ezra Robinson	2	2025	2025
13	(United States) James Conrad	2	2017	2018
13	(United States) Nikko Locastro	2	2020	2021
13	(United States) Jeremy Koling	2	2017	2018
13	(United States) Kyle Klein	2	2021	2023
13	(United States) Drew Gibson	2	2019	2022
13	(United States) Bradley Williams	2	2016	2022
13	(United States) James Proctor	2	2024	2024

FPO
Rank	Player	Wins	First	Last
1	(United States) Paige Pierce	37	2016	2025
2	(Estonia) Kristin Lätt	20	2021	2025
3	(United States) Catrina Allen	16	2016	2026
4	(United States) Missy Gannon	13	2021	2025
5	(United States) Holyn Handley	11	2024	2026
6	(United States) Sarah Hokom	9	2016	2019
6	(United States) Ohn Scoggins	9	2022	2026
8	(Finland) Eveliina Salonen	8	2019	2026
8	(Finland) Silva Saarinen	8	2024	2026
10	(United States) Hailey King	4	2020	2023
10	(United States) Valerie Mandujano	4	2022	2025
12	(United States) Jessica Guthrie	3	2017	2026
12	(United States) Ella Hansen	3	2024	2026
14	(United States) Natalie Ryan	2	2022	2022

== Wins by nationality ==
As of 27 September 2026 after the MVP Open.

MPO
Rank	Player	Wins	First	Last
1	United States	140	2016	2026
2	Germany	8	2018	2024
3	Finland	6	2024	2025
4	Estonia	1	2025	2025

FPO
Rank	Player	Wins	First	Last
1	United States	114	2016	2026
2	Estonia	20	2021	2025
3	Finland	17	2019	2026
4	Norway	1	2024	2024
4	Latvia	1	2026	2026

== Notes ==
1. Due to severe weather, the tournament was ended early and co-champions were declared.
2. No European Open was held in 2025, and the European Disc Golf Festival was held as the European major instead.
3. Due to the short turnaround to the United States Women's Disc Golf Championships, the Heinola Open FPO Division only counted for DGPT Euro Tour purposes.
4. Doubles format.
