= 2024 in flying disc sports =

This article lists the flying disc sports events for 2024.

== Disc golf ==
=== Professional Disc Golf Association ===
==== Major events ====
- March 21–24: United States Women's Disc Golf Championships in Round Rock
- April 3–6: College Disc Golf National Championships in (United States) Rock Hill
- April 25–28: PDGA Champions Cup in (United States) Morton
- June 7–9: United States Amateur Disc Golf Championship in Milford
- June 11–15: Masters Disc Golf World Championships in (United States) Emporia
- July 16–20: Junior Disc Golf World Championships in (United States) Tulsa
- July 17–21: European Open in (Finland) Nokia
- August 6–10: Amateur Disc Golf World Championships in (United States) Grand Rapids
- August 21–25: Professional Disc Golf World Championships in (United States) Lynchburg
- September 19–22: Tim Selinske United States Masters Disc Golf Championships in Raleigh
- October 10–13: United States Disc Golf Championship in Rock Hill

==== Disc Golf Pro Tour Elite Series ====
- March 7–10: Waco Annual Charity Open in (United States) Waco
  - Winners: (United States) Gannon Buhr (MPO) / (Estonia) Kristin Tattar (FPO)
- March 15–17: The Open At Austin in (United States) Austin
  - Winners: (Finland) Niklas Anttila (MPO) / (United States) Ohn Scoggins (FPO)
- March 29–31: Texas State Disc Golf Championships in (United States) Houston
  - Winners: (United States) Anthony Barela (MPO) / (Norway) Anniken Kristiansen Steen (FPO)

=== DGPT Europe ===
Standard events

- May 10–12: Copenhagen Open in (Denmark) Copenhagen
- June 14–16: Turku Open in (Finland) Turku
- June 28–30: Swedish Open in (Sweden) Boras
- July 12–14: Krokhol Open in (Norway) Oslo
- July 26–28: European Disc Golf Festival in (Estonia) Tallinn

== Ultimate frisbee ==
=== 2024 Ultimate Frisbee Association Championship ===
- April 26 – August 24: 2024 UFA season
