= Flying disc at the World Games =

Flying disc was introduced as a World Games sport at the 2001 World Games in Akita, consisting of Disc golf and Ultimate. Disc golf was discontinued after the first year, but will be returning in 2025.

== Ultimate ==
From 2001 to 2017, the Ultimate tournament featured just six teams, the top five countries from the previous years World Ultimate Championships of all three divisions: men's, women's and mixed and the host country. In 2022 the tournament was expanded to eight teams.

From 2001 to 2009 the tournament was played with six players per side, with three women and three men on the field from each team. In 2013, the tournament was played with the regulatory seven players per side, three men four women or four women, three men.

Games	Gold	Silver	Bronze
2001 Akita	Canada (CAN)	United States (USA)	Japan (JPN)
2005 Duisburg	United States (USA)	Australia (AUS)	Canada (CAN)
2009 Kaohsiung	United States (USA)	Japan (JPN)	Australia (AUS)
2013 Cali	United States (USA)	Australia (AUS)	Canada (CAN)
2017 Wrocław	United States (USA)	Colombia (COL)	Canada (CAN)
2022 Birmingham	United States (USA)	Australia (AUS)	Colombia (COL)
2025 Chengdu	United States (USA)	Canada (CAN)	France (FRA)

=== Cumulative results ===
The following is a compiled national level championship table for ultimate at the World Games.

Team	Appearances	Winners	Runners-up	Third-place
United States	6	5 (2005, 2009, 2013, 2017, 2022)	1 (2001)	–
Canada	5	1 (2001)	–	3 (2005, 2013, 2017)
Australia	5	–	3 (2005, 2013,2022)	1 (2009)
Japan	4	–	1 (2009)	1 (2001)
Colombia	3	–	1 (2017)	1 (2022)
France	2	–	–	1 (2025)

a: Hosts

== Disc golf ==
=== Men's individual ===
Games	Gold	Silver	Bronze
2001 Akita	Barry Schultz (USA)	Michael Sullivan (CAN)	Jesper Lundmark (SWE)

=== Women's individual ===
Games	Gold	Silver	Bronze
2001 Akita	Juliana Korver (USA)	Niloofar Mosavar Rahmani (SWE)	Ruth Steele (GBR)

=== Mixed doubles ===
Games	Gold	Silver	Bronze
2025 Chengdu	United States: Gannon Buhr; Missy Gannon	Finland: Nestori Tuhkanen; Eveliina Salonen	Latvia: Rainers Balodis; Elizabete Peksena
