= Maple Hill Open =

Disc golf tournament

Maple Hill Open is an annual disc golf tournament held at the Maple Hill Disc Golf Course in Leicester, Massachusetts.

For six years, the event (formerly known as The Vibram Open), had the largest MPO and FPO payout of any stop on the PDGA National Tour. In its formative years, the event was known as the MSDGC and established itself as one of the touring pros' favorite stops on the pro tour. The course is consistently rated as among the top 10 in the world.

The event has been covered by ESPN, NPR, Chronicle, numerous regional outlets (Worcester Telegram, Blackstone Valley Press, WTAG, WAAF), and by many other disc golf media sources (PDGA, Ultiworld Disc Golf, Smashboxx.TV, Disc Golf Planet, Disc Golf Monthly, Disc Golf Live, thediscgolfguy).

The Maple Hill Open / Vibram Open / MSDGC has been an innovative disc golf event and has helped pioneer:

- Annual DVD reviews of disc golf tournaments
- Live scoring
- Live video broadcasts
- Live audio commentary
- The Spirit Award in disc golf
- "The 8-Holes" themed spectators on the 8th hole
- The pond jump for the winners

Year	Event	Men's Champion	Women's Champion	Big Dog Award	Results	Event notes
2004	MSDGC	Ron Russell	Des Reading	Bob Graham	Recap	Ron Russell beat Steve Brinster in a one-hole playoff.
2005	MSDGC	Kevin McCoy	Des Reading	Jay Reading	Recap	Kevin McCoy beat Walter Haney in a one-hole playoff.
2006	MSDGC	Chris Sprague	Des Reading	Lesli Demark	Recap	Chris Sprague held off 3X World Champion Barry Schultz to win by one.
2007	MSDGC	Cale Leiviska	Des Reading	The Frizzaks	Recap	Cale Leiviska beat Geoff Bennett in a three-hole playoff.
2008	Vibram Open	Avery Jenkins	Valarie Jenkins	"Big Dog" Sweeton	Recap	The Spirit Award was renamed the Big Dog Award.
2009	Vibram Open	Barry Schultz	Sarah Stanhope	Jeremy Koling	Recap	Schultz shot the first sub-50 round on the Maple Hill Golds.
2010	Vibram Open	Nikko Locastro	Sarah Stanhope	Jay Gobrecht	Recap	Locastro, Matt Orum and Dave Feldberg all had a chance to win on their final shots.
2011	Vibram Open	Nate Doss	Sarah Hokom	The Brittons	Recap	Sarah Hokom denied Sarah Stanhope's threepeat on the final hole.
2012	Vibram Open	Cale Leiviska	Catrina Allen	Dana Vicich	Recap	Cale Leiviska became the first 2X men's champion.
2013	Vibram Open	Paul McBeth	Valarie Jenkins	Mark Verrochi	Recap	McBeth shot a 45 on the Golds, perhaps the best round in PDGA history.
2014	Maple Hill Open	Jeremy Koling	Paige Pierce		Recap	Jeremy Koling the first Spirit Award winner to win the MHO.
2015	Maple Hill Open	Ricky Wysocki	Paige Pierce	Andrew Streeter	Recap	Pierce won her second straight MHO by 5 strokes
2016	Vibram Open	Bradley Williams	Paige Pierce		Recap	Williams beat Michael Johansen in playoff for his first NT victory
2017	Vibram Open	Ricky Wysocki	Paige Pierce		MPO Recap FPO Recap	Wysocki held off Eagle McMahon and Paul McBeth to win by two strokes. Pierce erased a six stroke deficit with a 1005-rated final round to beat Valarie Jenkins.
2018	MVP Open	James Conrad	Sarah Hokom		Recap	
2019	MVP Open	Paul McBeth	Paige Pierce		Recap	
2020	MVP Open	Paul McBeth	Paige Pierce		Recap	Pierce completed a run of six wins in seven years.
2021	MVP Open	Adam Hammes	Catrina Allen		Recap	
2022	MVP Open	Simon Lizotte	Natalie Ryan		Recap	Simon Lizotte won from the chase card. Natalie Ryan beat Kristin Lätt in a 1 hole playoff.
2023	MVP Open	Matthew Orum	Hailey King		Recap	Matty O. won his first pro tour event, from the chase card.
2024	MVP Open	James Proctor	Missy Gannon		Recap	Proctor made the winning putt on hole 18 from the drop zone
2025	MVP Open	Cole Redalen	Missy Gannon		Recap	Missy Gannon repeated as FPO champion
