= Flying disc at the 2022 World Games =

- Venue: John Carroll Catholic High School
- Dates: 12–16 July 2022
- No. of events: 1

The flying disc competition at the 2022 World Games took place in July 2022, in Birmingham, Alabama, USA, at John Carroll Catholic High School. Originally scheduled to take place in July 2021, the Games were rescheduled for July 2022 as a result of the 2020 Summer Olympics postponement due to the COVID-19 pandemic.

== Qualification ==
A total of 8 teams competed in the flying disc event at the 2022 World Games.

The 2016 World Ultimate and Guts Championships acted as the qualification tournament. Eight best teams qualified for the World Games.

=== Qualified teams ===
Team	Date of qualification	Method of qualification	Finals appearance	Previous appearance
United States	26 June 2016	Host	6th	2017
Australia	26 June 2016	Finished second at the 2016 WUGC	5th	2017
Canada	26 June 2016	Finished third at the 2016 WUGC	6th	2017
Japan	26 June 2016	Finished sixth at the 2016 WUGC	5th	2017
Colombia	26 June 2016	Finished eight at the 2016 WUGC	4th	2017
(United Kingdom) Great Britain	26 June 2016	Finished fifth at the 2016 WUGC	3rd	2013
France	26 June 2016	Finished fourth at the 2016 WUGC	1st	-
Germany	26 June 2016	Finished ninth at the 2016 WUGC	3rd	2005

== Medal table ==
* Host nation (United States)

Rank	Nation	Gold	Silver	Bronze	Total
1	United States*	1	0	0	1
2	Australia	0	1	0	1
3	Colombia	0	0	1	1
Totals (3 entries)		1	1	1	3

== Medalists ==
Event	Gold	Silver	Bronze
Mixed tournament	United States; Claire Chastain; Carolyn Finney; Dylan Freechild; Nate Goff; Kaela Helton; Chris Kocher; Grant Lindsley; Sarah Meckstroth; Jimmy Mickle; Carolyn Normile; Opi Payne; Khalif El Salaam; Claire Trop; Jack Williams	Australia; Rob Andrews; Liv Carr; Georgia Egan-Griffiths; Alex Gan; Alex Ladomatos; Caro Ma; Sam McGuckin; Kyal Oh; Cat Phillips; Mish Phillips; Alex Prentice; Alex Shepherd; Tom Tullett; Sally Yu	Colombia; Ivan Alba; Jonathan Cantor; Maria Manuela Cardenas; Maria Valeria Cardenas; Yina Cartagena; Julio Duque; Alexander Ford; Maria Angelica Forero; Jose Jimenez; Ximena Montana; Elizabeth Mosquera; Laura Ospina; Andres Ramirez; Simon Ramirez; Jose Manuel Rosero; Alejandra Torres
