= Carolyn Finney =

American frisbee player

Personal information
- Born: August 12, 1987 (age 38) San Jose, California
- Education: University of California, Santa Barbara (BS)
- Occupation: Hardware Engineer

Sport
- Sport: Ultimate
- College team: UCSB Burning Skirts (2007-2011)
- Club: Santa Barbara Lady Condors (2007-2009) San Diego Knock Out (2010) San Francisco Fury (2012-present)
Medal record
Women's ultimate frisbee
Representing United States
World Games
| Gold medal – first place | 2017 Wroclaw | Mixed |
| Gold medal – first place | 2022 Birmingham | Mixed |
| Gold medal – first place | 2025 Chengdu | Mixed |
World Ultimate and Guts Championships
| Gold medal – first place | 2016 London | Mixed |
| Silver medal – second place | 2012 Sakai | Women's |
USAU Club Championships
| Gold medal – first place | 2012 Sarasota | Women's |
| Gold medal – first place | 2017 Sarasota | Women's |
| Gold medal – first place | 2018 San Diego | Women's |
| Silver medal – second place | 2013 Frisco | Women's |
| Silver medal – second place | 2014 Frisco | Women's |
USAU College Championships
| Gold medal – first place | 2009 Columbus | Women's |
| Gold medal – first place | 2011 Boulder | Women's |
| Silver medal – second place | 2007 Columbus | Women's |
| Silver medal – second place | 2008 Boulder | Women's |
| Silver medal – second place | 2010 Madison | Women's |

Carolyn Finney, colloquially known as "Finney," is an ultimate player for San Francisco Fury and has represented the United States national team multiple times in international competition. She is known as one of the most well-rounded players in the USA Ultimate women's division.

== Personal life ==
Carolyn Finney was born in August 12, 1987, in San Jose, California. She was raised in San Jose aside from three years living in Germany as a young child. She went to college at the University of California, Santa Barbara where she began majoring in history, transitioned to aquatic biology and finally finished out with a B.S. in Mechanical Engineering. She commuted to San Francisco from Santa Barbara to play for San Francisco Fury for five seasons, starting in 2012, before moving to San Francisco to work as a hardware engineer in 2016.

== Ultimate career ==
Finney started playing ultimate at the University of California, Santa Barbara with the women's ultimate team, the Burning Skirts. She played with the team for five years (2007-2011). During these years, the Burning Skirts were a powerhouse of the college women's ultimate scene, playing in the championship final every year from 2007-2011 and winning gold in 2009 and 2011. Finney was UCSB's Callahan nominee in 2011 and was a finalist, finishing in the top 5.

From 2007-2009, Finney played for the Santa Barbara Lady Condors and in 2010 she played for San Diego Knock Out. She began playing for San Francisco Fury in 2012 and continues to play with them today. She won club championships with Fury in 2012, 2017, and 2018. In 2012, she won silver at the WFDF World Ultimate and Guts Championships with Fury. Fury, as the highest finishing US team at the 2011 USA Ultimate Club Championships, had earned the right to represent the United States as Team USA at this tournament.

In 2016, Finney won gold representing the United States at the WFDF World Ultimate and Guts Championships on the mixed national team. She also won gold with the United States National Team at the 2017 World Games in Wroclaw, Poland. She was rostered with the USA mixed national team that was scheduled to play at the 2020 WFDF World Ultimate and Guts Championships; however the tournament was canceled due to the COVID-19 pandemic. In 2022, she won another gold at the 2022 World Games in Birmingham, Alabama.

== Honors ==
- 2007, 2008, 2010 Silver - USAU College Championships
- 2009, 2011 Gold - USAU College Championships
- 2012 Silver - WFDF World Ultimate and Guts Championships
- 2016 Gold - WFDF World Ultimate and Guts Championships
- 2012, 2017, 2018 Gold - USAU Club Championships
- 2017 Gold - World Games
- 2018 Ultiworld Women’s Club Player Of The Year
- 2018 Ultiworld All-Club 2018: 1st Team (Women’s)
- 2019 Ultiworld Women’s Club Offensive Player Of The Year 1st Runner-Up
- 2019 Ultiworld All-Club 2019: 1st Team (Women’s)
- 2022 Gold - World Games
