= United States Women's Disc Golf Championships =

The United States Women's Disc Golf Championships is a disc golf tournament that has been held annually since 1999. It is one of the major championships in Women's disc golf along with the PDGA World Championships, the PDGA Champions Cup and the European Open. The event crowns champions in several divisions.

== History ==
For the first three years, the tournament was played alongside the USDGC at Winthrop University. The tournament was known as the "Women's National Championship" for the first two years of its existence before switching to "United States Women's Disc Golf Championships" for the 2001 tournament. From 2002 to 2007 the USWDGC was held each year in Peoria, Illinois. Beginning in 2008 the location of the tournament has rotated throughout the country. In 2013, the six highest-ranked players in the world, and seven of the top ten competed in Portland, Oregon. The 2014 tournament brought in 98 competitors from 21 states. In 2019, Kristin Tattar out dueled the world #1 ranked Paige Pierce to win her first major and to become the first European player to win the USWDGC. The 2020 USWDGC which was scheduled to take place across three courses in Northern California was cancelled due to the COVID-19 pandemic. In 2021, Paige Pierce became the first 4-time winner when she won by 13 strokes. The 2023 USWDGC was won by Kristin Tattar. The victory gave her the Major Grand Slam, having already won the three previous majors in 2023. Tattar was the first woman to accomplish this feat.

== USWDGC FPO Champions ==
Year	Date	Location	Champion	Margin	Payout	First Runner-Up	Second Runner-Up	PDGA
1999	October 8–10	Charlotte, NC	Juliana Korver	35	$225	Beth Tanner	Lesli Todd	PDGA
2000	October 13–15	Rock Hill, SC	Lesli Todd	13	$560	Nadine Larkin	Susan Stephens	PDGA
2001	October 12–14	Rock Hill, SC	Lesli Todd (2)	3	$600	Angela Martin	Susan Stephens	PDGA
2002	September 27–29	Peoria, IL	Des Reading	8	$1,040	Juliana Korver	Elaine King	PDGA
2003	September 26–28	Peoria, IL	Des Reading (2)	2	$1,145	Juliana Korver	Ruth Steele	PDGA
2004	September 24–26	Peoria, IL	Des Reading (3)	1	$895	Juliana Korver	Carrie Berlogar	PDGA
2005	September 23–25	Peoria, IL	Elaine King	8	$1,200	Carrie Berlogar	Des Reading	PDGA
2006	September 29 - October 1	Peoria, IL	Angela Tschiggfrie	11	$1,200	Valarie Jenkins	Des Reading	PDGA
2007	September 29–30	Peoria, IL	Elaine King (2)	4	$1,300	Carrie Berlogar	Des Reading	PDGA
2008	September 19–21	Huntsville, AL	Angela Tschiggfrie (2)	2	$2,500	Valarie Jenkins	Carrie Berlogar	PDGA
2009	September 19–20	Quad City, Iowa	Sarah Stanhope	3	$1,185	Valarie Jenkins	Liz Carr	PDGA
2010	September 24–26	Jacksonville, NC	Valarie Jenkins	7	$1,500	Sarah Stanhope	Carrie Berlogar	PDGA
2011	September 16–18	Round Rock, TX	Valarie Jenkins (2)	8	$1,600	Sarah Stanhope / Liz Lopez	X	PDGA
2012	September 21–23	Huntsville, AL	Catrina Allen	Playoff	$3,160	Paige Pierce	Sarah Hokom	PDGA
2013	September 20–22	Portland, OR	Sarah Hokom	2	$1,400	Catrina Allen	Valarie Jenkins	PDGA
2014	September 19–21	Appling, GA	Paige Pierce	6	$2,300	Valarie Jenkins	Catrina Allen	PDGA
2015	September 25–27	Mid-Ohio, OH	Hannah Leatherman	1	$1,100	Paige Pierce / Catrina Allen	X	PDGA
2016	September 23–25	Sabattus, ME	Sarah Hokom (2)	3	$1,325	Madison Walker	Paige Pierce	PDGA
2017	September 22–24	Johnson City, TN	Paige Pierce (2)	6	$2,200	Jessica Weese	Sarah Hokom	PDGA
2018	September 21–23	Lansing, MI	Paige Pierce (3)	2	$2,040	Vanessa Van Dyken / Holly Finley	X	PDGA
2019	September 20–22	Spotsylvania, VA	Kristin Tattar	4	$2,500	Paige Pierce	Rebecca Cox	PDGA
2020	Cancelled Due to the COVID-19 Pandemic							
2021	May 21–23	Orangevale, Rocklin, Auburn, CA	Paige Pierce (4)	13	$4,400	Hailey King	Ella Hansen	PDGA
2022	Jun 30 - July 3	Madison, WI	Hailey King	1	$7,000	Valerie Mandujano	Ohn Scoggins	PDGA
2023	September 21 - September 24	Burlington, NC	Kristin Tattar (2)	3	$11,000	Ohn Scoggins	Henna Blomroos	PDGA
2024	March 21-24	Round Rock, TX	Missy Gannon	5	$12,000	Eveliina Salonen	Valerie Mandujano	PDGA
2025	June 19-22	Manitowoc, WI	Eveliina Salonen	1	$8,500	Cadence Burge / Hailey King	X	PDGA
2026	July 16-19	Salt Lake City, UT	Silva Saarinen	3	$9,000	Ohn Scoggins	Missy Gannon	PDGA
