= Catrina Allen =

American disc golfer (born 1985)

Personal information
- Nationality: United States
- Born: 1985 (age 40–41) Bellflower, CA
- Height: 5 ft 4 in (163 cm)

Sport
- Sport: Disc golf
- Turned pro: 2011

Catrina Allen is an American professional disc golfer. She is a US Champion and 2 time World Champion, and has been ranked among the top four women in the world between 2012 and 2019.

In 2009, Allen was working as a bartender, and became interested in the sport after caddying for a friend at a tournament. She began playing and won the South Dakota Amateur Championships later that year, and won the US Women's Disc Golf Championship as an Amateur in 2010. Allen entered the professional tour in 2011, winning 15 events and the PDGA Female Rookie of the Year Award. In 2012, Allen became the second woman to win the PDGA Female Player of the Year Award the year after winning Rookie of the Year (Des Reading, 2001–2002). She has won five unique Majors, including the World Championships, and has won the Worlds Mixed Doubles Championships all three times she has competed (2011, 2012 with Paul Ulibarri; 2013 with Will Schusterick).

== Professional career ==
As of August 2021, Allen had 171 career wins in the Open Female division.

=== Major wins ===
Year	Tournament	Stroke Margin	Winning Score	Runner Up	Prize Money
2012	USWDGC	Playoff	-14 (53-49-47-45-58-31=283)	Paige Pierce	$3,160
2014	European Masters	-8	(66-63-67-62=258)	Ragna Bygde	$846
2014	PDGA World Championships	-2	-7 (56-58-49-61-57-59-54-37=431)	Paige Pierce	$2,250
2015	Scandinavian Open	-4	+11 (69-72-69-69=279)	Sarah Hokom	$2,400
2015	European Open	-7	+8 (68-59-68-71=266)	Sarah Hokom	$1,120
2017	European Open	-7	+15 (68-65-66-72=271)	Valarie Jenkins/Henna Blomroos	$1,200
2021	PDGA World Championships	-1	-10 (63-51-63-52-66=295)	Paige Pierce	$6,000

Majors playoff record (1-0)

Year	Tournament	Opponent	Result
2012	US Women's Disc Golf Championship	Paige Pierce	Won

=== National Tour wins ===
Year	Tournament	Stroke Margin	Winning Score	Runner Up	Prize Money
2012	Beaver State Fling	-3	+5 (62-60-64-63=249)	Paige Pierce	$1,500
2012	Vibram Open	-1	(66-68-64-64=262)	Valarie Jenkins	$1,500
2013	Masters Cup	-1	+17 (78-79-76=233)	Valarie Jenkins	$1,355
2013	Kansas City Wide Open	Playoff	-5 (54-57-71-57-27=266)	Paige Pierce	$1,055
2014	Masters Cup	-9	+7 (76-69-78=223)	Valarie Jenkins	$1,000
2015	Ledgestone Insurance Open	Playoff	-3 (53-56-53-53-43=258)	Paige Pierce	$2,600
2016	Memorial Championship	-1	-12 (51-54-59-51=215)	Paige Pierce	$1,700
2016	Glass Blown Open	-17	-4 (55-57-65=177)	Paige Pierce	$1,800
2016	Kansas City Wide Open	-11	+4 (62-62-60=184)	Paige Pierce	$1,070
2016	Masters Cup	-12	+7 (76-76-58=210)	Paige Pierce	$1,800
2016	Beaver State Fling	Playoff	+5 (63-65-60-61=249)	Paige Pierce	$1,750
2016	Brent Hambrick Memorial Open	-20	+6 (81-84-84-29=278)	Sarah Hokom	$1,400
2017	Pittsburg Flying Disc Open	-8	-19 (58-64-57=179)	Paige Pierce	$1,345
2017	Ed Headrick Disc Golf Hall of Fame Classic	-13	-13 (56-64-65=185)	Sarah Hokom	$1,500
2018	Beaver State Fling	Playoff	+6 (61-60-68-61=250)	Paige Pierce	$2,100
2018	Ed Headrick Hall of Fame Classic	-8	+1 (66-69-67=202)	Paige Pierce	$1,700
2019	Dynamic Discs Glass Blown Open	-1	-1 (60-63-65-67=255)	Paige Pierce	$2,000
2019	Santa Cruz Masters Cup	-7	-2 (74-73-57=204)	Paige Pierce	$2.000
2019	Delaware Disc Golf Challenge	-3	-5 (64-67-71=202)	Kristin Tattar	$1,440

NT playoff record (3-1)

Year	Tournament	Opponent	Result
2013	Kansas City Wide Open	Paige Pierce	Won with birdie on first extra hole
2014	Texas State Championships	Paige Pierce	Lost to par on second extra hole
2015	Ledgestone Insurance Open	Paige Pierce	Won with par on first extra hole
2016	Beaver State Fling	Paige Pierce	Won with birdie on first extra hole

=== Disc Golf Pro Tour wins ===
Year	Tournament	Stroke Margin	Winning Score	Runner Up	Prize Money
2016	Ledgestone Insurance Open	-8	(51-50-58-54=213)	Paige Pierce	$2,000
2016	The Green Mountain Championship	-16	-6 (60-61-56=177)	Paige Pierce	$1,000
2016	Disc Golf Pro Tour Finals				
2017	Nick Hyde Memorial	0	(65-60=125)	Paige Pierce	$1,650
2018	Utah Open	-3	+8 (60-62-60=182)	Paige Bjerkaas	$1,365
2019	Waco Annual Charity Open	-5	-12 (64-63-62=189)	Paige Bjerkaas	$1,620
2019	San Francisco Open	-9	-18 (63-56-61=180)	Paige Pierce	$1,690
2020	Ledgestone Insurance Open	-3	-24 (58-52-52-58=220)	Paige Pierce	$1,700
2021	Jonesboro Open	-8	-23 (58-54-63=175)	Paige Pierce	$3,000

=== Summary ===
Competition Tier	Wins	2nd	3rd	Top-5	Events
World Championships	2	1	3	6	6
Other Majors	4	2	2	10	11
National Tour	12	11	11	38	42

=== Annual statistics ===
Year	Events	Wins	Top 3	Earnings	$ / Event	Rating^{†}	World Ranking^{†}
2010	3	1	2	$100	$33.33	875	-
2011	36	15	25	$7,546	$209.61	934	6
2012	37	23	35	$17,790	$480.81	964	2
2013	31	18	28	$17,075	$550.81	957	4
2014	39	31	39	$23,010	$590.00	973	2
2015	31	15	31	$22,289	$719.00	963	2
2016	26^{‡}	21	25	$23,044	$886.31	967	-
Career	203	124	185	$110,854	$546.08	-	-

^{†}At Year End
^{‡} Includes DGPT Championship (not PDGA sanctioned)

=== Major championships timeline ===
Tournament	2010	2011	2012	2013	2014	2015	2016	2017	2018	2019
European Open				3		1		1		3
US Women's Disc Golf Championships		6	1	2	T3	T2	T4	T4	T5	6
PDGA World Championships		5	3	3	1	3	T2	4	T6	3
Other majors	–	5	–	–	–	–		–	3	
Other majors (cont.)	–				1	1				

Tournament	2020	2021	2022	2023
European Open			4	T24
US Women's Disc Golf Championships		T5	T4	T38
PDGA World Championships		1	11	T3
Other majors	2		5	T3

Win
Top 3 finish
Top 10 finish
Did not participate
Tournament not held

== Sponsorship ==
Allen was sponsored by Prodigy Disc, and announced her departure late in 2021.

Following the 2021 season, Allen announced she would be sponsored by DGA.
