= Paige Pierce =

American disc golf player (born 1991)

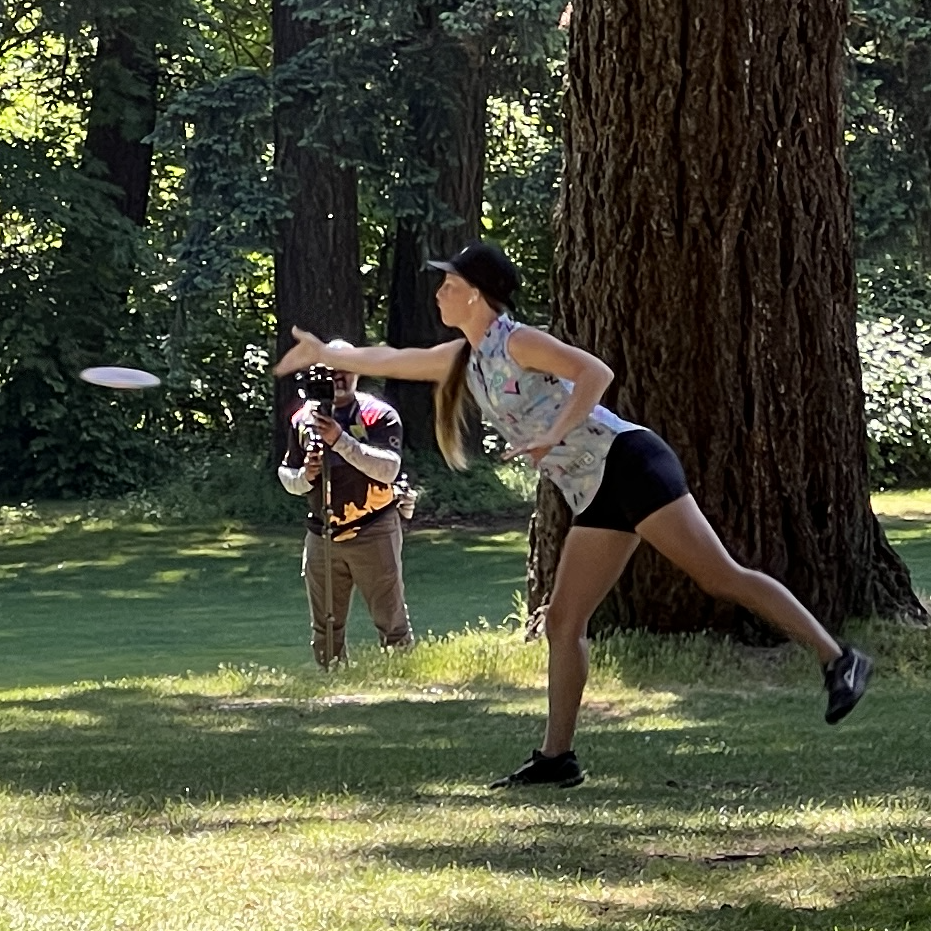
- Pierce putting in 2023

Personal information
- Full name: Paige Ashton Pierce
- Nationality: United States
- Born: 1991 (age 34–35) Plano, TX
- Height: 5 ft 5 in (165 cm)

Sport
- Sport: Disc golf
- Turned pro: 2009

Paige Pierce is a professional disc golfer from Plano, Texas. She has won 5 World Championships and 17 total Major Championships (the most of any female player), and has been consistently ranked among the top professional women since 2011. In 2018 she broke the record for the highest PDGA player rating a woman had ever achieved at 978. Since then she has broken her own record several times, most recently at 996 rated in March 2021.

Pierce began playing disc golf at the age of 4 with her father and his friends. She went professional in 2009 and started touring in 2010.

In addition to holding a number of PDGA National Tour wins, she is the all-time leading women's winner on the Disc Golf Pro Tour, founded 2016 by Steve Dodge and Nate Heinhold, with 30 DGPT wins as of August 2021.

After winning the US Women's Disc Golf Championship in 2014, Pierce made history by becoming the first female to ever win the USDGC Performance Flight division. She narrowly missed qualifying for the Open division in 2015, missing a playoff for the fifth qualifying spot by two strokes. In 2017, she earned a qualification for USDGC at the Aussie Open. In 2018 she once again earned a qualifying spot when she won the United States Women's Disc Golf Championship.

In 2023, while practicing for the PCS Sula Open, Pierce slipped on a bridge on the course and broke her ankle. This led to her taking the rest of the season off, and she was still recovering during the 2024 season. In 2023, she married her partner Ayla Pierce.

== Professional career ==
In addition to Pierce's five World Championships, she also holds two Mixed Doubles World Championships, both with Jeremy Koling.

=== Majors (17) ===
| Year | Tournament | Stroke Margin | Winning score | Runner up | Prize money |
|---|---|---|---|---|---|
| 2011 | PDGA World Championships | -3 | (89-89-91-88-60-28=445) | Valarie Jenkins | $2,000 |
| 2012 | Stockholm Open | -8 | (62-65-65-72=264) | Valarie Jenkins | $1,302 |
| 2013 | Copenhagen Open | -6 | (67-65-72-67=271) | Valarie Jenkins | $931 |
| 2013 | European Open | -17 | (68-79-68-68=283) | Valarie Jenkins | $1,300 |
| 2013 | PDGA World Championships | -1 | (58-63-61-59-56-59-54-35=445) | Valarie Jenkins | $2,000 |
| 2014 | USWDGC | -6 | (55-68-57-72=252) | Valarie Jenkins | $2,300 |
| 2015 | PDGA World Championships | -1 | (68-62-65-65-64-60-32=416) | Sarah Hokom | $2,500 |
| 2017 | Aussie Open 2017 | -20 | (62-64-59-69=254) | Jennifer Allen | $1,100 |
| 2017 | 2017 United States' Women's Disc Golf Championships | -6 | (53-65-61-48=227) | Jessica Weese | $2,200 |
| 2017 | PDGA World Championships | -5 | (65-60-68-66= 259) | Valarie Jenkins | $5,500 |
| 2018 | United States Women's Disc Golf Championships | -2 | (67-59-59-61=246) | Vanessa VanDyken | $2,040 |
| 2019 | European Open | -17 | (61-62-65-66=254) | Henna Blomroos | $2,030 |
| 2019 | PDGA World Championships | -5 | (64-57-59-52-52=284) | Eveliina Salonen | $5,000 |
| 2020 | Women's National Championship | -4 | (60-65-66-68=259) | Catrina Allen | $3,000 |
| 2021 | United States Women's Disc Golf Championships | -13 | (50-47-47=144) | Hailey King | $4,400 |
| 2022 | Champion's Cup | -2 | (68-64-64-67=263) | Kristin Tattar | $8,000 |
| 2022 | European Open | -3 | (71-65-65-63=264) | Eveliina Salonen | $8,000 |

Majors playoff record (0–1)

| Year | Tournament | Opponent | Result |
|---|---|---|---|
| 2012 | US Women's Disc Golf Championship | Catrina Allen | Lost |

=== National Tour and Elite Series (27) ===
| Year | Tournament | Stroke Margin | Winning score | Runner up | Prize money |
|---|---|---|---|---|---|
| 2011 | Memorial Championship | -1 | (58-61-63-56=238) | Valarie Jenkins | $1,300 |
| 2011 | Kansas City Wide Open | -5 | (64-51-70-59=244) | Liz Lopez | $675 |
| 2013 | Memorial Championship | -11 | (54-52-58-52=216) | Valarie Jenkins | $1,600 |
| 2014 | Memorial Championship | -10 | (55-51-54-59=219) | Catrina Allen | $1,600 |
| 2014 | Texas State Championships | Playoff | (72-71-75=218) | Catrina Allen | $857 |
| 2014 | Kansas City Wide Open | -4 | (60-66-58-33=217) | Valarie Jenkins | $900 |
| 2014 | Maple Hill Open | -3 | (64-65-61-65=255) | Catrina Allen | $1,500 |
| 2014 | Rochester Flying Disc Open | -10 | (58-53-56-55=222) | Catrina Allen | $900 |
| 2015 | Memorial Championship | -2 | (55-62-48-61=226) | Valarie Jenkins | $1,775 |
| 2015 | Glass Blown Open | -11 | (58-56-61=175) | Jennifer Allen | $1,200 |
| 2015 | Masters Cup | -7 | (78-72-72=222) | Valarie Jenkins | $1,800 |
| 2015 | Maple Hill Open | -5 | (61-63-59-70=253) | Catrina Allen | $1,600 |
| 2015 | Disc Golf Hall of Fame Classic | -2 | (57-74-67=198) | Valarie Jenkins | $1,300 |
| 2016 | Vibram Open | -1 | (66-63-59-57=245) | Catrina Allen | $1,500 |
| 2017 | Gentlemen's Club Challenge | -3 | (57-60-57-68=242) | Catrina Allen | $2,000 |
| 2017 | Dynamic Discs Glass Blown Open | Tie | (62-55=117) | Hannah Leatherman | $1,500 |
| 2017 | Masters Cup | -9 | (77-73-58=208) | Jennifer Allen | $1,500 |
| 2017 | Beaver State Fling | -18 | (58-60-57-59=234) | Valarie Jenkins | $2,000 |
| 2018 | Las Vegas Challenge | -3 | (64-57-64-59=244) | Sarah Hokom | $2,500 |
| 2018 | Dynamic Discs Glass Blown Open | -2 | (53-61-53=167) | Lisa Fajkus | $2,000 |
| 2018 | Santa Cruz Masters Cup | -12 | (78-73-56=207) | Catrina Allen | $2,000 |
| 2019 | Beaver State Fling | -3 | (60-57-62-66=245) | Catrina Allen | $2,250 |
| 2020 | Memorial Championship | -14 | (48+49+48+55=200) | Jennifer Allen | $1,500 |
| 2020 | Dynamic Discs Open | -10 | (60+61+66=187) | Missy Gannon | $1,500 |
| 2020 | The Preserve Championship | -13 | (55+56+55=166) | Catrina Allen | $1,600 |
| 2020 | Discraft's Great Lakes Open | -6 | (59+58+59=176) | Ellen Widboom | $2,000 |
| 2021 | Master's Cup | +1 | (72+75+79=226) | Catrina Allen | $3,500 |
| 2021 | Las Vegas Challenge | -1 | (52+69+57+62=240) | Catrina Allen | $4,000 |
| 2021 | OTB Open | -1 | (67+65+60=191) | Catrina Allen | $3,000 |
| 2021 | Portland Open | -3 | (61+65+63=189) | Catrina Allen | $3,000 |
| 2021 | Utah Open | -3 | (53+59+60=172) | Catrina Allen | $1,720 |
| 2021 | Ledgestone | -11 | (64+54+54+67=239) | Missy Gannon | $4,000 |
| 2021 | Idlewild Open | -3 | (65+70+65=200) | Missy Gannon | $5,000 |
| 2022 | Texas State Championships | -4 | (58+63+63=184) | Kristin Tattar | $4,000 |
| 2022 | OTB Open | -4 | (67+58+68=197) | Natalie Ryan | $5,500 |
| 2022 | The Preserve | -5 | (57+60+65=182) | Missy Gannon | $5,000 |
| 2023 | Open at Austin | -2 | (61+58+62=181) | Catrina Allen | $4,000 |
| 2023 | OTB Open | -4 | (60+55+61=176) | Ohn Scoggins | $7,400 |
| 2024 | Portland Open | -4 | (65+61+58+60=244) | Holyn Handley | $8,000 |
| 2025 | Green Mountain Championship | Playoff | (61+59+60+61=241) | Ohn Scoggins | $10,000 |

NT playoff record (1–3)

| Year | Tournament | Opponent | Result |
|---|---|---|---|
| 2013 | Kansas City Wide Open | Catrina Allen | Lost to birdie on first extra hole |
| 2014 | Texas State Championships | Catrina Allen | Won with par on second extra hole |
| 2015 | Ledgestone Insurance Open | Catrina Allen | Lost to par on first extra hole |
| 2016 | Beaver State Fling | Catrina Allen | Lost to birdie on first extra hole |

=== Summary ===
| Competition Tier | Wins | 2nd | 3rd | Top-5 | Events* |
|---|---|---|---|---|---|
| World Championships | 5 | 4 | 0 | 7 | 11 |
| Other Majors | 10 | 4 | 2 | 14 | 16 |
| National Tour | 27 | 15 | 5 | 42 | 45 |

*As of January 1, 2017

=== Annual statistics ===
| Year | Events | Wins | Top 3 | Earnings | $ / Event | Rating ^{†} | World Rankings^{†} |
|---|---|---|---|---|---|---|---|
| 2007 | 2 | 0 | 2 | $0 | $0 | 890 | - |
| 2008 | 2 | 0 | 1 | $0 | $0 | 899 | 35 |
| 2009 | 3 | 0 | 1 | $50 | $16.67 | 904 | 35 |
| 2010 | 17 | 1 | 8 | $3,643 | $214.29 | 934 | 8 |
| 2011 | 29 | 13 | 22 | $11,249 | $387.90 | 948 | 4 |
| 2012 | 27 | 9 | 24 | $12,209 | $452.19 | 960 | 4 |
| 2013 | 26 | 11 | 23 | $18,128 | $697.23 | 961 | 3 |
| 2014 | 24 | 14 | 22 | $17,661 | $735.88 | 976 | 1 |
| 2015 | 29 | 20 | 27 | $26,571 | $916.24 | 962 | 1 |
| 2016 | 21 | 7 | 20 | $18,556 | $883.62 | 958 | 3 |
| 2017 | 27 | 21 | 24 | $36,328 | $1,345.48 | 975 | 1 |
| 2018 | 24 | 15 | 21 | $26,877 | $1,119.88 | 969 | 1 |
| 2019 | 24 | 13 | 21 | $33,630 | $1,401.25 | 979 | 1 |
| 2020 | 14 | 8 | 11 | $28,114 | $2,008 | 991 | 1 |
| Career | 269 | 119 | 227 | $254,698 | - | - | - |

^{†}At Year End

=== Major championships timeline ===
| Tournament | 2010 | 2011 | 2012 | 2013 | 2014 | 2015 | 2016 | 2017 | 2018 | 2019 |
|---|---|---|---|---|---|---|---|---|---|---|
| European Open | | 2 | | 1 | | 4 | | | | 1 |
| US Women's Disc Golf Championships | 5 | 5 | 2 | T7 | 1 | T2 | 3 | 1 | 1 | 2 |
| PDGA World Championships | 5 | 1 | 7 | 1 | 2 | 1 | T2 | 1 | 2 | 1 |
| Other majors | – | 4 | 1 | 1 | 2 | – | | 1 | – | |
| Other majors (cont.) | – | | | | T3 | – | | | | |

| Tournament | 2020 | 2021 | 2022 | 2023 |
|---|---|---|---|---|
| European Open | | | 1 | |
| US Women's Disc Golf Championships | | 1 | T21 | |
| PDGA World Championships | | 2 | T5 | |
| Other majors | 1 | | 1 | 29 |

Win
Top 3 finish
Top 10 finish
Did not participate
Tournament not held
