= Flying disc at the 2009 World Games =

- Venue: World Games Stadium
- Dates: 19–21 July 2009
- Competitors: 36 from 6 nations

The Flying disc event at the World Games 2009 in Kaohsiung was played between 19 and 21 July.

Ultimate is the only current event. The Ultimate tournament features just 6 teams. The top 5 teams from the previous years World Ultimate Championships mixed division and the host country. The tournament was played with six players per side, with three women and three men on the field from each team.

== Medalists ==
Event	Gold	Silver	Bronze
Ultimate (mixed)	United States (USA); Chelsea Putnam; Gwen Ambler; Cara Crouch; Gabriel Saunkeah; Seth Wiggins; Sam Chatterton-Kirchmeier; Catherine Foster; Alicia White; Jonathan Remucal; Bartholomew Watson; Deborah Cussen; Beaufort Kittredge; Dylan Tunnelln	Japan (JPN); Sachiko Sameshima; Satoshi Senda; Yuki Mori; Masashi Kurono; Ayumi Fujioka; Masahiro Matsuno; Eri Hirai; Moe Sameshima; Yohei Abe; Satoro Sameshima; Asami Ishitsu; Kei Sasakawa; Mizuho Tanaka	Australia (AUS); Michael Neild; Lauren Brown; Katie Bradstock; Anthony Dowle; Timothy Lavis; Diana Worman; Matthew Dowle; Ashleigh Martens; Jonathan Holmes; Peter Gardner; Keah Molomby; Peter Blakeley; Elizabeth Edye

== See also ==
- Flying disc at the World Games
