= Natalie Ryan =

American disc golfer

Natalie Ryan (born 1993 or 1994) is an American professional disc golfer. She went professional with disc golf in 2019. She saw two Elite Series victories in the sport in 2022. Ryan, a transgender woman, was disqualified from the professional women's division by restrictive gender eligibility guidelines adopted by the main governing body of disc golf in January 2023. After multiple legal battles, Ryan settled with the Professional Disc Golf Association and Disc Golf Pro Tour in December 2023, and she was once again able to compete in the women's division.

== Biography ==
Natalie Ryan was born in either 1993 or 1994. She is from the state of Virginia.

Ryan first played disc golf in 2017 on the second date with her future fiancé. She became a member of the Professional Disc Golf Association (PDGA) in 2018. She began competing in sanctioned disc golf events in 2019. According to Ryan, around 2019, she was outed as a transgender woman to her fellow disc golfers by a stalker. Ryan had her first professional disc golf win in June 2019.

Ryan saw her first Elite Series victory at the Discraft Great Lakes Open in Milford, Michigan, in July 2022. In September 2022, she won her second Elite Series victory at the MVP Open in Leicester, Massachusetts. She was the first transgender competitor to win the MVP Open Disc Golf title. In 2022, Ryan was sponsored by Neptune Discs. The sponsorship was renewed for five years in 2023.

On December 12, 2022, the PDGA and Disc Golf Pro Tour (DGPT) announced a stricter gender eligibility policy for the Female Professional Open (FPO) division. Previously, the organizations' gender eligibility policies had been similar to the International Olympic Committee's 2015 policy, however the new policy was more similar to the FINA guidelines. One part of the new guideline which effectively disqualified most transgender women was the requirement that a transgender woman have started a medical transition before puberty or age 12. The policy was set to take effect January 1, 2023. The prepubescent transition policy was to affect tours run by the DGPT, the Silver and Elite Series, as well as the Pro Majors run by the PDGA. Ryan was one among several other transgender competitors disqualified by the guidelines.

By December 14, Ryan had threatened legal action in regard to her exclusion from the FPO division. On February 22, 2023, Ryan filed a complaint in the District Court for the Eastern District of California against the PDGA and DGPT. Ryan made arguments for her case under California state law, specifically the anti-discrimination protections provided by the Unruh Civil Rights Act. Among the legal remedies sought by Ryan was an injunction allowing her to play in the FPO division for the OTB Open in Stockton, California in May. In early May, Ryan's lawyer requested a temporary restraining order allowing her to play in the OTB Open. District Judge Troy Nunley granted the order on May 11. The PDGA and DGPT filed an appeal of the order, and their appeal succeeded in the Court of Appeals for the Ninth Circuit on May 12. By this time, Ryan had already played in the first round of the OTB Open. In the first round, she had been in fifth place, behind four athletes tied for first. She was disqualified from further competition by the successful appeal.

In June 2023, Ryan was granted a temporary injunction in district court to compete in the FPO division of a disc golf competition in Clearwater, Minnesota. She came in 14th place in this event.

To avoid further litigation by Ryan, on July 14, the DGPT announced the cancellation of five 2023 FPO division events in jurisdictions with strong anti-discrimination laws, including Illinois, Michigan, Massachusetts, New York, and Canada. The ones in New York and Canada were to be fully cancelled, while the rest were to be relocated to jurisdictions where litigation was less likely. By July 25, the DGPT had reversed its decision, reinstating the FPO events under a new United Series designation in the formerly cancelled events. The United Series was to allow both transgender and cisgender women to compete. Other 2023 FPO events in jurisdictions such as Missouri, Kentucky, and North Carolina would continue to use the more restrictive gender eligibility policy. Ryan continued pre-existing litigation against the PDGA and DGPT.

By December 22, 2023, the PDGA and DGPT announced they would be removing the prepubescent medical transition requirement from their gender eligibility policy. The updated policy was to come into effect on January 1, 2024, and was due to a settlement with Ryan.

Following the settlement, Ryan joined the 2024 season tour. During one of the competitions of the 2024 season, the Music City Open in Nashville, the second round was suspended for about two hours in response to violent threats levied against a competitor in the event on April 20. Competitors were given extra security in response to the threats. Ryan later confirmed on social media she was one of the competitors targeted by the threats. Ryan finished in 15th place at the event.
