= Flying disc at the 2001 World Games =

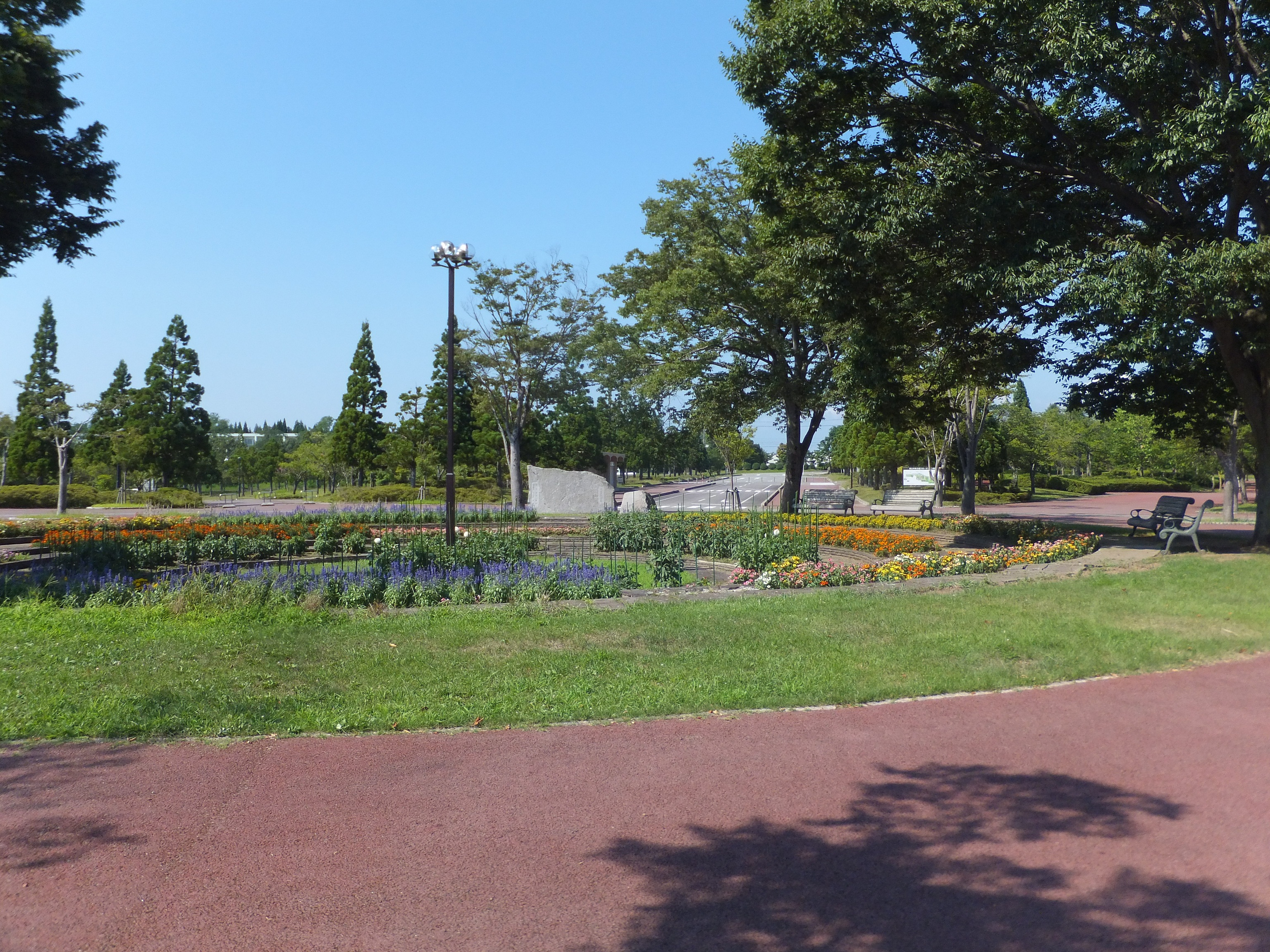
- Akita Prefectural Central Park
- Venues: Akita Prefectural Central Park Disc Golf Course (disc golf); Akita Prefectural Central Park Football Studiume (ultimate)
- Dates: 17–21 August 2001
- Competitors: 72 from 8 nations

The flying disc events at the 2001 World Games in Akita was played between 17 and 21 August. 72 athletes, from 8 nations, participated in the tournament. The competition took place at Akita Prefectural Central Park Football Studiume, where matches of ultimate were played and on Akita Prefectural Central Park Disc Golf Course, where disc golf was held.

== Participating nations ==
- Canada (12)
- Finland (10)
- Germany (10)
- Great Britain (2)
- Japan (12)
- New Zealand (2)
- Sweden (12)
- United States (12)

== Medal table ==
Rank	Nation	Gold	Silver	Bronze	Total
1	United States	2	1	0	3
2	Canada	1	1	0	2
3	Sweden	0	1	1	2
4	Great Britain	0	0	1	1
Totals (4 entries)		3	3	2	8

== Events ==
Event	Gold	Silver	Bronze
Ultimate	Canada; Allan Nichols; Anja Haman; Jeff Cruickshank; Jill Calkin; Kirk Savage; Leslie Calder; Marc Seraglia; Mike Grant; Su-Ning Strube; Victoria Chow	United States; Billy Rodriguez; Christine Dunlap; Damien Scott; Dana Green; Dominique Fontenette; Heidi Pomfret; Justin Safdie; Steve Dugan; Johanna Neumann; Fortunat Mueller	Japan; Ayuko Sonoda; Fuminori Ishizuka; Hiroko Misui; Kaori Nasu; Kimiyo Yano; Makiko Iida; Masato Okada; Yasushi Yamamoto; Yohei Kichikawa; Yoshinori Nasu
Men's disc golf	Barry Schultz; United States	Michael Sullivan; Canada	Jesper Lundmark; Sweden
Women's disc golf	Juliana Korver; United States	Niloofar Mosavar Rahmani; Sweden	Ruth Steele; Great Britain
