= Flying disc at the 2017 World Games =

Flying disc competition at the 2017 World Games

- Venue: Marsowe Fields
- Location: Wrocław
- Dates: 21–23 July 2017
- Competitors: 84
- Teams: 6

Medalists
gold medal	United States
silver medal	Colombia
bronze medal	Canada

The flying disc event at the 2017 World Games took place in Wrocław, Poland.

== Qualified teams ==
Team	Finals appearance	Previous appearance
Australia	4th	2013
Canada	5th	2013
Colombia	3rd	2013
Japan	4th	2013
Poland	1st	Debut
United States	5th	2013

== Round robin ==
=== Standings ===
Team	Pld	W	L	GF	GA	GD	Pts
Colombia	5	4	1	62	51	+11	4
United States	4	3	1	51	37	+14	3
Canada	5	3	2	61	44	+17	3
Australia	5	3	2	55	55	0	3
Japan	5	1	4	45	60	−15	1
Poland	4	0	4	25	52	−27	0

Source: Resultbook

=== Matches ===
21 July 2017
9:00

Canada	13–3	Poland

Marsowe Fields, Wrocław
21 July 2017
10:45

Australia	13–11	Japan

Marsowe Fields, Wrocław
21 July 2017
12:30

United States	12–13	Colombia

Marsowe Fields, Wrocław
21 July 2017
15:00

Australia	13–8	Poland

Marsowe Fields, Wrocław
21 July 2017
16:45

Japan	8–13	Colombia

Marsowe Fields, Wrocław
21 July 2017
18:30

United States	13–10	Canada

Marsowe Fields, Wrocław

22 July 2017
9:00

Japan	13–8	Poland

Marsowe Fields, Wrocław
22 July 2017
10:45

Canada	12–13	Colombia

Marsowe Fields, Wrocław
22 July 2017
12:30

United States	13–7	Australia

Marsowe Fields, Wrocław
22 July 2017
15:00

Colombia	13–6	Poland

Marsowe Fields, Wrocław
22 July 2017
16:45

Australia	9–13	Canada

Marsowe Fields, Wrocław
22 July 2017
18:30

United States	13–7	Japan

Marsowe Fields, Wrocław

23 July 2017
9:00

Australia	13–10	Colombia

Marsowe Fields, Wrocław
23 July 2017
10:45

Canada	13–6	Japan

Marsowe Fields, Wrocław
23 July 2017
12:30

United States	Cancelled	Poland

Marsowe Fields, Wrocław

== Medal matches ==
=== Bronze medal match ===
23 July 2017
15:00

Canada	13–11	Australia

Marsowe Fields, Wrocław

=== Gold medal match ===
23 July 2017
17:00

Colombia	7–13	United States

Marsowe Fields, Wrocław

== Final ranking ==
Rank	Team
Gold medal	United States
Silver medal	Colombia
Bronze medal	Canada
4	Australia
5	Japan
6	Poland
