= Sarah Hokom =

American professional disc golfer (born 1982)

Personal information
- Nationality: United States
- Born: December 6, 1982 (age 43) Caldwell, ID
- Height: 5 ft 10 in (178 cm)

Sport
- Sport: Disc golf
- Turned pro: 2008

Sarah Hokom is an American professional disc golfer. She is a former World Champion and 2-time US Women’s Champion. Hokom is known best for her sidearm drives.

Hokom became a touring professional in 2009, and was sponsored by Discraft. She won her first PDGA National Tour (NT) event, King of the Lake, in 2011, and followed up with two additional NT wins that year, finishing in second place behind Valarie Jenkins in the Series by a single point. Hokom went on to win the World Championships in 2012. She switched sponsors in 2013 to Prodigy Disc and won her first US Women’s Disc Golf Championship. In 2015, Hokom switched sponsors again to Legacy Discs and launched her own disc golf retail company, Cali Connection Disc Golf. In 2018 Sarah joined Team MVP and is currently sponsored by MVP Disc Sports.

== Professional career ==
Since 2008, Hokom has won 60 professional events, including 3 majors and 6 NT events. In 2016, she won the inaugural Disc Golf Pro Tour Points Series. In 2017, she finished second in the Disc Golf Pro Tour Points Series, finishing in second place at five of the nine events, and tying for first place at the weather shorted Nick Hyde Memorial. Throughout her career Hokom has been one of the more outspoken players advocating for women in the sport and in 2017 she suggested changes to the payout structure for the Open Women's division at PDGA sanctioned events.

=== Major wins ===
Year	Tournament	Stroke Margin	Winning Score	Runner Up	Prize Money
2012	PDGA World Championships	-1	-7 (50-57-56-48-52-55-53-32=403)	Valarie Jenkins	$2,000
2013	USWDGC	-2	-20 (59-51-48-64=222)	Catrina Allen	$1,400
2016	USWDGC	-3	-3 (61-59-55-66=241)	Madison Walker	$1,325

=== National Tour wins ===
Year	Tournament	Stroke Margin	Winning Score	Runner Up	Prize Money
2011	King of the Lake	-2	(59-66-55-65=245)	Catrina Allen	$415
2011	Pittsburgh Flying Disc Open	-4	-3 (65-67-66-57=255)	Paige Pierce	$700
2011	Vibram Open	-1	(67-67-64=198)	Sarah Stanhope	$2,000
2012	Masters Cup	-6	+11 (84-82-88=254)	Valarie Jenkins/Catrina Allen	$1,055
2013	Texas State Championships	-9	+12 (80-79-72=231)	Catrina Allen	$845
2013	Great Lakes Open	-1	+3 (63-61-65=189)	Paige Pierce	$1,000

=== Summary ===
Competition Tier	Wins	2nd	3rd	Top-5	Events
World Championships	1	1	0	3	7
Other Majors	2	2	2	8	13
National Tour	6	6	5	32	47

=== Annual statistics ===
Year	Events	Wins	Top 3	Earnings	$ / Event	Rating^{†}	World Rankings^{†}
2008	12	3	8	$1,118	$93.17	883	-
2009	21	6	13	$1,320	$62.86	878	-
2010	28	13	19	$4,313	$154.04	925	8
2011	21	7	16	$8,526	$406.00	955	5
2012	22	10	18	$11,433	$519.68	960	3
2013	25	11	17	$13,330	$533.20	959	5
2014	23	1	11	$4,507	$195.96	933	8
2015	19	2	11	$12,262	$645.37	949	3
2016	18^{‡}	7	16	$13,806	$727.00	952	-
2017	26	7	17	$19,312	$742.77	960	
2018	30	10	23	$24,770	$825.67	963	
2019	27	8	14	$20,641	$764.48	966	
2020	15	5	11	$13,523	$901.53	967	
2021	24	2	13	$41,932	$1,747.17	968	
Career	311	92	207	$190,793	$613.48	-	-

^{†}At Year End
^{‡} Includes DGPT Championship (not PDGA sanctioned)

== Equipment ==
Hokom is sponsored by MVP discs starting in 2019.
