= European Open (disc golf) =

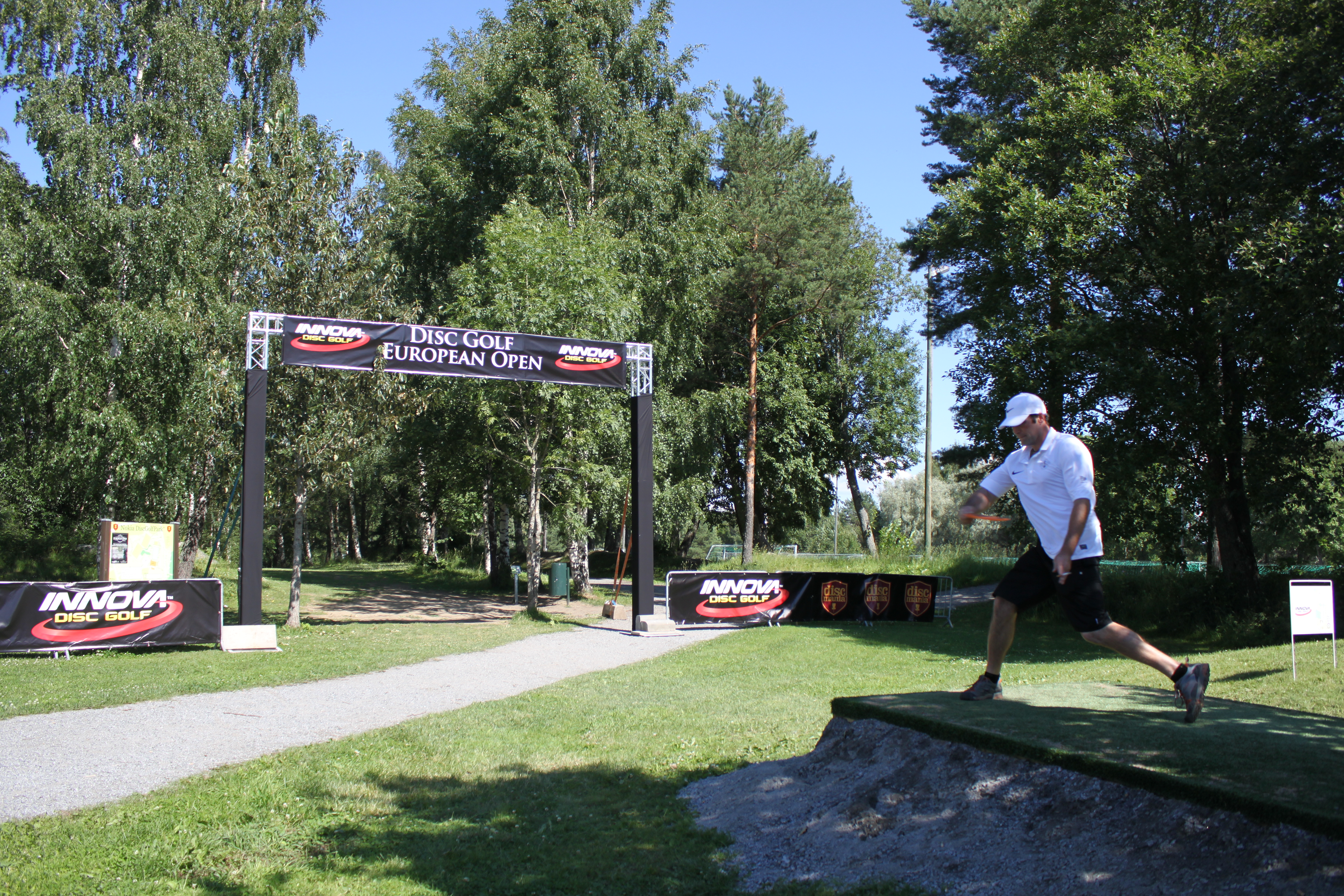
- David Feldberg practicing in 2011

Tournament information
- Location: Nokia, Finland
- Established: 2006
- Courses: Epilä Frisbeepuisto (2006); Nokia DiscGolfPark; Tampere Disc Golf Center
- Prize fund: 101,758$ (2023)
- Month played: July

Current champion
- Gannon Buhr (USA); Kristin Tattar (EST)

Final champion
- Location in Finland Nokia DiscGolfPark (Pirkanmaa)

The European Open is a PDGA-sanctioned major disc golf tournament held in Nokia, Finland. The first European Open was held in 2006 on the Epilä course, in Tampere. In 2011, the tournament was relocated to Nokia, 15 kilometres outside Tampere. The reigning champions are Gannon Buhr in the mixed pro open division and Kristin Tattar in the female pro open division. Buhr is from the United States, while Tattar represents Estonia.

== Winners ==
European Open winners
Open			Open Female		
Year	Winner	Score	Year	Winner	Score
2006	(United States) David Feldberg	193	2006	(United States) Carrie Berlogar	241
2007	(United States) Ken Climo	205	2007	(United States) Carrie Berlogar (2)	238
2009	(Sweden) Jesper Lundmark	202	2009	(United States) Valarie Jenkins	252
2011	(United States) David Feldberg (2)	221	2011	(United States) Valarie Jenkins (2)	275
2013	(United States) Paul McBeth	228	2013	(United States) Paige Pierce	283
2015	(United States) Paul McBeth (2)	225	2015	(United States) Catrina Allen	266
2016	(United States) Paul McBeth (3)	170			
2017	(United States) Paul McBeth (4)	219	2017	(United States) Catrina Allen (2)	271
2019	(United States) Paul McBeth (5)	223	2019	(United States) Paige Pierce (2)	254
2022	(United States) Eagle McMahon	210	2022	(United States) Paige Pierce (3)	264
2023	(United States) Corey Ellis	219	2023	(Estonia) Kristin Tattar	249

== Prize money ==
Year	Pro purse
2013	$108,600 609
2011	$93,400 175
2009	$98,700 938
2007	$77,000
2006	$79,700
