= Gannon Buhr =

American disc golfer (born 2005)

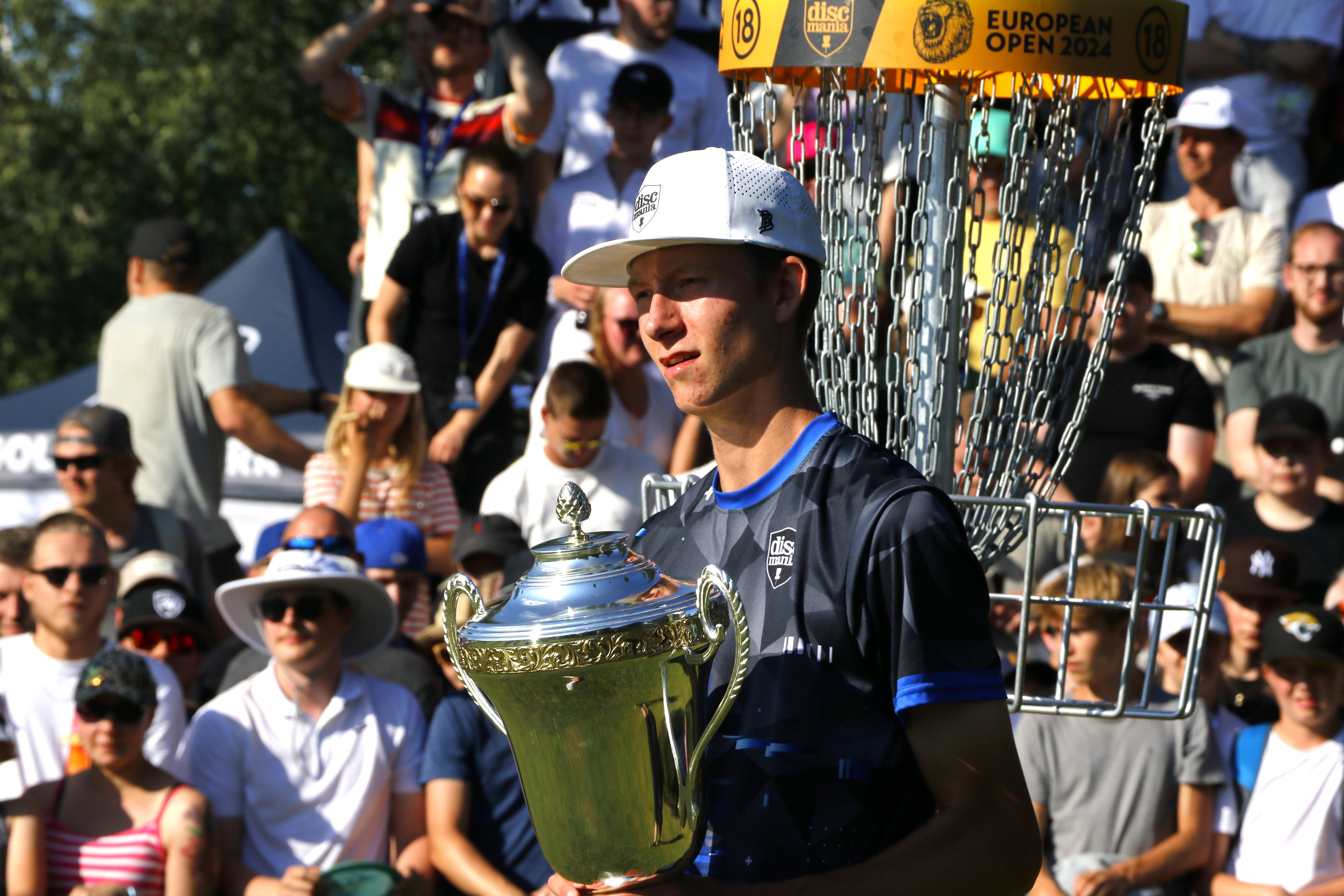
- Gannon Buhr with the 2024 European Open trophy.

Personal information
- Nationality: USA
- Born: May 7, 2005 (age 21) Urbandale, IA
- Height: 6 ft 6 in (198 cm)
- Website: gannonbuhr.com

Sport
- Sport: Disc golf
- Turned pro: 2021
Medal record
Representing the United States
World Games
Gold medal – first place	2025 Chengdu	Mixed doubles

Gannon Buhr is a professional disc golfer who won his first major at the age of 17 in 2022, becoming the second youngest player to win a major and the youngest to win the United States Disc Golf Championship. Buhr won his second major by winning the 2024 European Open in Tampere, Finland, and earned a world title by winning the 2025 PDGA World Championships in Nokia, Finland. As of 2026 he is now also the #1 ranked disc golfer in the world.

In February 2023, Buhr was sued by sponsor Prodigy Discs for attempted early termination of his endorsement contract. The lawsuit was dropped after Buhr agreed to complete his contract, which extended through the rest of 2023. In January 2024, Buhr signed a three-year deal with Discmania.
