= Kristin Lätt =

Estonian professional disc golfer

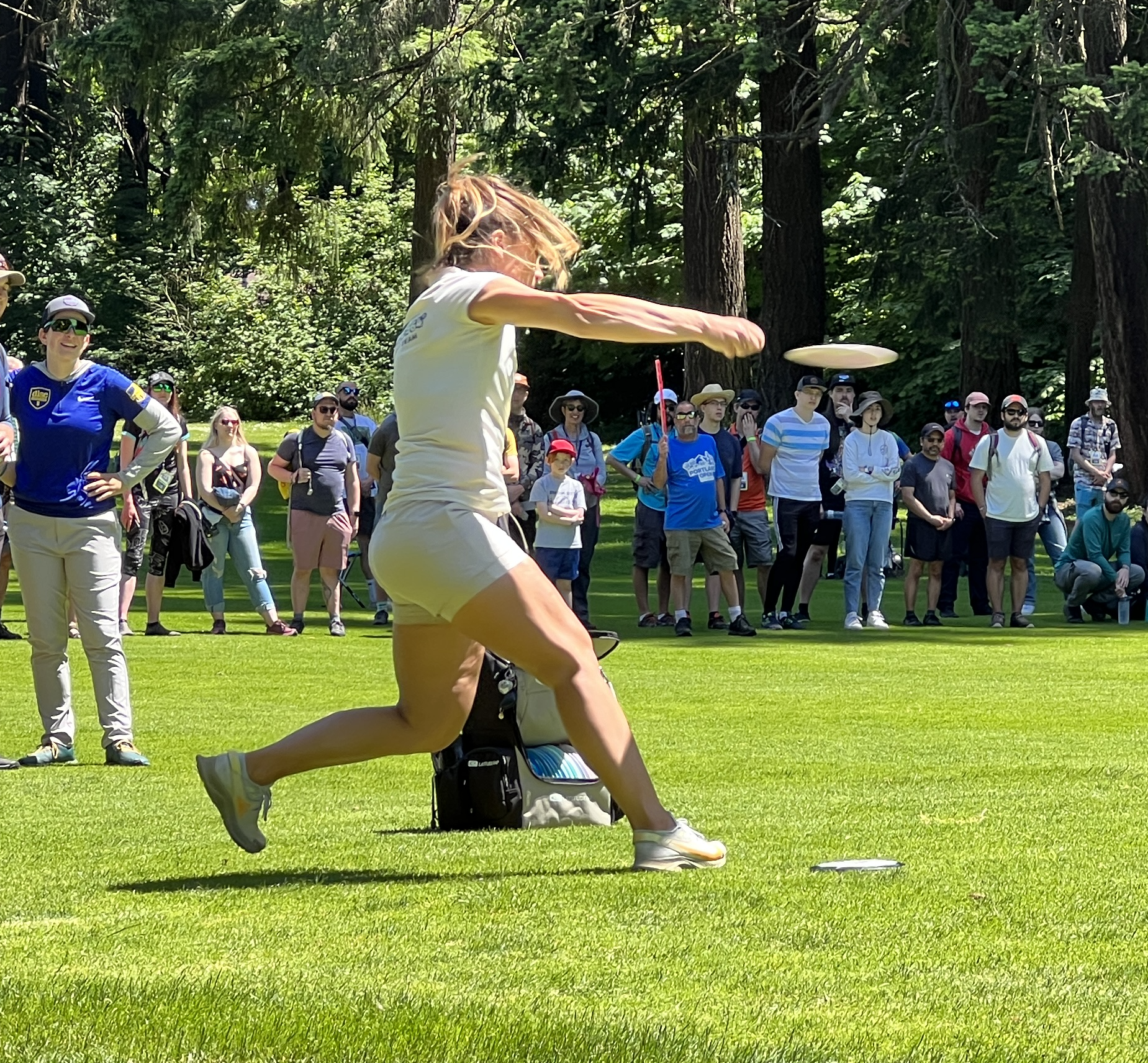
- Lätt throwing a shot in 2023

Personal information
- Full name: Kristin Lätt (born Kristin Tattar)
- Nationality: Estonia
- Born: 3 July 1992 (age 34) Pärnu, Estonia
- Spouse: Silver Lätt

Sport
- Sport: Disc golf
- Turned pro: 2015
- Retired: 2025

Kristin Lätt (née Tattar; born 3 July 1992 in Pärnu) is an Estonian professional disc golfer and former competitive cross-country skier. In 2022 she became the female disc golf world champion for the first time. Lätt is the only female disc golfer in history to achieve a PDGA rating of 1000 or better (which happened in 2024), and is widely considered one of the greatest disc golfers in the history of the sport.

== Biography ==
Kristin Lätt graduated from the Otepää branch of the Audentes Sports School in 2011. After high school she went to Tartu and began studies at The Faculty of Law of the University of Tartu.

She is a former member of the Estonian youth ski team and a two-time Estonian skiing champion as a youth. In 2011, Lätt gave up skiing due to ill health and started looking for new challenges. Three years later at age 22, she found disc golf and became a professional a year later. In November 2017 she, together with husband Silver Lätt, co-founded DG Academy, where both are coaches. DG Academy offers disc golf instruction, as well as weekly training sessions. They also work with course design and organization of various disc golf events and competitions. Since 2018, Lätt has been fully committed to a career in disc golf, both as a competitor and representative, and through the company she co-founded with her husband. In 2021, her representative disc golf manufacturing company, Latitude 64° of Sweden signed her to a contract valued at up to US$500,000 for 4 years.

== Disc golf career ==
Lätt has been a member of the PDGA since 2015 and has competed in a large number of tournaments in Estonia, Europe, and the USA during the time. According to the PDGA she has won more than one half of the events she has entered.

In 2024, Lätt became the first female player to achieve a 1000 PDGA rating.

Lätt showed the potential for disc golf success from the very beginning. In 2014 she took part in the Estonian championship for the first time and won first place and a gold medal. From then on she won just about every title there is to be won in Estonia, including becoming a six-time women's champion and a three-time doubles champion.

=== 2018 Season and First Tour in The United States ===
In 2018 she embarked on her first tour of the US, which represents the world's best disc golfers (the Disc Golf Pro Tour), for part of the season. She participated in the Delaware Disc Golf Challenge and the US Women's Disc Golf Championship, finishing 2nd and 4th respectively.

=== 2019 Season and Second Tour in The United States, First Major Championship ===
In 2019, Lätt decided to compete in even more events in North America, having her most successful year to up until that time. During her tour she won first place in the Canadian Open, and also won the US Women's Disc Golf Championship. The latter win, her very first major title, qualified her to compete against the men in the US Disc Golf Championship later that year. She was the first European to win the US Women's title.

=== 2020 Season ===
Due to the COVID-19 pandemic, Lätt was relegated to only being able to compete in Europe. During this season she competed in 7 events, winning 5 and placing 2nd in the other two.

=== 2021 Season – All Top Five Finishes ===
The 2021 World Championships were scheduled to be held in Ogden, Utah in June. In order to travel to the United States due to US requirements related to the COVID pandemic, Europeans needed to quarantine for a minimum of 14 days outside the Schengen area of Europe before they could receive appropriate travel visas. For Lätt and other Estonians wishing to make it for the World Championships, this meant a minimum two week-stay in Croatia, away from family, before getting the opportunity to fly without restrictions to New York City and then on to Salt Lake City and Ogden. She arrived just four days before the competition was to begin and on her first practice day for what was, in essence, her first big tournament of the year (Worlds), she became ill on the course due to a combination of travel fatigue (possibly jet lag) and unusually high temperatures in Utah for that time of year. Given the circumstances she played reasonable well, placing 5th at the World Championships. She then remained in North America for a 5 additional events tournament stretch, finishing 3rd at the Des Moines Challenge and winning the four other events – Clash at the Canyons V, Discraft's CCR Open, Discraft's Great Lakes Open (aka DGLO), and The Preserve Championships. With an exciting signature win over 5-time World Champion Paige Pierce at DGLO, Lätt became one of the professional women favorites for every tournament she entered from that point forward.

=== 2022 Season – World Champion ===
The 2022 season proved her most successful to date. She joined the Disc Golf Pro Tour full time beginning in February. From her first event she built upon the previous season's 6 straight top 5 finishes (among National Tour, Elite Series, Silver Series or Major level events). In her first 8 events she finished no lower than 3rd place, winning the Memorial Championships, the Jonesboro Open, and the Dynamic Discs Open. An elbow injury sidelined Lätt for the middle part of the season, causing her to return to Estonia and nurse her elbow back to health. She even was not able to compete in the two events where the DGPT moved into Europe for the first time, the PCS Sula Open in Norway and the European Open in Finland. She returned to the US for the Ledgestone Open, finishing 3rd. She followed with a win at Des Moines before prepping for the World Championships. Lätt had the likely best tournament of her career at the World Championships, scoring three of her four highest-rated career rounds to date during the 5-round event, which she ultimately won in commanding fashion by 8 strokes. By doing so, Lätt became the first mother, the first Estonian, and only the second European to win the title. She then continued her streak of podium finishes through 5 more events, winning at the Butler County Classic, the Green Mountain Championships, and the Disc Golf Pro Tour Championships. With her win at the DGPT Tour Championships, Lätt became the first pro disc golfer, man or woman, to have a yearly tournament winnings total over US$100,000.

=== 2023 Season – back-to-back World Champion, the Grand Slam, and pursuit of more records ===
Lätt began the 2023 pro season winning her first event at the Waco Annual Charity Open, coming back from 4 strokes down with 3 holes to play to win by 1 with a 30-foot wind putt on the final hole. Her historic streak of podium finishes ended at the Open at Austin on March 19, when she placed 5th following a tough final round. Her string of finishing no lower than 3rd place totaled 19 consecutive of the top tier tournaments from July 2021 through March 2023. She then went on to win three of her next five events, pro tour wins at the Music City Open and Blue Ridge Championship, and her second straight major win (third overall) at the PDGA Champions Cup. She finished 6th in her next event before returning to Europe for an extended break at the end of April.

Lätt returned to play in the US in June, winning 3 of her next 5 pro tour events – Portland Open, Zoo Town Open, and Des Moines Challenge – before the pro tour headed to Europe. There, she won the PCS Open in Norway; the European Open in Finland, her second major of the year; and the European Championships in her home country of Estonia. She returned to the US for the opportunity to defend her title as the World Championships were held in Jeffersonville, Vermont. At the Worlds, she was dominant getting out to a big lead by shooting the best round of the tournament field the first two rounds. In a wire-to wire win, she led each round of the World Championships by no fewer than 4 strokes and won the tournament by 6. With that win Lätt became only the tenth woman ever with multiple World Championship titles, the first to successfully defend a World Championship title since Valarie Jenkins 2007–2009, the first woman to capture the first three majors of the year, and only the third woman to win four majors in a row, the first in more than 20 years. In mid-September, Lätt became the highest rated female player of all-time achieving a 999 rating, eclipsing Paige Pierce's mark of 996 set in 2021. At the US Women's Championships in September she became the first female pro open disc golfer to win the Grand Slam of all four Major Tournaments in the same calendar year, winning by 3 strokes. This win was also her fifth consecutive Major win (going back to the 2022 Worlds), making her the first woman to accomplish 5 in a row in over 20 years. Throughout the 2023 singles season, Lätt won 12 of her 19 singles events on the year, placing 2nd four times, and once in 4th, once 5th, and once 6th.

=== 2024 Season – First woman to reach 1000 rating, Seventh Major Title ===
Lätt began her first tour of the US in 2024 with a win at the DGPT Waco Annual Charity Open, and later in the season posted wins at the DGPT Play it Again Sports Open in Jonesboro, Arkansas, the Persimmon Ridge Retreat in Grenbrier, and the Music City Open in Nashville. At the regular PDGA ratings update on May 14, Kristin Lätt became the first female to reach the 1000 rating.

2024 was another successful season for Lätt. She competed in 18 FPO singles events winning 8, finishing second 5 times, and third 2 times. One key win was her seventh major title at the European Open, where she smashed the record for largest final day comeback at a major. Entering the final day in third place and 7 strokes out of first, Lätt erased the deficit by hole 10, and then held on to win by 1. Lätt's record was also the largest final day comeback to victory at any Elite Series or National Tour until bested by Eveliina Salonen at the Kansas City Wide Open in April of 2026. Lätt still holds the record final day comeback at a major. Lätt's other wins in 2024 came at the Krokhol Open, Green Mountain Championships, and her first Throw Pink Women's Disc Golf Championship.

=== 2025 Season – Early highs, followed by injury and struggles; ending with indefinite hiatus from competition ===
Kristin Lätt began her 2025 pro season at the Waco Annual Charity Open. She won the tournament in dominating fashion, averaging 1014.6 for the event and winning by seven strokes. Of her first seven events of the year, she placed first four times and second three times. Included in this stretch was a dramatic come-from-behind win at the Music City Open. Lätt was trailing Silva Saarinen of Finland by three strokes with two holes to play in the final round. However, she birdied the difficult hole 17 while Saarinen bogeyed, setting up a one-stroke tight race in the eighteenth. The 429’ par-three 18th hole had been birdied by Lätt in round one, but Saarinen had birdied it both previous rounds. However, the wind was markedly different with both players facing a stiff headwind unlike the previous two rounds. Under pressure, Lätt sent her drive to within 10 feet of the pin against the wind while Saarinen could get no closer than a slightly obstructed 35-footer. When Saarinen missed her birdie attempt, Lätt was able to make her short putt to force a playoff. In the first playoff hole Lätt birdied once again and Saarinen could not match it, giving Lätt her 3rd consecutive victory in as many seasons at Music City.

==== Signs of the end of dominance ====
Unlike the three previous seasons, Lätt did not take a mid-year break in touring this season. This was the first season in PDGA history where the World Championships would be held in Europe. Also, because Worlds was being held at the typical site of the European Open, the European Major of 2025 would be held at the European Disc Golf Festival in her home country of Estonia. So despite a toe injury, she continued touring through the entire European swing. At the first event in Europe, the Ale Open, Kristin faltered in the last two rounds. After a 1000-rated round one she ended up losing a 7-stroke round one lead in the next two rounds to Saarinen who scored her first victory over Lätt, who finished second, one stroke behind. She finished second again at the Preserve Championship in Minnesota before coming in 6th at the US Women's Disc Golf Championships Major. The tour then shifted to Europe for its second European swing, where Lätt lost in a playoff in a windstorm at the European Championships (finishing 2nd). This was the first tournament in recent memory where Lätt lost a lead midway through the final round. She then tied for second place at the PCS Open and finished fifth at the Krokhol Open. At the EDGF in Estonia, Lätt suddenly seemingly had a case of the "yips", where she totally lost confidence in her putting. She carded an uncharacteristic quadruple bogey in round one, then went on a tear over the next round and a half which saw her surge to a 5-stroke lead in front of her home crowd with 8 holes to play. Despite this, the pressure and the putting cost Lätt 7 strokes in those 8 holes, and she finished second. This marked a second straight large lead collapse midway through the final round of a tournament. Two weeks later at the World Championships in Nokia, Finland, Lätt was clearly struggling both physically and mentally – and after three mediocre rounds by her standards, she decided to withdraw from the event. Her withdrawal while tied for 16th place at Worlds marked the first time she had finished outside the top ten since June 2016 (other than one withdrawal due to injury where she was in the top ten at the time).

==== Hiatus ====
Lätt had announced via Instagram following her and her husband's trip to China to represent Estonia at the World Games, that her goal was to rest, relax, and heal and hopefully be back in the states for the Throw Pink Women's Disc Golf Championships and the DGPT Championship. Later in the fall season, Lätt reversed course. On her Instagram account she posted on September 14, that she would not be returning to the tour in 2025, and that she would not be touring in 2026, either. She left open other possibilities, including remaining active in the local community and organizing events. She also cited that her 2025 tour had been something she had been struggling with internally for some time. She termed it “[c]losing this chapter and stepping into the next…”

== Career Achievements ==
=== Major results timeline ===
Tournament	2017	2018	2019	2020	2021	2022	2023	2024	2025
European Open	6		5				1	1	2 (Note: With the World Championships in 2025 being held at the typical site of the European Open, The European Disc Golf Festival took the place of Europe's Major this year)
US Women's Disc Golf Championships	7	4	1				1	6	6
PDGA World Championships		8	6		5	1	1	3	DNF
Other majors	–	4		–		2	1	5	2

Win
Top 3 finish
Top 10 finish
Did not participate
Did not finish
Tournament not held

=== Kristin Lätt records ===
Event	Since	Record accomplished	Players matched
All-time Records	2023	Calendar Year Major Grand Slam (4 Major wins)	Stands alone
All-time Records	July 2021 to March 2023	Consecutive Elite/Major Podium Finishes (19)	Stands alone
All-time Records	July 2016 to July 2025	Overall Consecutive A-tier/Elite/Major Top Ten Finishes (111 (Note: This does not include a July 2022 injury withdrawal from the Latitude 64 Tyyni Open while tied for 3rd place.))	Stands alone
All-time Records	March 2019 to July 2025	Touring Pro Consecutive A-tier/Elite/Major Top Ten Finishes (91 (Note: Also does not include a July 2022 injury withdrawal from the Latitude 64 Tyyni Open while tied for 3rd place.))	Stands alone
FPO Records	Sept 2023	All-time highest rating (999, first achieved)	Stands alone
FPO Records	May 2024	First woman to 1000-rating (1000)	Stands alone
FPO Records	Nov 2024 to June 2025	Most consecutive updates 1000 or higher rating (4)	Stands alone
FPO Records	2022 Worlds through 2023 US Women's DGC	Consecutive Majors won (5)	tied with Juliana Korver, 1998 Worlds through-2001 Worlds
FPO Records	2023 Season	Highest total tournament singles earnings in a season ($116,247)	Stands alone

== Recognitions ==
In 2018, 2019, and 2021 the European Disc Golf Association chose her as the best female disc golfer of the year. In 2022 she was named the Disc Golf Pro Tour's Female Player of the Year, with a unanimous vote of the media, a feat she repeated in 2023. She won the PDGA's overall female player of the year in 2023 and in 2024.

== Sponsorship ==
Lätt has been a member of Team 64°, sponsored by Swedish disc golf equipment company Latitude 64° since she turned pro in 2014. She throws discs from Latitude 64, along with companion manufacturers Westside Discs and Dynamic Discs. She also has sponsorships from Nordic gaming company PAF, Nike (via Jalajälg), Porsche Estonia, Estonian health supplement brand Ecosh, international design agency Neway, 24/7 Fitness, and Air Baltic, among others.

== Personal ==
In August 2024, she announced on Instagram that she and her long-time partner, Silver Lätt, had married.
