= Flying disc at the 2013 World Games =

Flying disc at the 2013 World Games was composed of one sport, ultimate. The competition was held from July 28 to July 30 in Cali, Colombia. The six teams participating were Australia, Canada, Colombia, Great Britain, Japan and the United States which became the champion.

== Round robin ==
=== Standings ===
Team	Pld	W	L	GF	GA	GD	Pts
United States	5	5	0	64	41	+23	5
Australia	5	4	1	60	53	+7	4
Colombia	5	2	3	56	59	−3	2
Canada	5	2	3	54	58	−4	2
Japan	5	2	3	55	61	−6	2
Great Britain	5	0	5	48	65	−17	0

=== Matches ===
28 July 2013
8:30

Japan	13–12	Colombia

Pascual Guerrero, Cali
28 July 2013
10:00

Canada	13–9	Great Britain

Pascual Guerrero, Cali
28 July 2013
11:30

United States	13–8	Australia

Pascual Guerrero, Cali
28 July 2013
16:10

Colombia	13–12	Great Britain

Pascual Guerrero, Cali
28 July 2013
17:30

Japan	10–13	Australia

Pascual Guerrero, Cali
28 July 2013
19:10

United States	13–8	Canada

Pascual Guerrero, Cali

29 July 2013
8:30

Great Britain	11–13	Japan

Pascual Guerrero, Cali
29 July 2013
10:00

Colombia	7–13	United States

Pascual Guerrero, Cali
29 July 2013
11:30

Australia	13–10	Canada

Pascual Guerrero, Cali
29 July 2013
16:10

Japan	9–12	United States

Pascual Guerrero, Cali
29 July 2013
17:30

Canada	10–13	Colombia

Pascual Guerrero, Cali
29 July 2013
19:10

Australia	13–9	Great Britain

Pascual Guerrero, Cali

30 July 2013
8:30

Canada	13–10	Japan

Pascual Guerrero, Cali
30 July 2013
10:00

Australia	13–11	Colombia

Pascual Guerrero, Cali
30 July 2013
11:30

Great Britain	9–13	United States

Pascual Guerrero, Cali

== Third place match ==
30 July 2013
16:00

Colombia	11–12	Canada

Pascual Guerrero, Cali

== Championship final ==
30 July 2013
18:00

United States	13–6	Australia

Pascual Guerrero, Cali
