= Valarie Jenkins =

American disc golfer

Personal information
- Full name: Valarie Jenkins
- Nationality: United States
- Born: Hinckley, Ohio
- Spouse: Nate Doss

Sport
- Sport: Disc golf

Valarie Jenkins is a professional disc golfer currently living in Bend, Oregon. As of 2016, she was the third ranked female disc golfer in the world. She was around the sport from an early age and grew up in a disc golf family. Her mother, Sharon is a three-time Women's Masters World Champion and her brother, Avery Jenkins is a former Men's World Champion. She began her professional career in 2003 after placing second in the PDGA Amateur World Championship. She is currently sponsored by Discraft.

Jenkins has won 16 majors during the course of her career, including four World Championships, fourth most all time (Elaine King, Juliana Korver and Paige Pierce each have won 5).

== World championship era (2007–2009) ==
During the three years that Jenkins was the world champion, she completely dominated her sport. Over the course of these three years, she won 22 tournaments that were National Tour events or Majors. Out of the 93 events she played, she won 46. Jenkins remains one of only four women in the history of Disc Golf to have won at least 4 PDGA Professional World Championships.

== 2012 season ==
Jenkins started the 2012 season very well. She started the year by winning the A-Tier Gentlemen's Club Challenge by 7 strokes, followed by her first National Tour win of the year at the Memorial Championship.

== Notable wins ==
=== Major Championships (16) ===
Date	Tournament	Location	Earnings	Results Page
June 15, 2006	Japan Open	Tochigi, Nasu Highlands, Japan	$2,222	Results Page
August 1, 2007	PDGA World Championships	Highbridge, WI	$1,800	Results Page
June 12, 2008	Japan Open	Tochigi, Nasu Highlands, Japan	$3,095	Results Page
July 17, 2008	Scandinavian Open	Skellefteå, Sweden	$833	Results Page
August 11, 2008	PDGA World Championships	Kalamazoo, MI	$1,650	Results Page
November 21, 2008	The Players Cup	Crystal River, FL	$1,200	Results Page
July 27, 2009	PDGA World Championships	Kansas City, MO	$1,600	Results Page
August 27, 2009	European Open	Tampere, Finland	$933	Results Page
June 10, 2010	Japan Open	Tochigi, Nasu Highlands, Japan	$3,270	Results Page
September 24, 2010	US Women's Disc Golf Championship	Jacksonville, NC	$1,500	Results Page
July 21, 2011	European Open	Nokia, Finland	$1,190	Results Page
September 16, 2011	US Women's Disc Golf Championship	Round Rock, TX	$1,600	Results Page
September 23, 2011	PDGA Championship	International Disc Golf Center, GA	$1,100	Results Page
June 5, 2014	Japan Open	Nasu Shiobara, Tochigi, Japan	$2,940	Results Page
January 29, 2015	Aussie Open	Mundaring, Australia	$972	Results Page
August 6, 2016	PDGA World Championships	Emporia, Kansas	$5,000	Results Page

=== National Tour (29) ===
Date	Tournament	Location	Earnings	Results Page
May 4, 2007	Golden State Classic	La Mirada, CA	$570	Results Page
May 25, 2007	Beaver State Fling	Portland, OR	$655	Results Page
June 27, 2007	Kansas City Wide Open	Kansas City, MO	$580	Results Page
March 6, 2008	The Memorial	Scottsdale, AZ	$800	Results Page
April 12, 2008	Bowling Green Open	Bowling Green, KY	$850	Results Page
May 2, 2008	Steady Ed Memorial Masters Cup	Santa Cruz, CA	$790	Results Page
May 30, 2008	Minnesota Majestic	Twin Cities, MN	$900	Results Page
June 20, 2008	Golden State Classic	La Mirada, CA	$625	Results Page
July 25, 2008	The Vibram Open	Leicester, MA	$1,500	Results Page
March 5, 2009	The Memorial	Scottsdale, AZ	$600	Results Page
March 28, 2009	Atlanta Open	Cummings, GA	$500	Results Page
April 25, 2009	Green Country Open	Pawhuska, OK	$595	Results Page
May 15, 2009	Steady Ed Memorial	Santa Cruz, CA	$945	Results Page
June 19, 2009	Minnesota Majestic	Twin Cities, MN	$800	Results Page
July 17, 2009	First Class Challenge	Des Moines, IA	$695	Results Page
March 26, 2010	Sunshine State Open	Ocala, FL	$625	Results Page
April 23, 2010	Carolina Clash	Charlotte, NC	$700	Results Page
June 25, 2010	Minnesota Majestic	Twin Cities	$600	Results Page
July 10, 2010	Brent Hambrick Memorial Open	Columbus, OH	$625	Results Page
August 27, 2010	Skylands Classic	Palmerton, PA	$675	Results Page
April 2, 2011	Texas State Championships	Hitchcock, TX	$650	Results Page
May 13, 2011	Alabama Disc Golf Championship	Athens, AL	$600	Results Page
June 4, 2011	Brent Hambrick Memorial Open	Columbus, OH	$600	Results Page
June 24, 2011	Beaver State Fling	Estacada, OR	$1,545	Results Page
February 29, 2012	Memorial Open	Scottsdale, AZ	$1,300	Results Page
June 1, 2012	Kansas City Wide Open	Kansas City, MO	$1,070	Results Page
August 22, 2013	Vibram Open	Leicester, MA	$1,500	Results Page
August 1, 2014	Fort Steilacoom Open	Steilacoom, WA	$800	Results Page
August 30, 2014	Brent Hambrick Memorial Open	Columbus, OH	$580	Results Page

=== Summary ===
Competition Tier	Wins	2nd	3rd	Top-5	Events
World Championships	4	3	2	11	14
Other Majors	12	10	6	31	32
National Tour	29	23	22	86	92

== Annual statistics ==
Year	Events	Wins	Top 3	Earnings	$ / Event	Rating^{†}	World Ranking^{†}
2001	1	0	0	$0	$0.00	795	-
2003	2	0	1	$0	$0.00	878	-
2004	13	0	8	$2,612	$200.92	912	-
2005	23	5	15	$3,781	$164.39	937	7
2006	18	6	16	$8,302	$461.22	950	5
2007	27	9	25	$10,276	$380.59	958	2
2008	22	17	21	$16,942	$770.09	961	1
2009	29	18	28	$15,706	$541.59	964	1
2010	21	12	20	$14,533	$692.05	961	1
2011	22	13	20	$13,558	$616.27	968	1
2012	21	8	19	$12,713	$605.38	976	1
2013	17	7	16	$13,706	$806.24	968	1
2014	18	7	17	$12,424	$690.22	962	3
2015	18	4	14	$14,924	$829.11	961	4
2016	13	3	10	$12,000	$923.08	954	-
Career	265	109	230	$151,477	$571.61	-	-

- The above information was gathered from Jenkins's PDGA player page.

^{†}At Year End

== Sponsorship and equipment ==
Jenkins is currently sponsored by Discraft.
