= History of disc golf =

Modern disc golf started in the early 1960s, but there is debate over who came up with the idea first. The consensus is that multiple groups of people played independently throughout the 1960s. Students at Rice University in Houston, Texas, for example, held tournaments with trees as targets as early as 1964, and in the early 1960s, players in Pendleton King Park in Augusta, Georgia would toss Frisbees into 50-gallon barrel trash cans designated as targets. In 1968 Frisbee Golf was also played in Alameda Park in Santa Barbara, California by teenagers in the Anacapa and Sola street areas. Gazebos, water fountains, lamp posts, and trees were all part of the course. This took place for several years and an Alameda Park collectors edition disc still exists, though rare, as few were made. Clifford Towne from this group went on to hold a National Time Aloft record.

== Early pioneers of the sport ==
Two early coordinators of the sport are George Sappenfield and Kevin Donnelly, who, through similar backgrounds and the help of Frisbee inventor Ed Headrick at Wham-O, were able to individually spread the sport in their California cities. Donnelly began playing a form of Frisbee golf in 1959 called Street Frisbee Golf. In 1961, while a recreation leader and then recreation supervisor for the City of Newport Beach, California, he formulated and then began organizing Frisbee golf tournaments at nine of the city's playgrounds he supervised. This culminated in 1965 with a fully documented, Wham-O sponsored, citywide Frisbee golf tournament spearheaded by Headrick at Wham-O. This highly publicized tournament included hula hoops as holes, with published rules, hole lengths, pars, and prizes; an event in which Walter Frederick Morrison, inventor of the Pluto Platter, was in attendance. In 1965, Sappenfield was a recreation counselor during a summer break from college during which, he set up an object course for his children to play on. When he finished college in 1968, Sappenfield became the Parks and Recreation supervisor for Conejo Recreation and Park District in Thousand Oaks, California. Sappenfield planned a disc golf tournament as part of a recreation project and contacted Wham-O Manufacturing to ask them for help with the event. Wham-O supplied Frisbees for throwing, and hula hoops for use as targets.

Before 1973 and the invention of the disc golf target called the disc pole hole, there were only a few disc golf object courses in the U.S. and Canada. Despite having never heard of the International Frisbee Association (IFA) that Ed Headrick and Wham-O had put together, or ever seeing a copy of the IFA Newsletter, Jim Palmeri, his brother, and a small group of people from Rochester, New York, had been playing disc golf as a competitive sport on a regular basis since August 1970, including tournaments and weekly league play. By 1973, they had even promoted two City of Rochester Disc Frisbee Championship events which featured disc golf as the main event. In Canada, beginning in 1970, Ken Westerfield and Jim Kenner played Frisbee golf daily on an 18 object hole course they designed at Queen's Park in downtown Toronto and presented Canada's first disc golf competitions. In California, the Berkeley Frisbee Group established a standardized 18 hole object course on the Berkeley campus in 1970. University of Michigan Nichols Arboretum, Ann Arbor had an object Frisbee golf course designed in the early 1970s. As mentioned above, Ed Headrick designed the disc pole hole in 1976 and it was first featured in the World Frisbee Championships later that year at two Los Angeles parks, Oak Grove and La Mirada. This seminal event was won by John 'Friz Whiz' Kirkland. Wham-O's $50,000 Disc Golf Tournament was significant turning point for disc golf. Held in Huntington Beach, California. The tournament was groundbreaking, first and foremost because of the cash involved, its massive payout right in the title, but also because the competitors had to qualify for an invitation. 72 qualifying events were established around the country, bringing in the best disc golfers from across the United States.

== Creation of the modern game ==
"Steady Ed" Headrick and Dave Dunipace are two inventors and players who greatly impacted how disc golf is played. In 1976 Headrick formalized the rules of the sport, founded the Disc Golf Association (DGA), the Professional Disc Golf Association (PDGA), the Recreational Disc Golf Association (RDGA) and invented the first formal disc golf target with chains and a basket. Dunipace invented the modern golf disc in 1983 with the revolutionary change of adding a beveled rim, allowing a disc to travel a greater distance while maintaining control and accuracy. Dave is one of the founders of Innova, a well-known disc manufacturer. In 1982, Ed Headrick turned over control of the PDGA to the players and Ted Smethers to be run independently and to officiate the standard rules of play for the sport.

"Steady Ed" Headrick began thinking about the sport during his time at Wham-O Toys where he designed and patented the modern day Frisbee. Headrick designed and installed the first standardized target course in what was then known as Oak Grove Park in La Cañada Flintridge, California. (Today the park is known as Hahamongna Watershed Park). Ed worked for the San Gabriel, California-based Wham-O Corporation and is credited for pioneering the modern era of disc sports. Ed Founded "The International Frisbee Association (IFA)" and began establishing competitive standards for various sports using the Frisbee such as Distance, MTA, TRC, Accuracy, Freestyle, and Guts.

Headrick coined and trademarked the term "Disc Golf" when formalizing the sport and patented the Disc Pole Hole, the first disc golf target to incorporate chains and a basket on a pole. He started designing the target because he was tired of arguing over what counted as a scoring disc with his friends. He founded the Professional Disc Golf Association (PDGA) and Recreational Disc Golf Association (RDGA) for competitive and family-oriented play, respectively, and worked on standardizing the rules and the equipment for the growing sport. Headrick abandoned his trademark on the term "Disc Golf", and turned over control and administration of the PDGA to the growing body of disc golf players in order to focus on his passion for building and inventing equipment for the sport.

== See also ==
- Impact of the COVID-19 pandemic on disc golf
- International Disc Golf Center
