= Impact of the COVID-19 pandemic on disc golf =

Global impact of COVID-19 on disc golf

The COVID-19 pandemic has caused disruption to disc golf across the world, mirroring its impact across all sports. Throughout the world and to varying degrees, leagues and competitions have been cancelled or postponed.

Some public disc golf courses saw their baskets pulled out temporarily, as part of national, regional, and municipal containment measures such as quarantines and curfews (variously known as stay-at-home orders, shelter-in-place orders, or lockdowns). Nevertheless, as the pandemic progressed, most courses reopened, and some baseball parks set up a makeshift disc golf course to promote the sport, following the cancellation of professional baseball events across the United States.

During the pandemic, there was an increased interest in the sport, partly because many disc golf courses remained open – unlike most sports facilities – and partly because disc golf is largely a socially distant sport.

== Timeline ==
=== March 2020 ===
On 6 March, five days before the World Health Organization classified the spread of COVID-19 as a pandemic, the Professional Disc Golf Association (PDGA) issued its first statement about the COVID-19 outbreak to announce that it was "evaluating its potential impact on [its] membership across 43 countries on six continents, as well as disc golfers everywhere" and encouraged tournament directors to follow the directives of local authorities when making decisions related to their events.

On 11 March 2020, The College Disc Golf National Championship, a PDGA Major competition set to take place from 1–4 April at Winthrop University in Rock Hill, South Carolina, was one of the first major disc golf events to be postponed indefinitely.

On 13 March, the PDGA announced that PDGA-sanctioned tournaments will still be allowed in areas where they have not been banned.

On 18 March 2020 the International Disc Golf Center, serving as the PDGA headquarters, was closed to both staff and visitors until 6 April 2020, together with its three adjacent disc golf courses and pro shop. The next day, the PDGA amended temporarily section 1.03 "Withdrawals and Refunds" of the PDGA Competition Manual for Disc Golf Events to guarantee fair cancellations for both organizers and participants.

On 19 March 2020, Release Point reached out to Robert Jonas, professor at Texas Lutheran University, and published an article endorsing the continuation of play:

playing a round solo or with cohabitants at a course that is not seeing high traffic levels would be both relatively safe and ethical.

The article also answered safety questions and made sanitation recommendations for disc golfers who, in light of the pandemic, found themselves with more free time than usual for playing disc golf.

The following day, disc golf think tank Parked tackled the issue of baskets, which were thought to be a transmission vector for the virus, based on a new study published in The New England Journal of Medicine about the virus's decay rate on various surfaces, such as metal baskets and plastic discs.

On 23 March 2020, the PDGA asked its members and the entire disc golf community to avoid going to disc golf courses. The next day, the association launched a social media campaign asking its members to "Skip The Course. Stay Home." It also encouraged the disc golf community to share pictures and videos of homemade baskets and practice throws online using the "#discgolffromhome" hashtag. Prominent professional disc golfers including Simon Lizotte also participated.

=== April 2020 ===
By 16 April 2020, the PDGA had temporarily furloughed more than half of its staff members and contract support in response to the pandemic. The remaining staff worked remotely and prioritized COVID-19 coordination efforts.

On 17 April 2020, the PDGA suspended event sanctioning through 31 May. All PDGA Major and PDGA National Tour events originally scheduled through July 31, 2020 were postponed.

=== May 2020 ===
On 6 May 2020, the PDGA reverted its stance on staying home altogether. Board of Directors president Justin Menickelli posted a "Letter on Responsible Recreation" with guidelines for "returning to the course for casual play," since sanctioned events were still postponed until 31 May. In his letter, he stressed the importance of following recommendations from local health authorities, and reminded players to adhere to common sense measures to prevent the spread of the virus.

5 Steps to Reinstate Event Sanctioning

1. A government authority must issue directives that allow organized, competitive sporting events to resume.
2. PDGA verifies government directives in cooperation with member-elected State and Provincial Coordinators and appointed Country Coordinators.
3. Upon verification, sanctioning becomes available in that geographic area.
4. PDGA will notify event directors in that geographic area, who must agree to government directives and PDGA Requirements for Competition During COVID-19.
5. Sanctioning is reinstated for individual events.

— PDGA, www.pdga.com/announcements/letsbringitback

On 14 May, the PDGA announced that it would begin phasing in event sanctioning on a regional basis using a five-step process. As a result, all events scheduled after 14 May 2020 were placed into reserved status with sanctioning pending, and would later be allowed to run "as soon as local directives permit organized, competitive sporting events to resume". The same day, Arkansas, Iceland, and Norway were the first regions to resume tournament sanctioning.

=== June 2020 ===
Several news outlets reported that disc golf was gaining traction as a form of outdoor recreation compatible with social distancing mandates during the COVID-19 pandemic.

== COVID-19 courses and events ==
With the cancellation of baseball events across the United States, several baseball parks set up a makeshift disc golf course and organized disc golf events during the pandemic. Notable ones include the 9-hole Bubba Watson's Diamond Disc Golf Challenge at the Admiral Fetterman Field in Pensacola, Florida, the 12-hole course at the Charlotte Knights' Truist Field stadium, and the 9-hole Diamond Disc Golf presented by Woodfin event at The Diamond stadium in Richmond, Virginia, home of the Richmond Flying Squirrels.

== By country ==
=== Australia ===
The 2020 Australian Disc Golf Championships were cancelled as a result of COVID-19. On 18 March 2020, Australian Disc Golf suspended all ADG-sanctioned events, including all A, B, C and X tier tournaments and league, until 18 May 2020.

=== Canada ===
Alberta. All PDGA-sanctioned events in Alberta were suspended until an undetermined date, and most were eventually cancelled. The city of Calgary closed all disc golf courses on 27 April, but reopened them the following week, on 2 May, on condition that players maintain 6 feet of personal distancing, play in small groups of less than five people, and have no contact with other players' discs. The Calgary Disc Golf Club strongly supported the PDGA's recommendation to "skip the course, and stay home," and warned its members that the "City may choose to take the privilege [of playing disc golf] away [...] if it is abused." When the city's disc golf courses were closed, over 60 volunteers from local the disc golf community cleaned up trash on the courses. On 30 May, Dylan Bressey, treasurer for the Grande Prairie Disc Golf Club, noted that disc golf popularity was on the rise during the COVID-19 pandemic on Grande Prairie's courses, and he encouraged people to play while practicing safe social distancing.

Quebec. On 14 April 2020, the Série Disque Golf Québec posted a bilingual notice on their Facebook page requesting that all disc golfers abide by provincial regulations, as they could get fined, and cities could pull out the baskets. On 23 April 2020, the Association Disc Golf Montréal (ADGM) reminded its members to follow federal, provincial, and municipal directives, after receiving a warning from the city of Longueuil about players at the Parcours Île Charron disc golf course.

=== Finland ===
On 13 March 2020, the Finnish Disc Golf Association (FDGA, Finnish: Suomen frisbeegolfliitto) announced that all PDGA-sanctioned events in Finland would be cancelled or postponed through 5 April 2020.

=== Poland ===
On 20 March 2020, in light of a national lockdown, the Liga Latających Talerzy postponed its regular meetings and competitions, and considered organizing remote tournaments, whereby players would play individually and trust other players to keep track of their own score. With the loosening of COVID-19 restrictions, events resumed on 24 May 2020. On 21 May 2020, Disc Golf Poland posted a notice deploring the state of the COVID-19 situation and how the government's response impacted disc golf in Poland.

=== Sweden ===
The virus was confirmed to have reached Sweden on 31 January 2020, when a woman returning from Wuhan tested positive. The first death was reported on 11 March in Stockholm. Unlike many other countries, Sweden did not impose a generalized lockdown. Nevertheless, the Public Health Agency of Sweden (Swedish: Folkhälsomyndigheten), the government agency responsible for managing the pandemic, issued several bans, as the crisis evolved.

On 27 March 2020, the Swedish government announced a ban on public gatherings and public events (such as sports competitions) with more than 50 participants. On 29 May 2020, the Swedish Disc Golf Association (Swedish: Svenska Discgolfförbundet) made official recommendations based on directives by the Swedish Sports Confederation (Swedish: Riksidrottsförbundet, RF) and the Swedish Police Authority (Swedish: Polismyndigheten).

=== Switzerland ===
On 16 April 2020, the Federal Council announced that businesses referred to in article 6, al. 3, of Order 2 COVID-19 would be authorized to reopen starting 27 April 2020, provided that they draft a COVID-19 protection plan (in Swiss Standard German: Schutzkonzept, French: Plan de protection). On 26 April 2020, the Swiss Disc Golf Association published the German-language version of its COVID-19 protection plan, and a French-language translation by Disc Golf Genève President Yannick Fernandez and Vice-president Emile Barbe followed suit a week later.

On 29 May 2020, the Swiss Federal Office of Sport, the Federal Office of Public Health, and the Swiss Olympic Association published updated graphics in German and French with new directives for resuming competitions in Switzerland, effective 6 June 2020. Per the new directives, sporting events were capped to 300 people, attendance lists were required for facilitating contact tracing, players were required to keep 2 metres (6.6 ft) of social distancing when possible, and sick players were banned from training and competitions.

=== United States ===
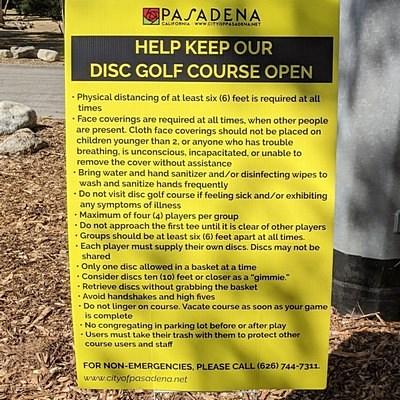
A warning sign form the City of Pasadena, California that was posted at the Oak Grove Park disc golf course

The Junior Disc Golf Association (J.D.G.A) amended its rulebook by adding Section 7.1, which includes rules pertaining to COVID-19 safety. Per the new rules, all matches and events will take place outdoors, high fives and disc sharing are forbidden, and cards will be limited to 5 people, with officials ideally aiming for 3 people. Players with a fever above 99 °F (37 °C) are forbidden from play, and parents must report to a J.D.G.A official if a player is diagnosed with COVID-19.

Arkansas. On 18 March 2020, the US Army Corps of Engineers announced that disc golf courses, fishing areas, mountain bike and hiking trails would remain open on all Little Rock District locations.

California. On 16 March 2020, Tournament Director Matt Beatty announced the cancellation of the Santa Cruz Masters Cup Presented by Innova, a National Tour Elite Series event planned for 15–17 May 2020. On 27 May 2020, the city of Santa Clarita announced the creation of a virtual disc golf league beginning 5 July 2020, and asked interested players to play two preliminary rounds at the Central Park Disc Golf Course before submitting scores over the month of June, in order to form optimal groups. On 16 December 2020, the County of Santa Cruz issued a regional Stay-at-home order that prohibited leisure travel, but allowed "travel outside home for essential purposes, including exercise." However, the city of Santa Cruz did not close the DeLaveaga Disc Golf Course.

Florida. On 13 March 2020, Florida retailer Disc Golf Center limited the number of people inside its retail to less than 10 (including employees), and closed the store completely on 1 April 2020, while encouraging customers to place orders online for store pick-up. In April 2020, disc golf courses in Orlando remained open as essential businesses.

Hawaii. On 28 September 2020, Hawaii County Mayor Harry Kim signed COVID- 19 Emergency Rule No. 12, in which disc golf, together with 12 other "non-contact sports programs" were permitted to continue operating as long as the combined maximum number of participants and non-participants did not exceed 50 people, and no less than 20 ft (6.1 m) of separation had to be maintained at all times between people during both training and competitions; mingling between members of separate "non-contact sports programs" was disallowed.

Maine. The state of Maine is notable for mentioning disc golf courses explicitly in its COVID-19 Prevention Checklists published by the Maine Department of Economic and Community Development. The first checklist pertaining specifically to golf and disc golf was released on 29 April 2020. It was amended three times thereafter: on 8 May, 20 May, and 27 May.

Massachusetts. On 7 April 2020, the US Army Corps of Engineers announced that the Barre Falls Dam and its disc golf course were closed until further notice.

New York. In November 2020, local disc golf enthusiasts from The Twin Tiers Disc Golf Club established the Gargoyle Park Public Disc Golf Course Fund at the Cattaraugus Region Community Foundation with the goal of introducing "free, social-distance-friendly, year-round recreation in the form of a disc golf course at Gargoyle Park," which would make it the first public disc golf course in the city of Olean and in Cattaraugus County.

Pennsylvania. On 20 March 2020, the US Army Corps of Engineers announced that all 15 facilities in its Pittsburgh district, including the Woodcock Lake Park Disc Golf Course, were closed until further notice.

South Carolina. South Carolina issued a limit of 250 people for large gatherings. In August 2020, Chad Sullivan, the president of the Myrtle Beach Disc Golf Club, reported that 25 new members joined the club during the pandemic explicitly to "jump out and play because they didn't have anything else to do" in light of the containment measures.

Tennessee. On 16 March 2020, the Music City Disc Golf Club announced that the city of Nashville had no plans of closing any of its parks in light of the pandemic. The club later posted a 2-page Social Distancing Guide prominently on its website. Social distancing protocols remained in effect at all remaining events in 2020. The city of Morristown kept its three disc golf courses open during the pandemic. On 5–7 June 2020, the annual Tennessee State Disc Golf Championships were held as planned, albeit with standard COVID-19 social distancing considerations. In spite of the pandemic, the Open division saw an increase in participation compared to the previous year, with 84 participants – 33 more than the previous year.

Texas. Disc golf courses in Odessa were closed briefly in the early stage of the pandemic. On 7 April 2020, baskets were pulled out from the T.C. Jester Park disc golf course, in Houston. On 21 May 2020, two days after Texas Governor Greg Abbott issued Executive Order No. GA-23 "relating to the expanded opening of Texas in response to the COVID-19 disaster", Houston Mayor Sylvester Turner announced that on 1 June, the city would reopen the 5 city-owned disc golf courses that had their baskets pulled out (Agnes Moffitt Park, MacGregor Park, Mason Park, Milby Park, and T.C. Jester Park).

Vermont. On 22 May 2020, with the easing of restrictions by the State of Vermont, Smugglers' Notch Disc Golf Center reopened its doors for business to groups of 4 people or less. In accordance with Vermont Agency of Commerce and Community Development (ACCD) and State of Vermont recommendations, operating procedures were updated to limit the number of guests allowed in the shop at one time to 8, scheduling tee times 12 minutes apart, and enforcing typical social distancing and sanitation protocols.

== Events ==
On 13 March, the 2020 Dynamic Discs Glass Blown Open (GBO) was officially cancelled. The organizers later announced that the event would unfold from 28 April to 2 May per the initial schedule, but as a virtual event instead.

On 20 May 2020, a week after four out of six PDGA National Tour events were postponed or cancelled, the PDGA announced that the last two events of tour will be cancelled (the 2020 Delaware Disc Golf Challenge and the 2020 Music City Open). The Tour itself was delayed until 2021 amid uncertainty regarding sanctioning and minimal staff. Four of the PDGA Euro Tour's tournaments were cancelled, and one was postponed. The Disc Golf Pro Tour resumed after a hiatus on 13 March.

The United States Disc Golf Championship (USDGC) unfolded on 7–10 October 2020 as scheduled originally, but no spectators were allowed on site, and smaller events were suspended: Opening and Closing ceremonies, Big Arm Big Heart Distance Showcase, EDGE (Education Disc Golf Experience) Learning Village, Competitor and Fan Hospitality Areas, and Tournament Pro Shop On-Site. The 2020 Throw Pink Women's Event was rescheduled for 11 October, and it included precautionary measures including COVID-19 screening at the entrance, limiting the size of clinic groups to 4 people, and requiring facemasks except when actively throwing.

=== List of impacted events ===
Event	Location	Original schedule	Announcement	New schedule
2020 Texas State Disc Golf Championships	Tyler, Texas	26–29 March	13 March	Cancelled
2020 College Disc Golf National Championship (CDGNC)	Rock Hill, South Carolina	1–4 April	11 March, 1 November	Cancelled
2020 Spring Forester	Varaždin, Croatia	10–12 April	13 March	Cancelled
2020 Jonesboro Open	Jonesboro, Arkansas	17–19 April	Mid-March	1-3 October
2020 Dynamic Discs Glass Blown Open (GBO)	Emporia, Kansas	28 April–2 May	13 March, 17 March	28 April-2 May (virtual)
2020 Australian Disc Golf Championships	(Victoria (state)) Inverleigh, Victoria	-	14 June	Cancelled
2020 Santa Cruz Masters Cup presented by Innova Disc Golf	Santa Cruz, California	15–17 May	16 March	Cancelled
2020 PDGA United States Amateur Disc Golf Championships (USADGC)	Milford, Michigan	5–7 June	17 March	Cancelled
2020 PDGA Professional Disc Golf World Championships	Ogden, Utah	13–20 June	17 March	Cancelled
2020 Beaver State Fling	Estacada, Oregon	26–28 June	17 March	Cancelled
2020 PDGA Junior Disc Golf World Championships	Emporia, Kansas	8–11 July	17 March	Cancelled
2020 European Open	Nokia, Finland	16–19 July	17 March	To be announced
2020 PDGA Amateur Disc Golf World Championships	Orlando, Florida	25 July–1 August	17 March	Cancelled
2020 PDGA Professional Masters Disc Golf World Championships	Johnson City, Tennessee	22-29 August	20 May	Cancelled
2020 United States Disc Golf Championship (USDGC)	Rock Hill, South Carolina	7–10 October	18 September	Original schedule; scaled-down; no on-site spectators
