= Masters Cup (disc golf) =

The Masters Cup is an annual disc golf tournament held at DeLaveaga Disc Golf Course in Santa Cruz, California. The event features both amateur and professional divisions. The 23rd annual Masters Cup was held April 18–20 (amateur) and May 2–4 (professional), 2008.

The Masters Cup is as important to the Professional Disc Golf Association (PDGA) tour as the Masters Tournament is to the PGA, though far less well known to the general public. Each year, one player is selected to receive the "Steady" Ed Memorial Trophy, a lifetime achievement award dedicated to the spirit of disc golf immortal "Steady" Ed Headrick. The 2008 winner of the memorial trophy was Marty Hapner , 2004 inductee to the PDGA hall of fame and longtime supporter of DeLaveaga disc golf club, the PDGA, and disc golf in general.

Previous memorial trophy recipients have included Ken Climo and Tom Schot.

In 2017, Paul McBeth won his fifth Masters Cup title in six years.
