= Miers Fisher =

American politician

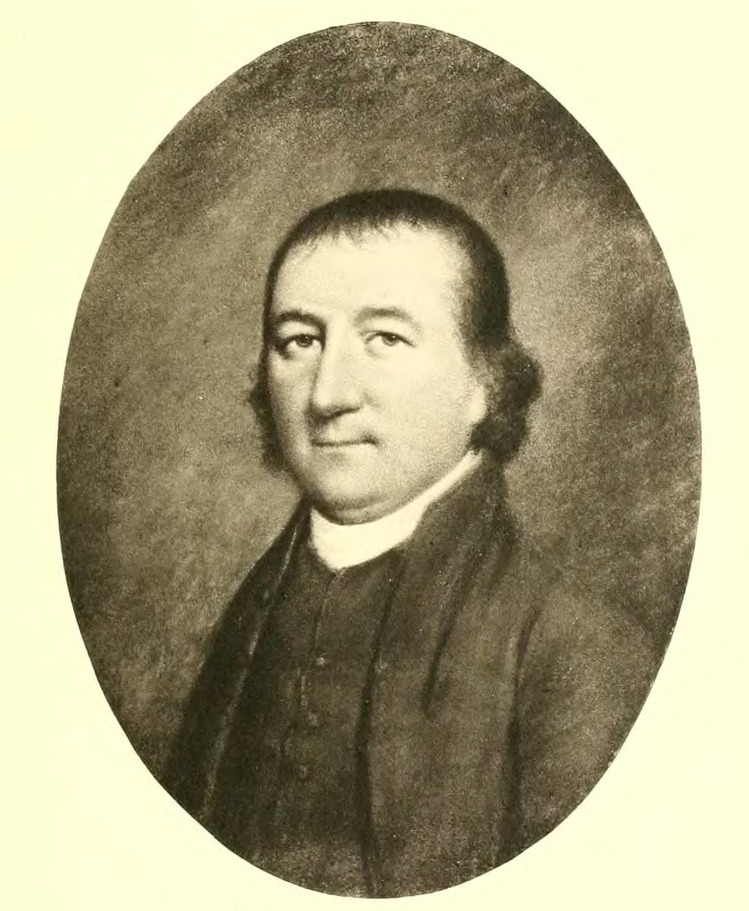

Member of the Pennsylvania House of Representatives from the Philadelphia district
- In office 1791–1792

Personal details
- Born: Miers Fisher; June 21, 1748 Philadelphia, Pennsylvania
- Died: March 12, 1819 (aged 70) Philadelphia, Pennsylvania
- Party: Federalist Party
- Occupation: Lawyer, merchant

Miers Fisher (June 21, 1748 – March 12, 1819) was a lawyer, legislator, philanthropist, and merchant from Philadelphia, Pennsylvania. He was imprisoned and exiled during the Revolutionary War because of his Quaker beliefs, and after the war served in the Pennsylvania House of Representatives.

== Family ==
Miers was born in Philadelphia, the third son of Joshua Fisher, the Quaker merchant and mapmaker. He grew up in Philadelphia (110 S. Front St.) and his family had a country home on the Schuylkill River called "The Cliffs", which is now the site of Sedgley Woods in Fairmount Park, Philadelphia.

Miers married Sarah Redwood on February 17, 1774, daughter of William Redwood and Hannah Holmes. They had 16 children, of which five lived past the age of 30. In 1808, their son Miers Fisher Jr. (1786–1813), a traveler, was witness to early uprisings in the so-called Peninsular War in Spain, and to Napoleon's invasion of Russia in 1812.

In 1795, Fisher purchased an estate near Fox Chase in Philadelphia County, which he called "Ury".

== Education and early life ==
Fisher studied law with Benjamin Chew, who later became Chief Justice of the Supreme Court of Pennsylvania. He was admitted to the Bar in New Castle, Kent, and Sussex counties (now Delaware Bar) in February 1769. He began practicing law in Philadelphia in June 1770.

John Adams, who would later become President of the United States, wrote the following description of Fisher in his journal: "September 7th, 1774. Dined with Miers Fisher, a young Quaker and a lawyer. We saw his library, which is clever. But this plain Friend, and his plain, though pretty wife, with her thees and her thous, had provided us the most costly entertainment."

== Revolutionary War ==
During the American Revolutionary War, Fisher and his brothers were exiled in Winchester, Virginia, in 1777, after refusing to swear an oath of allegiance and deliver their mercantile firm's business records to the authorities. They were under house arrest for one year and two of their company, Thomas Gilpin and John Hunt, died in exile. They were eventually pardoned by George Washington and allowed to return to Philadelphia after the British evacuated.

== Mercantile business ==
Fisher grew up immersed in his father's mercantile business, "Joshua Fisher & Sons" (1762–1783). He learned about all aspects of the family business. The firm imported an extensive variety of goods from Europe including porcelain, silverware, and high quality craftsman tools like chisels and saws.

In 1787, Fisher advised and financed the establishment of the Gilpin family paper mill on the Brandywine River in Delaware. It was run by Joshua Gilpin and his brother Thomas Gilpin Jr., the sons of Fisher's late friend, Thomas Gilpin Sr., who died in exile during the Revolutionary War. The Gilpins became renowned for their fine paper, and the invention of the "endless paper making machine" in 1817 revolutionized the paper making industry.

Fisher was a director of the Bank of North America from 1792 to 1800, and an advocate of establishing lines of credit ("loan funds") for tradesmen, to spur economic growth.

== Political career ==
Fisher served in the "Common Council", now known as Philadelphia City Council, from 1789 to 1791. Fisher was the first counselor of the Pennsylvania Abolition Society.

He served in the Pennsylvania House of Representatives from 1791 to 1792, representing the City of Philadelphia as a member of the majority Federalist Party. During a debate in the House in January 1792, about whether to grant a request for "lottery privileges", Fisher remarked that "lotteries were like the Pope's indulgences, forgiving and permitting sins, to raise money." Fisher's remark was printed in Dunlap's American Daily Advertiser on January 6, 1792, which angered members of the Catholic community. Fisher expressed "a sensible regret that he should wound the feelings of any individual, much more of a whole Society for whose general character in this country he has very high respect".
