= Ed Headrick =

American toy inventor and inventor of Disc Golf

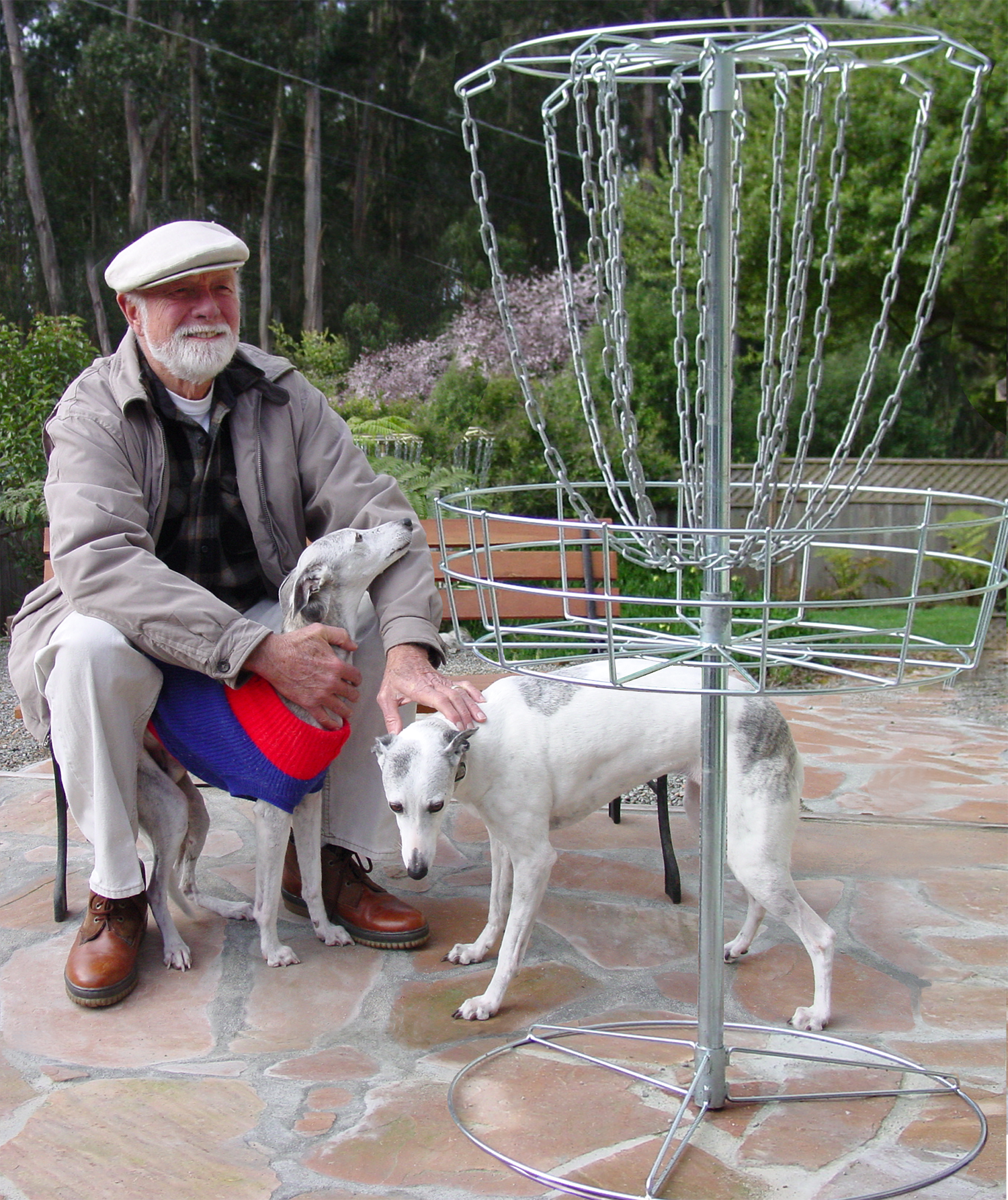
- Headrick with his two whippets and a lightweight all metal disc golf target in 2002
- Born: Edward Early Headrick; June 28, 1924; South Pasadena, California, U.S.
- Died: August 12, 2002 (aged 78); La Selva Beach, California, U.S.
- Occupations: Toy designer; Inventor
- Known for: Inventor of Disc golf, Founder of Disc Golf Association, and Founder of Professional Disc Golf Association
- Spouse: Farina Headrick
- Children: 4

Edward Early Headrick, known as "Steady" Ed Headrick (June 28, 1924 – August 12, 2002), was the father of the modern-day frisbee, creator of disc golf, and inventor of the metal cage disc golf targets. Per his request, his ashes were incorporated into discs, which were sold to fund a museum and disc golf center in Columbia County, Georgia.

== Early life and Wham-O career ==
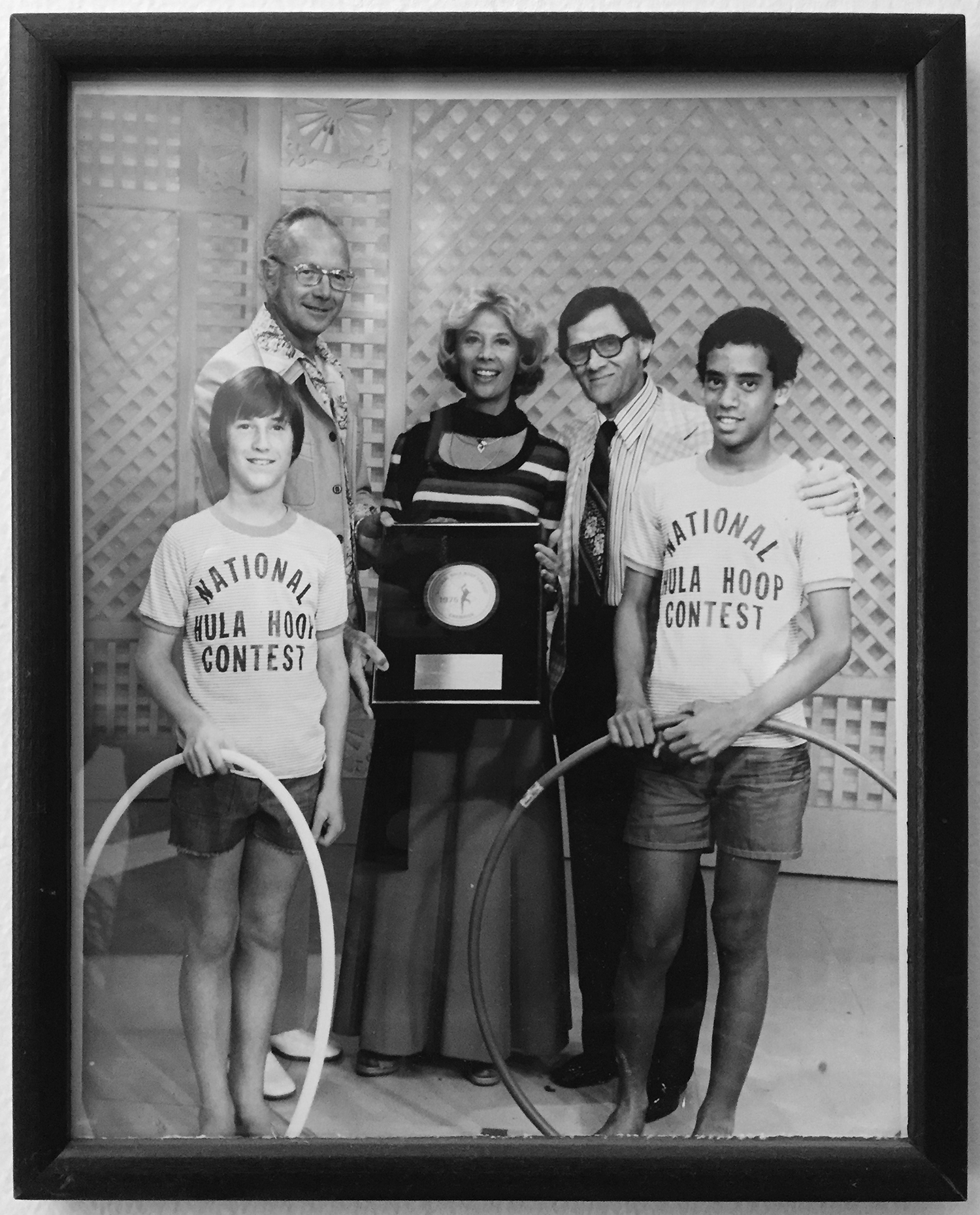
Ed Headrick promoting the Hula Hoop for Wham-O with celebrity Dinah Shore, two competitors and show host.

Headrick was born in South Pasadena, California on June 28, 1924. Before his career in the toy industry, he fought in the army in Europe during WWII and worked several jobs including deep-sea welder and water heater salesman. He was connected with Arthur Melin, who co-owned Wham-O, and in 1964 he worked three months without pay to prove his worth. He then led Wham-O's research and development where he evaluated new toy ideas such as the highly successful Super Ball, which he market-tested at a liquor store before release to ensure its appeal with adults.

He was tasked with repurposing excess plastic leftover from hula hoops, so he redesigned the "Pluto Putter" flying saucer, which Wham-O had bought in 1955 from inventor Walter Frederick Morrison. Headrick's version became the Frisbee disc that is still in use, and it was awarded U.S. Patent #3359678 on 26 December 1967. Headrick launched a promotional campaign focused on trick throws and Frisbee as a sport. He eventually was promoted to executive vice president of Wham-O. He founded the International Frisbee Association, which grew to over 85,000 members.

== Disc golf ==
Headrick got the idea for disc golf during lunch breaks at Wham-O, when he and colleagues threw Frisbees at a trash can. He developed object courses with his friends and son, challenging each other to hit trash cans, signs, and trees. They sometimes snuck onto golf courses at night to play rounds with discs. Headrick's target shooting skill with the Frisbee earned him the nickname "Steady Ed".

Wham-O did not share Ed's vision for the game and did not license the Frisbee trademark for Frisbee golf. In 1975, Headrick left Wham-O to focus on "disc golf," which he coined and trademarked. That year, he designed and installed the first disc golf course in Oak Grove Park in Pasadena. Employees at the nearby NASA Jet Propulsion Lab played during lunch and the game quickly spread across the nation.

=== Disc Golf Association ===
In 1976, "Steady" Ed Headrick and his son Ken founded the Disc Golf Association to manufacture discs and targets and formalize the game. Initially, the target consisted of a pole sticking out of the ground.

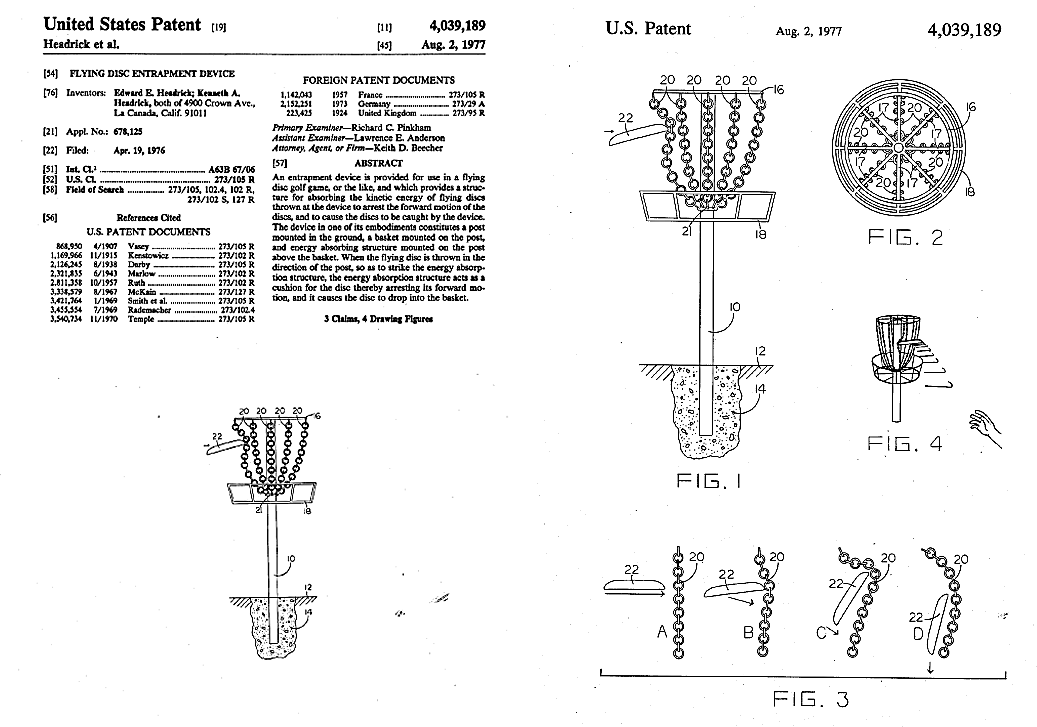
Ed Headrick's Flying Disc Entrapment Device Patent 4039189. The first disc golf target made with chains that became the standard for disc golf.

In 1977, Headrick and his son Ken developed the metal basket target that could catch a disc from all directions, which they trademarked "Disc Pole Hole" (US Patent 4,039,189). Headrick continued to revise and obtain patents for basket designs until his death in 2002. Today there are over 14,000 disc golf courses installed throughout the world, many with metal basket targets designed by Headrick.

=== Professional Disc Golf Association ===
In 1976, Headrick founded the Professional Disc Golf Association to manage standards for the sport and a dues-paying membership. With fellow disc golfers like Victor Malafronte, Headrick created the first rules and standards for disc golf, which were printed out in small binders. Headrick founded tournaments, including a $50,000 landmark Frisbee Disc Golf Tournament in 1979 and a world championships. He led the organization until 1982, when he turned over daily operation to an elected body of disc golf players. The Professional Disc Golf Association remains the overseeing body of disc golf, with an elected board and over 71,000 active dues-paying members.

In 2002, Headrick suffered two strokes while attending the Amateur World Championships in Miami. He was in good spirits and even signed Frisbees from his hospital bed before traveling on a medical flight to his home in La Selva Beach, California, where he died on August 12, 2002, surrounded by family and his friends. Headrick donated the disc golf trademark to the public domain. His widow, Farina Headrick, ran the Disc Golf Association after his death.

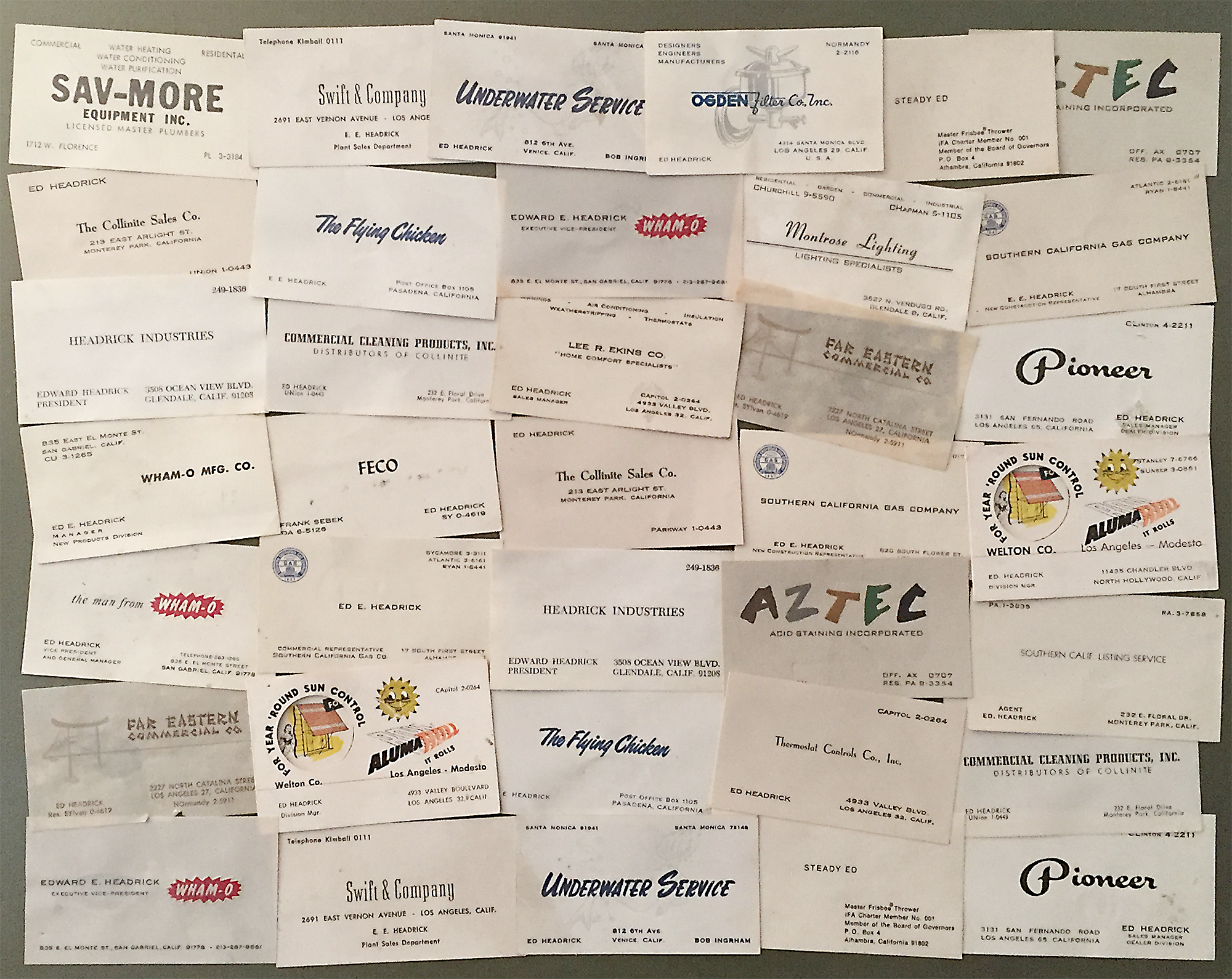
Photo of some of Ed Headrick's Business Cards showing a snapshot of some of his work history up until his time working at Wham-O.

== Personal life ==
Ed Headrick and his wife, Farina Headrick, had four children and 11 grandchildren. He said in an interview, ''We used to say that Frisbee is really a religion — 'Frisbyterians,' we'd call ourselves'". He speculated on life after death, suggesting people would not go to purgatory but ''we just land up on the roof and lay there.''

=== Ash discs ===
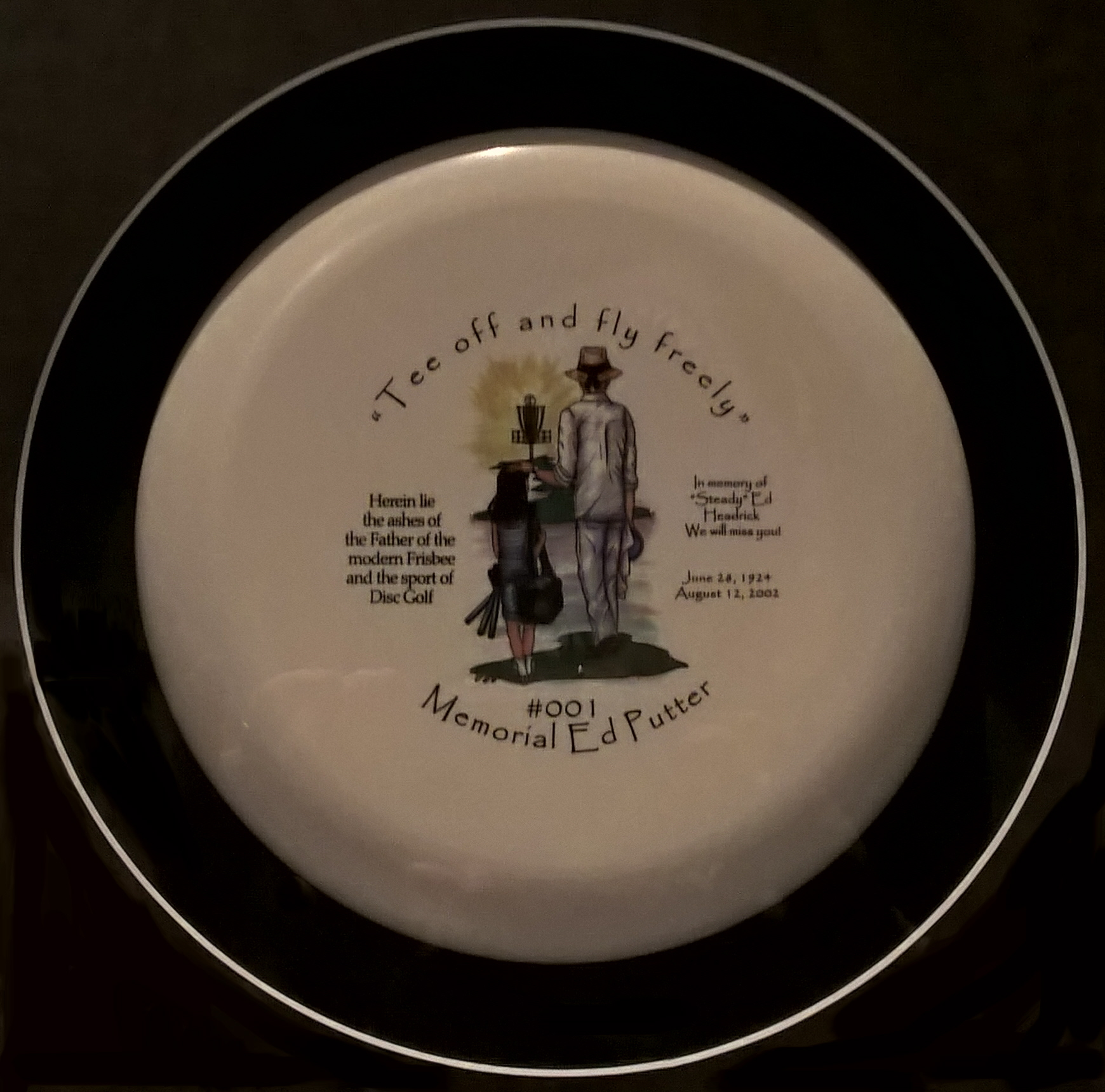
One of the ash discs containing some of the ashes of Headrick. On display at Ripley's Believe it or Not, London.

Per his wishes, Ed Headrick's ashes were incorporated into a limited number of discs. Some were given to friends and family and the remaining discs were listed for sale to fund a museum of Frisbee history and disc golf center in Columbia County, Georgia.
