= Joshua Gilpin =

American paper manufacturer (1765–1841)

- Born: November 8, 1765; Philadelphia, Pennsylvania, U.S.
- Died: August 22, 1841 (aged 75); Wilmington, Delaware, U.S.
- Resting place: Laurel Hill Cemetery, Philadelphia, Pennsylvania, U.S.
- Occupations: Paper manufacturer, writer

Joshua Gilpin (November 8, 1765 – August 22, 1841) was an American paper manufacturer from Philadelphia. Along with his brother, Thomas Gilpin, Jr. and his uncle Miers Fisher, he established the first paper manufacturing business in Delaware in 1787 at the Brandywine Village. In 1804, he introduced the technique of chemically bleaching paper-stuff from England to the United States.

Gilpin traveled to England in 1811 and collected information on the latest techniques in paper manufacturing including the Fourdrinier and Dickinson machines. Gilpin provided the information he collected to his brother Thomas and also hired an employee away from the Dickinson paper manufacturing factory with knowledge of the Dickinson machine. Thomas used this information to build and patent the first papermaking machine in the United States at their mill in 1817. The brothers became renowned for their fine paper and the invention of the "endless paper making machine" revolutionized the paper making industry.

Gilpin took copious notes during his travels on many topics including political and social conditions, wages, standards of living and his impressions of towns and countrysides. He published several books based on his travel observations and other topics such as poetry.

== Early life and education ==
Gilpin was born in Philadelphia on November 8, 1765, the oldest son to Thomas Gilpin, a prosperous merchant, and Lydia Fisher. Both his parents were Quakers. The family had extensive business in Philadelphia and owned flour mills in Maryland and Delaware.

The family originated in England and migrated to the United States at the end of the seventeenth century. They came from Kentmere in Westmorland, and maintained links with their English cousins, including William Gilpin, the artist. Gilpin's father, Thomas, was a correspondent of Benjamin Franklin, but was suspected of disloyalty during the American Revolution and was exiled to Winchester, Virginia, where he died in 1778.

Gilpin was educated by tutors and at the grammar school at Wilmington.

== Career ==
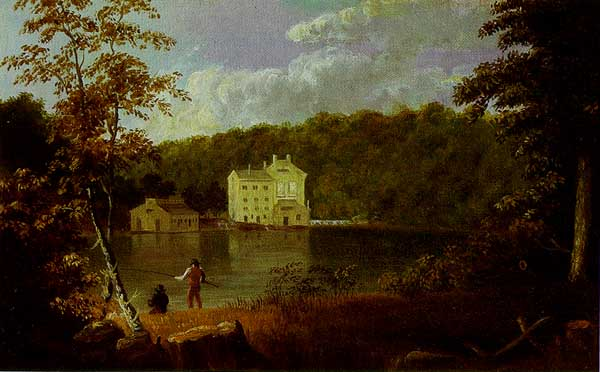
"Gilpin's Mill on the Brandywine" attributed to Thomas Doughty circa 1827

In 1787, Joshua, his brother Thomas, and their uncle, Miers Fisher, began making paper at a mill in the Brandywine Village along the Brandywine Creek in Delaware. The mill was originally built by their maternal grandfather, Joshua Fisher in 1765. The first batches of paper were created in June 1787. The entrepreneurs had help from Benjamin Franklin, who, in 1788, lent Miers Fisher some French books on papermaking. In time the mills prospered, specialising in banknote paper. The Gilpins supplied many States' banks as well as the United States Treasury.

The company was initially named Gilpin & Fisher but also operated under the names Joshua Gilpin and Company, Thomas Gilpin and Company and Gilpin and Company. It was known locally as the Brandywine Paper Mill.

On June 6, 1795, Joshua Gilpin traveled to England from Philadelphia on the William Penn. He spent the next six years touring the continent including the factories and mills of the Industrial Revolution. His travels took him throughout Great Britain and Ireland as well as the Low Countries, France and Switzerland. Gilpin wanted to learn all he could about modern methods of paper-making, and visited many other industries as well. He kept a diary of his travels with voluminous notes about the people he met, the industrial processes he inspected and his impressions of the towns and countryside.

During his time in England he gathered information about the application of chlorine to the bleaching of paper-stuff and applied that knowledge to his mill in Delaware. At that time paper was made from ground-up linen rags, which after fermenting and disintegrating needed to be bleached to make white paper. He witnessed the process first October 1795 in William Simpson's Polton Bank mill at Lasswade in Scotland, and later, in March 1796, in James Smith's mill at Maidstone, Kent. The process had been discovered by the French chemist Berthollet and introduced into Scotland by 1791 and England the following year. Gilpin and his family returned to America on October 15, 1801.

In 1811, Gilpin and his family returned to England, where they became trapped by the War of 1812 and had to remain until it was over. They lived in Yealand Conyers, and Gilpin was able to gather more information about new paper manufacturing methods, this time the cylinder-mould paper-making machine, developed by John Dickinson. The Gilpins returned to America in 1815.

Thomas Gilpin built the first paper machine in America, based on the information Joshua obtained during his travels about the Fourdrinier and Dickinson machines. The machine invented by Thomas closely resembled the Dickinson machine that Joshua had seen in England during his travels. Gilpin was able to lure the factory manager, Laurence Greatrake, away from Dickinson's factory by offering him a large salary. Greatrake brought one of the brass cylinders needed to run the machine with him. Dickinson severely criticized the Gilpin's for luring his employee away in order to steal his invention.

The Gilpin machine first produced paper in February 1817 and was used in the printing the edition of Poulson's Daily Advertiser published in that month. They also produced and sold the paper making machine to other manufacturers. The introduction of the paper making machine by the Gilpins revolutionized the manufacture of paper throughout the world. The Gilpins strove to keep their machine a secret, but rivals were eventually able to copy the technology.

For a time the Gilpin mill prospered as a result of the new methods, but an economic depression in 1819, coupled with Joshua's expenditure on a new house, Kentmere, (named after their Westmorland origins), as well as the cost of improvements to the mill caused a decline in fortune. The Gilpins also established the Brandywine Woolen Mill in 1812, but it flooded in 1822 and was sold in 1825. The paper mill was damaged by a fire and flood in the 1820s. The Gilpin brothers tried to sell the concern without success until 1837, when a group of Philadelphia businessmen purchased it. The last paper made by the Gilpins was in June 1837, 50 years after the enterprise began. The site of their mill was used later by the Bancroft Mills, one of the largest textile mills in the world.

The Gilpin family were promoters of the Chesapeake and Delaware Canal. Joshua was elected in 1803 as a member of the board of directors to the newly formed canal company and was involved in making a new survey. Gilpin was elected as a member of the American Philosophical Society in 1804.

Gilpin died on August 22, 1841, at his Kentmere residence in Wilmington, Delaware and was buried at Laurel Hill Cemetery in Philadelphia.

== Writings ==
Gilpin wrote and published several books including:

- Verses Written at the Fountain of Vaucluse (1799)
- Memoir of a Canal from the Chesapeake to the Delaware (1821)
- Farm of Virgil and other poems (1839)

His Journey to Bethlehem, comprising an account of a trip to Bethlehem, Pennsylvania, in 1802, and Journal of Western Travels, detailing a journey through Western Pennsylvania to Pittsburgh and back, in 1809, were published in the Pennsylvania Magazine of History and Biography in 1922 and 1926–27 respectively. The latter was published in an edited edition in 1975.

Gilpin's travel diaries for his first trip to Europe are in the Pennsylvania State Archives. They now comprise over 60 numbered notebooks, but a number are now missing, and it is not possible to establish an exact record of his itineraries. Several main European tours can be established:

- A journey up the east coast of England to Scotland and returning to London via Liverpool. September 20 – December 14, 1795. He saw a paper mill at Polton Bank.
- Two brief trips in the spring of 1796 examining paper mills in Kent and Hertfordshire. March 8–12 and 24–25, 1796.
- A journey along the south coast of England from London as far as Plymouth, returning by Taunton and Bath. April 22 – May 15, 1796.
- A brief journey to East Anglia. May 29 – June 11, 1796.
- A journey to Ireland via Gloucestershire and South Wales. His return to London from Ireland was by way of the Black Country and the industrial Midlands. July 11 – December 1, 1796
- The diaries are fragmented from here but there are an incomplete accounts of:

A journey including Bristol. February 12–17, 1797
A journey from Bath to Windsor. February 27 – March 3, 1797
A journey from Kingston on Thames to Westminster. July 10–19, 1797

- A major journey to Continental Europe taking in Holland, France and Switzerland. August 25, 1797 – [no date] April 1798 There is also a volume summarising his impressions of the entire journey.
- The diaries are again fragmented from here but there are an incomplete accounts of:

A journey from London to Matlock, Derbyshire via Birmíngham, August 21–29, 1799
A journey lasting a week and half in and around Manchester, September 1799
A journey from Lancaster to Liverpool, April 1–17, 1800
A journey from Broadway (Glos) to Blenheim Park (Oxfordshire), August 18–19, 1800
A journey from London to Lincolnshire via Cambridge. March 23–25, 1801

There is also a volume of observations on the Lancaster Canal.

On his return to America he made several journeys in Pennsylvania and Delaware, and these have been published in the twentieth century. See section 2 above These diaries are in the library of the Historical Society of Pennsylvania.

For his second trip to England, between 1811 and 1815, a number of notebooks survive, including one describing paper-making machinery, and another, textile mills in Lancashire and Yorkshire.

== Personal life ==
He married on August 5, 1800, Mary Dilworth, at the Quaker meeting house in Yealand Conyers, Lancashire. She was a daughter of John Dilworth, a Lancaster merchant and banker. Together they had eight children:

- Henry Dilworth Gilpin (1801-1860), 14th Attorney General of the United States
- Sarah Lydia Gilpin (1802-1894)
- Elizabeth Gilpin (1804-1892), wife of merchant Matthew Maury
- Jane Gilpin (1806-1806)
- Thomas William Gilpin (1806-1848)
- Mary Sophia Gilpin (1810-1890)
- Richard Arthington Gilpin (1812-1887)
- William Gilpin (1815-1894), 1st Governor of the Territory of Colorado

== Sources ==
- Gilpin, Thomas (1913). "Fairmount Dam and Water Works, Philadelphia". The Pennsylvania Magazine of History and Biography. 37 (4): 471–479. JSTOR 20086141.
- Joshua Gilpin, "Journey to Bethlehem", The Pennsylvania Magazine of History and Biography, Vol. 46. No. 1, (1922), pp 15–38.
- Joshua Gilpin, "Journey to Bethlehem (continued)", The Pennsylvania Magazine of History and Biography, Vol. 46. No. 2, (1922), pp 122–153.
- Gilpin, Thomas (1925). "Memoir of Thomas Gilpin". The Pennsylvania Magazine of History and Biography. 49 (4): 289–328. JSTOR 20086581.
- Gilpin, Joshua (1926). "Journal of a Tour from Philadelphia Thro the Western Counties of Pennsylvania in the Months of September and October, 1809". The Pennsylvania Magazine of History and Biography. 50 (1): 64–78. JSTOR 20086594.
- Gilpin, Joshua (1926). "Journal of a Tour from Philadelphia Thro the Western Counties of Pennsylvania in the Months of September and October, 1809 (continued)". The Pennsylvania Magazine of History and Biography. 50 (2): 163–178. JSTOR 20086605.
- Gilpin, Joshua (1926). "Journal of a Tour from Philadelphia Thro the Western Countries of Pennsylvania in the Months of September and October, 1809 (continued)". The Pennsylvania Magazine of History and Biography. 50 (4): 380–382. JSTOR 20086622.
- Gilpin, Joshua (1927). "Journal of a Tour from Philadelphia Thro the Western Counties of Pennsylvania in the Months of September and October, 1809 (continued)". The Pennsylvania Magazine of History and Biography. 51 (2): 172–190. JSTOR 20086637.
- Gilpin, Joshua (1927). "Journal of a Tour from Philadelphia Thro the Western Counties of Pennsylvania in the Months of September and October, 1809 (continued)". The Pennsylvania Magazine of History and Biography. 51 (4): 351–375. JSTOR 20086650.
- Gilpin, Joshua (1928). "Journal of a Tour from Philadelphia Thro the Western Counties of Pennsylvania in the Months of September and October, 1809 (continued)". The Pennsylvania Magazine of History and Biography. 52 (1): 29–58. JSTOR 20086657.
- Hancock, Harold B.; Wilkinson, Norman B. (1958). "Thomas and Joshua Gilpin, papermakers". The Paper Maker. 27 (2).
- Hancock, Harold B.; Wilkinson, Norman B. (1957). "The Gilpins and Their Endless Papermaking Machine". The Pennsylvania Magazine of History and Biography. 81 (4): 391–405. JSTOR 20089015.
- Sidney M. Edelstein, "An American Industry First: Rare document proves papermakers first to use chlorine for bleaching in the United States", Tappi Vol. XLIII, (April 1960) 40Aff.
- Hancock, Harold B.; Wilkinson, Norman B. (January 1960). "Joshua Gilpin: an American manufacturer in England and Wales, 1795-1801-Part II". Transactions of the Newcomen Society. 33 (1): 57–66. doi:10.1179/tns.1960.004.
- Hancock, Harold B.; Wilkinson, Norman B. (1962). "An American Manufacturer in Ireland, 1796". The Journal of the Royal Society of Antiquaries of Ireland. 92 (2): 125–137. JSTOR 25509475.
- Oaks, Robert F. (1972). "Philadelphians in Exile: The Problem of Loyalty during the American Revolution". The Pennsylvania Magazine of History and Biography. 96 (3): 298–325. JSTOR 20090650.
- Woolrich, A. P. (1973). "An American in Bristol and Gloucestershire". Transactions of the Bristol & Gloucestershire Archaeological Society. 92: 169–189.
- Joseph E. Walker, ed Pleasure and Business in Western Pennsylvania: The Journal of Joshua Gilpin. 1809, Harrisburg: Pennsylvania Historical and Museum Commission, 1975
- Bidwell, John (June 1982). "Joshua Gilpin and Lord Stanhope's Improvements in Printing". The Papers of the Bibliographical Society of America. 76 (2): 143–158. doi:10.1086/pbsa.76.2.24302712. JSTOR 24302712. S2CID 192954582. ProQuest 1301162526.
- G. E. Bentley, Jr "The Way of a Papermaker with a Poet: Joshua Gilpin, William Blake, and the Arts in 1796" Notes and Queries 1986, 33 (1), pp 80–84
- A series of articles published in The Quarterly, issued by the British Association of Paper Historians.
- A. P. Woolrich, "Scottish Mills as seen by Foreign Observers: The Travel Diaries of Joshua Gilpin, 1795, and Eric Svendenstierna, 1803", The Quarterly No. 19 - July 1996
- A. P. Woolrich, "The Travel Diaries of Joshua Gilpin: Some Paper Mills in Kent, 1796", The Quarterly, No. 20 - October 1996
- A. P. Woolrich, "The Travel Diaries of Joshua Gilpin: Some Paper Mills in Hertfordshire, 1796", The Quarterly, No. 21 - January 1997
- A. P. Woolrich, "The Travel diaries of Joshua Gilpin: Some Paper Mills in Ireland, 1796", The Quarterly, No. 22 - April 1997
