= United States Amateur Disc Golf Championships =

This is a list of United States Amateur Disc Golf Champions, that is, all the men that have won the United States Amateur Championship of the PDGA (Professional Disc Golf Association). The USADGC is held annually at the famed Toboggan Course at Kensington Metropark, north of Detroit, Michigan, in Milford, Michigan. The winner of the USADGC is given an automatic berth to the United States Disc Golf Championship, held in Rock Hill, South Carolina. The event has been held since 2002 in this format, with the winner frequently being picked up by Discraft, a disc manufacturing company out of Wixom, Michigan. Currently the record for margin of victory in the USADGC is ten strokes, held by David Wiggins Jr and set in 2010, Wiggins Jr also set a new record for total number of strokes under par (20). Todd White was the tournament director for the event from 2002 through 2008, after which he stepped down.

== USADGC Champions ==
Year	Date	Champion	Hometown	Margin of Victory	First Runner Up	Second Runner Up	Results
2002	September 13–15	Scott Burnett	Dayton, Ohio	7	Josh Whalen	Jon Burpee	PDGA
2003	September 12–14	Peter Middlecamp	Saint Paul, Minnesota	0 (playoff)	William Themm	Josh Sappenfield	PDGA
2004	September 10–12	Scott Slater	Livonia, Michigan	0 (playoff)	Patrick Blake	Josh Romine	PDGA
2005	September 9–11	Adam Olsen	Cedar Rapids, Iowa	4	Geoff Bennett	Robert Hammersmith	PDGA
2006	September 8–10	Steve Mills	Northville, Michigan	0 (playoff)	Daemon Stahlin	Josh Gerth	PDGA
2007	June 15–17	Jake Newell	Emporia, Kansas	1	Jamie Mosier	Michael Frame	PDGA
2008	June 13–15	Daemon Stahlin	Dexter, Michigan	0 (playoff)	Mark Roberts	Chris Wojciechowski	PDGA
2009	June 12–14	Blaine Kinkel	Charleston, South Carolina	1	Brad Frase	Jamie Mosier	PDGA
2010	June 11–13	David Wiggins Jr.	High Point, North Carolina	10	Richard Wysocki	Leif Swenson	PDGA
2011	June 10–12	Benjamin Calloway	Quad Cities, Iowa	Tie (won in a playoff)	Ben Askren	Leif Swenson	PDGA
2012	June 8-10	Ted Stoebling	Crystal Falls, Michigan	1	Mitchell Winters	Tim Barham	PDGA
