= John Houck =

Disc golf course designer

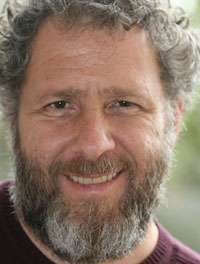
- Born: May 15, 1960 (age 66); Long Beach, California, United States
- Occupation: Disc golf course designer
- Spouse: Dee Leekha-Houck

John Houck was born May 15, 1960, in Long Beach, California. He has designed more Championship disc golf courses than anyone living today. Since 1983, he has been devoted to the evolution and promotion of disc sports, including golf, ultimate, and freestyle, with a focus on the growth of disc golf since 1988.

== Career overview ==
Houck began his career in disc sports with back-to-back World Champion titles in Freestyle Frisbee for 1984 and 1985. In 1989 John founded the Circular Skies Over Texas tour, which was the largest regional disc sports tour in the country. He was Commissioner of the Professional Disc Golf Association from 1994 to 1996, and was President of the Disc Golf Foundation from 1998 till 2014. He was inducted to the Disc Golf Hall of Fame in 1998 and the Texas Hall of Fame in 2017.

Houck was also inducted to the Freestyle Frisbee Hall of Fame in 2020 making him one of only three people who have held the honor of being a HOF member of two disc sports.

Houck was the Head of Course Design for the International Disc Golf Center for many years, and has designed or consulted on course designs for numerous world and national championships, with over 180 course designs, revisions, and consultations spanning his career. John Houck is also the creator of the PDGA Amateur World Doubles Championships. He created the first promotional global event for disc golf, World's Biggest Disc Golf Weekend(WBDGW), an international public event that was started in May 1991 and was active for 25 years. The event raised money for local, national and international non-profits while it introduced disc golf to people around the world. Houck's company, Circular Productions, held the event the first weekend in May every year and at its peak, the event was hosted by 130 cities around the world.

His course design was ranked #1 in the world by player reviews in 2021 and continuously in 2012, 2013, 2014, 2015,2016, 2017, 2018, and 2019, on the oldest and largest ranking platform for disc golf courses. Lakeside, Selah Ranch, Mt. Vernon, Texas, continues to rank #1 from 2012 thru March 2017. His course Harmony Bends at Strawn Park, Columbia, Mo is currently ranked #1 on DGCourseReview.com. He has designed the highest ranked course in Canada and the Canadian National Championships were hosted there in 2018 & 2019. In Texas, his designs fill the spots of #1, #2, #3 and #4th top ranked course in that state. Other states where his designs have the top ranking including Georgia, Missouri, Alabama, North Carolina, and New York.

The Admiral disc golf course in Semmes, Alabama was his 100th course and over 250 players from six states attended the sneak peek. The course is getting much usage and hosted two Professional Disc Golf tournaments in the first month of opening.

He designed his first vineyard course in 2017, Flat Creek Vineyard Disc Golf Course, Marble Falls, Texas. This course has become a popular destination for disc golf players.

In 2021, John continued to design courses for private landowners and clients who want to enjoy his designs at their estate or ranch. He designed a course in Portola, California. He also designed some 9-hole recreation courses for members of HOA's to enjoy. He continues to design and work on three separate private venues will offer his world-class championship design complex in Pennsylvania, Kansas, and Kentucky.

In 2021, John also started working on 2 private courses in Canada.

== Disc Golf courses ==
The first 100 disc golf courses (original version) were wholly designed by John Houck (some course designs are original and over 35 years old and others may have been modified by players/other designers):

1. The Admiral DGC, Semmes, AL
2. Cedar Glades County Park, Hot Springs, AR
3. Rose Hill South Championship, Kamloops, BC CANADA
4. Rose Hill North Championship, Kamloops, BC CANADA
5. Bonita Rec Center, Bonita Springs, FL
6. W.R. Jackson Memorial, IDGC, Appling, GA
7. Hobbs Farm, Carrollton, GA
8. City Park/Minerva Creek Park, Zearing, IA
9. Fox River Park, Ottawa, IL
10. Parc des Familles, Marrero, LA
11. Garland Scout Ranch, Stonewall, LA
12. South Pasture, State Forest, Nantucket Island, MA
13. Harmony Bends at Strawn Park, Columbia, MO
14. St. John's College, Santa Fe, NM
15. Rock Ridge Park, Pittsboro, NC
16. Frost Valley YMCA, Claryville, NY
17. City Park, Pauls Valley, OK
18. Hillcrest Farm, Bonshaw, Prince Edward Island, Canada
19. Lake Abilene, Abilene, TX
20. Cain Championship, Athens TX
21. Cain Park, Athens, TX
22. Pinnacle Country Club Championship, Athens TX
23. Aqua Fest Championship, Austin TX
24. Austin Ridge Bible Church, Austin TX
25. Bartholomew Championship, Austin TX
26. Raul Alverez Disc Golf Course, Austin, TX
27. Searight Alternate, Austin, TX
28. Searight Park, Austin, TX
29. Slaughter Creek Metro Park, Austin, TX
30. Southwest Trails, Austin, TX
31. Zilker Championship, Austin TX
32. Zilker Park Original, Austin, TX
33. Zilker Park South, Austin, TX
34. MetCenter, Austin, TX
35. City Lake Park, Boerne, TX
36. Guadalupe River Resort Ranch, Boerne, TX
37. Austins Colony Park, Bryan, TX
38. Camelot Park, Bryan, TX
39. Greenbelt Championship, Carrollton TX
40. Williamson County Park, Cedar Park, TX
41. City Park, Clute, TX
42. Research Park, College Station, TX
43. Wolf Pen Creek DGC, College Station, TX
44. Andrew Brown East/West, Coppell, TX
45. West Guth Park, Corpus Christi, TX
46. Dallas Baptist University, Dallas, TX
47. Edinburg City DG Course, Edinburg, TX
48. Graytown Park, Elmendorf, TX
49. Eagle Ranch DGC, Fort Worth, TX
50. Texas Christian University, Fort Worth, TX
51. Rivery Park, Georgetown, TX
52. San Gabriel Park, Georgetown, TX
53. Gonzales City DG Course, Gonzales, TX
54. Dixie Land Park, Harlingen TX
55. Quatro Hermanas Ranch, Henly, TX
56. Live Oak Park, Ingleside, TX
57. Schreiner University, Kerrville TX
58. Steeplechase Park, Kyle, TX
59. Lago Vista Resort Temporary, Lago Vista TX
60. Llano River Golf Course, Llano, TX
61. McCord Park, Little Elm, TX
62. Live Oak City Park Original, Live Oak, TX
63. Live Oak City Park Lake Course, Live Oak, TX
64. Live Oak City Park Hill Course, Live Oak, TX
65. Live Oak City Park East Course, Live Oak, TX
66. Badu Park, Llano, TX
67. Flat Creek Estate Vineyard, Marble Falls, TX
68. Westside Park, Marble Falls, TX
69. Wilson Creek Park, McKinney, TX
70. Wilson Creek Temporary, McKinney TX
71. Trey Deuce, Mt. Vernon, TX
72. Texas Twist, Mt. Vernon, TX
73. Prince Solms Park, New Braunfels, TX
74. Tournament Temporary, New Braunfels TX
75. Berry's Treasure, Port Arthur, TX
76. Circle R Ranch, Port Arthur, TX
77. The Ponderosa, Port Arthur, TX
78. Moody's Disc Country Club, Red Rock, TX
79. Harry Myers Park, Rockwall, TX
80. Brushy MUD DGC, Round Rock, TX
81. Old Settlers Park, Round Rock, TX
82. Old Settlers South, Round Rock, TX
83. Inwood Hollow, San Antonio, TX
84. Trinity University, San Antonio, TX
85. Colorado River DGC, San Saba, TX
86. Meandering Greenbelt DGC, San Saba, TX
87. Strawbale Field DGC, San Saba, TX
88. City Park, Seymour TX
89. Selah Ranch Lakeside, Talco, TX
90. Selah Ranch Creekside, Talco, TX
91. South Temple Community Park, Temple, TX
92. Riverside Park, Victoria, TX
93. Cameron Park, Waco, TX
94. Cameron Park Temporary, Waco, TX
95. Greenbelt Park, Wells Branch, TX
96. Rolling Meadow DGC, Wimberley, TX
97. Circ Hill DGC, Wimberley, TX
98. Woodway Park, Woodway, TX
99. Tall Firs DGC, Monroe, WA
100. Dry Creek Greenbelt, Cheyenne, WY

== Disc sports events ==
=== PDGA Amateur World Doubles Championships ===
Houck created and has hosted the PDGA Amateur World Doubles Championships each year for 16 years. From 2013-2016, this event was held at Selah Ranch in Talco, Texas, one of the most highly ranked courses in the world. Prior to 2013, it was held on Houck's personal ranch and courses. From 2017-2019, the event was held on a total of four courses. These courses are at Selah Ranch and at Trey Deuce Ranch near Mt. Vernon, Texas.

=== World's Biggest Disc Golf Weekend ===
In 1991, Houck created World's Biggest Disc Golf Weekend, an international disc golfing event that raises money for non-profit organizations. As of 2013, the event was taking place simultaneously in 15 countries and 135 cities. Headquartered in Austin, Texas in the first weekend in May, this event started in Zilker Park, Austin in 1991. Hundreds of thousands of people were introduced to the sport through this event in the 1990's and 2000 to 2012.

=== Texas Teams ===
In November, 2010, the Circle R Disc Golf ranch hosted the Texas Teams Tournament with over 500 players and fans from across the state of Texas attending a three-day event that included disc golf, camping, and live music. Texas Teams Disc Golf Championships are non-sanctioned events and players compete for honor and not official titles. Special team awards for this event include the "spirit award" and the "best dressed team award". Created by Houck in 2000 to provide an event for players who share the love of the sport to simply enjoy the weekend with other disc golfers, the Texas Teams Tournament became the largest disc golf non-sanctioned team event in the world by 2010. It was held at Trey Texas Ranch near Mt. Vernon, Texas in 2019.

== Disc sports media ==
- Contributing Writer, Design articles for the PDGA Disc Golfer Magazine
- Broadcast Commentator, American Freestyle Open 2014
- Co-host of PDGA World Championships videotape/DVD
- Narrator for PDGA National Tour DVD
- Star of the first ever "Learn To Play Disc Golf" videotape

== Awards and distinctions ==
- Freestyle Frisbee World Champion, 1984
- Freestyle Frisbee World Champion, 1985
- PDGA Board of Directors, position of Commissioner, 1994 and 1995
- World Disc Golf Hall of Fame Inductee, 1998
- Master Disc Golf Course Designer
- President of the Disc Golf Foundation
- Head of Design at the International Disc Golf Center in Augusta, Georgia
- Co-founder, Circular Productions
- Co-founder, HouckDesign
- Co-founder, Millennium Golf Discs
- Selah Ranch courses voted #1 and #2 in the world by DGCourseReview.com, 2012
