= DeLaveaga Disc Golf Course =

Disc golf course in California

Coordinates: 37°00′19″N 121°59′45″W

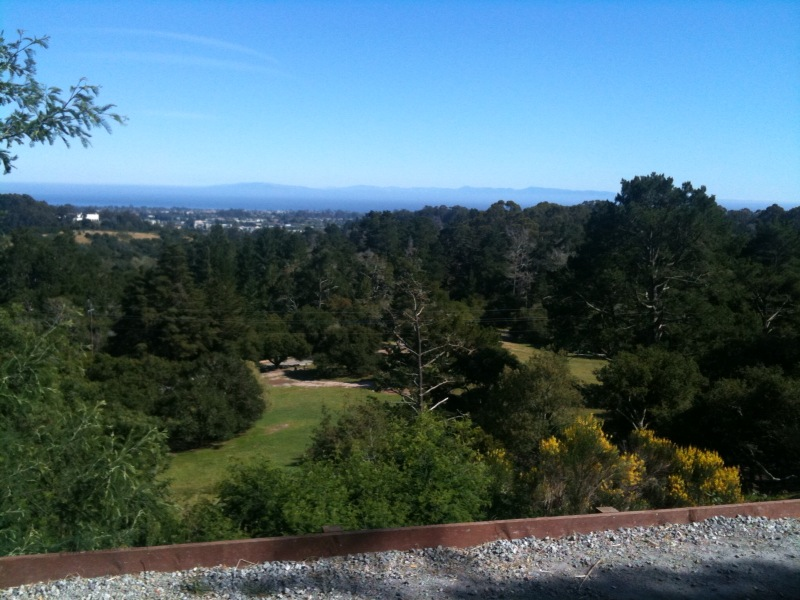
- View from Hole 27, "Top of the World"

Course information
- Elevation: 345 feet (105 m)
- Website: www.delaveagadiscgolf.com
- Established: 1983

Main
- Designer: Tom Schot
- Holes: 29
- Par: 57
- Length: 9,100 feet (2,800 m)

DeLaveaga Disc Golf Course, commonly known as "DeLa", is a world-renowned 29-hole disc golf course in the hills of DeLaveaga Park above Santa Cruz, California. It was established in 1984. It boasts one of the original long disc golf courses, with some holes measuring more than 500 feet in length. The 27th hole, known as "Top of the World," is one of the most famous holes in disc golf; the tee box is situated nearly 600 feet from the pin—and 100 feet above it. DeLaveaga placed #10 on Release Point's 2019 list of World's Best Disc Golf Courses.

Designed by Professional Disc Golf Association hall of famer and World Disc Games founder Tom Schot. DeLa was installed in 1984 and was one of the first organized courses for disc golf. Holes #8A and #26A were added later. The course is about 9,300 feet in length, with a mostly wooded holes and a few open one's. A wide variety of shots are required for this course, from uphill, downhill, flat, tight, and open tee offs. it includes some wide open meadows, cliffs and ravines, large redwoods, eucalyptus and oaks. The course is free to play though there is a US$2.00 parking fee. In 2011, the PDGA World Championships were held in California, and a round was played at the Delaveaga course. The 2011 Worlds were won by local Nate Doss. UDisc rated the course #10 in the world and #1 in California in 2020. Each May, the disc golf community descends upon Santa Cruz, for the Masters Cup, one of the PDGA's national tour events and one of the oldest tournament events in disc golf. Since 1991 it has also hosted the B-tier FaultLine Classic tournament
