= Sedgley Woods =

Section of the Fairmount Park System in Philadelphia, Pennsylvania

Coordinates: 39.981468°N 75.191685°W

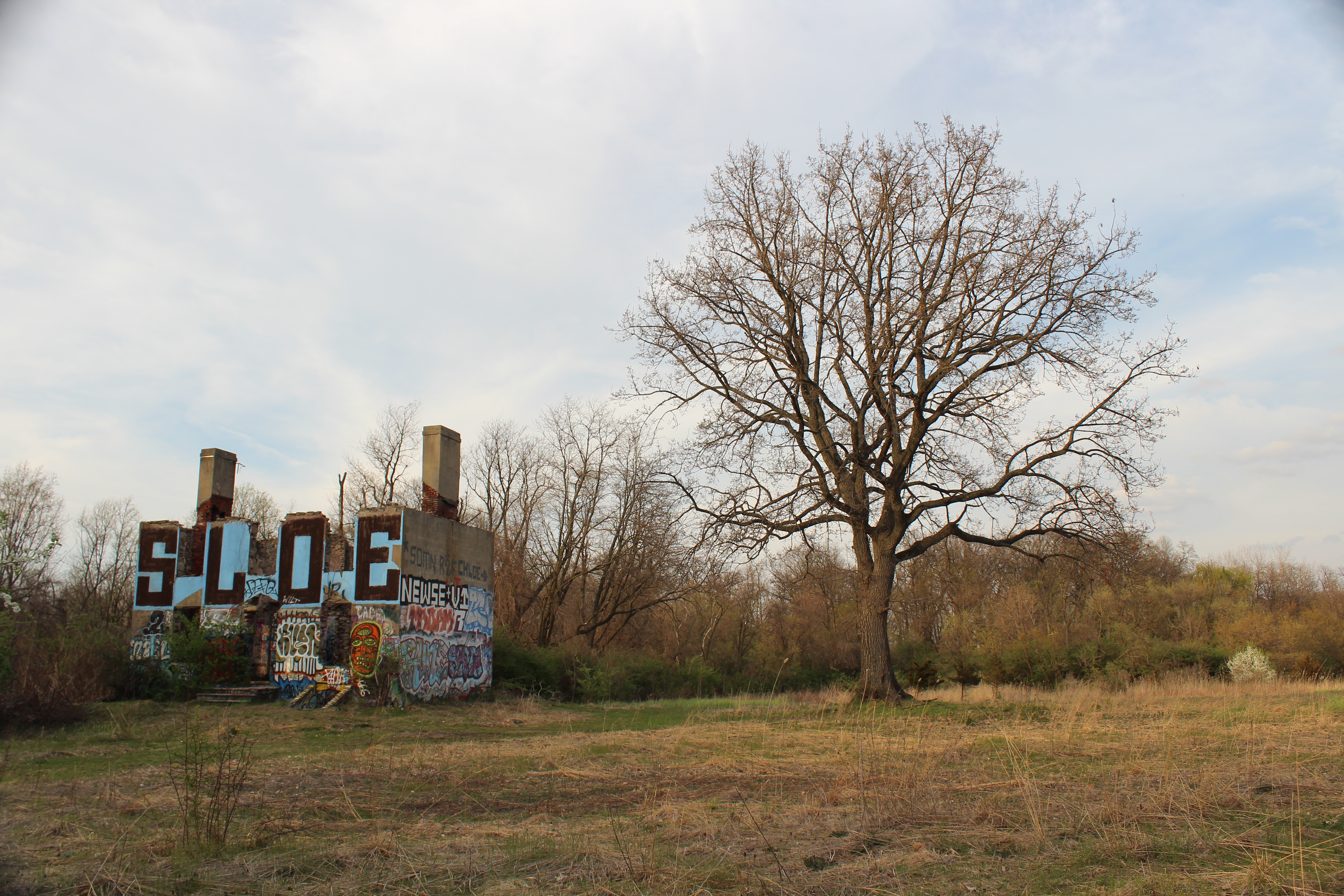
The graffiti-covered ruins of "The Cliffs", the 18th-century colonial mansion of Joshua Fisher and family, at Sedgley Woods in 2018

Sedgley Woods is a section of east Fairmount Park, Philadelphia, Pennsylvania, and a historical disc golf course site. The site was established in 1977 and has one of the oldest permanent pole-hole disc golf courses. The Friends of Sedgley Woods, a volunteer organization, maintains the grounds and runs monthly tournaments, community outreach programs, and occasional events with the Mid-Atlantic Disc Club and the Professional Disc Golf Association.

The area was the country estate of Joshua Fisher (1707-1783), a wealthy Quaker merchant from Lewes, Delaware, who purchased the 40-acre property in 1753 and constructed a colonial mansion known as “The Cliffs.” The mansion was destroyed by a fire in 1986 after decades of not being maintained.

More than 130 species of birds have been documented at Sedgley Woods, and breeding birds have been monitored at the site since 2016.

== Disc golf history ==
In 1976, after graduating from Penn State, where he played Ultimate Frisbee and created the Penn State Ultimate Team in 1974, Jim Powers, Joe D'Annunzio and Rick Vlam founded the Philadelphia Frisbee Club. He formed the new club by word of mouth and contacting local Frisbee masters. The members were interested in all flying disc games including Ultimate, disc golf, freestyle, Double Disc Court, and the field events of distance and self-caught-flight (maximum time aloft, MTA; throw, run and catch, TRC). The club began meeting and playing weekly at several areas around the city, most notably in Valley Forge National Park outside the city and within Fairmount Park in Philadelphia.

While Jim was establishing the PFC, "Steady Ed," Headrick and his son Ken were developing the Pole Hole, a disc golf target capable of catching and retaining a Frisbee. Steady Ed had just left Wham-O to set up his own company, the Disc Golf Association (DGA) and to found the Professional Disc Golf Association (PDGA). Like members of the PFC in Philadelphia, Steady Ed especially enjoyed the game of Frisbee golf. He and Ken believed that what the sport needed most was a standardized target. After testing numerous prototype baskets, Steady Ed proposed using suspended chains to arrest the forward motion of a disc, thereby allowing it to drop into a basket. Production of the first baskets followed after he and Ken patented their final design, later to be known as the Mach 1. They installed the first (and oldest permanent) Pole Hole course in Oak Grove Park in Pasadena, California 1976.

Wham-O brought Steady Ed and Jim together, bringing Pole Hole baskets to Sedgley Woods. Frisbee manufacturer Wham-O set up and funded the International Frisbee Association (IFA) to promote organized Frisbee play. To do this, the IFA established Regional Directors, a group of dedicated Frisbee people, one from each of 12 regions across the country. The Regional Directors communicated with clubs and players, organized tournaments, sanctioned events and records, distributed rulebooks, and other activities. Jim had just established a robust Frisbee club in a major metropolitan area, so he was appointed the Regional Director of the Northeast region. He and the other Regional Directors were invited to participate in the IFA's "Invitational World Frisbee Championships" held at the Rose Bowl in Pasadena, California. Jim met Ed Headrick and Wham-O officials there, who indicated they were interested in establishing the first Pole Hole disc golf course on the East Coast. Jim invited Ed and Wham-O reps to attend the first major PFC tournament, which will be held on Belmont Plateau in Fairmount Park, Philadelphia.

Early in 1977, the Philadelphia Frisbee Club hosted the multi-event "Philadelphia Frisbee Championships" in Belmont Plateau, also part of Fairmount Park. The tournament was well attended, both with competitors and spectators. The disc golf portion of the tournament was played on a temporary "object course" where trees were used as the targets. Steady Ed and Wham-O representatives were so impressed with the club and Fairmount Park that they offered to donate 18 baskets and tee signs if the club would handle the installation. Jim contacted the Fairmount Park Commission to explain the offer, and after three meetings between the commission and the club, a site was chosen in West Fairmount Park.

This site, the first, was near the site of the tournament, just off Belmont Avenue. Here, the club members met and laid out 18 holes through the densely wooded area. After 4 weeks of work clearing fairways through the trees, though, the park commission directed the club to change locations to Sedgley Woods in East Fairmount Park. The reason for the change is not documented, but potential reasons include wanting to bring more activity to the largely unused East Park, lack of off-street parking, and the possibility of additional amenities.

When club members visited the Sedgley site, they found a landscape that varied from small open areas to dense woods, with a predominance of lightly wooded land and gentle slopes. The area that became the front nine features many small-leafed locust trees and several huge oak and maple specimens. The trees in this area allow just enough sun for grass to grow below these trees. The area of the back nine is more densely wooded. Two ravines cut through the area with dry streambeds. The site is bounded by Reservoir Drive, a park road, on the North; the Smith Memorial Playground on the west; a ball golf driving range on the east; and a densely wooded unused area of the park to the south. The area takes its name from the Sedgley Estate, one of many private holdings along the Schuylkill River that were purchased to create Fairmount Park in the 19th century. The Sedgley Mansion was located on the south side of Girard Avenue, to the south of the course. Today only a gatehouse remains from the Sedgley Estate. Well beyond hole 12 and overlooking the river are the remains of The Cliffs, one of many "country" houses from the 18th century that dot Fairmount Park.

At the new site the club leaders, including John Schalberg, Max Smith, Rick Vlam, Joe D'Annunzio, and Jim, set about creating a course. Ed Headrick visited the site several times and provided the initial design. The layout, at 4,016 feet, utilized the existing landscape features to the best advantage. Holes were designed with narrow fairways through the tightly treed areas, and up, down, and across the modest hills, without the need for removing any large trees. Sedgley fit Ed's vision of how a disc golf course should be designed: a predominance of short holes each requiring a great variety of shots. Each hole was designed to be unique, both in length and the type and variety of hazards. Several holes were designed with both left- and right-curving fairways while some holes required roller tee shots because of the low-hanging trees very close to the tee. The woods at Sedgley and the areas of underbrush that line many holes are still challenging to disc golfers, leading to a reputation for excellent course design.

Sedgley was played as an object course for almost a year. Club members marked the original tees with signs made of upright 2x4s with the hole number and layout carved into its surface. The original targets were trees. In the summer of 1978, the Pole Hole baskets and tee signs arrived from DGA. The club members and Fairmount Park staff installed them, creating what they claim to be the first permanent Pole Hole disc golf course on the East Coast, although Leonard Park in Mt. Kisco, NY, and several ski hills in New England had Pole Hole baskets installed in 1977. It is probably one of the first 50 in the world overall and likely one of the first dozen to exist continuously.

Ed Headrick kept no official record of the original order of the first Pole Hole courses. Part of the confusion in the record-keeping stems from the fact that many disc golf courses existed with object targets before baskets were installed. Other early courses were not permanent.

In late fall 1978, two of the holes were lengthened. The club members decided that holes 2 and 12 should be more challenging and moved the baskets to permanent extended positions. Once the basket positions were fixed, the club members appointed a course pro, Max Smith, and began to have tournaments at Sedgley.

With the baskets and tee signs in place, Sedgley Woods was the site of numerous important Frisbee tournaments. The PFC, by virtue of strong club support and the Pole Hole baskets, bid for and won the right to host national golf events sanctioned by the IFA. These golf tournaments were part of the National Series Tournaments that ran from 1976 to 1982 and acted as qualifiers for the Invitational World Frisbee Championships. In addition to the NS meets OCTAD, a multi-event competition that started in New Jersey, came under the auspices of the PFC and was held at Sedgley for several years. The golf portion of these tournaments took place in Sedgley proper and the other events were held on the large ball-golf driving range next to the course and on the large field north of Reservoir Drive. These tournaments attracted the top players from across the country, including over 300 at one event. Players' packages for the competitors included everything from custom-printed discs and shirts to visors and hats. Various Philadelphia rock stations, including WMMR, WYSP, and WIOQ, sponsored these major tournaments, which drew many spectators and live FM radio media attention.

In the Fall of 1984 Darby Williamme, Jim Powers, and Dave Stembel created a new PDGA tournament course by designing a new set of tees. These tees are now the "yellow" tees. This was done in response to Innova's original Aero and Discraft's original Phantom discs which had allowed the average winning rounds to drop from 4 or 5 under to 10 or better. The course measures 4,754 feet from the yellow tees. The yellow tee layout quickly became the favorite course for the pros, though the blue tees are still played to this day in various competitive formats including best-disc doubles and the Sedgley Tag Challenge.

== Friends of Sedgley Woods ==
The Friends of Sedgley Woods is an organization dedicated to the preservation of Sedgley Woods Disc Golf Course and the development of the sport of Disc Golf in Philadelphia, Pennsylvania. This club was formed in 1990 after ten original Sedgley baskets were stolen. The first act of the Friends group was to raise money and replace all of the baskets with Mach 3 Pole Holes. The remaining "old" baskets were donated to other clubs to "seed" new courses. Sedgley now has three tee placements for each basket: the blue "original 1977 tees," the yellow "1984" tees, and the red "1991" tees (4,691 feet); however, all the baskets remain in their 1978 locations.

Since 1978, the Philadelphia Frisbee Club has evolved into several organizations devoted to disc sports. Many original club members have moved on to start new clubs and design new disc golf courses. There are now separate disc golf clubs in New Jersey, Delaware, and Bucks and Chester Counties in Pennsylvania as Pole Hole courses have spread throughout the East Coast. Along the way, the PFC became the PAFC, adding "Area" to its name. Later, it became the Tri-State Frisbee Club when a strong contingent of Delaware and New Jersey golfers developed. The Tri-State club begat the Mid-Atlantic Disc Club (MADC), which now runs a golf series enjoyed by thousands and has provided some of the largest purses in professional disc golf. The Ultimate players split off and formed their club called The Philadelphia Area Disc Alliance (PADA). In addition to fostering men's and women's tournament teams, PADA now runs a summer league serving over 800 people annually.

== Sedgley Woods Official Course Pros ==
- Max Smith: 1977-1978
- Rick Vlam: 1978-1981
- Darby Williammee: 1981-1989
- Barry Noakes: 1989-2015
- David Woods: 2016
- Alex Caldwell: 2017–Present
