= Disc Golf Association =

Disc golf equipment manufacturing company

- Company type: Private
- Industry: Disc golf equipment
- Founded: 1976; 50 years ago
- Founder: Ed Headrick
- Headquarters: Watsonville, California, U.S.
- Website: discgolf.com

Disc Golf Association (DGA) is a company founded in 1976 by Ed Headrick and located in Watsonville, California. The Disc Golf Association | DGA, is the founding company of the sport of disc golf and was the acting overseeing body for the sport until the establishment of the Professional Disc Golf Association (PDGA). The PDGA was run by Ed Headrick and the DGA until 1982. They are a manufacturer of disc golf baskets for the sports of Disc Golf. The company does not have any retail stores, but rather sells disc golf courses to park departments, disc golf clubs, and private parties. The company also sells large quantities of discs and other related disc golf equipment to resellers and wholesalers around the world.

Disc Golf Association's Mach 1 Disc Pole Hole disc golf basket was the first formal disc golf target to incorporate chains and a basket on a pole and became the Technical Standards used by the PDGA.

Disc Golf Association (DGA) sponsors a disc golf team called Team DGA and various Disc Golf Tournaments.

== History ==
The DGA was established by Ed Headrick in order to focus his attention on building and inventing equipment for the sport he founded. Ed Headrick coined and trademarked the term "Disc Golf" when formalizing the sport and invented the Disc Pole Hole (The Mach 1), the first disc golf target to incorporate chains and a basket on a pole.

Apart from establishing the Disc Golf Association (DGA), Headrick was the founding figure behind the International Frisbee Association (IFA) in 1967, as well as the Professional Disc Golf Association (PDGA) and the Recreational Disc Golf Association (RDGA). He standardized both the regulations and the gear used in the sport. Ed open-sourced his trademark term "Disc Golf" and turned over control and administration of the Professional Disc Golf Association (PDGA) to the growing body of disc golf players to run in 1983.

"Steady" Ed Headrick, suffered two strokes while attending the 2002 Professional Disc Golf Association Amateur World Championships in Miami. He died in his sleep, August 12, 2002, at his home in La Selva Beach at the age of 78.

As per his wishes, his ashes were incorporated into a limited number of discs. The discs were given to friends and family and the limited remaining discs will be sold with all proceeds from the sales going to a nonprofit fund for the "Steady" Ed Memorial Disc Golf Museum at the PDGA International Disc Golf Center in Columbia County, Georgia.

== See also ==
- List of disc golf manufacturers
- Sedgley Woods
