= Walter Frederick Morrison =

American inventor (1920-2010)

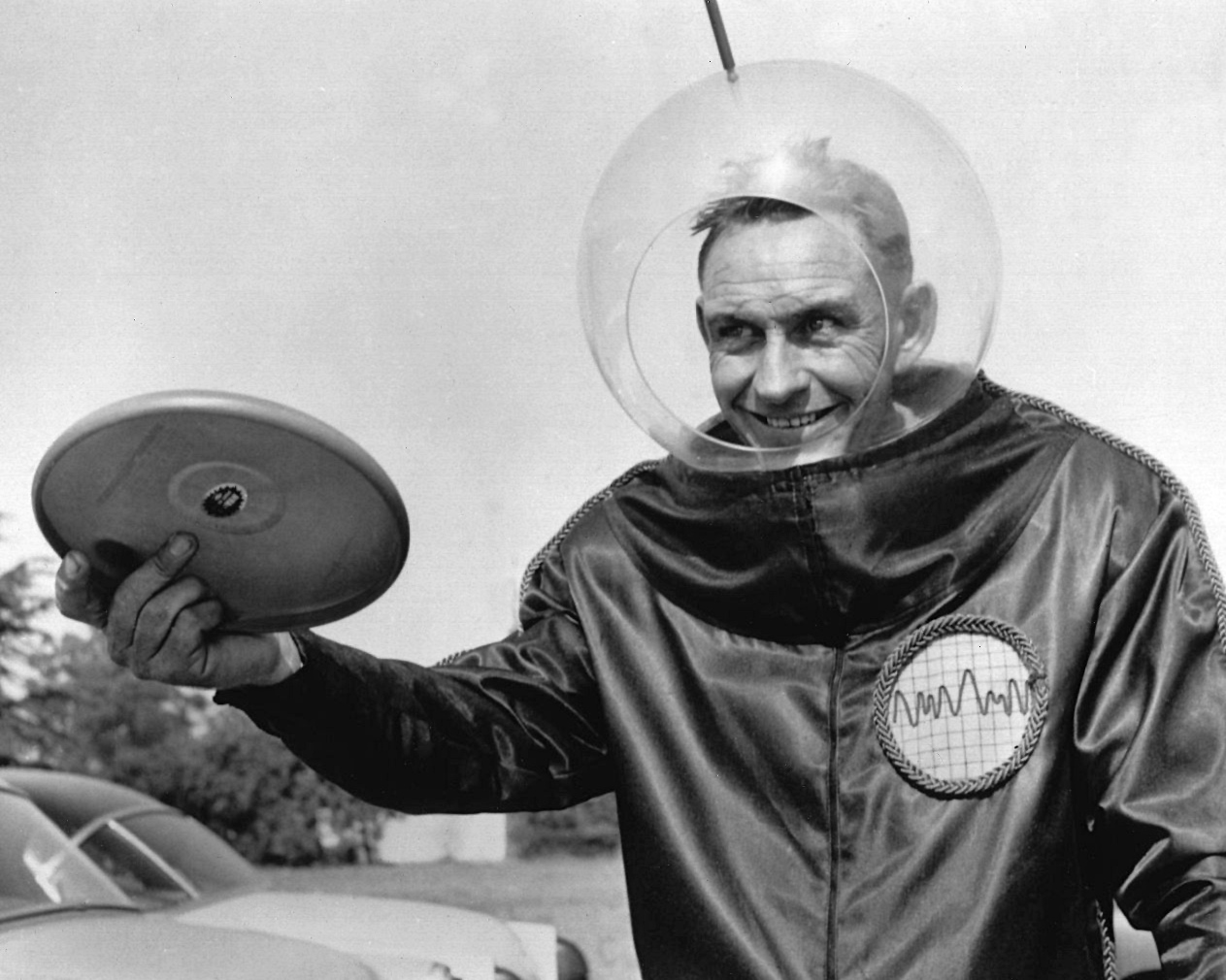
- Morrison promoting his Pluto Platters, the forerunner of the Frisbee, in the 1950s
- Born: January 23, 1920; Richfield, Utah, U.S.
- Died: February 9, 2010 (aged 90); Monroe, Utah, U.S.
- Occupations: Inventor; entrepreneur

Walter Frederick Morrison (January 23, 1920 – February 9, 2010) was an American inventor and entrepreneur, who invented the Frisbee.

== Early life ==
Walter Fredrick "Fred" Morrison was born on January 23, 1920, in Richfield, Utah, the son of Dr. Walter F. Morrison, an optometrist.

== Career ==
Morrison stated that the original idea for a flying disc toy came to him in 1937, while throwing a popcorn can lid with his girlfriend, Lucile Eleanor "Lu" Nay (1920–1987), whom he later married on April 3, 1939, in Los Angeles, California. The popcorn can lid soon dented which led to the discovery that cake pans flew better and were more common. A year later, Morrison and Lu were offered 25 cents (equivalent to $6 in 2025) for a cake pan that they were tossing back and forth on a Santa Monica, California, beach. Morrison detailed, in a 2007 interview, "That got the wheels turning, because you could buy a cake pan for five cents, and if people on the beach were willing to pay a quarter for it, well—there was a business." Morrison and Lu developed a little business selling "Flyin' Cake Pans" on the beaches of Los Angeles.

During World War II Morrison served as a P-47 Thunderbolt pilot in Italy flying 58 missions. He was shot down and was a prisoner of war for 48 days in Germany.

In 1946, Morrison sketched out a design (called the Whirlo-Way) for the world's first flying disc. In 1948 an investor, Warren Franscioni, paid for molding the design in plastic. They named it the Flyin-Saucer. After disappointing sales, Fred and Warren parted ways in early 1950. In 1954, Fred bought more of the Saucers from the original molders to sell at local fairs, but soon found he could produce his own disc more cheaply. In 1955, he and Lu designed the Pluto Platter, the archetype of all modern flying discs. On January 23, 1957, they sold the rights for the Pluto Platter to the Wham-O toy company. Initially Wham-O continued to market the toy solely as the "Pluto Platter", but by June 1957 they also began using the name Frisbee after learning that college students in the Northeast were calling the Pluto Platter by that name. Morrison also invented several other products for Wham-O, but none were as successful as the Pluto Platter.

== Personal life ==
Morrison and his wife, Lucile Nay Morrison, had a son and two daughters. After divorcing in March 1969 they remarried on April 3, 1971, then soon divorced again. Lucile died in 1987.

In 1994, Morrison caused a fatal car accident by failing to yield in his truck, killing an 18-year-old girl and injuring three others.

Morrison died at the age of 90 on February 9, 2010 at his home in Monroe, Utah.

== Published works ==
Kennedy, Phil (2006). Flat Flip Flies Straight, True Origins of the Frisbee, Wormhole Publishers
