= Professional Disc Golf Association =

International governing body of disc golf

- Sport: Disc golf
- Category: Flying disc sports
- Jurisdiction: Global
- Abbreviation: PDGA
- Founded: 1976
- Headquarters: Appling, Georgia, U.S.
- Chairperson: Conrad Damon, President of the Board
- CEO: Doug Bjerkaas, Executive Director

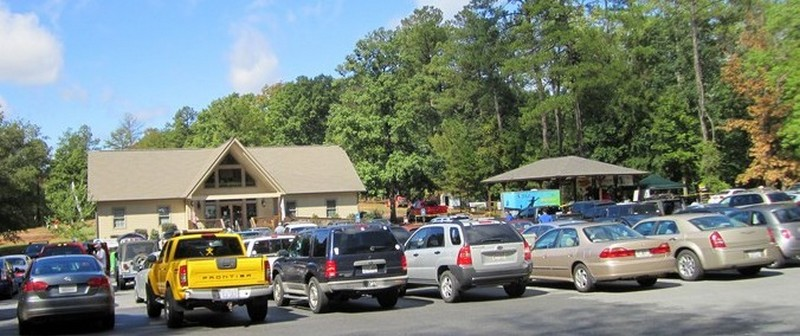
PDGA International Disc Golf Center during the September 2011 National Championship

The Professional Disc Golf Association (PDGA) is a 501(c)(4) nonprofit membership organization dedicated to the promotion and sustainable growth of disc golf. The PDGA is the global governing body of disc golf. The organization promotes the sport through tournament development, course development, rules and competitive standards, media and sponsor relations, and public education and outreach.

As of September 1, 2026, the current PDGA Board of Directors consists of President Conrad Damon, Vice President Terhi Kytö, Wilbur Wallis, Theo Pozzy, Charlie Mead, Matthew Rothstein, and Ben Shinn.

== Organizational structure ==
The PDGA is a nonprofit corporation and federally-recognized 501(c)(4) with Professional-class and Amateur-class members who pay yearly dues to belong to the organization.

=== Board of directors ===
Strategic planning and oversight is handled by the Board of Directors, usually comprising seven Board members elected by the active PDGA membership from a pool of candidates who must themselves be PDGA members in good standing. Potential candidates submit materials to the Nominating Committee, who determine the candidates who will actually appear on the ballot. Board members serve three-year terms, and elections are staggered such that only two or three members of the Board are elected each year. In 2026, the members elected Conrad Damon to his second term on the Board and Ben Shinn to his first term on the Board. In 2025, the members elected Charlie Mead and Matthew Rothstein to their first terms on the Board. In 2024, the members elected Wilbur Wallis and Theo Pozzy to their second terms on the Board and Terhi Kytö to her first term on the Board. In 2027, Wallis, Pozzy, and Kytö's seats will be up for election, with Wallis and Pozzy term-limited.

The Board votes to elect a presiding officer (the President of the Board) and a Vice President. The other Board members are Directors with no specific role. Board decisions require a quorum of four members, and most decisions are made by majority vote.

The PDGA's corporate officers are the Executive Director, Doug Bjerkaas, the Senior Director of Business Operations, Steve Timko, and the Senior Director of Policy & Compliance, Mike Sullivan.

Members of the PDGA Global Board of Directors
Position	Name	Country	Term
President	Nate Heinold	United States	2023–present
Vice President	Geoff Hungerford	United States	2023–present
Director	Theo Pozzy	United States	2024–present
Director	Terhi Kytö	Finland	2024–present
Director	Wilbur Wallis	United States	2021–present
Director	Matthew Rothstein	United States	2025–present
Director	Charlie Mead	United Kingdom	2025–present

=== Staff ===
The PDGA also has a professional staff that handles tactical planning and day-to-day operations, led by the Executive Director. The staff perform the critical functions of the PDGA, including organizational operations, membership services, quality control and operations at large events, support for tournament directors and events of all sizes, marketing and media, and technological advancements and event administration tools.

=== Volunteers ===
Finally, the PDGA has a team of volunteers. The State Coordinators, Province Coordinators, and Country Representatives manage the event calendars and serve as a front-line point of contact between the organization and the grassroots local clubs and Event Directors.

==== Committees ====
The PDGA's Committees are primarily volunteer-based, with most having a liaison from the staff and the Board. The current Committees are:

Policy Committees

- Rules & Regulations Advisory Committee - engages in problem-solving and pursues improvements to the Official Rules of Disc Golf, the Competition Manual for Disc Golf Events, or the PDGA Tour Standards.
- Technical Standards Working Group - ensures all approved equipment meets a standard set of dimensions and safety regulations.
- Environmental Committee - examines the challenges and solutions for disc golf's ongoing environmental stewardship and sustainability.
- Youth and Education Committee - focuses on expansion of disc golf in schools and in youth sports.
- Medical Committee - examines potential harms to player safety and well-being.
- Disciplinary Committee - creates, promulgates, and enforces standards of conduct and disciplinary action.
- Nominating Committee - vets candidates for the Board of Directors.

Constituent-Based Committees

- Diversity & Outreach Task Force - create strategies to bring disc golf to underserved populations.
- Women's Committee - advocates for women in the sport.
- Senior Committee - ensures the needs of disc golfers aged 50 and over are made clear.

== PDGA Majors ==
Majors are the highest level of disc golf competition. The current PDGA Majors held annually are: the Professional, Amateur, Masters, and Junior Disc Golf World Championships; the United States national championships (United States Disc Golf Championship, United States Women's Disc Golf Championship, United States Amateur Disc Golf Championship, Tim Selinske United States Masters Championships, and the National Collegiate Disc Golf Championships); a European Major (in 2026, the European Open in Estonia); and the PDGA Champions Cup. The current FPO World Champion is Eveliina Salonen of Finland (her second win) and the current MPO World Champion is Silas Schultz of the United States of America (his first win).

== Disc Golf Pro Tour ==
The Disc Golf Pro Tour (DGPT) is the Official Pro Tour of the PDGA. The DGPT is a private enterprise which partners with the PDGA (and in which the PDGA has a minority ownership interest). In addition to the 14 main medal play events and the DGPT Match Play Championship, the top touring pros can qualify for the DGPT Tour Championship, a seeded bracket of knockout golf performed at the end of every tour season. The 2025 DGPT Champions were Holyn Handley (FPO) and Calvin Heimburg (MPO).

== International Disc Golf Center ==
The PDGA International Disc Golf Center features a modern clubhouse with 2,700 sq ft (250 m^{2}) of amenities, art, and disc golf attractions. The clubhouse is home to the Ed Headrick Memorial Museum, which showcases many historical items from the early days of the sport including the first prototype Disc Pole Hole and flying discs from the Frisbie Pie Company pie pan, to the Frisbee, to today's modern high tech golf discs.

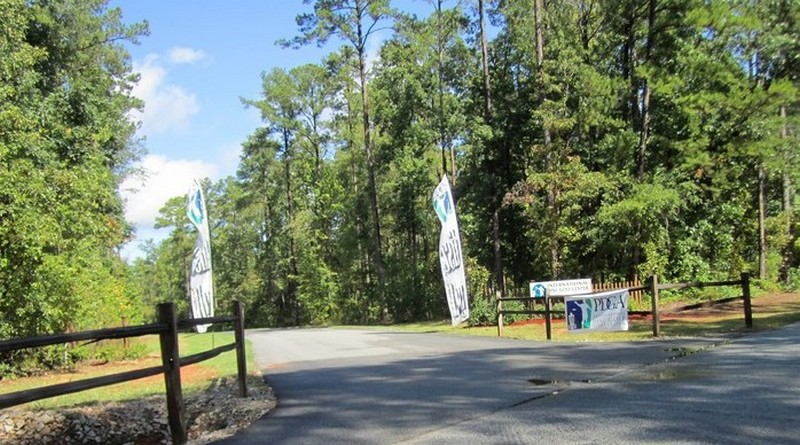
PDGA Entrance

The IDGC also features the World Disc Golf Hall of Fame. Located in Wildwood Park Columbia County, Georgia on Clarks Hill Lake. It is 22 miles from Augusta, Georgia. This 975-acre park is home to PDGA Headquarters. Prior to a Southern pine beetle infestation, it held three courses. The property is currently being redesigned and no courses are open for play at this time (summer 2026).

Previous Courses at the IDGC

The "Steady" Ed Headrick Memorial Course, presented by DGA, featured special edition Mach III baskets on rolling terrain along the shores of Clarks Hill Lake. The course was designed by Disc Golf Hall of Famers, Chuck Kennedy and Tom Monroe. Multiple target locations and tee areas made it very adaptable for all levels of play.

The Jim Warner Memorial Course was the most recently-installed course at the International Disc Golf Center. It featured Discraft Chainstar targets and was designed by Disc Golf Hall of Famer, Jim Kenner, with assistance from Ron Russell and Pad Timmons.

The WR Jackson Memorial Course was the longest and most challenging course at the IDGC. This course was designed by Disc Golf Hall of Famer, John Houck, and featured Innova DISCatcher baskets set in a very challenging championship configuration. WR Jackson hosted the long-running National Tour event, the Hall of Fame Classic, and was home to the inaugural PDGA Champions Cup.
