= FCHS =

FCHS may refer to:

== Schools ==
- Falls Church High School, in West Falls Church, Virginia, United States
- Fannin County High School in Blue Ridge, Georgia, United States
- Farmington Central High School (disambiguation)
- Fayette County High School (Georgia), United States
- Finchley Catholic High School, in London
- First Coast High School, in Jacksonville, Florida, United States
- Floyd Central High School (Indiana), in Floyds Knobs, Indiana, United States
- Floyd Central High School (Kentucky), in Floyd County, Kentucky, United States
- Floyd County High School, in Floyd County, Virginia, United States
- Fluvanna County High School, in Palmyra, Virginia, United States
- Ford City High School, in Ford City, Pennsylvania, United States
- Forrest City High School, in Forrest City, Arkansas, United States
- Forsyth Central High School, in Cumming, Georgia, United States
- Fort Campbell High School, in Fort Campbell, Kentucky, United States
- Fort Collins High School, in Fort Collins, Colorado, United States
- Fox Creek High School, in North Augusta, South Carolina, United States
- Frank Church High School, in Boise, Idaho, United States
- Frankfort Community High School, in West Frankfort, Illinois, United States
- Franklin Central High School, in Indianapolis, Indiana, United States
- Franklin County High School (disambiguation)
- Franklin Community High School, in Franklin, Indiana, United States
- Freeburg Community High School, in Freeburg, Illinois, United States
- Fresno Christian High School, in Fresno, California, United States
- Frontier Central High School, in Hamburg, New York, United States

== Other ==
- French Colonial Historical Society, see Michael G. Vann

== See also ==
- FCH (disambiguation)
