= Farmington High School =

Farmington High School may refer to:

- Farmington High School (Arkansas), Farmington, Arkansas
- Farmington High School (Connecticut), Farmington, Connecticut
- Farmington Central High School (Illinois), Farmington, Illinois
- Farmington High School (Kentucky), Farmington, Kentucky
- Farmington Central High School (Michigan), Farmington, Michigan
- Farmington High School (Michigan), Farmington, Michigan
- Farmington Senior High School (Minnesota), Farmington, Minnesota
- Farmington Senior High School (Missouri), Farmington, Missouri
- Farmington High School (New Mexico), Farmington, New Mexico
- Farmington Senior High School (New Hampshire), Farmington, New Hampshire
- Farmington High School (Utah), Farmington, Utah
- Farmington High School (West Virginia), Farmington, West Virginia
- North Farmington High School, Farmington Hills, Michigan
