= Farmington Hills, Michigan =

- City
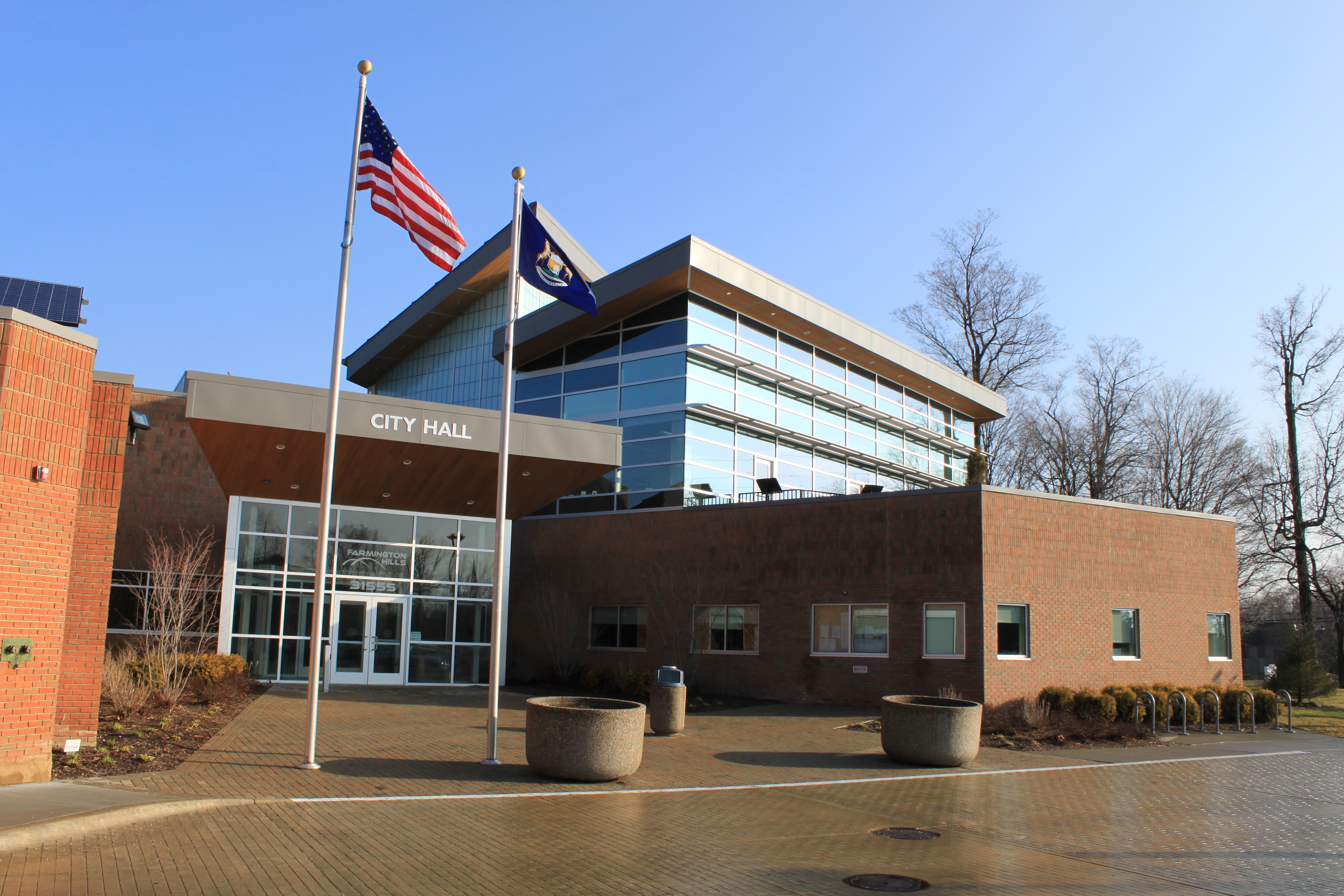
- Farmington Hills City Hall in 2012

- Flag Logo
- Interactive map of Farmington Hills, Michigan
- Location within Michigan Location within the United States
- Coordinates: 42°29′07″N 83°22′37″W
- Country: United States
- State: Michigan
- County: Oakland
- Settled: 1824
- Organized: 1827 (township)
- Incorporated: 1973 (city)

Government
  - Type: Council–manager
  - Mayor: Theresa Rich (D)
  - Manager: Gary Mekjian

Area
  - City: 33.30 sq mi (86.24 km^{2})
  - Land: 33.27 sq mi (86.16 km^{2})
  - Water: 0.027 sq mi (0.07 km^{2})
- Elevation: 860 ft (262 m)

Population (2020)
  - City: 83,986
  - Density: 2,524.5/sq mi (974.72/km^{2})
  - Metro: 4,285,832 (Metro Detroit)
- Time zone: UTC-5 (EST)
  - Summer (DST): UTC-4 (EDT)
- ZIP code(s): 48331, 48334–48336
- Area code: 248
- FIPS code: 26-27440
- GNIS feature ID: 1616988
- Website: fhgov.com

Farmington Hills is a city in Oakland County in the U.S. state of Michigan. A northwestern suburb of Detroit, Farmington Hills is located roughly 22 miles (35.4 km) from downtown Detroit. As of the 2020 census, the city's population was 83,986, making it the second-largest community in Oakland County.

Although the two cities have separate services and addresses, Farmington and Farmington Hills are often thought of as the same community. These two cities combined were part of Farmington Township in the time of the Northwest Territory. The community has several historical sites, including the Governor Warner Mansion. Both cities are served by Farmington Public Schools and the Farmington Community Library.

Farmington Hills is the home of the Zekelman Holocaust Center, the only Holocaust memorial in the State of Michigan. The Zekelman Holocaust Center was originally located in neighboring West Bloomfield Township, but has since expanded and moved to its current facility.

== Geography ==
According to the United States Census Bureau, the city has a total area of 33.31 square miles (86.27 km^{2}), of which 33.28 square miles (86.19 km^{2}) is land and 0.03 square miles (0.08 km^{2}) is water. Farmington Hills is bordered by West Bloomfield to the north, Franklin and Southfield to the east, Livonia to the south, and Novi to the west.

== History ==
The first white settler in what became Farmington Township was a Quaker from Farmington, New York, named Arthur Power. He purchased land in 1823 and returned in 1824 with a group of families and associates to clear the land. The settlement became known as Quakertown. A post office was established in February 1826 with the name of Farmington. The original post office is still standing today and is a designated historic site. The township of Farmington was organized in 1827, and the settlement was incorporated as the village of Farmington in the winter of 1866–67. A fire on October 9, 1872, destroyed many buildings in the village center. Farmington was incorporated as a city in 1926.

A small settlement was also developed in Clarenceville, in the extreme southeast corner of the township on the boundary with Livonia in Wayne County. Stephen Jennings built a tavern and a general store (now the Botsford Inn) to accommodate travelers on the plank road between Detroit and Howell. The name remains in the Clarenceville School District. Even though the school buildings for Clarenceville are in Livonia in Wayne County, the school district serves a portion of Farmington Hills.

In 1839, a post office named East Farmington was opened, but it closed in 1842.

In 1847, a post office named North Farmington was established a mile south of the township line as Wolcott's Corners. After the death of postmaster Chauncey D. Walcott in 1865, the office moved to the township line in the northeast quarter of section 4 (near the intersection of 14 Mile Road and Farmington Road). The post office functioned until September 1902.

Before the remainder of Farmington Township was incorporated as the city of Farmington Hills, there were two other incorporated entities within its boundaries. The first began as a subdivision named Quaker Valley Farms that was incorporated as the village of Quakertown in 1959. The other was Wood Creek Farms, developed in 1937 as a subdivision by George Wellington of Franklin, who named it after a New England estate. It was incorporated as a village in 1957. The villages, together with the remainder of Farmington Township, were incorporated into the City of Farmington Hills in 1973. The City grew rapidly throughout the mid-20th century.

A community called Quakertown North was recognized in the 1970 United States census, with a population of 7,101 recorded. It was located north of the former municipality of Quakertown. The land area was 1.6 square miles and a housing unit count of 1,803. The area, along with neighboring communities merged, to the newly created city of Farmington Hills in 1973. The ZIP code serving the area was 48331.

== Economy ==
Farmington Hills is home to the headquarters of numerous major companies, including Gale, Mango Languages, 5-Hour Energy, and The Sharper Image, as well as the United States headquarters of Bosch, Mercedes-Benz Financial Services, and TD Auto Finance. The city was also previously home to the headquarters of Compuware, White Motor Company, A&W Restaurants, and Michigan National Bank.

Nissan's North American technical center is located in Farmington Hills. The Nissan technical center handled project engineering of vehicle bodies used in North America and Latin America. It also has a small laboratory, where as of 2012, research is being conducted with hydrogen fuel cells. The company planned to add electrical battery and recharging of electrical vehicle research to the laboratory. As of January 2012 the technical center had 800 full-time employees. At that time Nissan planned to hire 150 more engineers to work in the technical center. The technical center opened in November 1991 at a cost of $80 million. In 2005, Nissan added a $14 million design studio at their Farmington Hills campus, and the Nissan AZEAL was the first car to be designed there.

Hitachi Automotive Systems Americas, Inc. maintains an office in Farmington Hills, as does Panasonic Automotive Systems. Lordstown Motors operates a research and development center in Farmington Hills.

According to the city's 2019 Comprehensive Annual Financial Report, the top local employers are:

#	Employer	# of Employees
1	Beaumont Hospital	2,500
2	Robert Bosch Corporation	1,400
3	Nissan Technical Center North America	1,200
4	Hitachi	1,200
5	Farmington Public Schools	1,100
6	TRW Automotive Electronics	650
7	Mercedes-Benz Financial Services	650
8	Concentrix	550
9	Gale	500
10	Mahle	500

== Government and politics ==
Farmington Hills operates under the council-manager form of government. It is governed by a 7-member city council, consisting of a mayor elected to two-year terms, and six councilmembers elected to staggered four-year terms. Councilmembers serve at-large, and are elected in a nonpartisan capacity in odd-numbered years. Mayors are limited to two consecutive terms, while other councilmembers are not subject to term limits. The council elects one of its members to serve as mayor pro tempore.

Current councilmembers
Councilmember	Since	Term expires
Theresa Rich (mayor)	2023	2025
Jon Aldred	2023	2027
Jackie Boleware	2019	2027
Michael Bridges	2008	2025
Randy Bruce	2021	2025
Bill Dwyer	2023	2027
Valerie Knol	2015	2025

The city council appoints a city manager, who manages the day-to-day operations of the city; a clerk who oversees elections and maintains city codes, ordinances, resolutions and other legal documents; and a city attorney who acts as a legal advisor and representative for all City matters.

=== Federal, state, and county legislators ===
United States House of Representatives
District	Representative	Party	Since
11th	Haley Stevens	Democratic	2023 (Note: Stevens has represented the 11th district since 2019, but the district has only included Farmington Hills since 2023.)

Michigan Senate
District	Senator	Party	Since
6th	Mary Cavanagh	Democratic	2023
13th	Rosemary Bayer	Democratic	2023

Michigan House of Representatives
District	Representative	Party	Since
18th	Jason Hoskins	Democratic	2023
19th	Samantha Steckloff	Democratic	2021 (Note: Steckloff has represented all or part of Farmington Hills since 2021, but has only represented the 19th district since 2023.)
21st	Kelly Breen	Democratic	2023

Oakland County Board of Commissioners
District	Commissioner	Party	Since
15	Gwen Markham	Democratic	2019
16	William Miller	Democratic	2019

=== Councils and commissions ===
The Mayor's Youth Council is an active teen committee/council who work under the city to help address teen problems and issues. This council helped to build the Riley Skate Park (the largest skate park in the Midwest), and sends delegates to the National League of Cities (NLC) conferences, has articles published in the local newspaper, helps run citywide events, organizes battle of the bands, and hosts their own talk show.

The Commission for Children, Youth and Families, operated in partnership with neighboring Farmington, is dedicated to creating a welcoming community for individuals of all ages and backgrounds. With a special emphasis on volunteerism, community service, and education, the Commission partners with the Multi-Racial Multi-Cultural Commission (MRMC), the Commission on Aging, Farmington Public School District, and the Farmington Public Library to inform residents on a variety of quality-of-life issues designed to promote wellness, access, and knowledge.

=== Proposed merger with Farmington ===
In 2006, a public meeting was held in Farmington Hills to discuss the possible merger with Farmington as a money-saving venture and also as a way to keep the two communities vibrant. Farmington and Farmington Hills already share several services, such as a school district, a library system, and a district court. However, both cities utilize their own fire departments, and Farmington has a public safety department rather than a police department.

== Demographics ==
Historical population
Census	Pop.	Note	%±
1980	58,056		—
1990	74,611		28.5%
2000	82,111		10.1%
2010	79,740		−2.9%
2020	83,986		5.3%
2018 Estimate

According to a 2015 estimate, the median income for a household in the city was $93,274, and the median income for a family was $198,136. Males had a median income of $61,757 versus $39,540 for females. The per capita income for the city was $36,134. Farmington Hills is well known for its luxury estates, its rolling hills, and is also listed on Forbes as one of the most prosperous suburbs in the US, with a household net worth of $725,120. About 2.4% of families and 4.1% of the population were below the poverty line, including 3.2% of those under age 18 and 7.6% of those age 65 or over.

=== Racial and ethnic composition ===
Farmington Hills, Michigan – Racial and ethnic composition Note: the US Census treats Hispanic/Latino as an ethnic category. This table excludes Latinos from the racial categories and assigns them to a separate category. Hispanics/Latinos may be of any race.
Race / ethnicity (NH = Non-Hispanic)	Pop 2000	Pop 2010	Pop 2020	% 2000	% 2010	% 2020
White alone (NH)	67,250	54,466	49,603	81.90%	68.30%	59.06%
Black or African American alone (NH)	5,681	13,768	15,268	6.92%	17.27%	18.18%
Native American or Alaska Native alone (NH)	132	139	110	0.16%	0.17%	0.13%
Asian alone (NH)	6,184	8,063	12,867	7.53%	10.11%	15.32%
Native Hawaiian or Pacific Islander alone (NH)	14	12	20	0.02%	0.02%	0.02%
Other race alone (NH)	145	144	374	0.18%	0.18%	0.45%
Mixed race or Multiracial (NH)	1,494	1,604	3,104	1.82%	2.01%	3.70%
Hispanic or Latino (any race)	1,211	1,544	2,640	1.47%	1.94%	3.14%
Total	82,111	79,740	83,986	100.00%	100.00%	100.00%

=== 2020 census ===
As of the 2020 census, Farmington Hills had a population of 83,986 and a population density of 2,396.0 inhabitants per square mile (925.1/km^{2}). The median age was 41.6 years. 18.3% of residents were under the age of 18 and 20.1% of residents were 65 years of age or older. For every 100 females there were 93.7 males, and for every 100 females age 18 and over there were 91.9 males age 18 and over.

There were 35,352 households in Farmington Hills, of which 25.0% had children under the age of 18 living in them. Of all households, 49.6% were married-couple households, 18.8% were households with a male householder and no spouse or partner present, and 27.2% were households with a female householder and no spouse or partner present. About 31.7% of all households were made up of individuals and 13.2% had someone living alone who was 65 years of age or older.

There were 37,382 housing units, of which 5.4% were vacant. The homeowner vacancy rate was 1.0% and the rental vacancy rate was 8.2%.

100.0% of residents lived in urban areas, while 0.0% lived in rural areas.

Racial composition as of the 2020 census
Race	Number	Percent
White	50,122	59.7%
Black or African American	15,370	18.3%
American Indian and Alaska Native	147	0.2%
Asian	12,882	15.3%
Native Hawaiian and Other Pacific Islander	22	0.0%
Some other race	927	1.1%
Two or more races	4,516	5.4%

=== 2010 census ===
As of the census of 2010, there were 79,740 people, 33,559 households, and 21,412 families residing in the city. The population density was 2,396.0 inhabitants per square mile (925.1/km^{2}). There were 36,178 housing units at an average density of 1,087.1 per square mile (419.7/km^{2}). The racial makeup of the city was 69.7% White, 17.4% African American, 0.2% Native American, 10.1% Asian, 0.4% from other races, and 2.2% from two or more races. Together, individuals of Hispanic or Latino identification comprised 1.9% of the population.

There were 33,559 households, of which 29.1% had children under the age of 18 living with them, 50.7% were married couples living together, 9.9% had a female householder with no husband present, 3.2% had a male householder with no wife present, and 36.2% were non-families. 31.5% of all households were made up of individuals, and 12% had someone living alone who was 65 years of age or older. The average household size was 2.36 and the average family size was 3.00.

The median age in the city was 42.1 years. 21.5% of residents were under the age of 18; 7.1% were between the ages of 18 and 24; 25.2% were from 25 to 44; 30.2% were from 45 to 64; and 15.9% were 65 years of age or older. The gender makeup of the city was 47.1% male and 52.9% female.

In April 2013, Farmington Hills had the fourth largest Japanese national population in the state of Michigan, at 589.

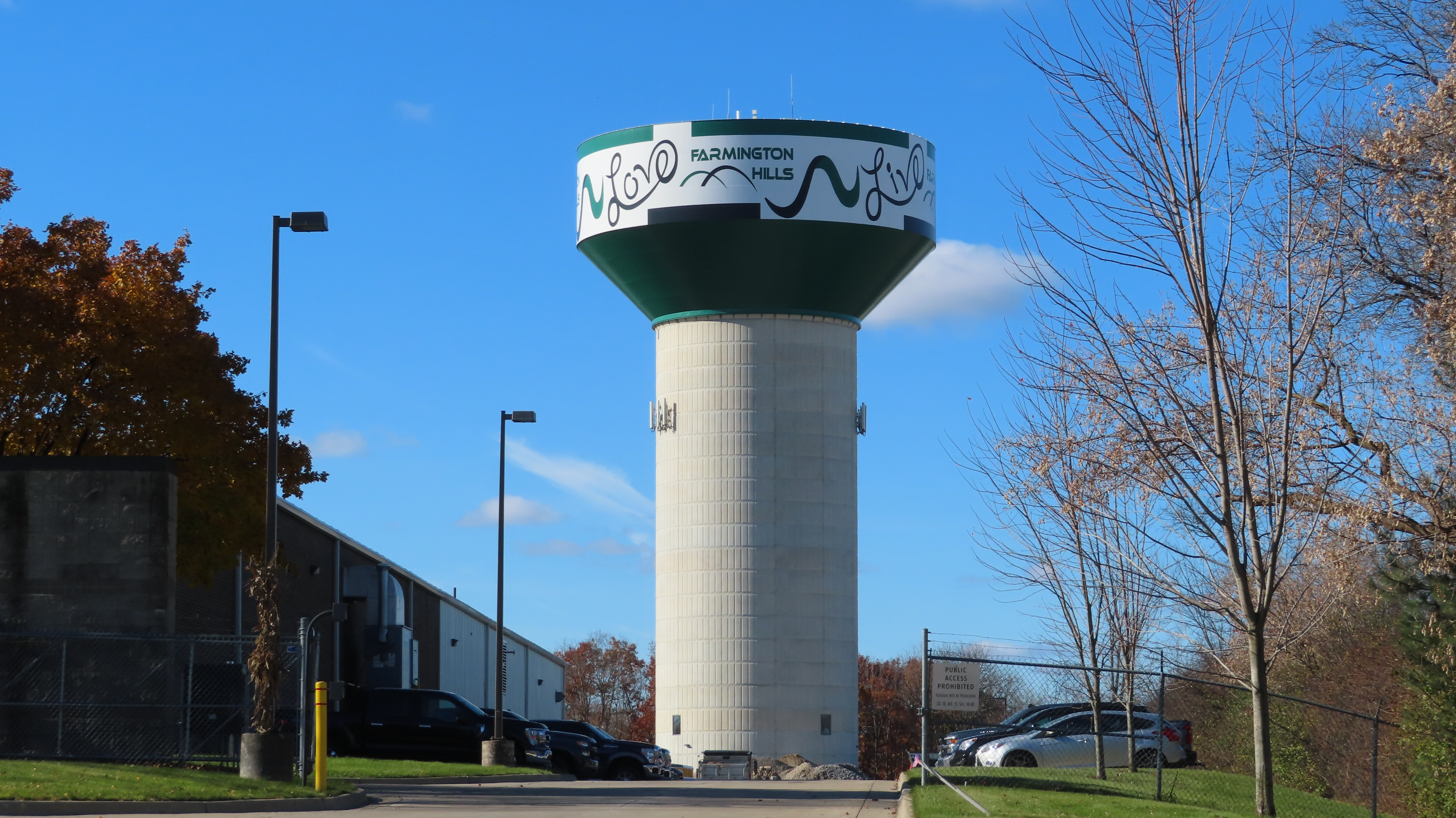
Farmington Hills water tower, completed in 2014

=== 2000 census ===
As of the census of 2000, there were 82,111 people, 33,559 households, and 21,813 families residing in the city. The population density was 2,466.4 inhabitants per square mile (952.3/km^{2}). There were 34,858 housing units at an average density of 1,047.0 per square mile (404.2/km^{2}). The racial makeup of the city was 82.95% White, 6.94% African American, 0.17% Native American, 7.54% Asian, 0.02% Pacific Islander, 0.46% from other races, and 1.93% from two or more races. Hispanic or Latino of any race were 1.47% of the population. 12.6% were of German, 9.1% Polish, 8.3% Irish, 7.1% English and 5.5% Italian ancestry according to Census 2000.

There were 33,559 households, out of which 29.5% had children under the age of 18 living with them, 56.0% were married couples living together, 6.6% had a female householder with no husband present, and 35.0% were non-families. 29.6% of all households were made up of individuals, and 10.2% had someone living alone who was 65 years of age or older. The average household size was 2.41 and the average family size was 3.04.

In the city, the population was spread out, with 23.1% under the age of 18, 6.7% from 18 to 24, 31.3% from 25 to 44, 24.6% from 45 to 64, and 14.4% who were 65 years of age or older. The median age was 39 years. For every 100 females, there were 93.8 males. For every 100 females age 18 and over, there were 90.2 males.

== Education ==
=== Primary and secondary schools ===
Almost all of Farmington Hills is located in the Farmington Public Schools district. The district includes eight elementary schools, three middle schools, and one K-8 lottery school, of which all but one are located in Farmington Hills. North Farmington High School, a large traditional high school, and Farmington Central High School, a smaller alternative high school, are located in Farmington Hills, and Farmington High School in neighboring Farmington also serves portions of Farmington Hills. Harrison High School also operated in the city from 1970 until its closure in 2019, after which it was repurposed as a community center, named The Hawk.

Small portions of the city are within the Clarenceville and Walled Lake Consolidated school districts. The city is also home to Oakland Early College, an early college high school administered by the West Bloomfield School District.

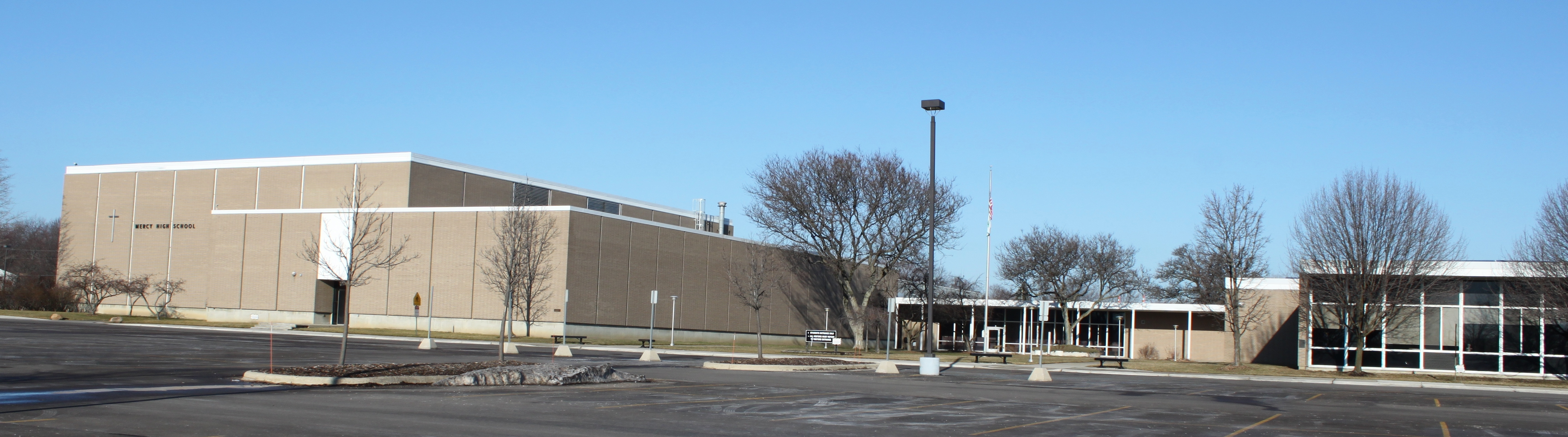
Mercy High School

The area includes several private schools, including two parochial Catholic schools, Our Lady of Sorrows and St. Fabian, run by the Archdiocese of Detroit. St. Fabian is in Farmington Hills, and Our Lady of Sorrows School is in Farmington. Farmington Hills also includes an all-girls Catholic high school, Mercy High School, one Lutheran school, Concordia Lutheran School/St. Paul's Lutheran Preschool, and Hillel Day School, a non-denominational Jewish day school.

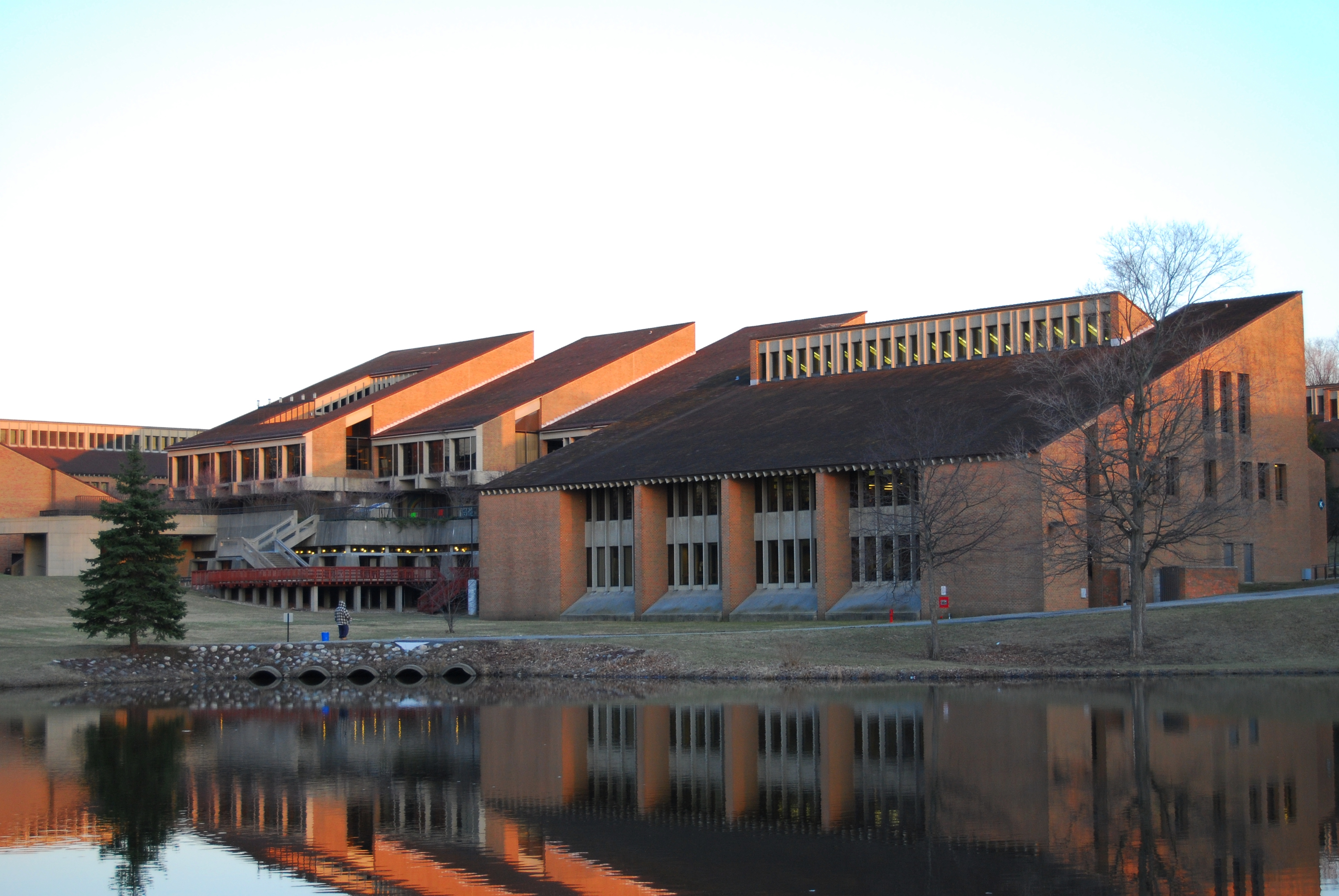
Oakland Community College, Orchard Ridge Campus

=== Colleges and universities ===
The Orchard Ridge campus of Oakland Community College is located in Farmington Hills, as is the Michigan School of Psychology.

Farmington Hills was also the location for the fictitious University of Farmington, created by the U.S. Immigration and Customs Enforcement's Homeland Security Investigations (HSI) as part of a sting operation.

== Transportation ==
The major thoroughfares in the city are M-5, Orchard Lake Road, 12 Mile Road, 8 Mile Road, Northwestern Highway, I-696, and I-275. The city contains several freeway interchanges connecting local roads to the two interstates. Public transit services are provided by SMART.

== Notable people ==
Notable current and former residents include:

- Jena Irene Asciutto, singer, American Idol runner-up
- Steve Ballmer, businessman, former CEO of Microsoft, owner of the NBA's Los Angeles Clippers
- Elizabeth Berkley, actress
- Jody Lockman, inventor of the corn flake shake
- Manoj Bhargava, founder and CEO, 5-hour Energy
- Pam Dawber, actress
- Alex DeBrincat, NHL hockey player for the Detroit Red Wings
- Colin Egglesfield, actor
- Sean Forbes Award Winning Deaf Musician
- Donald Foss (born 1945), billionaire founder of subprime car finance company Credit Acceptance
- Cam Fowler, NHL hockey player for the St. Louis Blues
- Devin Funchess, wide receiver for the NFL's Detroit Lions
- Tatiana Gutsu, two-time Olympic champion gymnast
- Kirsten Haglund, winner of Miss Michigan (2007) and Miss America (2008)
- Arthur Hanlon, Latin musician
- Al Jean, writer/producer, The Simpsons
- Bill Joy, co-founder of Sun Microsystems
- Meg Mallon, professional golfer in Hall of Fame
- Emily Morse, sex therapist
- Larry Nassar, osteopathic physician and convicted child molester
- Jaime Ray Newman, actress
- Eren Ozker, puppeteer, Muppeteer
- Austin Price (born 1995), basketball player in the Israeli Basketball Premier League
- Cayden Primeau, NHL hockey goaltender for the Montreal Canadiens
- Neal Rubin, columnist for The Detroit News
- Barry Sanders, Hall of Fame running back for the Detroit Lions; resident
- Martha Smith, model and actress, Miss July 1973 Playboy centerfold
- Drew Stanton, retired NFL quarterback who played for the Michigan State Spartans football team
- Tally Hall, indie rock band based in Ann Arbor
- Fred Toucher, Boston radio DJ for 98.5 The Sports Hub
- James Wolk, actor
- Brian S. Eifler, 11th Airborne Division commanding general
- CoryxKenshin, YouTuber (resides in Farmington Hills, but was born in Detroit).
- Megan Keller, current defensive player with PWHL Boston with two Olympic Appearances. 2026 Gold Medalist

== See also ==
- Farmington Community Library
- Farmington
- Metropolitan Detroit

== Sources ==
- Wilkins, Korie (December 19, 2006). "Merging Cities Debated". The Detroit Free Press. Archived from the original on March 26, 2007.
