= Brittany Luse =

American podcast host

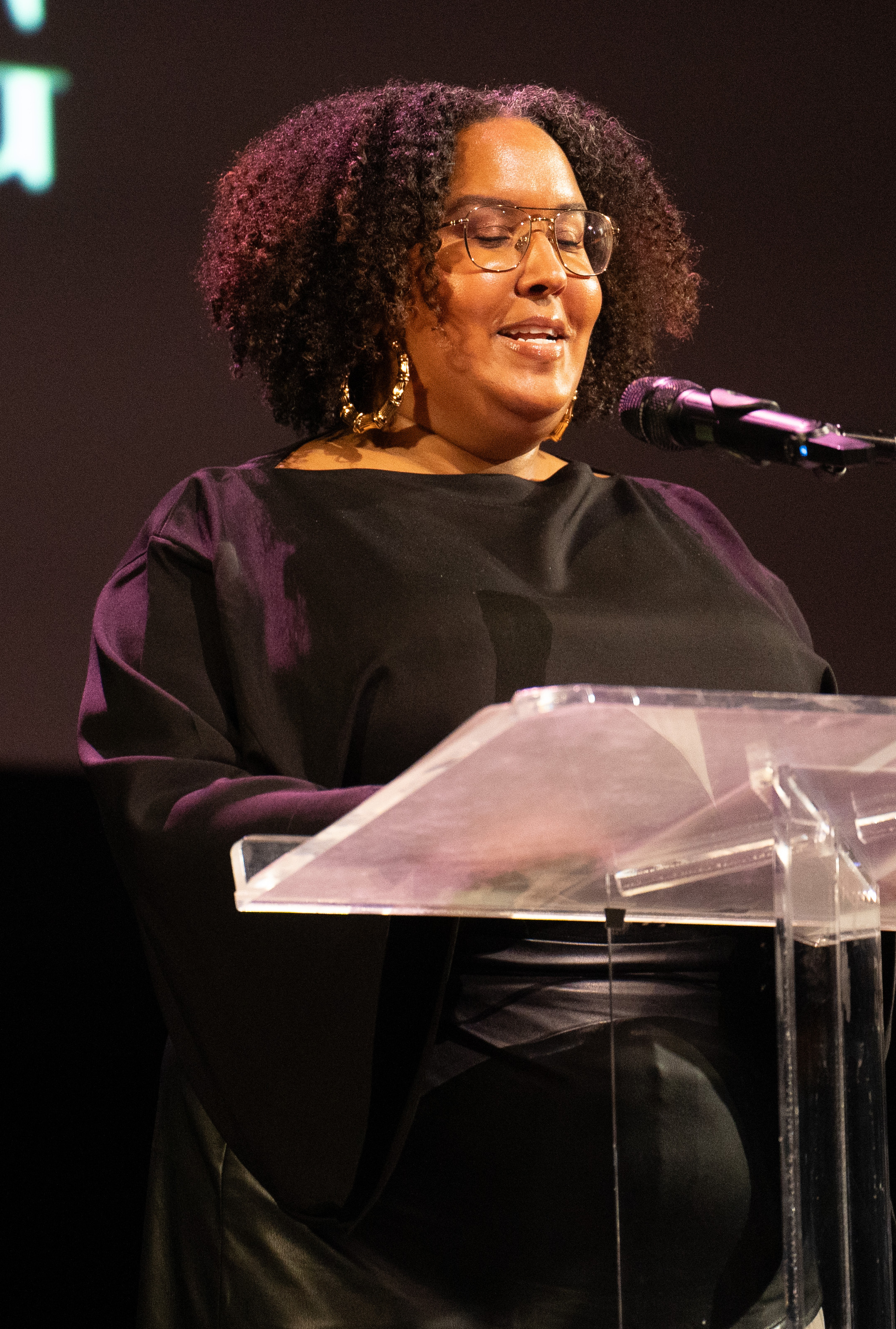
- Luse at the 2024 National Book Awards finalist reading
- Born: 1986 or 1987 (age 38–39)
- Education: Howard University
- Occupation: Podcast host
- Employer: NPR
- Known for: It's Been a Minute

Brittany Luse (born 1986 or 1987) is an American podcast host. In October 2022, she became the host of NPR's current events and culture podcast, It's Been a Minute. She previously hosted the podcasts For Colored Nerds and The Nod, both about Black culture, and Sampler, about other podcasts. In 2020, The Nod was adapted as a short-form video streaming show on Quibi.

== Early life and education ==
Luse was raised in Farmington Hills, Michigan by parents from Detroit who met at Cass Technical High School. Luse graduated from North Farmington High School in 2005 and then attended Howard University, where she studied film. In 2005 at Howard, Luse met her future For Colored Nerds and The Nod cohost Eric Eddings.

== Career ==
After college, Luse lived in Michigan, then New York City, where she worked in marketing. In 2013, Eddings suggested the pair start a podcast together. They independently produced and hosted For Colored Nerds, a Black culture podcast, from 2014 to 2017. It was featured as "New and Noteworthy" on the Apple Podcasts app in early 2015, and in September the podcast studio Gimlet Media hired Luse, who became the company's first Black employee. A few months later, Gimlet also hired Eddings.

In 2016, Luse hosted Sampler, a Gimlet podcast about other podcasts. The podcast was awarded Best Podcast in the Apps & Software category, during the 2016 Webby Awards. It was canceled in October 2016. Meanwhile, Eddings and Luse developed and pitched a new show on Black culture, and The Nod launched in July 2017. Reviewing it in The New Yorker, Sarah Larson said the show's weekly topics "hit the sweet spot between the non-obvious and the non-obscure. The show maintains a spirit of seriousness and playfulness that feels at once smart, listenable, interesting, and important." Despite critical praise, Luse and Eddings reported struggling to persuade Gimlet of the worth of the stories they were telling and said they faced questioning their white colleagues did not. Friction grew when they supported a drive to unionize, in which one goal was to improve conditions for people of color working at Gimlet; the effort met with antagonism from some peers.

The pair left the company in January 2020 and in March 2020 began appearing on a video streaming version of The Nod on the network Quibi. In Teen Vogue, Angie Jaime described the new eight-minute on-camera version as continuing the podcast's pursuit of "the diversity and richness of the Black experience" and offering "an endlessly captivating look at a culture that fuels so much of what is understood as pop culture".

After Quibi closed at the end of 2020, Luse and Eddings resumed For Colored Nerds in 2021, with co-producing by Stitcher. The weekly show continued to draw critical praise for selection of interesting topics and quality of discussion on them. CBC News said, "They dive into what's going on in the zeitgeist, and peel back the layers of Black culture that are rarely discussed in mixed company." In The New York Times, Reggie Ugwu described it as "a playfully erudite conversation show about hot topics in Black culture (the history of 'passing,' Lawrence from 'Insecure')". In Vulture, critic Nicholas Quah called Luse and Eddings major players in podcasting.

In October 2022, Luse replaced Sam Sanders as host of NPR's It's Been a Minute. The show focuses on culture and current events.

Luse has also performed with Pop-Up Magazine and written for Vulture and Harper's Bazaar.
