= North Farmington High School =

Public high school in Farmington Hills, Michigan, United States

Location
- 32900 West 13 Mile Road; Farmington Hills, Michigan 48334; United States; 42°30′52″N 83°22′33″W

Information
- Type: Public high school
- Opened: 1961
- School district: Farmington Public Schools
- Superintendent: Kelly Coffin
- CEEB code: 231406
- Principal: Crystal Ballard
- Faculty: 70.34 (on an FTE basis) basis
- Grades: 9 to 12
- Gender: coed
- Enrollment: 1,229 (2023–2024)
- Student to teacher ratio: 17.47
- Campus type: Small City Campus
- Colors: Brown and Gold
- Mascot: Sidney Raider (named after El Cid)
- Nickname: Raiders
- Website: nfhs.farmington.k12.mi.us

Student assessments
- 2021–22 school year Change vs. prior year

M-STEP 11th grade proficiency rates (Science / Social Studies)
- Advanced %: 13.6 / 14.6
- Proficient %: 13.6 / 21.1
- PR. Proficient %: 10.2 / 47.6
- Not Proficient %: 62.6 / 16.7

Average test scores
- SAT Total: 1001.4 (▼ −69.5)

North Farmington High School is a public high school located in Farmington Hills, Michigan, United States. The school was established in 1961 and educates a student body of approximately 1,250.

== History ==
In 1959, many homes in the Farmington Hills area were being built by families with older children, creating demand for a new junior and senior high school. The Board of Education put together a proposal asking voters to approve a $3 million bond for: the construction of a new junior-senior high school on a site at 13 Mile Road and Farmington Road, the construction of two new elementary schools, and the renovation of existing schools. the proposal was passed by voters and the outcome of the vote was 1,618 in favor and 1,276 opposed. In January 1960, the School Board appointed Harold Humble, an assistant principal at Farmington High School, to principal of the new school. The suggested name “Farmington Northern High,” was later changed to “North Farmington High School.”

It was not until the summer of 1960 that the architectural plans were approved for the new High School. As construction continued in January 1961, the School Board unanimously approved the proposed color scheme of “shades of brown and gold.” North Farmington High School opened on September 7, 1961, but lacked many needed supplies such as chalk boards. There were 598 students from grades 7–10 who attended that first day.

Students chose the name "Raiders" as their mascot but a personal identity was needed for the Raider, so the art class designed the original Raider logo that is still being used today and was named “El Cid.” As time went on, the Raider was increasingly referred to as the “Sidney Raider.” It is a school tradition for a student to anonymously dress up as Sidney, wearing the traditional NF cape, buccaneer hat, and Zorro-style mask, and attend high-profile North Farmington sports events in order to spark excitement in the crowd.

North Farmington is noted for its strong theater, music, art, and athletic programs. It also has a high level of alumni and community involvement, with fund raising efforts leading to the construction "Raider Plaza" at the athletic field, Holland Field. In addition to its two artificial turf fields and parquet gym floor, the school also features a performing arts wing, completed in 1999, that houses the Farmington Public Schools district television station, TV-10.

On September 8, 2008, the school hosted a campaign stop by Democratic presidential candidate Barack Obama. He spoke to a crowd of area voters in the school's gymnasium. During the town hall-style meeting, Mr. Obama announced to the audience that the 2009 Michigan Principal of the Year award was being awarded to then North Farmington principal Richard Jones.

On March 30, 2011, the school building was renamed the Richard B. Jones Academic Center in honor of the outgoing principal. Around the same time, the west wing of the school was dedicated and named the Dean and Sue Cobb Center for Media and the Performing Arts after two long-standing instructors.

== Notable alumni ==
- Elizabeth Berkley, 1990, actress. Primarily known for playing Jessie Spano on the TV series Saved by the Bell and playing Nomi Malone in the film Showgirls.
- Howard Birndorf, 1967, biotechnology entrepreneur and one of the founders of the biotech industry in San Diego, California.
- Pam Dawber 1968, actress. Played Mindy in the TV series Mork and Mindy.
- Jena Irene, 2014, singer. American Idol season 13 runner-up.
- Bill Joy, 1971, co-founder of Sun Microsystems. Known for the creation of Berkeley Unix (BSD), the vi text editor, and the Network File System (NFS).
- Brittany Luse, 2005, podcast host.
- Drew Mahalic, 1971, former NFL professional football player.
- Larry Nassar, 1981, convicted serial child molester who was the USA Gymnastics national team doctor and an osteopathic physician at Michigan State University.
- Matt Shepard, 1983, Detroit Tigers Play-By-Play Broadcaster.
- Andrew Wantuck, 1997, Producer of Tosh.0, The Jim Jefferies Show on Comedy Central and showrunner for NBC Sports.
- James Wolk, 2003, actor. Credits include Political Animals, You Again, Front of the Class, 'Lonestar and The Crazy Ones
- Megan Keller, 2014, defense for the Women's USA Hockey Team. Olympic gold and silver medalist.
- Brian S. Eifler, 1986, Lieutenant General (USA). Deputy Chief of Staff, G-1. United States Army

== Publications ==
The Northern Star is North Farmington's news magazine. It is published bi-monthly by the advanced journalism class and is sold for one dollar. In 2007, several newspaper staff members were selected by Michigan Interscholastic Press Association as Student Winners. The same year, the newspaper staff won a Spartan Award. The online edition of The Northern Star was awarded a Columbia University Silver Crown Award in 2011.
