= Harrison High School (Michigan) =

Former high school in Michigan, United States

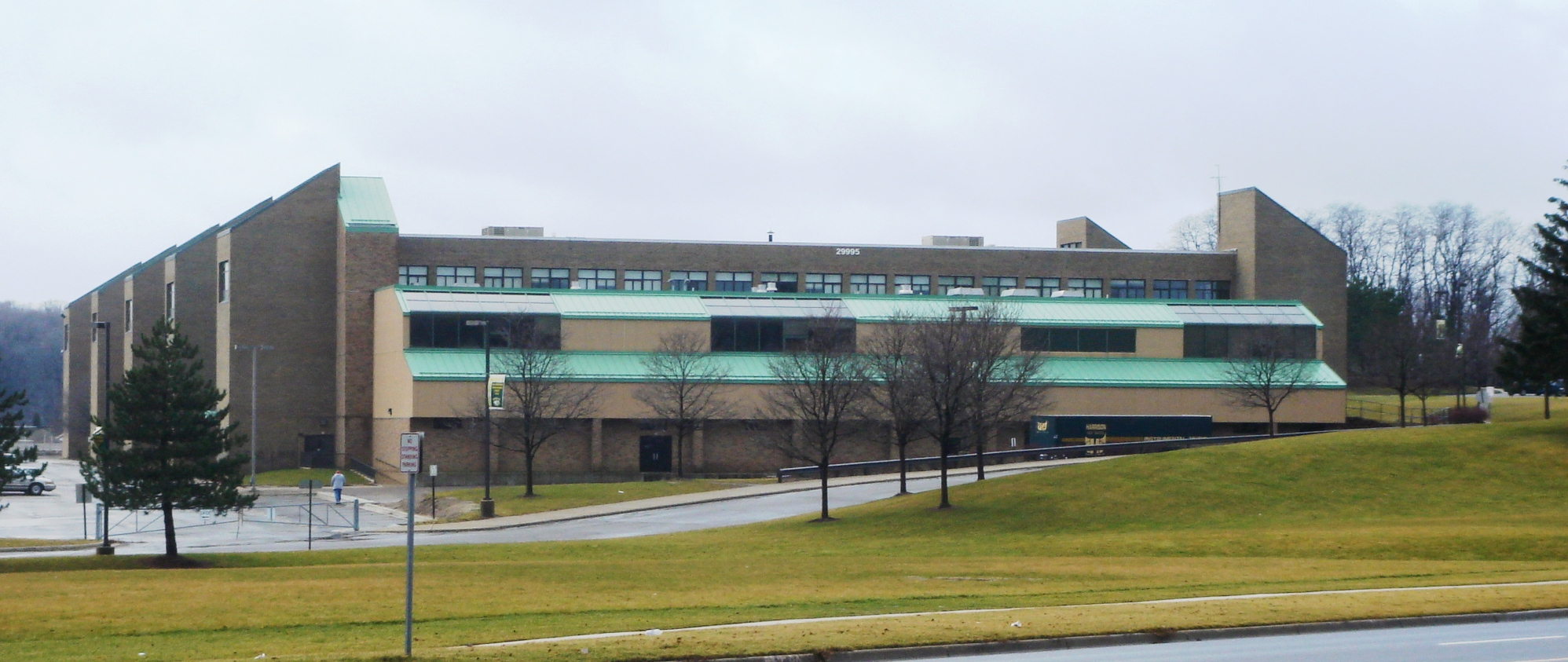

Location
- 29995 West 12 Mile Road; Farmington Hills, Michigan 48334; United States; 42°29′51″N 83°20′46″W

Information
- School type: Public
- Opened: 1970
- Closed: 2019
- School district: Farmington Public Schools
- Teaching staff: 46.11 (FTE)
- Grades: 9-12
- Enrollment: 597 (2018-19)
- Student to teacher ratio: 12.95
- Athletics conference: Oakland Activities Association
- Nickname: Hawks
- Newspaper: The Catalyst
- Yearbook: Retrospect
- Website: www.farmington.k12.mi.us/hhs/

Harrison High School (also known as Farmington Harrison) was a four-year secondary institution located in Farmington Hills, Michigan. It was part of the Farmington Public School District serving students from the cities of Farmington, Farmington Hills, and a portion of West Bloomfield Township.

The school closed in 2019, with the district citing declining enrollment. It was later sold to the City of Farmington Hills, which repurposed it as The Hawk Farmington Hills Community Center, named in tribute after the school's mascot.

== History ==
Harrison High School opened in September 1970 with Freshman, Sophomore and Junior classes. The Juniors were the first graduating class in June 1972. The school is named for Gerald V. Harrison who was superintendent of Farmington Public Schools from 1957 to 1967, a period of dramatic growth in the school district. Harrison was the third high school in the district, and the only one with a Freshman class.

In March 2016, the Farmington school board announced that the school was to close at the end of the 2018-2019 academic year, citing lower student populations in the city of Farmington Hills. The school building was purchased by the city and developed into a recreation and performing arts center named The Hawk in tribute to the school. Construction began in fall 2019 and the center opened on June 7, 2021.

== Academics ==
=== International Baccalaureate ===
Starting in the 2013-2014 school year, students had the opportunity to take IB classes at Harrison High School. Prior to this, students wishing to obtain an IB diploma had to attend the International Academy in Bloomfield Hills.

=== Test scores ===
The State of Michigan publishes the ACT test scores for all of the schools in the state. The scores for Harrison are as follows:

| School Year | Composite Score | English Score | Reading Score | Mathematics Score | Science Score | Number of Students Tested |
|---|---|---|---|---|---|---|
| 2014-2015 | 20.6 | 20.5 | 20.9 | 20.1 | 20.6 | 255 |
| 2013-2014 | 20.5 | 19.9 | 20.7 | 20.4 | 20.9 | 329 |
| 2012-2013 | 19.7 | 19.1 | 19.6 | 19.5 | 20.1 | 268 |
| 2011-2012 | 20.0 | 19.3 | 19.6 | 20.4 | 20.4 | 295 |
| 2010-2011 | 20.0 | 19.1 | 19.5 | 20.3 | 20.4 | 293 |
| 2009-2010 | 20.2 | 19.4 | 20.2 | 20.3 | 20.5 | 301 |
| 2008-2009 | 19.3 | 18.7 | 19.5 | 19.2 | 19.6 | 299 |
| 2007-2008 | 19.3 | 18.2 | 19.4 | 19.4 | 19.8 | 284 |
| 2006-2007 | 19.1 | 18.4 | 19.4 | 18.8 | 19.6 | 270 |

== Notable alumni ==
- Ricky Bryant (2000), former NFL wide receiver
- Aaron Burbridge, former NFL wide receiver
- Alex DeBrincat, right winger for the NHL’s Detroit Red Wings
- Devin Funchess (2012), tight end for the Detroit Lions
- Rod Heard II (2019), college football safety
- Al Jean, writer, show-runner for cartoon series The Simpsons
- Khalid Kareem (2016), defensive end for the Cincinnati Bengals and formerly Notre Dame
- Ovie Oghoufo (2018), college football defensive end
- Michael Ojemudia (2015), football player
- Jackie Salloum, filmmaker
- Drew Stanton (2002), former NFL quarterback for the Arizona Cardinals and Cleveland Browns
- Samantha Steckloff (2002), politician, member of the Michigan House of Representatives
