= Devin Funchess =

American football player (born 1994)

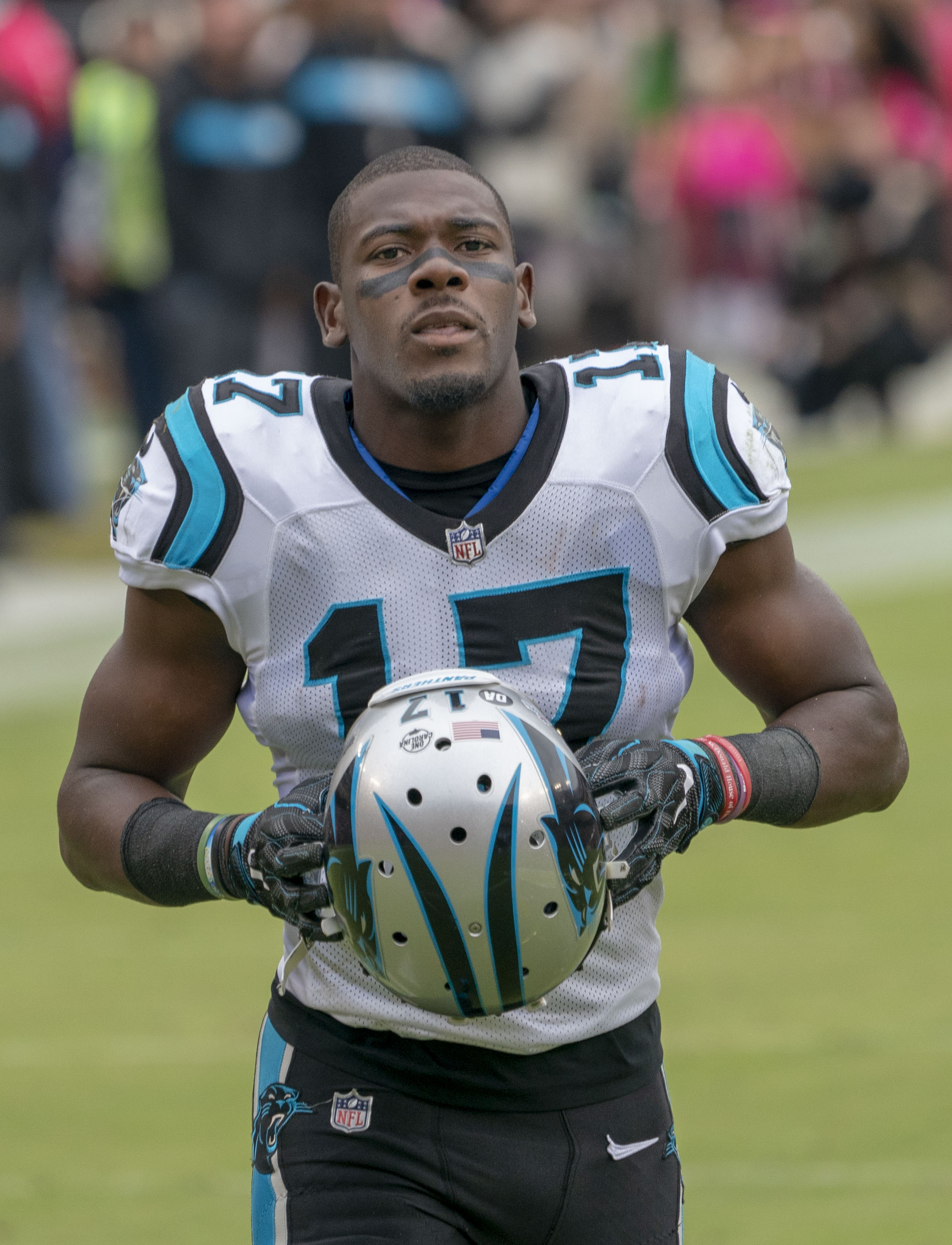
- Funchess with the Carolina Panthers in 2018

No. 17
- Position: Wide receiver

Personal information
- Born: May 21, 1994 (age 32); Detroit, Michigan, U.S.
- Listed height: 6 ft 4 in (1.93 m)
- Listed weight: 225 lb (102 kg)

Career information
- High school: Harrison (Farmington Hills, Michigan)
- College: Michigan (2012–2014)
- NFL draft: 2015: 2nd round, 41st overall pick

Career history
- Carolina Panthers (2015–2018); Indianapolis Colts (2019); Green Bay Packers (2020); San Francisco 49ers (2021)*; Detroit Lions (2022)*
- * Offseason or practice squad member only

Awards and highlights
- Big Ten Tight End of the Year (2013); 2× Second-team All-Big Ten (2013, 2014)

Career NFL statistics
- Receptions: 164
- Receiving yards: 2,265
- Receiving touchdowns: 21
- Stats at Pro Football Reference

Other information
- Basketball career

Free agent
- Position: Small forward / shooting guard

Personal information
- Born: May 21, 1994 (age 32) Detroit, Michigan, U.S.
- Listed height: 6 ft 4 in (1.93 m)
- Listed weight: 225 lb (102 kg)

Career information
- High school: Harrison (Farmington Hills, Michigan)
- Playing career: 2024–present

Career history
- 2023: Statham Academy
- 2024: Caribbean Storm Islands

Devin Akeem Funchess (born May 21, 1994) is an American former professional football player who was a wide receiver in the National Football League (NFL). He played college football for the Michigan Wolverines as a tight end, and was selected by the Carolina Panthers in the second round of the 2015 NFL draft. He was also a member of the Indianapolis Colts, Green Bay Packers, San Francisco 49ers and Detroit Lions. After his football career, he played professional basketball for the Caribbean Storm Islands of the Baloncesto Profesional Colombiano.

== Early life ==
Devin Akeem Funchess attended Harrison High School in Farmington Hills, where he was a three-sport athlete in football, basketball and track. As a junior in 2010, he caught 34 passes for 709 yards and five touchdowns, leading his team to the Michigan Division II state championship. As a senior in 2011, he was named to the Detroit News Blue Chip List after tallying 21 receptions for 452 yards and five touchdowns on offense, while also recording three sacks, one forced fumble, one interception, and three pass break-ups on defense. In track & field, Funchess competed as a long jumper, recording a personal-best leap of 5.53 meters (18 ft, 1.5 in) at the 2011 Oakland County Championships, where he placed 25th.

Considered a four-star recruit by ESPN.com, Funchess was listed as the fifth-ranked tight end in the nation in 2012.

College recruiting
Name	Hometown	School	Height	Weight	Commit date
Devin Funchess; TE	Farmington Hills, MI	Harrison HS	6 ft 5 in (1.96 m)	205 lb (93 kg)	Apr 22, 2011
Devin Funchess; TE	Recruit ratings: Scout: Rivals: 247Sports: ESPN:				
Overall recruit ranking: Scout: 8 (TE) Rivals: 14 (TE) 247Sports: 10 (TE) ESPN: 5 (TE)
Note: In many cases, Scout, Rivals, 247Sports, On3, and ESPN may conflict in their listings of height and weight.; In these cases, the average was taken. ESPN grades are on a 100-point scale.; Sources: "2012 Team Ranking". Rivals.com.

== College career ==
Funchess committed to the University of Michigan in 2011, becoming one of the top prospects in Michigan's 2012 recruiting class.

=== 2012 season ===
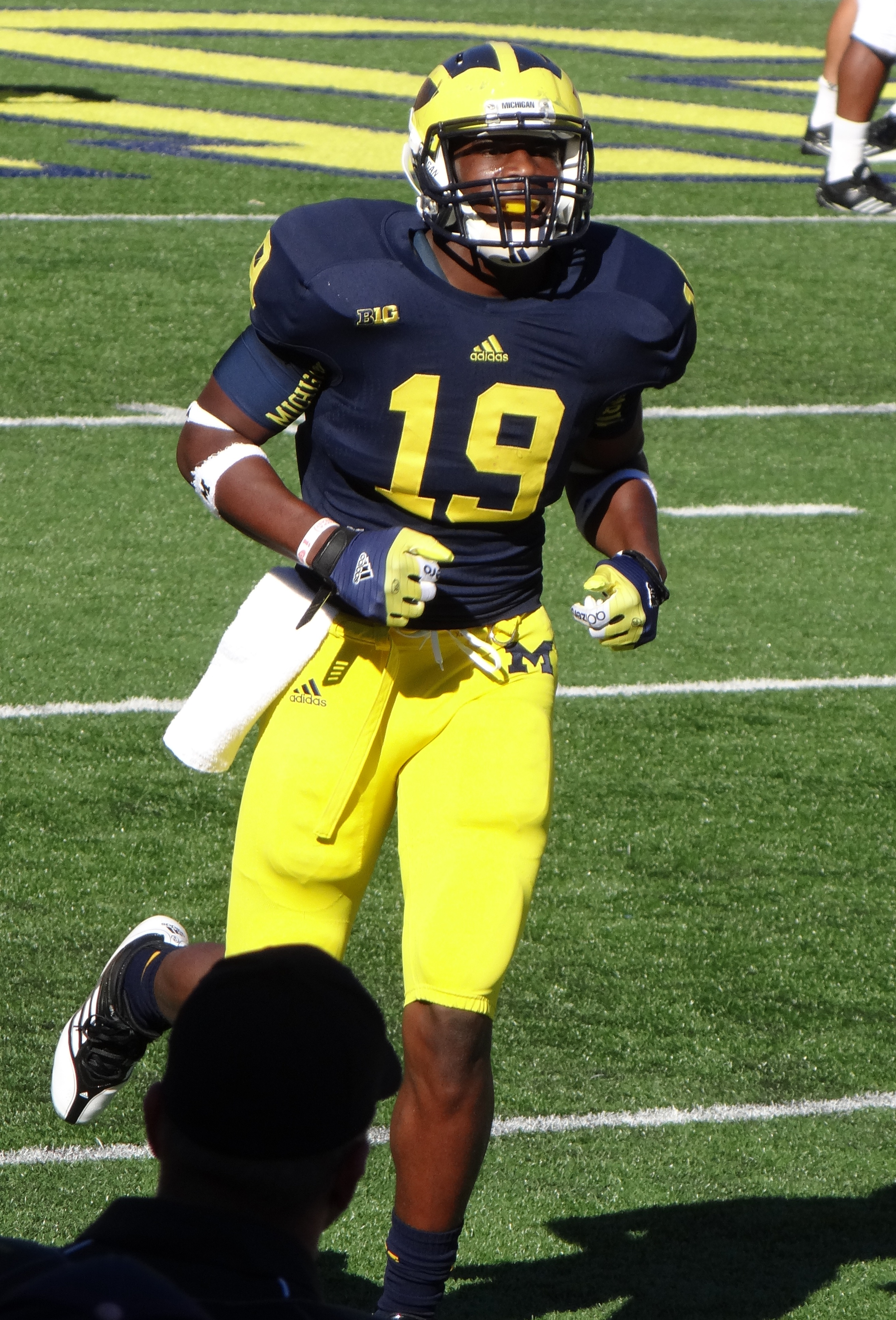
Funchess playing for Michigan in 2012.

Funchess saw extensive playing time as a freshman for the 2012 Michigan football team. After Brandon Moore sustained a knee injury, Funchess became the team's leading tight end and was described in October 2012 as "one of Michigan's biggest early-season revelations." In the second game of the season, and Funchess' first as a starter, he had 106 receiving yards and a touchdown against Air Force. He became the first Michigan tight end with 100 receiving yards in a game in 15 years; Jerame Tuman accomplished the feat in 1997. Funchess was named the Big Ten Conference Freshman of the Week for his performance against Air Force. Against UMass the following week, he caught two passes for 34 yards and scored his second career touchdown at Michigan.

Funchess scored his third touchdown pass on October 13, 2012, in a 45–0 victory over Illinois. On November 10, 2012, he scored in the fourth quarter on an eight-yard pass from Devin Gardner to give Michigan a 28–24 lead over Northwestern. In the final home game of the season, a 42–17 victory over Iowa, Funchess scored his fifth touchdown on a 29-yard pass from Gardner.

Funchess was a 2012 All-Big Ten honorable mention selection by the media. He was also named to the Football Writers Association of America Freshman All-America Team.

=== 2013 season ===
As a sophomore for the 2013 Michigan team, Funchess became the Wolverines' second leading receiver behind Jeremy Gallon. On October 5, 2013, he caught seven passes for 151 yards against Minnesota. He had a 46-yard reception against the Golden Gophers, and his total of 151 yards was also a career-high. After the Minnesota game, head coach Brady Hoke said: "We wanted to get him out on the perimeter a little bit, mismatch in a lot of ways. He runs awful well and is a big target. We're just trying to really take advantage of his skill set." In an overtime loss to Penn State on October 12, 2013, Funchess caught four passes for 112 yards and two touchdowns, including a career-long 59-yard touchdown reception. Through the first six games of the season, Funchess had 19 catches for 408 yards and four touchdowns. His average of 21.5 yards per catch was the highest in the Big Ten Conference.

After the 2013 season, Funchess was named as Big Ten's Tight End of the year.

=== 2014 season ===
On August 30, 2014, Funchess played his first game as a wide receiver for the Wolverines. He changed his number from No. 87 to No. 1; he is the first receiver to wear No. 1 since Braylon Edwards in 2004. Funchess tallied seven receptions for 95 yards and a career-high three touchdowns in the season opener against Appalachian State. On December 9, 2014, Funchess announced that he would be forgoing his remaining eligibility and declared for the 2015 NFL draft.

=== College statistics ===
Receiving
Year	Team	Games	Rec	Yds	Avg	TDs
2012	Michigan	13	15	234	15.6	5
2013	Michigan	13	49	748	15.3	6
2014	Michigan	11	62	733	11.8	4
Total		37	126	1,715	13.6	15

== Professional football career ==
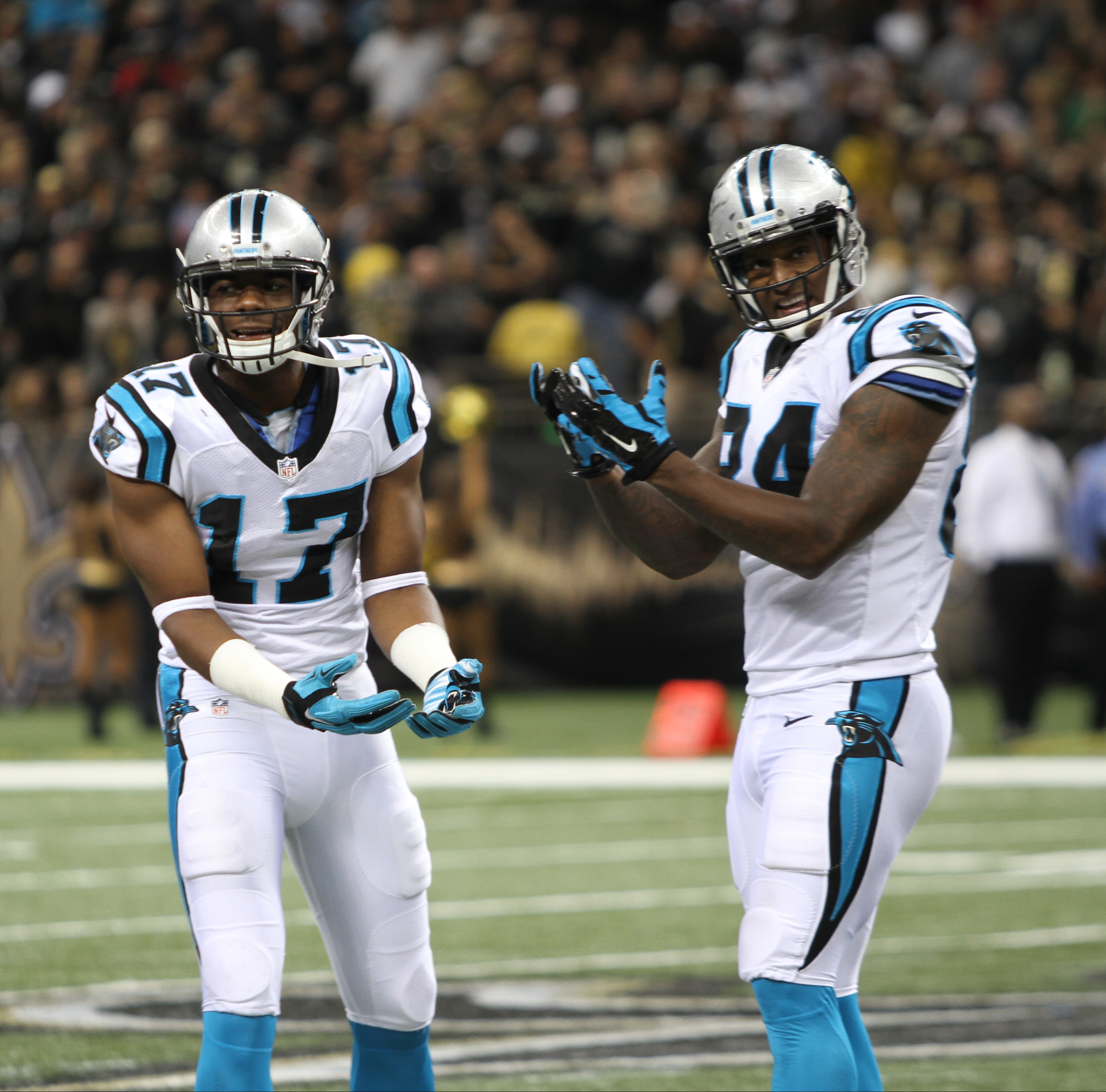
Funchess and tight end Ed Dickson playing for the Panthers in 2015.

Pre-draft measurables
Height	Weight	Arm length	Hand span	40-yard dash	10-yard split	20-yard split	20-yard shuttle	Three-cone drill	Vertical jump	Broad jump	Bench press
6 ft 4 1/4 in (1.94 m)	232 lb (105 kg)	33 1/2 in (0.85 m)	9 3/4 in (0.25 m)	4.70 s	1.66 s	2.74 s	4.48 s	6.98 s	38 1/2 in (0.98 m)	10 ft 2 in (3.10 m)	17 reps
All values from NFL Combine and Pro Day

=== Carolina Panthers ===
==== 2015 season ====
Funchess was selected in the second round with the 41st overall pick by the Carolina Panthers in the 2015 NFL draft. On August 14, 2015, he made his preseason debut for the Panthers against the Buffalo Bills. Funchess's first catch was a 34-yarder where he tightroped the sideline on a pass from Derek Anderson. Funchess had one more catch, and finished the night with 53 yards total. When the Panthers' primary receiver, Kelvin Benjamin, suffered a torn ACL in training camp, Carolina looked for Funchess to help fill that spot and emerge as a consistent target for Cam Newton.

Funchess had a breakout game during Week 9 against the Green Bay Packers; Funchess made three catches for 71 yards and a key touchdown to help the Panthers earn their first 8–0 start in franchise history. The following week, Funchess caught both of his targets for a total of 41 yards during the Panthers' 27–10 victory over the Tennessee Titans. The following week, Funchess made his first NFL start against the Washington Redskins and responded with four receptions for 64 yards and a touchdown during the Panthers' 44–16 victory. During the Panthers' 41–38 victory over the New Orleans Saints, Funchess recorded a key 13-yard touchdown reception. During the Panthers' 38–35 victory over the New York Giants to move them to 14–0, Funchess recorded a key touchdown reception against cornerback Dominique Rodgers-Cromartie. Against the Tampa Bay Buccaneers during the regular season finale, Funchess set career bests with seven receptions and 120 yards. The yardage is the second-most by Panthers' rookie (David Gettis had 125 yards against the San Francisco 49ers on October 24, 2010). Funchess finished the regular season with 31 catches for 473 yards, the fifth most in franchise history for a rookie receiver; his five touchdown catches were second most for a rookie.

On February 7, 2016, Funchess was part of the Panthers team that played in Super Bowl 50. The Panthers fell to the Denver Broncos by a score of 24–10. In the Super Bowl, Funchess had two catches for 40 yards.

==== 2016 season ====
Funchess played in 15 games in 2016, with seven starts, recording 23 catches for 371 yards and four touchdowns. He was placed on injured reserve on December 29, 2016, after suffering a knee injury against the Falcons in Week 16.

==== 2017 season ====
Funchess was part of a Panthers' wide receiver unit that contained Kelvin Benjamin, Russell Shephard, Curtis Samuel, Kaelin Clay, and Damiere Byrd. In Week 4, against the New England Patriots, he had seven receptions for 70 yards and two touchdowns in the 33–30 victory. In Week 12, against the New York Jets, he had a season-high 108 receiving yards on seven receptions. Overall, on the season, he had 63 receptions for 840 yards and eight touchdowns. The Panthers made the playoffs and faced off against the Saints in the Wild Card Round. In the 31–26 loss, he had four receptions for 89 yards.

==== 2018 season ====
In a Week 3 victory over the Cincinnati Bengals, Funchess scored his first receiving touchdown of the season. In Week 6 and Week 8, he scored a touchdown in consecutive games against the Redskins and Philadelphia Eagles. He finished the 2018 season with 44 receptions for 549 receiving yards and four receiving touchdowns.

=== Indianapolis Colts ===
On March 14, 2019, Funchess signed a one-year contract with the Indianapolis Colts. He was placed on injured reserve with a broken collarbone on September 10, 2019. He was designated for return from injured reserve on November 13, 2019, and began practicing with the team again. However, he was not activated by the end of the three-week practice window on December 4, 2019, and remained on injured reserve for the rest of the season.

=== Green Bay Packers ===
==== 2020 season ====
On April 2, 2020, Funchess signed with the Packers The deal was reportedly for one year with a $1.2 million base salary for the 2020 season and a $1 million signing bonus, and could be worth up to $6.25 million with bonuses and incentives.

On July 28, 2020, Funchess opted out of the 2020 NFL season due to the COVID-19 pandemic. He explained his decision in an Instagram post, saying that some of his closest family members had been exposed to COVID-19 and that he was opting out for their safety, as well as his own.

==== 2021 season ====
On March 9, 2021, the NFL Network announced that Funchess had agreed to take a $750,000 pay cut to remain with the salary cap-strapped Packers. In August 2021, Funchess created racial controversy by using an anti-Asian racial slur "chinky/chinkie" and made a “slant-eyed” gesture during a press conference. Funchess later posted an apology on Twitter.

On August 25, the Packers placed Funchess on injured reserve due to a lingering hamstring injury, and released him two days later.

=== San Francisco 49ers ===
On November 24, 2021, Funchess was signed to the practice squad of the San Francisco 49ers. He was released on December 6.

=== Detroit Lions ===
On June 14, 2022, Funchess signed with the Detroit Lions as a tight end. He was released on August 30.

== Professional basketball career ==
On December 20, 2022, Funchess said that as his football career options were dwindling, he was switching his focus and training to basketball so that he can fulfill his childhood dream of playing in the NBA.

On November 3, 2023, Funchess made his professional basketball debut, recording ten points and seven rebounds for Statham Academy during a 2023 AsiaBasket Dasmariñas Championship game held in Dasmariñas, Cavite, Philippines.

On April 22, 2024, Funchess signed his first professional basketball contract with the Caribbean Storm of the Basketball League of Colombia.

== NFL career statistics ==
=== Regular season ===
Year	Team	Games		Receiving					Fumbles	
Year	Team	GP	GS	Rec	Yards	Avg	Lng	TD	Fum	Lost
2015	CAR	16	5	31	473	15.3	52	5	1	1
2016	CAR	15	7	23	371	16.1	48	4	0	0
2017	CAR	16	16	63	840	13.3	44	8	0	0
2018	CAR	14	12	44	549	12.5	27	4	0	0
2019	IND	1	1	3	32	10.7	16	0	0	0
2020	GB	0	0	Did not play due to COVID-19 opt-out						
Career		62	41	164	2,265	13.8	52	21	1	1

=== Postseason ===
Year	Team	Games		Receiving					Fumbles	
Year	Team	GP	GS	Rec	Yards	Avg	Lng	TD	Fum	Lost
2015	CAR	3	3	5	73	14.6	24	1	0	0
2017	CAR	1	1	4	79	19.8	24	0	0	0
2020	GB	0	0	Did not play due to Covid-19 opt-out						
Career		4	4	9	152	16.9	24	1	0	0
