= Nissan AZEAL =

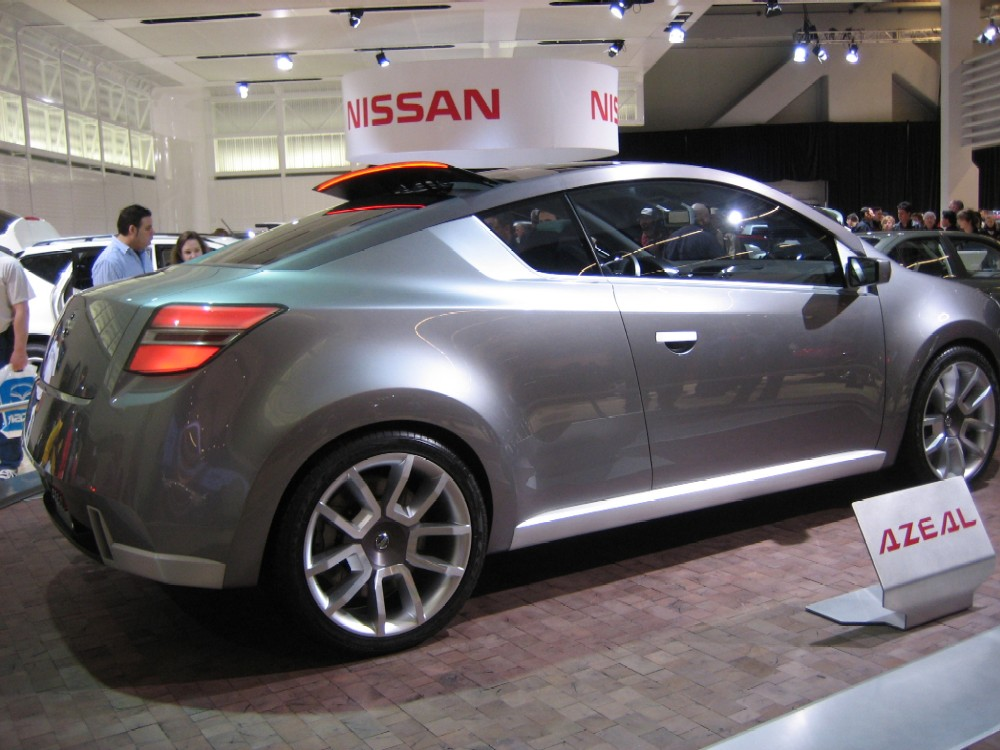
- The Nissan AZEAL on display at the 2006 Montreal International Auto Show

Overview
- Manufacturer: Nissan
- Production: 2006
- Designer: Ken Lee; David Wong

Body and chassis
- Class: Concept car
- Body style: 2-door fastback coupe
- Layout: Front-engine, front-wheel drive

Powertrain
- Engine: 2.5 L turbocharged 4-cylinder
- Transmission: 6-speed manual

The Nissan AZEAL was a sports concept car manufactured by Nissan and first released to the public at the 2005 North American International Auto Show. The concept was aimed to the young drivers.

== Features and specifications ==
The AZEAL features trendy gadgetry, like an integrated cell phone and an MP3 player. The car's stated goals were to place emphasis on personality and aggressive styling as well as blend affordability with desirability. Penned by designers Ken Lee and David Wong, it was the first Nissan to come out of its new Farmington Hills, Michigan (Metro Detroit) design centre.

The AZEAL has a turbocharged 2.5-litre, 4-cylinder engine with a 6-speed manual transmission equipped with a limited-slip differential and front-wheel drive. No further information on the car has been released by Nissan. Exterior features of the AZEAL include 19" aluminum-alloy wheels, dual exhaust pipes, side skirts and a spoiler topped off with glass roof panels like those found in the Nissan Maxima and Nissan Quest. Much of the exterior design for AZEAL went into the production version of 2007 Nissan Sentra.
