= Farmington Public Schools (Michigan) =

School district in Michigan

Address
- 32500 Shiawassee Rd Farmington, Oakland, Michigan, 48336; United States

District information
- Type: Public School System
- Grades: Early Childhood - Adult Education
- Established: 1949
- Superintendent: Kelly Coffin
- Budget: $202,073,000 2022-2023 expenditures
- NCES District ID: 2614070

Students and staff
- Students: 9,110 (2024-25)
- Teachers: 629.35 FTE (2024-2025)
- Staff: 1,310.16 FTE (2024-25)
- Student–teacher ratio: 14.48

Other information
- Website: www.farmington.k12.mi.us

Farmington Public Schools is a public school district in Metro Detroit in the U.S. state of Michigan, serving Farmington, most of Farmington Hills, and a small portion of West Bloomfield. As of the 2023–2024 school year, the district served 9,154 students.

== History ==
=== Farmington Junior High School ===
Union School, built by Nathan Power in 1888 at 33000 Thomas Street in Farmington, was the first brick school in the area. It sat directly on the northwest corner of School Street and Thomas Street. On this site several school buildings would be built over the next 70 years.

The union school, which housed all grades, was overcrowded by 1915, and a high school was built directly west of it in 1916. On January 10, 1918, the Union School burned down. The high school was undamaged in the fire. It was replaced that year by a school on the same site. Connected by a second-story passageway, the 1916 and 1918 buildings became Farmington's high school until 1953. It became a junior high then.

A new junior high was built on the site in 1958, connected to the 1918 building by an enclosed bridge. The 1916 building was torn down to accommodate the new school. The 1918 building was called the "old east wing" until being demolished in 1979. The junior high school closed in 1976 and the building was used for various purposes by the district before being sold. Then known as the Maxfield Training Center, it was demolished in 2024.

=== Consolidation and Growth ===
The consolidation of the eight small school districts in Farmington Township occurred on November 27, 1944. The districts were Thayer, Fairview, Farmington City and Township District, West Farmington, Nichols, Bond, German, and Noble. The new, larger district was called Farmington Township Schools and is today known by its present name.

In 2016 the district stopped the use of upper-elementary schools (schools teaching fifth and sixth grade) and reverted to using traditional elementary and middle schools, in the process it made Power and Warner Upper-elementaries into middle schools. Also in 2016, Highmeadow Common Campus was closed, and the students and teachers were transferred to the new Farmington STEAM Academy, housed in the building formerly used by O.E. Dunckel Middle school.

The population of Farmington Township grew from 26,692 in 1960 to 83,986 in 2020 (as the city of Farmington Hills). But school district enrollment dropped by 2,923 students between the 2002-2003 and 2018-2019 school years, leading to the closure of Harrison High School in 2019.

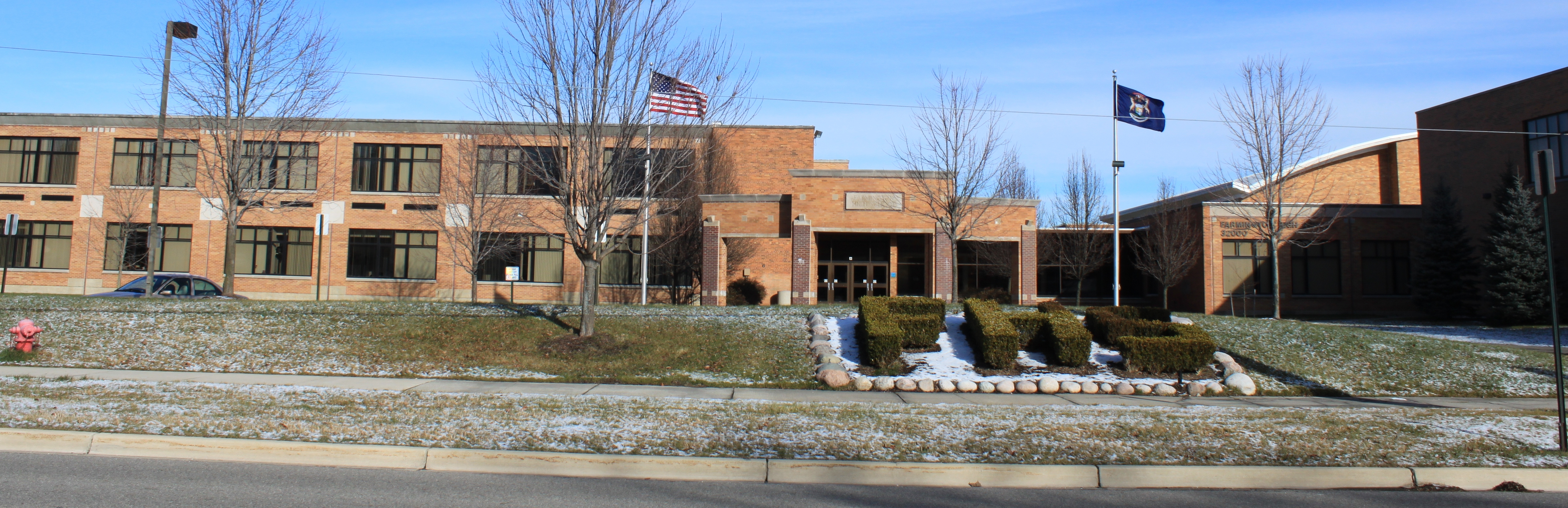
Farmington High School

== Schools ==
High Schools
School	Address	Built
Farmington High School	32000 Shiawassee St., Farmington	1953
North Farmington High School	32900 W. 13 Mile Rd., Farmington Hills	1961
Farmington Central High School (alternative high school)	30175 Highmeadow Rd., Farmington Hills	1963 as Highmeadow Elementary

Middle Schools
School	Address	Built
East Middle School	25000 Middlebelt Rd., Farmington Hills	1963
Power Middle School	34740 Rhonswood St., Farmington Hills	1968
Warner Middle School	30303 W 14 Mile Rd., Farmington Hills	1973

K-8 Schools
School	Address	Built
Farmington STEAM Academy	32800 W 12 Mile Rd., Farmington Hills	1957

Elementary Schools
School	Address	Built
Beechview Elementary School	26850 Westmeath Ct., Farmington Hills	1961
Forest Elementary School	34545 Old Timber Rd., Farmington Hills	1967
Gill Elementary School	21195 Gill Rd., Farmington Hills	1955
Hillside Elementary School	36801 W 11 Mile Rd., Farmington Hills	1990
Kenbrook Elementary School	32130 Bonnet Hill Dr., Farmington Hills	1958
Lanigan Elementary School (formerly Larkshire Elementary)	23800 Tuck Rd., Farmington Hills	1965 as Larkshire Elementary
Longacre Elementary School	34850 Arundel St., Farmington	1959
Wood Creek Elementary School	28400 Harwich Dr., Farmington Hills	1970

Preschools
School	Address	Built
Farmington Early Childhood Center	32400 Alameda St., Farmington Hills	1959 as Alameda Elementary

Post-secondary schools
School	Address	Built
Visions Unlimited	30415 Shiawassee Rd., Farmington	1955 as Shiawassee Elementary

== Former schools ==
School	Address	Opened	Closed	Notes
Isaac Bond Elementary School	31500 W 13 Mile Road, Farmington Hills	1924	1974	
Cloverdale Elementary School	33000 Freedom Road, Farmington	1958	2016	repurposed as the new central office building effective Aug. 2024
O.E. Dunckel Middle School	32800 W 12 Mile Road, Farmington Hills	1957	2017	repurposed as Farmington STEAM Academy
Eagle Elementary School	29410 W 14 Mile Road, West Bloomfield	1955	2010	demolished; housing built on site
Fairview Community School	28500 Oakcrest Court, Farmington Hills	1966	2006	
Farmington Junior High School	33300 Thomas Street, Farmington	1919		became Farmington Training Center in 1958; later renamed Maxfield Training Center; abandoned; sold to City of Farmington in 2019, then to developers in 2024; slated for demolition
Flanders Elementary School	32600 Flanders Street, Farmington	1962	2010	demolished 2011
Harrison High School	29995 W 12 Mile Road, Farmington Hills	1970	2019	sold to City of Farmington Hills; repurposed as recreation center, which opened in 2021
Highmeadow Common Campus	30175 Highmeadow Road, Farmington Hills	1963	2017	established as Highmeadow Elementary; became Lutheran school in 1980; returned to FPS in 1987; became Common Campus in 1988; moved to Farmington STEAM Academy in 2017; building repurposed as relocated Farmington Central High School
Middlebelt Elementary School	22400 Middlebelt Road, Farmington Hills	1949	1983	repurposed as senior living community in 1987
Ten Mile Elementary School	32789 W 10 Mile Road, Farmington Hills	1949	1987	became Adult Education Center in 1978; repurposed as district offices and later renamed Maxfield Education Center
William Grace Elementary School	29040 Shiawassee Road, Farmington Hills	1957	2010	demolished; dog park established on site in 2012
Wooddale Elementary School	28600 Peppermill Road, Farmington Hills	1958	2010	

== Athletic honors ==
Harrison High School football coach John Herrington and the Harrison Hawks football team was honored by Nike for having one of the top 50 football programs in the country.
