= Zekelman Holocaust Center =

Holocaust museum in the United States

Coordinates: 42.5024°N 83.3590°W

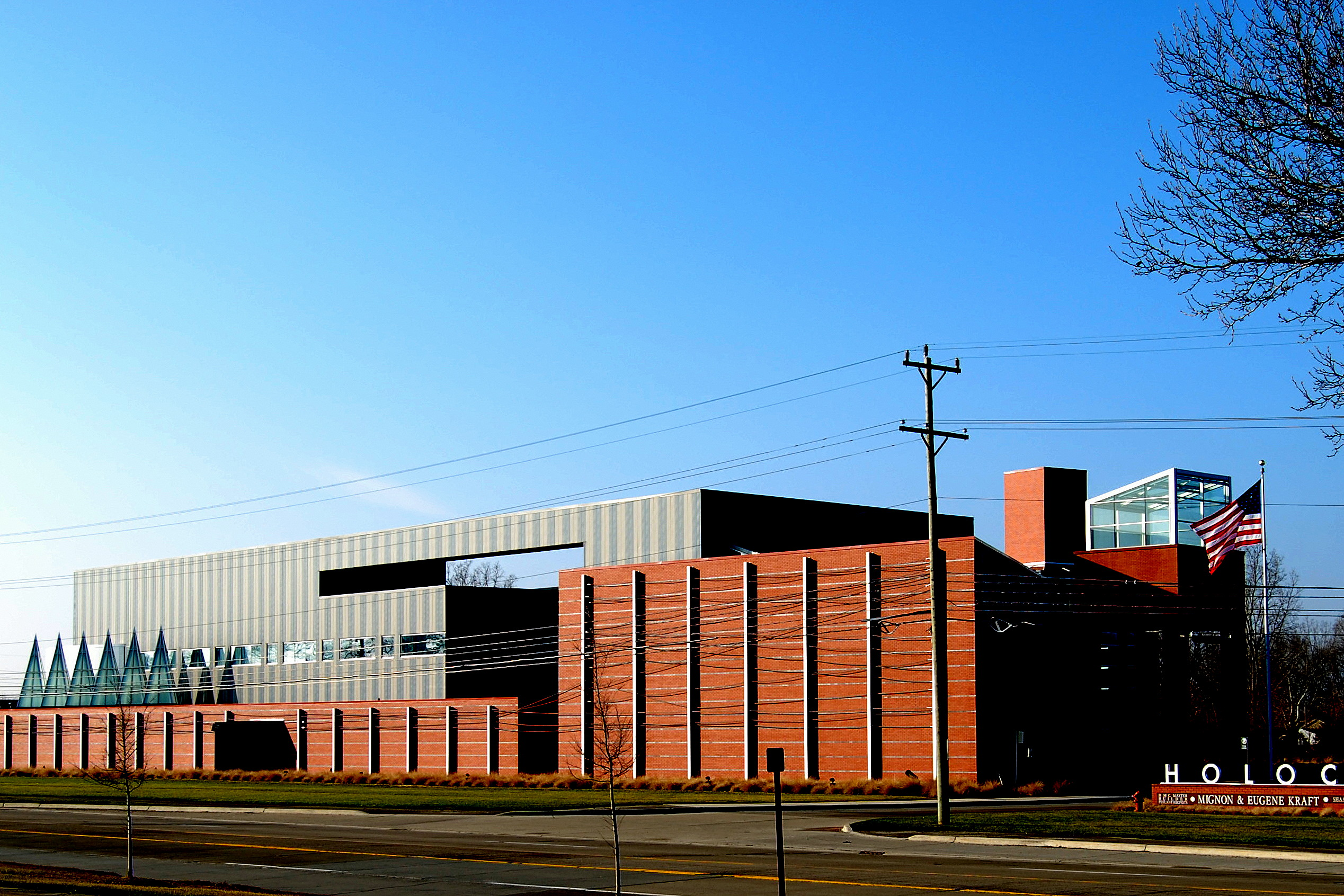
New Holocaust Memorial Center

The Holocaust Memorial Center in Farmington Hills, Michigan, near Detroit, is Michigan's largest Holocaust museum.

== History ==
The Zekelman Holocaust Center, founded as the Holocaust Memorial Center (The HC), the first free-standing institution of its kind in the United States, was founded by CEO Rabbi Charles H. Rosenzveig with his fellow members of Shaarit Haplaytah ("the Remnant," survivors of the Holocaust). It took nearly twenty years of planning and grassroots fundraising before Shaarit Haplaytah was ready to build. Ground was broken for the Holocaust Memorial Center on the property of the Jewish Community Campus at Maple and Drake Roads in West Bloomfield, Michigan, on December 6, 1981. Almost three years later, in October 1984, the HC was dedicated and opened. When the organization outgrew its original location, it built a new museum on the grounds of the Old Orchard Theatre on Orchard Lake Road in Farmington Hills. The Center's new design received front-page coverage in the Wall Street Journal, with a headline asking, "Should a Museum Look as Disturbing as What it Portrays?". Since its inception, the HC has been visited by more than one million visitors from all over the world. Tens of thousands of schoolchildren tour the museum each year and speak with a survivor of the Holocaust.

Rabbi Rosenzveig died on December 11, 2008, in Royal Oak, Michigan, at Beaumont Hospital as the result of heart failure. Steve Goldman served as CEO from 2009 until his retirement in February 2016, at which time he was succeeded by Rabbi Eli Mayerfeld.

The expansion on the new site consists of an expanded Holocaust Center and two new museums, designed by Neumann/Smith Architecture.

The Holocaust Memorial Center was renamed The Zekelman Holocaust Center in January 2022, recognizing $25 million of family donations.

=== Mission ===
The Holocaust Memorial Center's stated mission is to "engage, educate, and empower by remembering the Holocaust. In doing so, the Memorial Center engages in a number of community activities, hosts tours for public schools, universities, institutions and interested tour groups, curates an expansive library archive and a gallery dedicated to art and historical exhibits, hosts educational programs for different age groups, and curates eleven core exhibits across its vast space. The HC combats antisemitism through education and through its dedication to survivors and the active struggle of the global Jewish community during rise of Nazi Germany, the Holocaust, and well after the collapse of the Nazi Regime. By focusing on survivor stories and the history of this struggle, the HC educates visitors so that they understand the historical context of the Holocaust and how it happened. The HC also does not use verbiage such as, "Jews killed," when referring to the victims of the Holocaust, and instead uses the phrasing, "murdered," as it emphasizes the violent and anti-Semitic intention of the perpetrators.

== Exhibitions ==
=== The Eternal Flame and Memorial Wall ===
The Holocaust Memorial Center maintains a flame burning at all times directly following and to the left of the entrance. This flame honors the memories and lives of the victims of the Holocaust. "In Jewish practice, a twenty-four hour candle is lit on the anniversary of the death of a parent or child," and because there is often no grave or date of anniversary for the lost, the flame burns for them at all hours of the day. The Eternal Flame is flanked on both sides by the Memorial Wall, which names the concentration and extermination camps that served as the unmarked graves of the innocents murdered in the Holocaust. The wall reads "These do I remember and for them my soul weeps," listing Auschwitz, Babi Yar, Belzec, Bergen-Belsen, Breendonck, Buchenwald, Chelmno, Dachau, Drancy, Jasenovac, Klooga, Lwow-Janowska, Majdanek, Mauthausen, Ponary, and Ravensbruck. The following connected wall veers right, with etchings of different nations across Europe and Africa with the number of Jews murdered in each below. The top right corner of the wall reads, "The number of Jews murdered under Nazi direction in the different countries of Europe. The total number of Jews that died in Ghettos, Concentration Camps, Mobile Gas Units, Mass Murders, and Exterminations in Gas Chambers is...6,258,484."

=== The Boxcar ===
Part of the Henrietta and Alvin Weisberg Gallery, The Boxcar is the largest curated historical artifact in the HC. It is the first exhibit that visitors will see as they enter, and stands to the immediate right of the entrance, accompanied by information which emphasizes the historical significance of the boxcar in the history of the Holocaust. The WWII-era boxcar was used to transport Jewish peoples and other peoples which the Nazis deemed undesirable during the perpetration of the Final Solution. The signage in front of the boxcar's opening reads, "Werkstattwagen Nr. [mobile workshop car No.] 4050 942 0784-3 was used by the Nazis during the Holocaust to transport Jews and other prisoners to the killing centers. Sometimes more than 100 people were stuffed into without food. These "passengers" were ticketed by the SS, who paid the Reichsbahn [railroad] for transportation - receiving a credit because the fare was one-way." Surrounding the boxcar is architecture implemented to give the likeness of the Hannoverscher Bahnhof station in Hamburg, Germany, where victims would have been transported from. The visual and audio exhibit on the wall to the left describes the cobblestone streets of the Warsaw Ghetto, and the Umschlagplatz, or transfer point, which Jews would be forced to gather on. The cramped space of the boxcar and street intend to exemplify the lack of space and inhumane treatment of those transported, accompanied by the signage which emphasizes this treatment, the mechanization and processes of the Holocaust, and the idea of this being a one way journey to a final destination.

=== Museum of European Jewish Heritage ===
The Museum of European Jewish Heritage, the largest gallery in the HC's Core Exhibit, provides visitors with a view of Jewish life in Europe before the Holocaust. The exhibit leads with a circular room, directly to the left of The Boxcar exhibit. Beginning at the right and circling around is a catalog of global Jewish history, from 2000 BCE with the end of Sumerian power, to 2001 CE, with the second Intifada suicide bombing. The center of the room includes an interactive guide to global Jewish history, and the initial circular room is a reminder of the scope of that history. This portion of the exhibit begins with a quote from Leo Tolstoy: "The Jew is the emblem of eternity. He whom neither slaughter nor torture of thousands of years could destroy...He who was the first to produce the oracles of G-d, he who has been for so long the guardian of prophecy, and transmitted it to the rest of the world - such a nation cannot be destroyed. The Jew is everlasting as eternity itself." (The spelling "G-d" is used throughout the exhibit to respect a Jewish practice.)

The goal of the Museum of European Jewish Heritage is to educate visitors about the culture and way of life that were destroyed by the perpetrators of the Holocaust, aiming to kindle an awareness of the ethical, moral, spiritual, educational and cultural contributions of the Jewish people, and thereby promote inter-cultural understanding. The museum contains a Timeline of Jewish History, which details the contributions of each major community of Jews, organized by country and historical period, including names, pictures and the nature of individual contributions by authors, artists, communal leaders and institutions. In addition to the Timeline, the history of European Jewish culture is documented through artwork, maps, photographs, audio-visual presentations and a shtetl replica. The exhibit recognizes the active role of Jewish people in the global political economy, including their role in science, socialist revolution, political activism, combating racism, anti-Semitism, and community building through community organizations such as the Kehillah.

The exhibition includes a historical catalog of anti-Semitism prior to and following the rise and collapse of the Nazi Regime as a reminder that anti-Semitism is historically pervasive beyond the history of the Holocaust and Nazism. This portion includes the history of the Blood Libel, Russian and Polish Pogroms, Wilhelm Marr and the Anti-Semitic League, the history of Alfred Dreyfus, American anti-Semitism and the Protocols of the Elders of Zion, Henry Ford's role in American anti-Semitic social and cultural structures, and pre-WWII National Socialism. This exhibit leads into the next, and emphasizes the longstanding persecutions of global Jewish communities, and their resistance to anti-Semitism.

Turning the final corner leads to the history of European Jewish communities, from their emergence from the Ghetto in 1871, to Berlin urbanization in 1888-1918, to World War I from 1914 to 1918, and finally to the Weimar Republic from 1918 to 1933. This section catalogs the history of the role of Jewish communities in a broader European history, and leads into the following Descent Into Nazism exhibit.

=== Descent Into Nazism ===
The next exhibit leads the viewer down a long hallway of curated Nazi artifacts, headed with a large portrait of Adolf Hitler. The hallway is dimly lit with black and red paint in stark comparison to the varying colors of the Jewish Heritage exhibit. The exhibit includes the political and cultural structures which established anti-Semitism as a paradigm in Nazi Germany and its eventual annexed territories. The walkway veering to the left includes detailed information on the Law for the Restoration of the Professional Civil Service, the Reich Citizenship Law, the Nuremberg Law for the Protection of German Blood and German Honor, and the Second Decree Implementing the Law Concerning the Change in Family Names. Each law among many other social and cultural structures contributed to the legalization and normalization of anti-Semitism in Nazi Germany. Following this section is a videoed exhibit on Herschel Grynszpan, a German Jew who shot and killed a German Diplomat at the German Embassy in Paris in 1938. This became the justification for Kristalinacht, or "the Night of Broken Glass," where 300 synagogues were burned down and 200 homes and 7,500 shops and businesses were destroyed, along with the murder of 91 Jewish people and the placement of 30,000 Jewish men into concentration camps.

The exhibit follows with descriptions of other groups persecuted by the Nazi regime, including homosexuals, Jehovah's Witnesses, and Romani peoples. At the center of this hallway flanked by curated Nazi uniforms and armaments' is an explanation of Nazi hierarchy, with the central Nazi leaders at the center, including Hans Frank, Martin Bormann, Hermann Goering, Heinrich Himmler, Paul Josef (Joseph) Goebbels, Rudolf Hess, Adolf Eichmann, Albert Speer, and in the center, Adolf Hitler. On the left side of the entrance to the following section of the exhibit is a collection of artifacts and history of the MS St. Louis, the last passenger ship to leave Nazi Germany, carrying 937 German Jewish Passengers, highlighting the situations and avenues German Jews pursued in emigration.

This exhibit details the active struggle of Jewish communities in the Ghettos across Europe, including an extensive contribution to the history of the Warsaw Ghetto, the history and construction of the Judenrat, and the Warsaw Ghetto Uprising. This section of the exhibition aligns with the museums goals of emphasizing the active resistance of Jewish communities against the Nazi regime. This section leads into a timeline of Nazi expansion and WWII history, and the transition into the Final Solution. It emphasizes the processes of genocide across different European nations, the historical causalities of war and their effects on those processes, and the ways in which Nazi officials denied genocide and attempted to erase evidence. This final section also portrays the different forms of active resistance of Jewish and other persecuted groups against Nazi extermination across different nations and historical scenarios.

=== The Camp System ===
This exhibit includes detailed video footage and information about the proliferation of concentration camps and extermination camps. The exhibitions leads with a cattle car which can be entered, and on the left and front walls of the car are the portrayals of Jewish victims. Entering the camp system brings one through a gate made in the likeness of a Nazi era concentration camp. Camps began construction in 1933, and were used first to primarily persecute political enemies of the Nazi regime, and as the regime expanded, more camps were constructed and were used for the extermination of Jewish peoples and other groups considered degenerate by the Nazi regime. While the most infamous camps include Treblinka, Auschwitz-Birkenau, Dachau, Chelmno, Sobibor, Belzec and Majdanek, this exhibit emphasizes the existence of thousands of camps across Europe. This exhibit also catalogs the history of camp construction and their political and social relevance to the regime. The center of this exhibit features a detailed video of the camps, and on the left, the entrance to the following exhibit.

=== The Abyss ===
This exhibit displays an array of televisions portraying the video footage complied by Dwight D. Eisenhower's mandate which required civilian news media and military personnel to record the horrific conditions of the concentration and extermination camps. The exhibit consists of a long hallway with the video footage playing on the television array on the left side, and at the end a sculpture of a Jewish victim with a bunk typical to a camp at their back. Prior to The Abyss walkway is a content warning for the disturbing imagery ahead.

=== The Postwar Period ===
Exiting The Abyss leads to an extensive exhibit detailing the aftermath of the fall of the Nazi regime. It includes information on the Nuremberg trials and the judicial persecution or acquittals of Nazi leadership, and the global political economy's response to the fall of Nazi Germany. Atop the faces of those on trial is a statement which reads, "The Verdict: The Nuremberg War Crimes Trials brought 22 Nazi officials to court in 1945-1946. People were shocked by how ordinary the defendants seemed..." This statement aligns with the center's mission of emphasizing that the crimes against humanity committed by the Nazi regime could be repeated, as these men were ordinary, and yet committed genocide.

The center of the exhibition is dedicated to survivors, forming a blue-lit circle. To the left are the stories of orphans displaced by the Holocaust, and to the right is a description of displaced persons, detailing the diasporic history of Jewish peoples following the Holocaust. Each section emphasizes the struggle and triumph of survivors and the family of survivors following the collapse of the Nazi regime. Accompanied with the global political history of the post-war international landscape, the history of survivors, displaced Jewish communities, and orphaned Jewish children, emphasize the active and ongoing history of the Jewish community across the globe.

=== Portraits of Honor ===
Following the Postwar Period is the Portraits of Honor, honoring Michigan Holocaust Survivors. A ramp displays the portraits of survivors on the left and also emphasizes the life of survivors in metropolitan Detroit. The exhibit was developed under the guidance of Dr. Charles Silow, a son of Holocaust Survivors. The exhibit not only portrays the suffering and violence experienced by survivors of the Holocaust, but their triumph in overcoming one of mankind's greatest atrocities. The exhibit also emphasizes the cultural hurdles faced by survivors in diaspora, and the way Michigan's social and cultural landscape effected their journey. The Portraits of Honor reminds that despite genocide and wanton violence, Jewish people have fought, rebuilt, and created lives for themselves across the world.

=== The Viola & Garry Kappy Anne Frank Tree Exhibit and Garden ===
In 2009, the HC was selected as one of the eleven sites in the United States to receive a sapling from the tree that grew outside of Anne Frank's hiding place in Amsterdam. The exhibit emphasizes that as she was in hiding for almost two years, she could only see out of a single window, where she would gaze at this white chestnut tree. The tree blooms outside behind the exhibits signage which details the diary of Anne Frank and the contributions of her history to a larger understanding of the Holocaust.

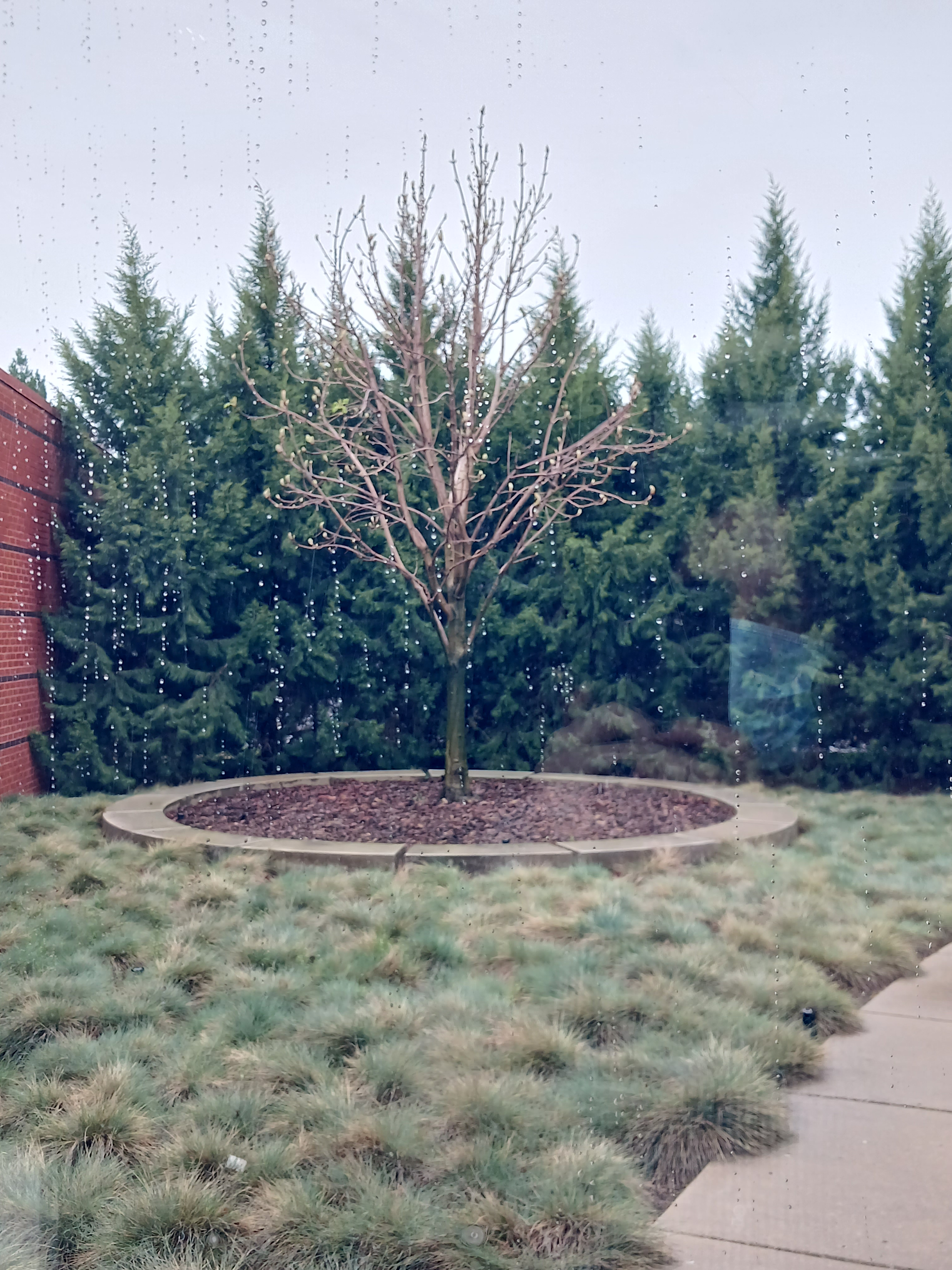
Anne Frank White Chestnut Tree Sapling at the Zekelman Holocaust Memorial Center.

=== The Harry & Wanda Zekelman International Institute of the Righteous ===
The International Institute of the Righteous (IIR) provides visitors with a look at the people and institutions who performed acts of altruism in history in the face of evil or great danger.

The IIR pays tribute to those who have rescued and supported their fellow human beings, even at great risk to themselves and their families. Exhibits include portraits and individual biographies together with governmental and organizational histories that highlight altruistic acts.

=== Kindertransport Memory Quilts ===
"In 1988, Anita Grosz, the daughter of Kindertransport survivor Hanus Grosz, conceived the idea of preserving the memories of Kindertransport experience the art of quilting." The exhibit displays the work of these "Kinder," who are now adults, through quilting which share the experiences of repressed memories. It is an exhibit which emphasizes collective memory portrayed through art and community, and the HC emphasizes the difficulty of verbalizing memories of trauma experienced by survivors and their families.

=== Library Archives ===
The HC contains physical and online archives which can be accessed by the public through appointment or electronically through their website. Their collections include: Allied Response, Antisemitism, Art, Bibliography, Biography, Children, Concentration Camps, Curricula, Displaced Persons, Dissertations, European Jewish History, Genealogy, Geographical Finding Aids, Ghettos, Jewish-Christian Relations, Judaica, Juvenile Literature, Kindertransport, Legislation, Liberation, Literature of the Holocaust, Medical Aspects, Memorial Books, Memorial and Museums, Music, National Socialism, Newspapers and Periodicals, Personal Narratives, Propaganda, Psychological Studies, Refugees, Registers, Relief Organizations, Rescue Efforts, Resistance, Revisionism, Righteous Gentiles, Second Generation, U.S. Role, War Crime Trials, and WWII Aftermath. Archive visitors can contact Feiga Weiss for access to archival materials.

== Community Involvement ==
The Zekelman Holocaust Center involves itself with the local and state community to engage and educate community members. It hosts a number of events, including the Ellie Wiesel Night Competition, the Yom HaShoah Commemoration Holocaust Remembrace Day, the Zekelman Family Campus Family Campus, self-guided tours, and institution tours. The HC also supports learning & leadership programs for younger age groups, and an adult museum education program, which "offers custom interactive experiences with in-person tours of our exhibits and virtual museum experiences. The educational programs offer corporate cultural diversity workshops, programs for security sector professionals, professional development workshops for educators, museum experiences for middle & high school groups, art & writing competitions for students grades seven through twelve. Each program emphasizes the historical and community significance of the Holocaust.

=== Press Coverage ===
As one of the premier Holocaust Museums in the United States, the HC has been covered extensively by local and national news. In 2022, it has been covered by The Detroit Free Press regarding the Homeland Security Chief in Metro Detroit's visit to the HC. In 2021, the HC announced its largest gift in 37 years with the $15 million donation from the Zekelmans. In 2013, the Jewish News covered the planting of the Anne Frank Tree Sapling, and in the same year USA Today covered the removal of Nazi signage at an abandoned automobile plant in Detroit. The HC continues to receive press coverage during community events, with donations, and the opening of new exhibitions or re-opening of closed exhibits.

== Board of directors ==
The museum was founded by survivors and continues to honor their memory and history through their facilitators, curators, and board of directors. The current Board of Directors includes the Governance Committee, consisting of Gary Karp as President, Steve D. Grant as Chairman, Larry Kraft as Vice President, Adam Grant as Secretary, Alan Zekelman as Treasurer, Leo Eisenberg, Steven R. Weisberg, and Arthurt Jay Weiss. Other Board Members include Frederick Blechman, Mindi Fynke, Kenneth Goss, Nelson Hersh, Lilly Jacobson, Barbary Kappy, Irvin Kappy, Shari Ferber Kaufman, Arie Leibovitz, Lainie Lipshultz, Edward Malinowski, Spencer Patrich, David Propis, Sam Shamie, Alex Shiffman, David Silbert, Charles Silow, Bubba Urdan, and Arthur A. Weiss.
