= Khalid Kareem =

American football player (born 1998)

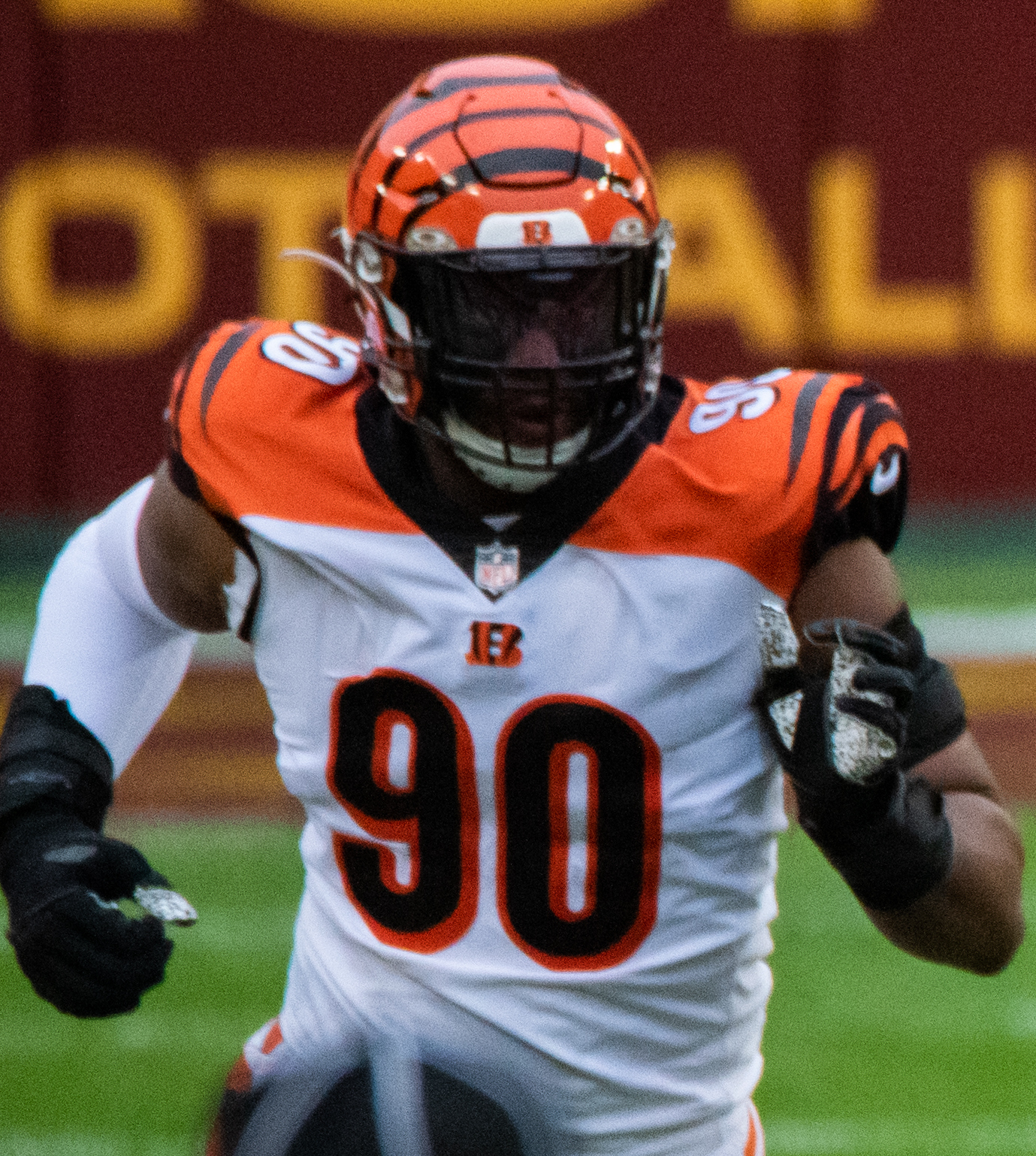
- Kareem with the Cincinnati Bengals in 2020

No. 47 – San Francisco 49ers
- Position: Defensive lineman
- Roster status: Active

Personal information
- Born: April 28, 1998 (age 28); Detroit, Michigan, U.S.
- Listed height: 6 ft 4 in (1.93 m)
- Listed weight: 268 lb (122 kg)

Career information
- High school: Harrison (Farmington, Michigan)
- College: Notre Dame (2016–2019)
- NFL draft: 2020: 5th round, 147th overall pick

Career history
- Cincinnati Bengals (2020–2022); Indianapolis Colts (2022); Chicago Bears (2023); Atlanta Falcons (2024–2025); New York Giants (2026)*; Atlanta Falcons (2026)*; San Francisco 49ers (2026–present)
- * Offseason or practice squad member only

Career NFL statistics as of 2025
- Total tackles: 41
- Sacks: 1
- Forced fumbles: 1
- Fumble recoveries: 1
- Pass deflections: 2
- Stats at Pro Football Reference

Khalid Ali Kareem (born April 28, 1998) is an American professional football defensive lineman for the San Francisco 49ers of the National Football League (NFL). He played college football for the Notre Dame Fighting Irish and was selected by the Cincinnati Bengals in the fifth round of the 2020 NFL draft. He previously played for the Indianapolis Colts, Chicago Bears, and Atlanta Falcons.

== Early life ==
Kareem attended Harrison High School in Farmington, Michigan. He committed to the University of Notre Dame to play college football.

== College career ==
Kareem played at Notre Dame from 2016 to 2019. During his career, he had 108 tackles and 13 sacks.

== Professional career ==
Pre-draft measurables
Height	Weight	Arm length	Hand span	Wingspan
6 ft 3 3/4 in (1.92 m)	268 lb (122 kg)	34 3/8 in (0.87 m)	10 7/8 in (0.28 m)	7 ft 0 in (2.13 m)
All values from NFL Combine

=== Cincinnati Bengals ===
Kareem was selected by the Cincinnati Bengals with the 147th overall pick in the fifth round of the 2020 NFL draft. He was placed on the active/non-football injury list on July 27, 2020. Kareem was activated on August 23. In Week 11 against the Washington Football Team, Kareem recorded his first, and to date, only career sack on Alex Smith during the 20–9 loss.

On September 2, 2021, Kareem was placed on injured reserve. He was activated on October 30.

On September 1, 2022, Kareem was placed on injured reserve with a hamstring injury. He was activated on October 10, then waived the next day and re-signed to the practice squad.

=== Indianapolis Colts ===
On November 22, 2022, Kareem was signed by the Indianapolis Colts off the Bengals practice squad. He made four appearance for the Colts, recording one tackle. Kareem was waived by Indianapolis on August 29, 2023.

=== Chicago Bears ===
On August 30, 2023, Kareem was claimed off waivers by the Chicago Bears. He was placed on injured reserve on September 23. Kareem was activated on October 29, but released two days later and re-signed to the practice squad. He signed a reserve/future contract with Chicago on January 16, 2024. Kareem was released by the Bears on August 23.

=== Atlanta Falcons ===
On August 30, 2024, Kareem was signed to the practice squad of the Atlanta Falcons. He made two appearances for the team, recording four combined tackles while splitting defensive and special teams snaps.

Kareem signed a reserve/future contract with the Falcons on January 6, 2025. On August 26, Kareem was released by the Falcons as part of final roster cuts; he was re-signed to the practice squad the next day. He was signed to the active roster on November 13. Kareem was released by Atlanta on November 27, and re-signed to the practice squad. He was promoted back to the active roster on January 1, 2026.

=== New York Giants ===
On May 14, 2026, Kareem signed a one-year contract with the New York Giants. On August 30, Kareem was waived by the Giants as a part of final roster cuts.

=== Atlanta Falcons (second stint) ===
On September 2, 2026, Kareem was signed to the Atlanta Falcons' practice squad, reuniting with defensive coordinator Jeff Ulbrich.

=== San Francisco 49ers ===
On September 4, 2026, Kareem was signed by the San Francisco 49ers off of the Falcons' practice squad, reuniting with his former head coach Raheem Morris.
