= Donald Foss =

American businessman (1943/1944 – 2022)

- Born: 1943 or 1944
- Died: August 14, 2022 (aged 78)
- Title: Founder, CEO, and chairman of Credit Acceptance
- Children: 3

Donald A. Foss (1943 or 1944 – August 14, 2022) was an American billionaire businessman, the founder, chairman, and CEO of the subprime car finance company Credit Acceptance. At his death, his net worth was estimated at US$2 billion.

== Early life ==
Foss was born c. 1944. His father was a used car salesman.

== Career ==
Foss founded Credit Acceptance in 1972. In January 2017, Foss stepped down as the company's chairman.

As of March 2018, Forbes estimated his net worth at US$1.2 billion.

== Personal life ==
Foss was married, with three children, and lived in Farmington Hills, Michigan. He died on August 14, 2022, at the age of 78.
