= Credit Acceptance =

Auto financing company

Credit Acceptance Corporation
- Type: Public
- Traded as: Nasdaq: CACC; Russell 1000 component; S&P 600 component
- Industry: Financial
- Founded: 1972; 54 years ago
- Founder: Donald Foss
- Headquarters: Southfield, Michigan, United States
- Key people: Vinayak Hegde (CEO)
- Services: Credit Services
- Revenue: ▲US$2.32 billion (2025)
- Operating income: ▲US$857.5 million (2019)
- Net income: ▲US$424 million (2025)
- Total assets: ▼US$8.63 billion (2025)
- Total equity: ▼US$1.52 billion (2025)
- Website: creditacceptance.com

Credit Acceptance Corporation is an auto finance company providing automobile loans and other related financial products. The company operates its financial program through a national network of dealer-partners, the automobile dealers participating in the programs. The company operates two programs: the "Portfolio Program" and the "Purchase Program". Through these programs, the company can advance money to automobile dealers in exchange for the right to service the underlying consumer loans and can buy the consumer loans from automobile dealers. Credit Acceptance reported annual revenue of $1.49B for 2019.

== History ==
In 1972, Credit Acceptance Corporation was founded by Donald Foss, one of the largest used car dealers in the world at that time. In 1992, Credit Acceptance Corporation completed its initial public offering on the Nasdaq exchange, where it trades under the symbol "CACC."

== Criticism ==
On December 12, 2019 NPR aired a segment of Morning Edition called "The Big Business Of Subprime Auto Loans", by Anjali Kamat, which described "the murky world of subprime auto finance," and called it "eerily similar to the subprime mortgage lending that touched off the last financial crisis." Aaron Greenspan, a short-seller and transparency expert who published a detailed report about the company, said: "It's a very strange set of circumstances where, like, high finance has been married with this kind of seedy underbelly of the auto industry."

Credit Acceptance has been investigated by the Department of Justice and the Federal Trade Commission for questionable practices related to subprime lending. Credit Acceptance repossesses 35 percent of the cars it finances.

The company has also been criticized for its opaque accounting. According to an article by Aaron Back for the Wall Street Journal, "The problem is that the company’s unique accounting practices make it difficult to see how its loans are really doing. Credit Acceptance uses a form of 'level yield accounting' that is normally applied to purchases of already impaired loans. This means Credit Acceptance doesn’t disclose what portion of loans are delinquent or have defaulted."
