= FCH =

FCH may refer to:

== Football clubs ==
- 1. FC Heidenheim 1846, in Germany
- F.C. Hansa Rostock, in Germany
- FC Helsingborg, in Sweden
- FC Hessleholm, in Sweden
- FC Hjørring, in Denmark
- FC Homburg, in Germany

== Other uses ==
- Familial combined hyperlipidemia
- Felipe Calderón Hinojosa (born 1962), President of Mexico 2006–2012
- Forum Club Handball
- Fraser Canyon Hospital, in Hope, British Columbia, Canada
- Fresno Chandler Executive Airport, in California, United States
- The Fuller Center for Housing, an American housing charity
- Fundación Chile (FCh), a Chilean think tank
- Fusion controller hub, an AMD chipset
- Free Capitol Hill, a self-declared autonomous zone
