= Farmington Central High School (Michigan) =

High school in Michigan, United States

Location
- 30415 Shiawassee Street; Farmington Hills, Michigan 48336; United States; 42°27′29″N 83°20′53″W

Information
- Type: Public high school
- School district: Farmington Public School District
- Principal: Monica Niemiec
- Teaching staff: 10.41 (FTE)
- Enrollment: 149 (2023-2024)
- Student to teacher ratio: 14.31
- Colors: Red and White
- Mascot: Cougar
- Website: Farmington Central High School

Student assessments
- 2021–22 school year Change vs. prior year

M-STEP 11th grade proficiency rates (Science / Social Studies)
- Advanced %: ≤20 / ≤20
- Proficient %: – / ≤20
- PR. Proficient %: ≤20 / –
- Not Proficient %: – / –

Average test scores
- SAT Total: 775.0 (▼ −64)

Farmington Central High School is a public high school in Farmington, Michigan, which serves students ages 16–19 in an alternative setting while meeting the FPS benchmarks. The school is part of Farmington Public Schools. Central High is a consolidated version of Farmington Alternative High School and Farmington Community School. The building was originally Shiawassee Elementary School, which closed in 1980.

== Application process ==
- Applications are accepted on an ongoing basis and admittance possible when space is available.
- FPS students may pick up an application from their guidance counselor at the home school.
- Out of district students may pick up an application in the front office of Farmington Community School.
- Interviews of applicants are conducted by counselors as openings exist.

== Programs ==
1. High School Completion provides anyone over the age of 16, who has already dropped out of high school, an opportunity to complete the credit necessary to earn their high school diploma or General Educational Development (GED) certificate.
2. Adult Basic Education offers programs in math and reading for developmentally disabled adults over the age of 26 without a high school diploma.
3. Alternative Education provides “at-risk” students between the ages of 16 and 19 an alternative way to earn their high school diploma. Classes are taught by certified instructors and follow the same curriculum and benchmarks as a traditional high school. Students who graduate from Farmington Central High receive a traditional high school diploma.
4. English as a Second Language is a program for foreign-born adults who wish to improve their proficiency in English. Course material progresses from basic vocabulary to conversational competence, citizenship studies, and an understanding of American culture. Various levels of classes are provided in order to meet the needs of the individual. Transition classes help those wanting to go on to the High School Completion Program.

== Student body statistics ==
The graduation rate is the percentage of ninth-graders who graduate from high school within four years, adjusting for students who move in or out of the District and to alternative programs. The rate is calculated by the State from data provided by the District. Parent Participation: The Alternative Education program has a high degree of parental involvement. All statistics are from Farmington Public Schools Annual Reports.

2007 - 2008 School Year

- Student Body:

Central High School – 94 (31 females, 63 males)

- Graduation Rate - Currently N/A
- Parent Participation - 83%

2006 - 2007 School Year

- Student Body:

Alternative Education/High School Completion - 168 students (62 females, 106 males)

- Graduation Rate - 87.13%
- Parent Participation - 87%

== Student organizations ==
Round Table, Students Operating Schools MAEO Stars (Michigan Alternative Education Organization), and the Multicultural Multiracial Diversity Committees.

== Athletics ==
- Softball
- Bowling

== See also ==
- Farmington Public Schools
