= Farmington High School (Michigan) =

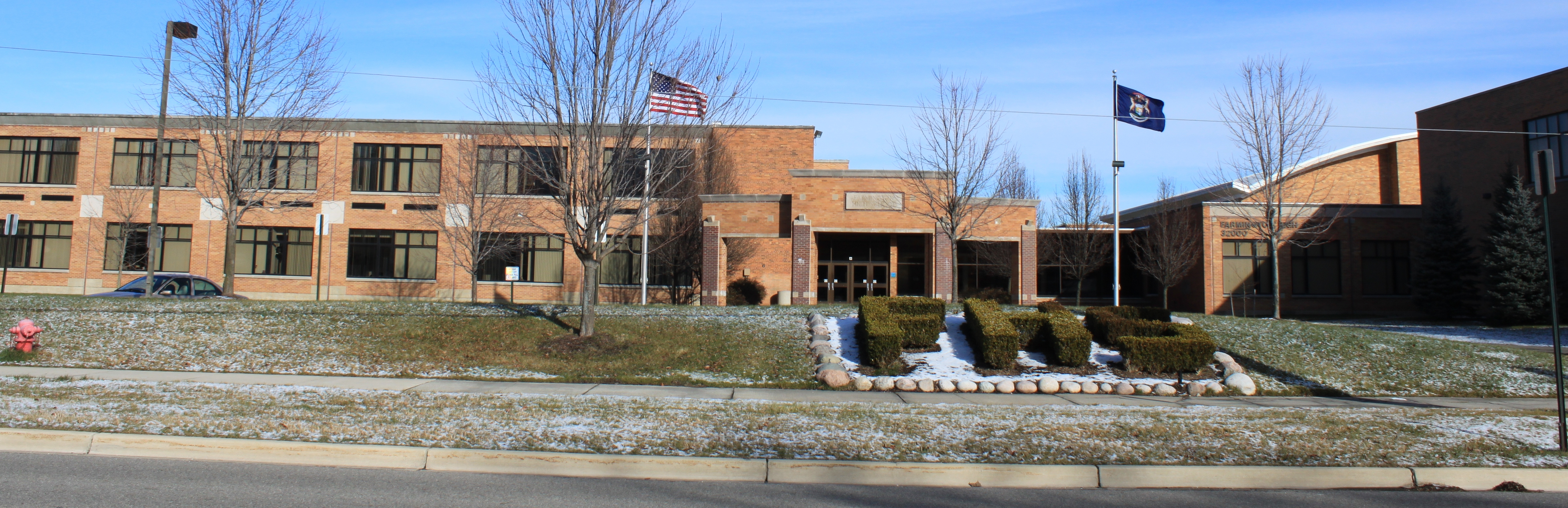

Location
- 32000 Shiawassee Street; Farmington, Michigan 48336; United States; 42°27′50″N 83°21′41″W

Information
- Type: Public high school
- Opened: 1888
- School district: Farmington Public Schools
- Principal: Chris Meussner
- Teaching staff: 83.88 (on an FTE basis)
- Grades: 9–12
- Enrollment: 1,471 (2023–2024)
- Student to teacher ratio: 17.54
- Campus type: Suburban
- Colors: Blue and White
- Mascot: “Freddie The Falcon”
- Newspaper: The Blue and White
- Website: fhs.farmington.k12.mi.us

Farmington High School is a public high school located in Farmington, Michigan. The school was established in 1888, and the first sections of the current building were built in 1953, with several renovations and additions occurring since then. As of the 2022–2023 school year, the school educates a student body of 1,400. The principal is Chris Meussner.

== History ==
Farmington High School traces its roots back over 125 years. While no date has been fully confirmed, 1888 has been accepted as the year the school was first established. The school is listed as being first accredited in 1920 by the University of Michigan. First known as the Union School, the class sizes have grown steadily over the years, from the single digits during the 19th century, to over one thousand students in recent years. The first bus operated by the schools in the area began running with service to Farmington in 1929.

The building itself has changed significantly over the years. One of the earlier buildings, initially constructed in 1918, was used until 1952. In 1953, sections of the current building were first constructed. Additions over the years, including a major renovation in 1998, have increased available space and amenities.

The school mascot is the Falcon, and students commonly referring to the mascot as "Freddie the Falcon."

The hockey team won the state championship in the 2013 / 2014 Season.

== Academics ==
Student assessments
- 2021–22 school year Change vs. prior year

M-STEP 11th grade proficiency rates (Science / Social Studies)
- Advanced %: 19.1 / 18.2
- Proficient %: 19.7 / 31.3
- PR. Proficient %: 12.9 / 44.2
- Not Proficient %: 48.3 / 6.3

Average test scores
- SAT Total: 1026.6 (▼ −54.4)

In the 2012-2013 graduating class, 96% of graduates enrolled in a college or university: 69% enrolled in four-year universities, and 27% enrolled in two-year colleges. The remaining 4% of graduates joined the workforce, military, or had other post graduation plans. In the 2013 graduating class, two students were National Merit recipients and four were commended. Out of 357 Advanced Placement exams taken, 305 (85%) received a score of 3 or better.

Farmington does not assign class rank. If college applications require class rank information, for scholarships or otherwise, Farmington will include a letter stating that the school does not rank students, as well as the rationale behind the decision not to perform ranking.

=== Enrollment and graduation history ===
School Year	Enrollment	Number of Graduates	Number of Teachers/Staff	Principal	Source(s)
1939	N/A	77	N/A	O. E. Dunckel (Superintendent)	
1950	N/A	81	N/A	Gerald V. Harrison	
1965	N/A	337	58 (Note: Taken from "Number of high school teachers")	James Geiger	
1967	1337	384	59	James Geiger	
1972	1636	436	65	James Geiger	
1979	1347	475	59	G. Potter	
1982	1308	410	55	G. Potter	
1984	1261	316	56	G. Potter	
2006	1358	N/A	77 (Note: Taken as X from "There are X professional teaching staff members and appropriate staff to meet special needs.")	John Barrett	
2008	1385	N/A	78	John Barrett	
2011	1351	292	73 (Note: Taken from "Number of faculty")	Julie Kaminski	
2013	1214	313	70	Julie Kaminski	
2014	1156	N/A	N/A	Julie Kaminski	

=== Test scores ===
The State of Michigan publishes the ACT test scores for all of the schools in the state. The scores for Farmington are as follows:

School Year	Composite Score	English Score	Reading Score	Mathematics Score	Science Score	Number of Students Tested
2014-2015	21.5	21.5	21.5	21.0	21.6	275
2013-2014	21.5	21.1	21.4	21.3	21.6	253
2012-2013	21.3	20.8	21.3	21.1	21.6	321
2011-2012	21.2	20.4	21.0	21.4	21.5	293
2010-2011	21.0	20.4	20.8	21.1	21.3	334
2009-2010	21.3	20.8	21.3	21.1	21.4	352
2008-2009	20.8	20.6	20.5	20.7	20.7	298
2007-2008	20.8	20.1	21.0	20.2	21.2	315
2006-2007	20.5	19.7	20.8	20.4	20.6	329

== Notable alumni ==
- Rex Cawley, Olympic Gold Medalist, 1959
- Cam Fowler, 2009 First round draft pick, Anaheim Ducks
- Garlin Gilchrist, Lieutenant Governor of Michigan, 2019–present
- Eric Lindros, '90, professional hockey player
- Robert Patrick, '77, actor
- Peter Rheinstein, 1961, pharmacologist and former FDA official
- Jordan Turner, '20, college football linebacker
