= Harriet Whitney Frishmuth =

American sculptor

- Born: September 17, 1880; Philadelphia, Pennsylvania, U.S.
- Died: January 1, 1980 (aged 99); Waterbury, Connecticut, U.S.
- Resting place: Laurel Hill Cemetery, Philadelphia, Pennsylvania, U.S.
- Education: École des Beaux-Arts, Art Students League of New York
- Known for: Sculpture
- Partner: Ruth Talcott

Harriet Whitney Frishmuth (September 17, 1880 – January 1, 1980) was an American sculptor known for her works in bronze.

== Life ==
She was born in Philadelphia, Pennsylvania. Her parents divorced when she was in her teens, and she moved to Europe with her mother and sisters, living there for eight years. She studied briefly with Auguste Rodin at the École des Beaux-Arts in Paris, and for two years with Cuno von Uechtritz-Steinkirch in Berlin. She returned to the United States and studied at the Art Students League of New York under Gutzon Borglum and Hermon Atkins MacNeil. While in New York, she worked as an assistant to the sculptor Karl Bitter, and performed dissections at the College of Physicians and Surgeons.

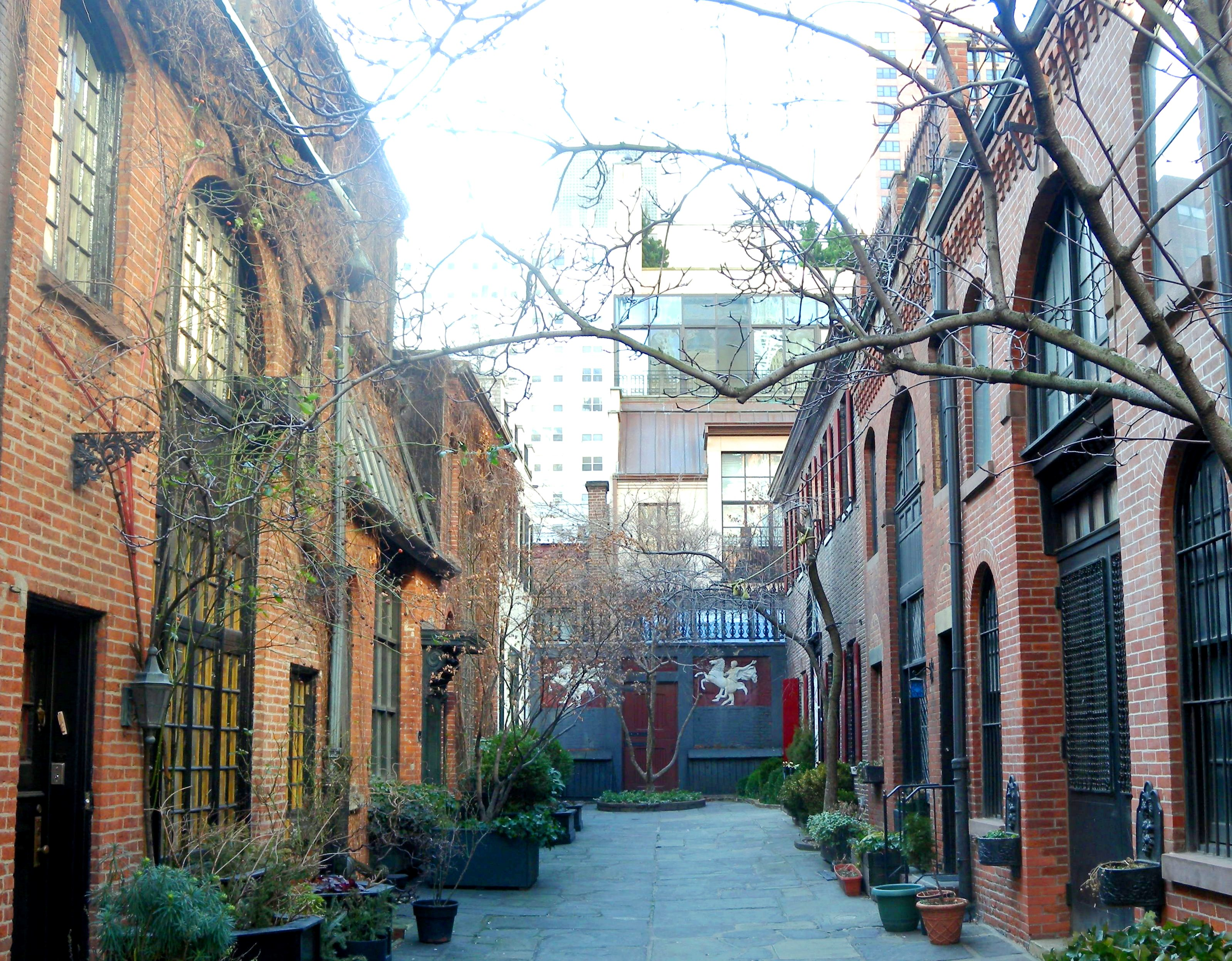
Sniffen Court, New York City

Her first commissioned piece was a bas-relief for the New York County Medical Society in 1910. She also modeled ashtrays, bookends, and small figures for the Gorham Manufacturing Company. Her career grew steadily, and she became well known for her beautiful renderings of females in bronze, particularly dancers (Desha Delteil frequently modeled for her). Her small bronzes were sought by private collectors and museums alike, and her large bronzes often were placed in elaborate garden settings or as the centerpieces of fountains. She also taught; among her pupils were Maude Sherwood Jewett and Eleanor Mary Mellon.

Her work was exhibited at the National Academy of Design, the Pennsylvania Academy of the Fine Arts in Philadelphia, the Salon in Paris, the Golden Gate International Exposition (1939–1940) and the National Association of Women Painters and Sculptors. She also exhibited with the Philadelphia Ten, the renowned group of women artists. She had a studio at Sniffen Court in New York City. One of her last exhibitions was in 1929, though she remained active in the art world for decades afterwards. The Great Depression affected her livelihood; she closed her New York studio in the 1930s, and returned to Philadelphia. She died in 1980 in Waterbury, Connecticut.

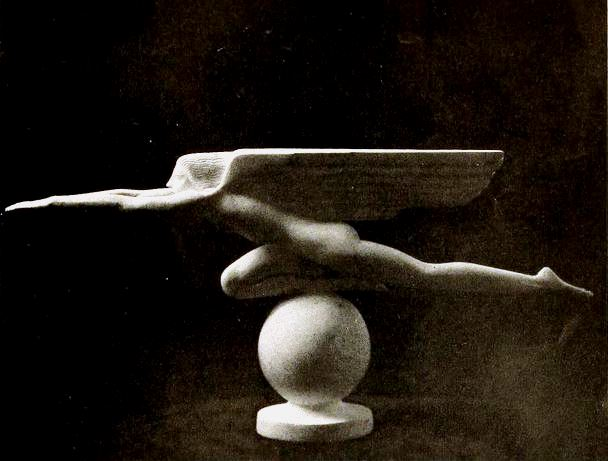
Speed, 1922

Frishmuth scorned modern art and was quite outspoken on the subject, calling it "spiritless" (she was equally outspoken in her dislike of the word "sculptress"). She received a number of recognitions and honors over the course of her career: the St. Gaudens Medal from the Art Students League of New York (while still a student), several awards from the National Academy of Design, a prize from the Grand Central Art Galleries, an honorable mention from the Golden Gate International Exposition, and the Joan of Arc Silver Medal from the National Association of Women Painters and Sculptors. She was elected into the National Academy of Design in 1925 as an Associate member, and became a full Academician in 1929. Her work was part of the sculpture event in the art competition at the 1932 Summer Olympics.

Her papers and a great number of drawings are held at Syracuse University.

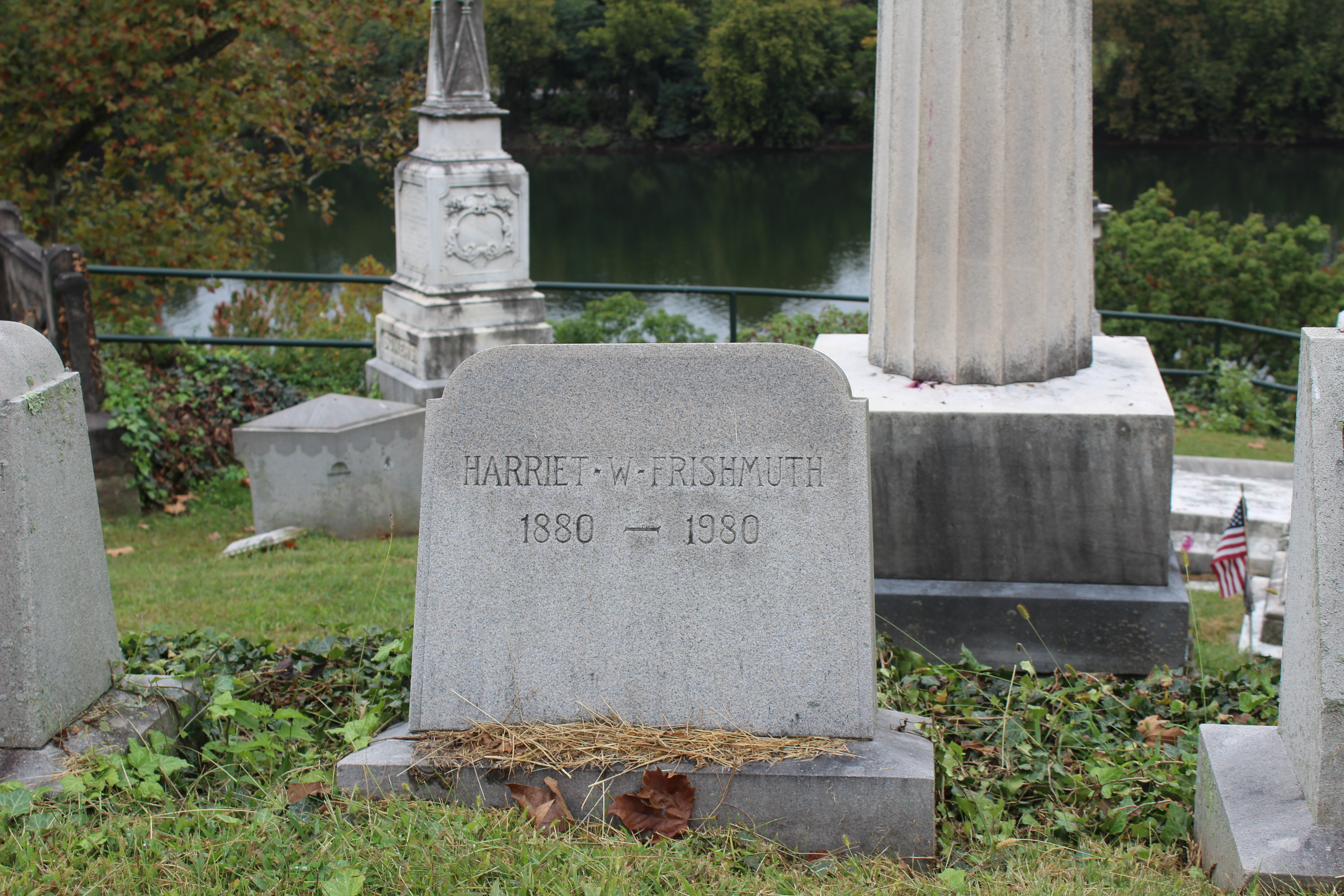
Harriet W. Frishmuth tombstone in Laurel Hill Cemetery

She is buried at Laurel Hill Cemetery, Philadelphia.

While Frishmuth was not open about her sexuality in press interviews of the day, archival records document that she was a lesbian, her partner Ruth Talcott having lived with her from the 1940s until Frishmuth’s death in 1980.

== Selected works ==
- Joy of the Waters (1920), Grand Rapids Art Museum, Grand Rapids, Michigan. Represented in first Woman's World's Fair of 1925.
- The Vine (1923), Metropolitan Museum of Art, New York City.
- Call of the Sea (1924), Brookgreen Gardens, Murrell's Inlet, South Carolina.
- Humoresque (1924), Farmington Community Library, Farmington Hills, Michigan.
- Aspiration (1926), Rogers Tomb, Forest Lawn Cemetery, Buffalo, New York.
- Roses of Yesterday (1928), Rice and Gracelawn Cemetery, Elkhart, Indiana.
- Play Days (1925), Como Park Zoo & Conservatory, Saint Paul, Minnesota
- Crest of the Wave (1929), Como Park Zoo & Conservatory, Saint Paul, Minnesota.
- Scherzo (1929), Bracken Library, Ball State University, Muncie, Indiana.
- Aspiration (1933), Berwind Tomb, Laurel Hill Cemetery, Philadelphia, Pennsylvania. A larger version of the 1926 bronze statue, carved from a single block of granite.
- Peter Pan (1936), New Britain Museum of American Art, New Britain, Connecticut.
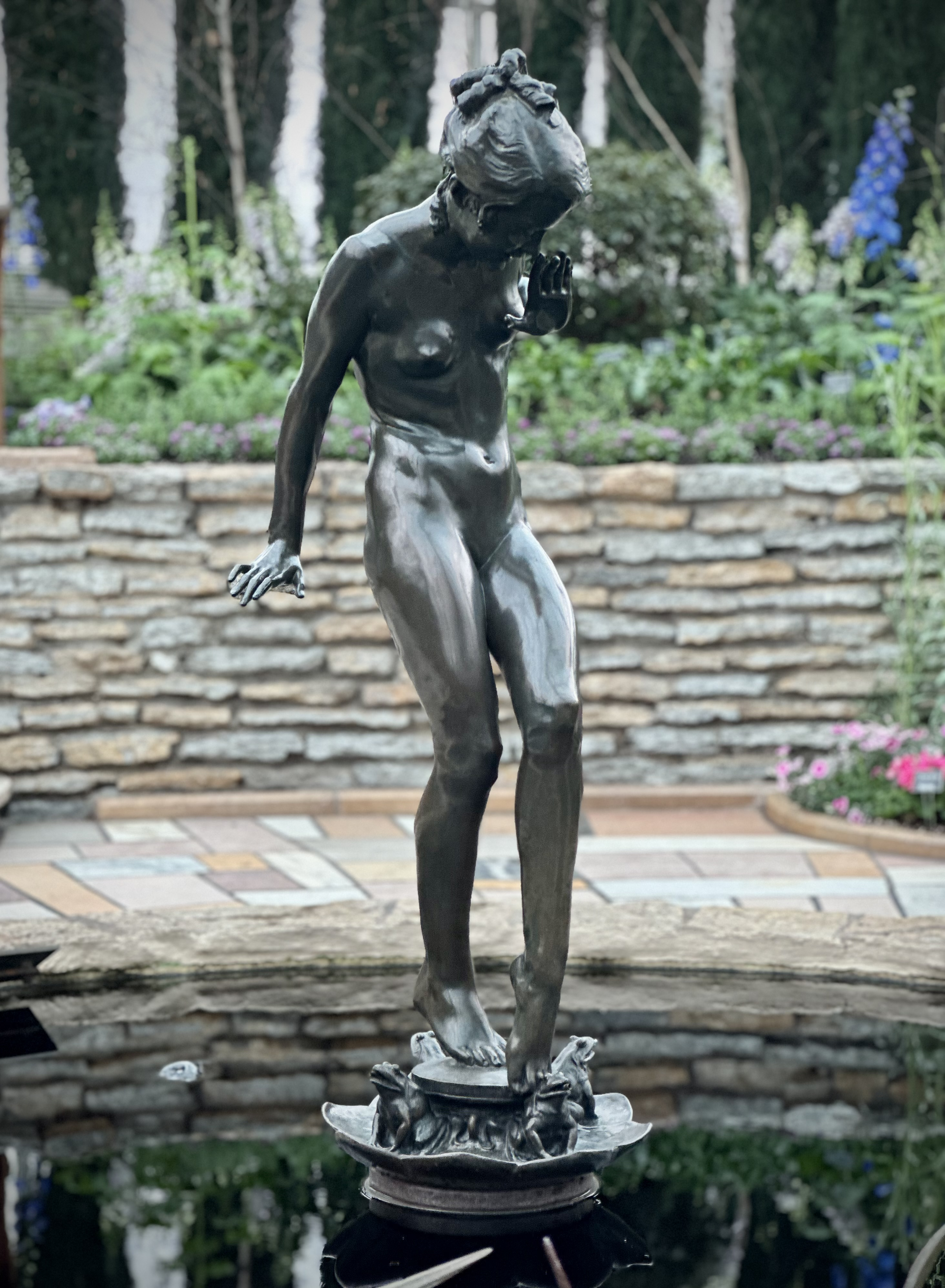
Play Days (1925), Como Park, Zoo, and Conservatory, Saint Paul, Minnesota.

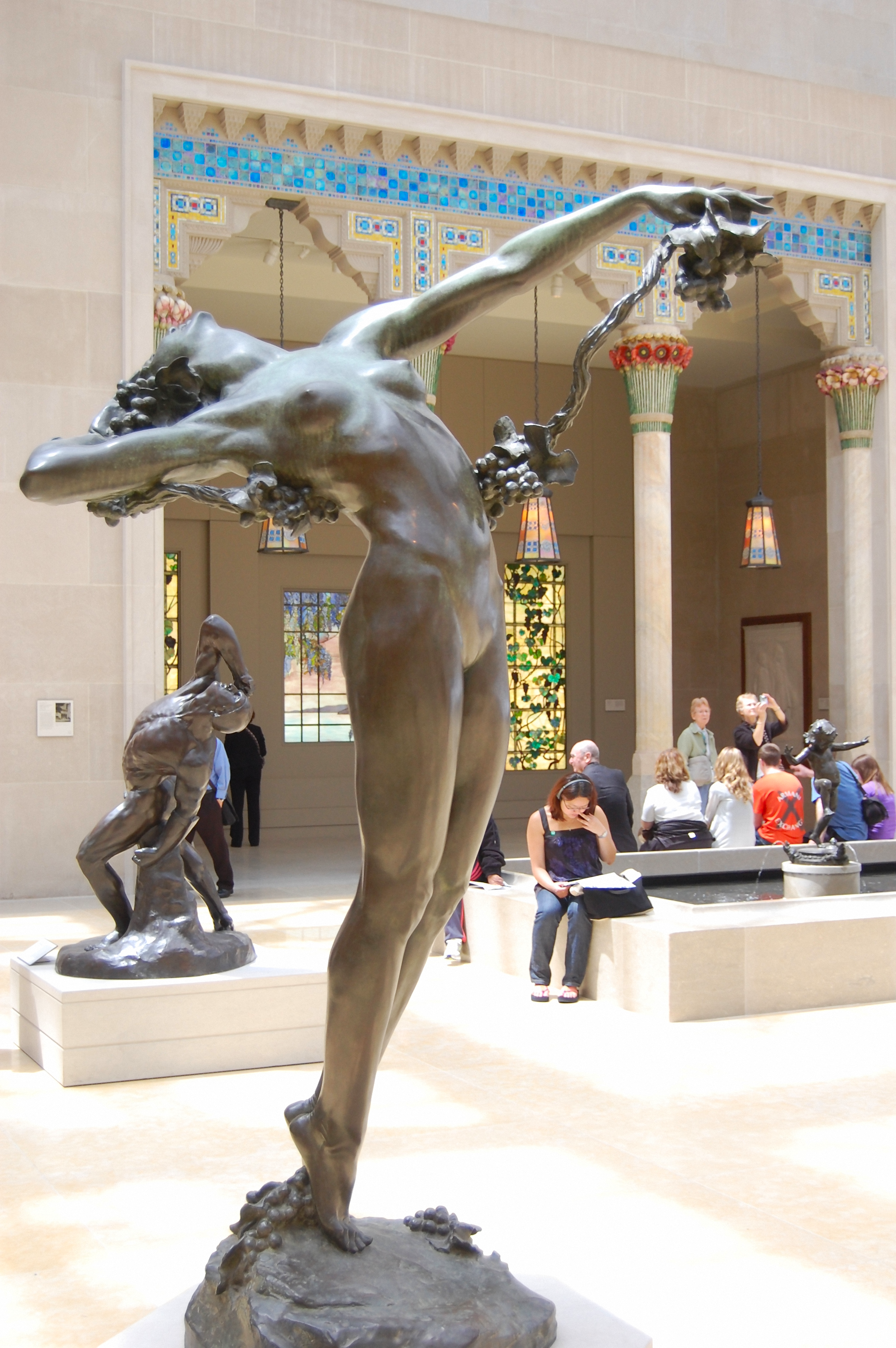
The Vine (1923), Metropolitan Museum of Art, New York City.

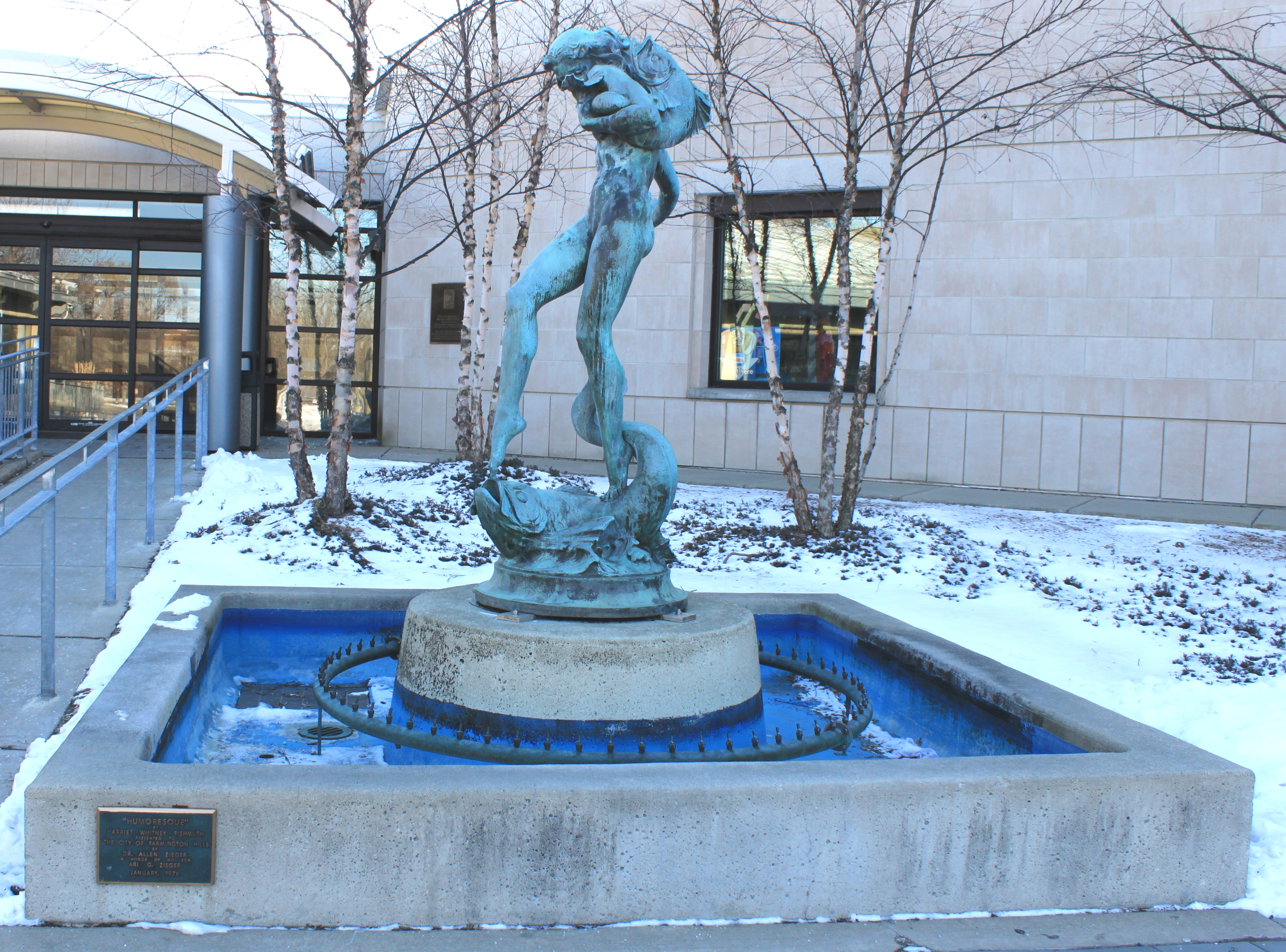
Humoresque (1924), Farmington Community Library, Farmington Hills, Michigan.

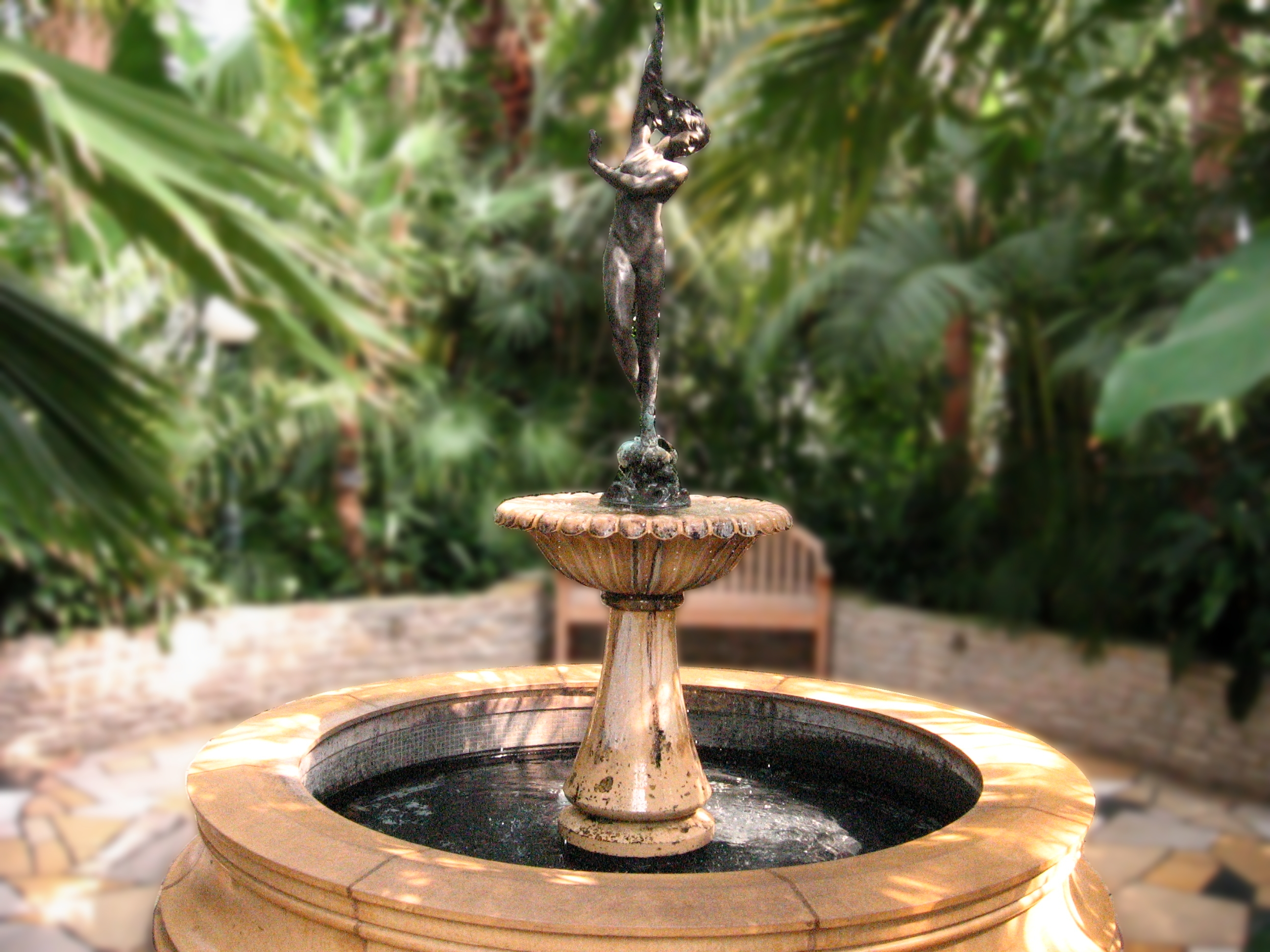
Crest of the Wave (1929), Como Park, Zoo, and Conservatory, St. Paul, Minnesota.

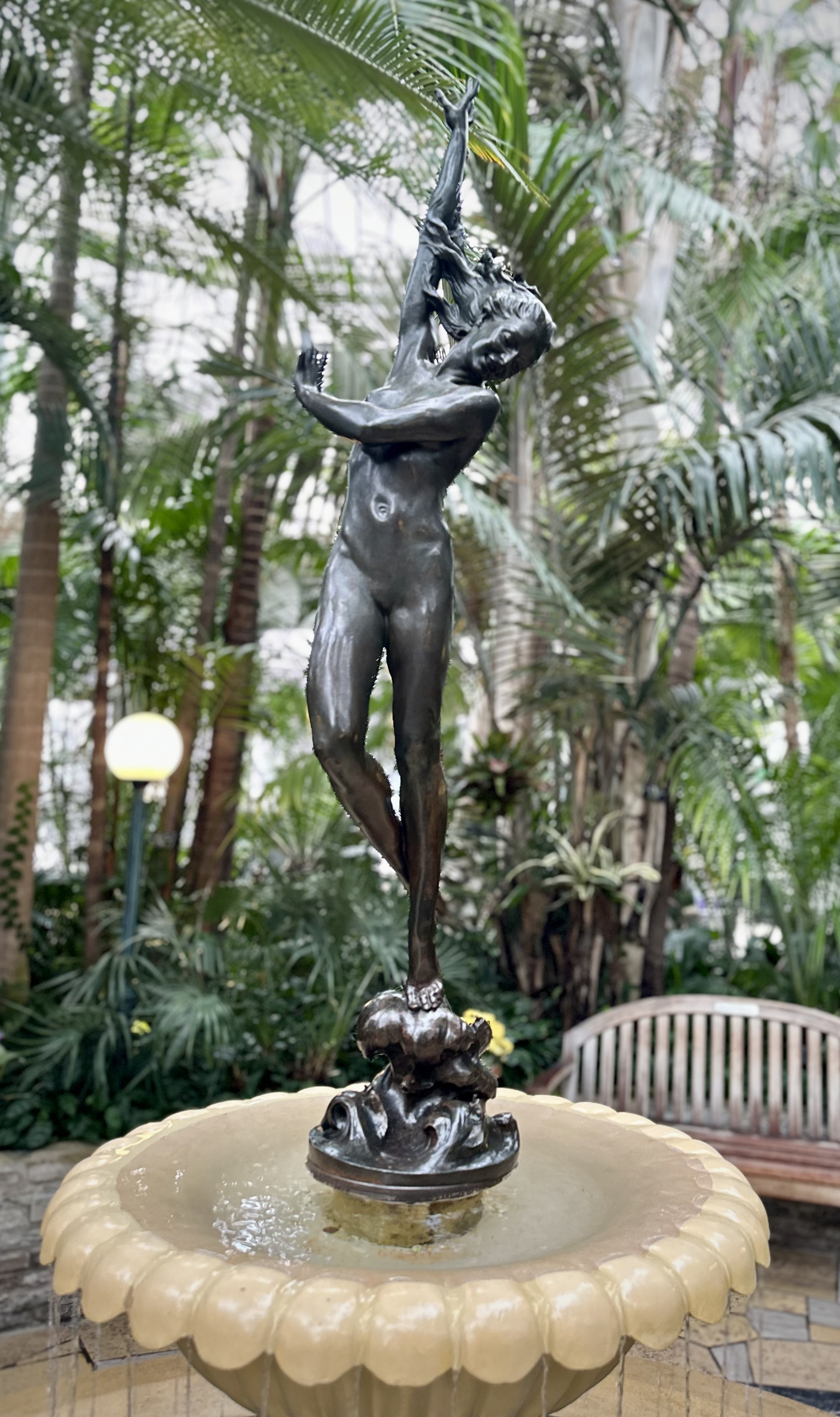
Detail, Crest at the Wave (1929) Como Park, Zoo, and Conservatory, Saint Paul, Minnesota

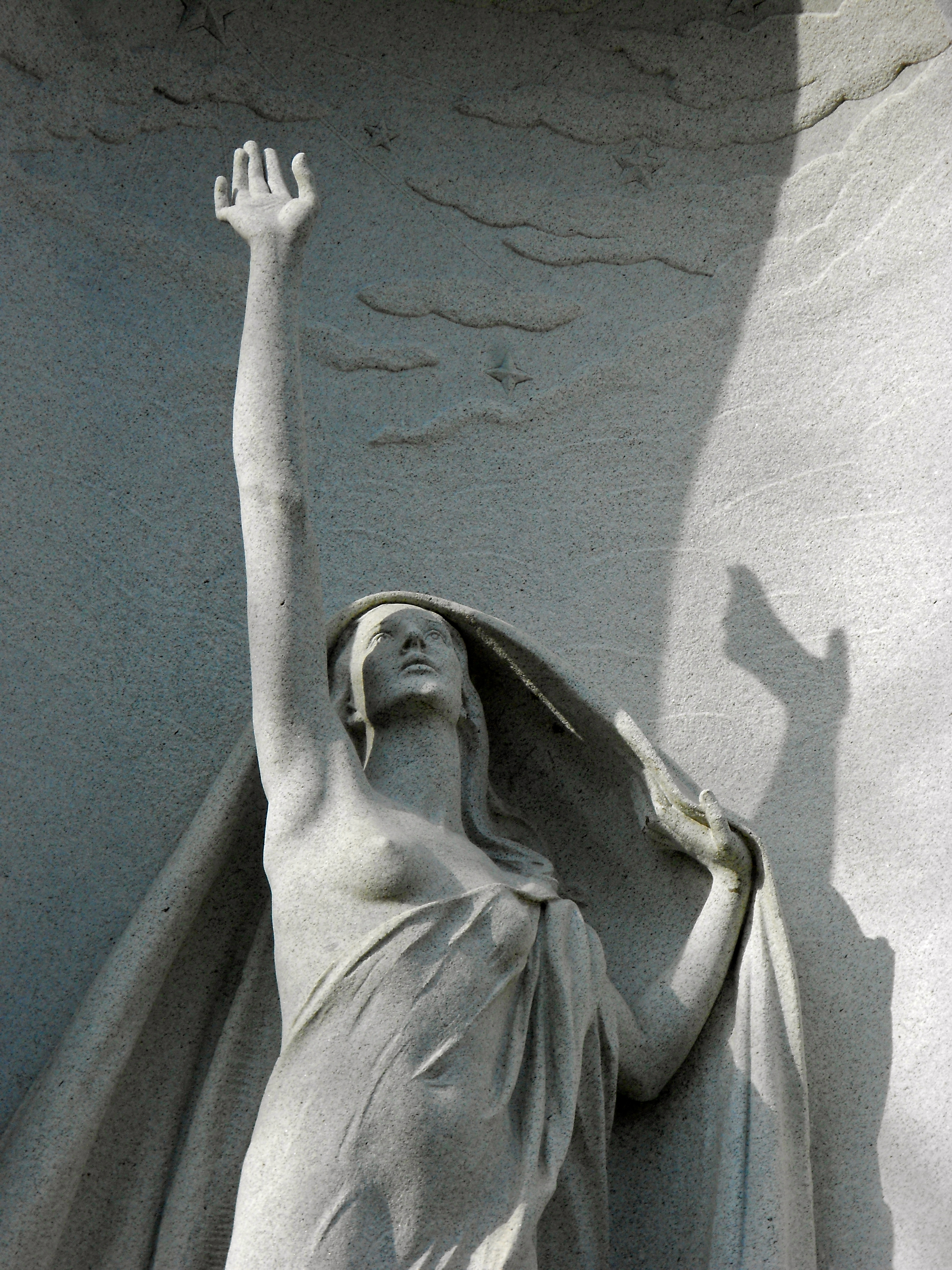
Aspiration (1933), Laurel Hill Cemetery, Philadelphia, Pennsylvania.
