= Farmington Historic District (Farmington, Michigan) =

Historic district in Michigan, United States

- U.S. National Register of Historic Places
- U.S. Historic district
- Michigan State Historic Site
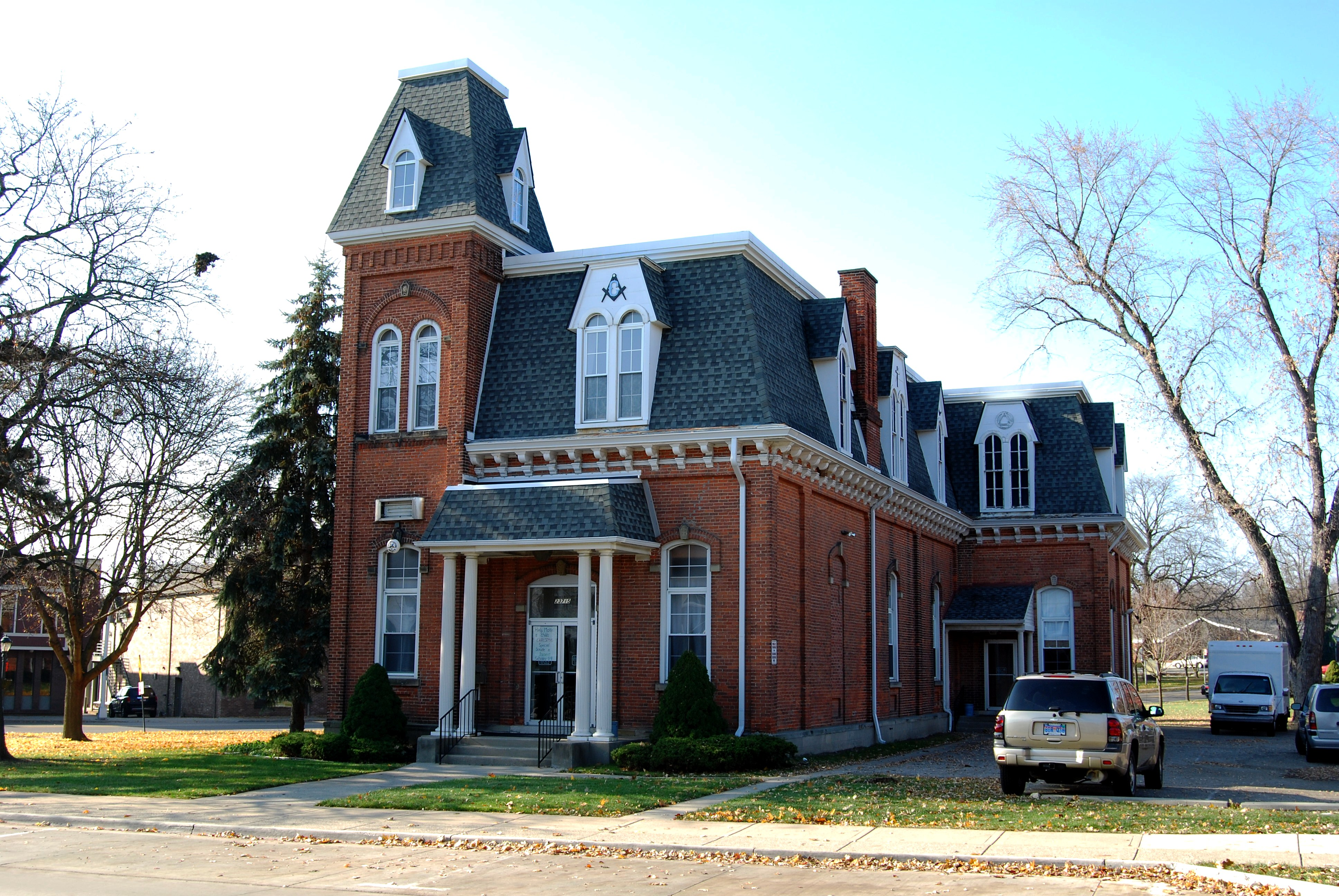
- The Masonic Lodge is near the center of this historic district and was previously used as the city hall

- Location within Michigan Location within the United States

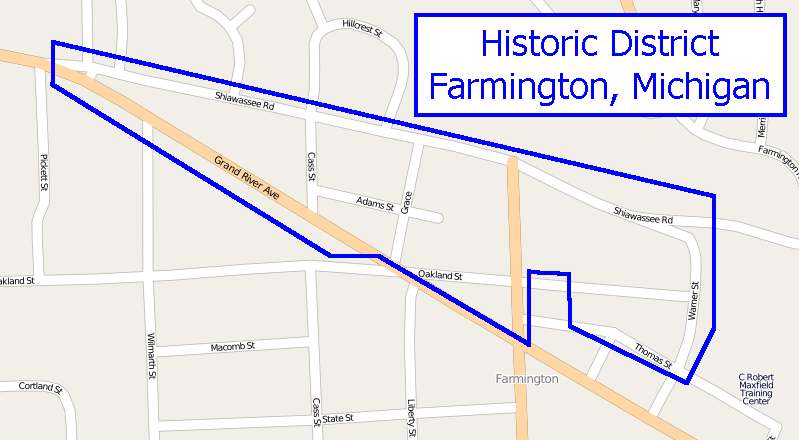
- Boundaries of the district
- Location: Grand River Ave and Shiawassee Ave from Warner St to Jct, Farmington, Michigan
- Coordinates: 42°27′56″N 83°22′41″W
- Area: 35 acres (14 ha)
- Built: 1823
- Architect: Johnson S. Prall
- Architectural style: Greek Revival, Late Victorian
- NRHP reference No.: 76001034
- Added to NRHP: June 18, 1976

Farmington Historic District is the town center of Farmington, Michigan. It was listed on the National Register of Historic Places in 1976. The area roughly corresponds to the section of Grand River Avenue and Shiawassee Avenue from Warner Street to junction of Grand River and Shiawassee.

== History ==
In 1823, Arthur Power, a devout Quaker originally from Farmington, New York, purchased a number of tracts of land in this area. He moved to Michigan in 1824 with his family, and a number of other Quaker families followed suit. By 1826, the location of the village of Farmington was firmly established along Shiawassee Trail, and the settlement boasted at least three churches, a school, two taverns, and several other merchants. There were also several dairies and cheese factories, a small foundry, and at least four lumber and grist mills. A number of residences - some still extant - were constructed in the "Old City" area of Farmington. By the mid-1840s, the village center shifted from Shiawassee Trail to Grand River.

The village grew rapidly from about 1850 to 1890, with the original Quaker influence gradually diminishing as new settlers moved in. The surrounding agricultural industry was the dominant economic driver for the area. A disastrous fire struck in 1872, destroying many businesses in the commercial district. After 1890, Farmington continued to grow as technology and transportation evolved, but even by 1950 the population was only 2300. By 1960, with the exodus from Detroit, that number had grown to over 7000, and reached 12000 by the mid-1970s.

== Description ==
The Farmington Historic District is triangular in shape, and consists primarily of residential buildings, with the remainder mostly commercial in nature. Some structures date back to the 1840s, with a great may farm houses and modest Greek Revival structures.

The district includes some significant buildings in Farmington:

- Governor Fred M. Warner House, a symmetric, block shaped house with a low hipped roof topped by a cupola, built in 1867.
- The Masonic Lodge (formerly Township Hall), a two-story building with towers, corbels, arched doorways and a mansard roof in patterned slate, completed in 1876.
- Farmington Civic Theatre

== Gallery ==
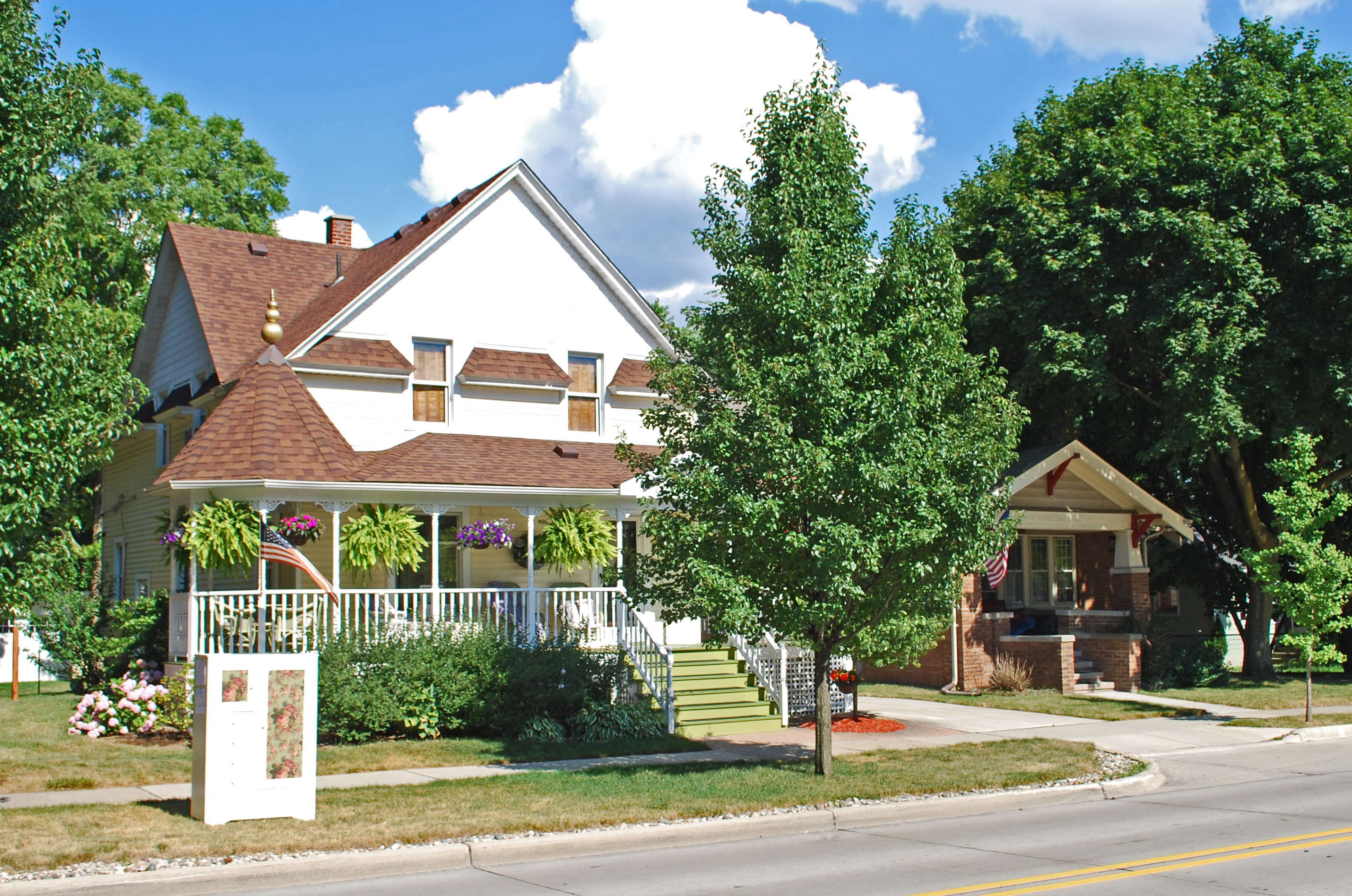
Houses on Farmington Road

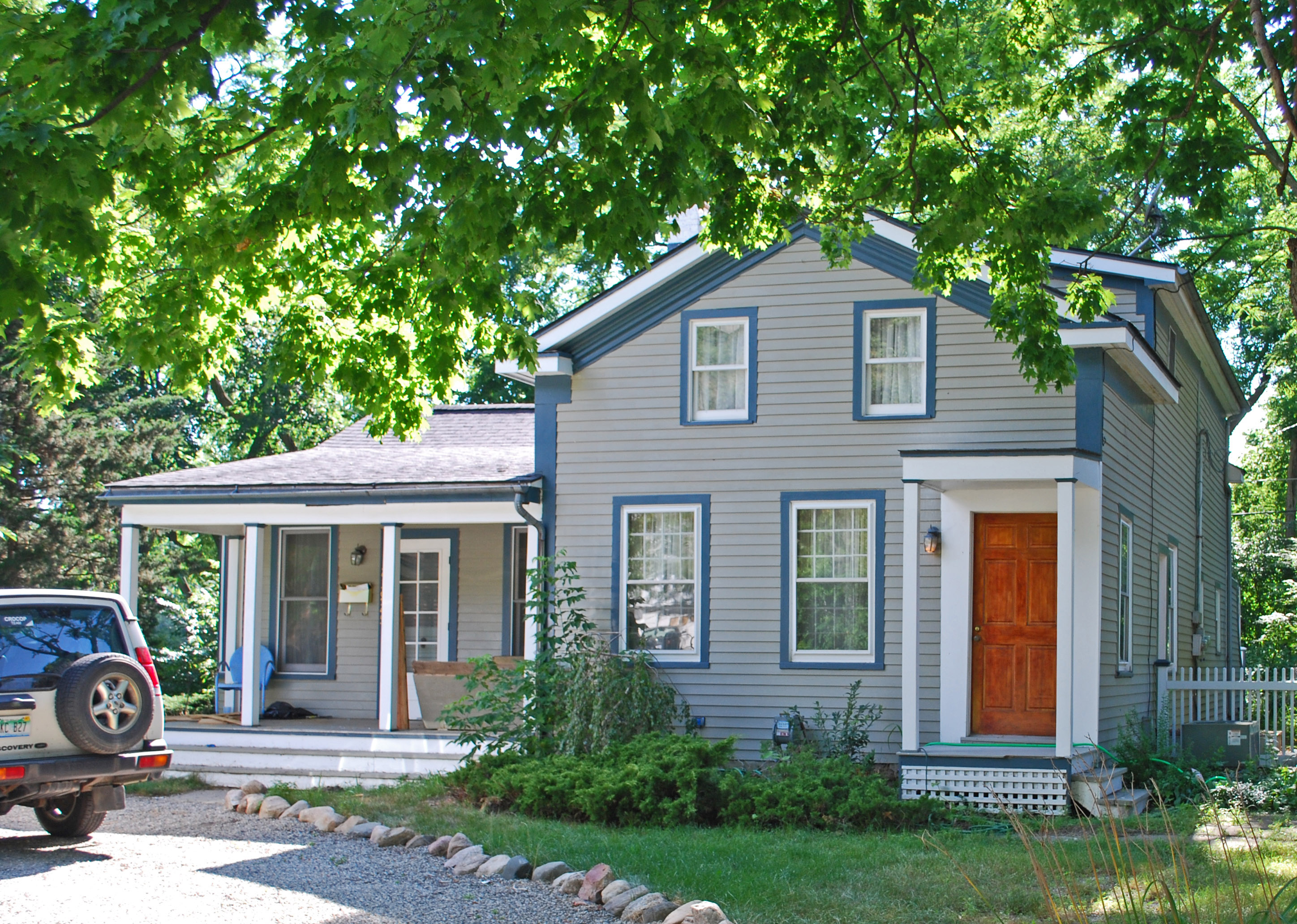
House on Farmington Road

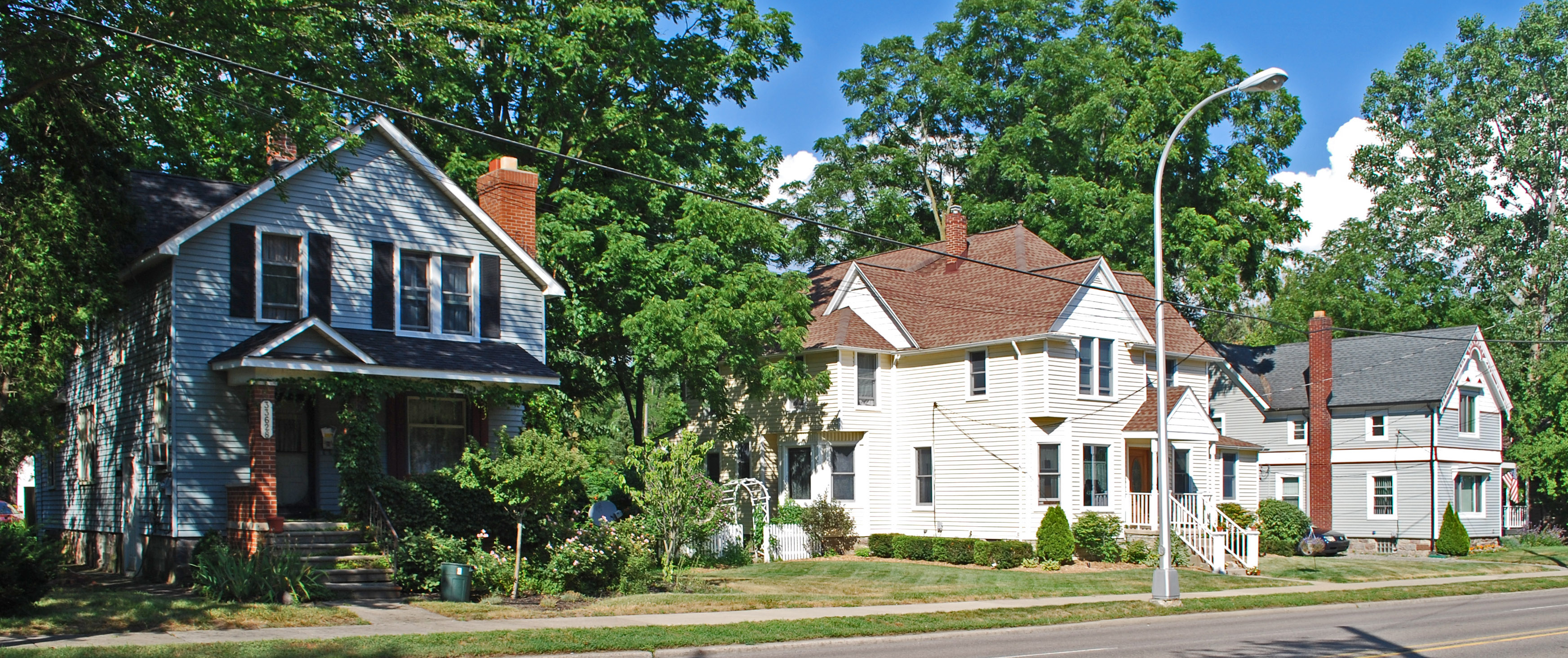
Houses on Grand River

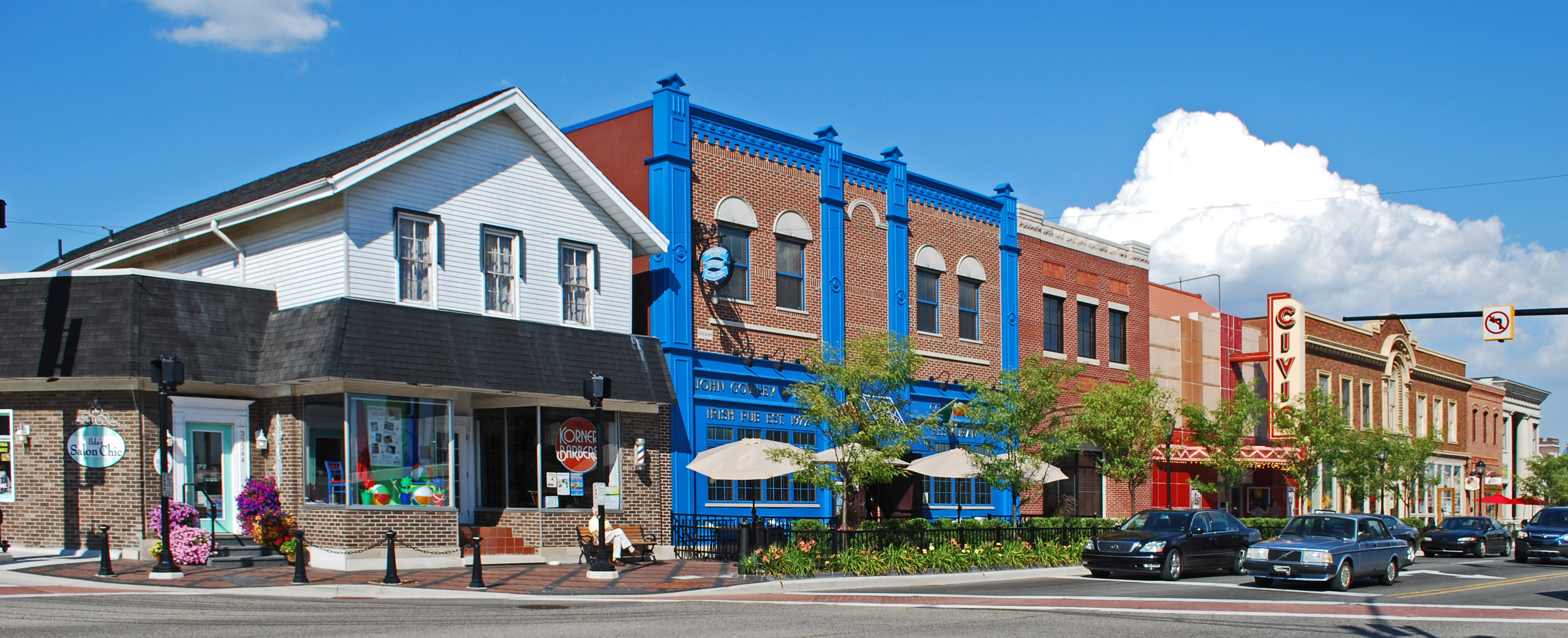
Commercial Buildings on Grand River

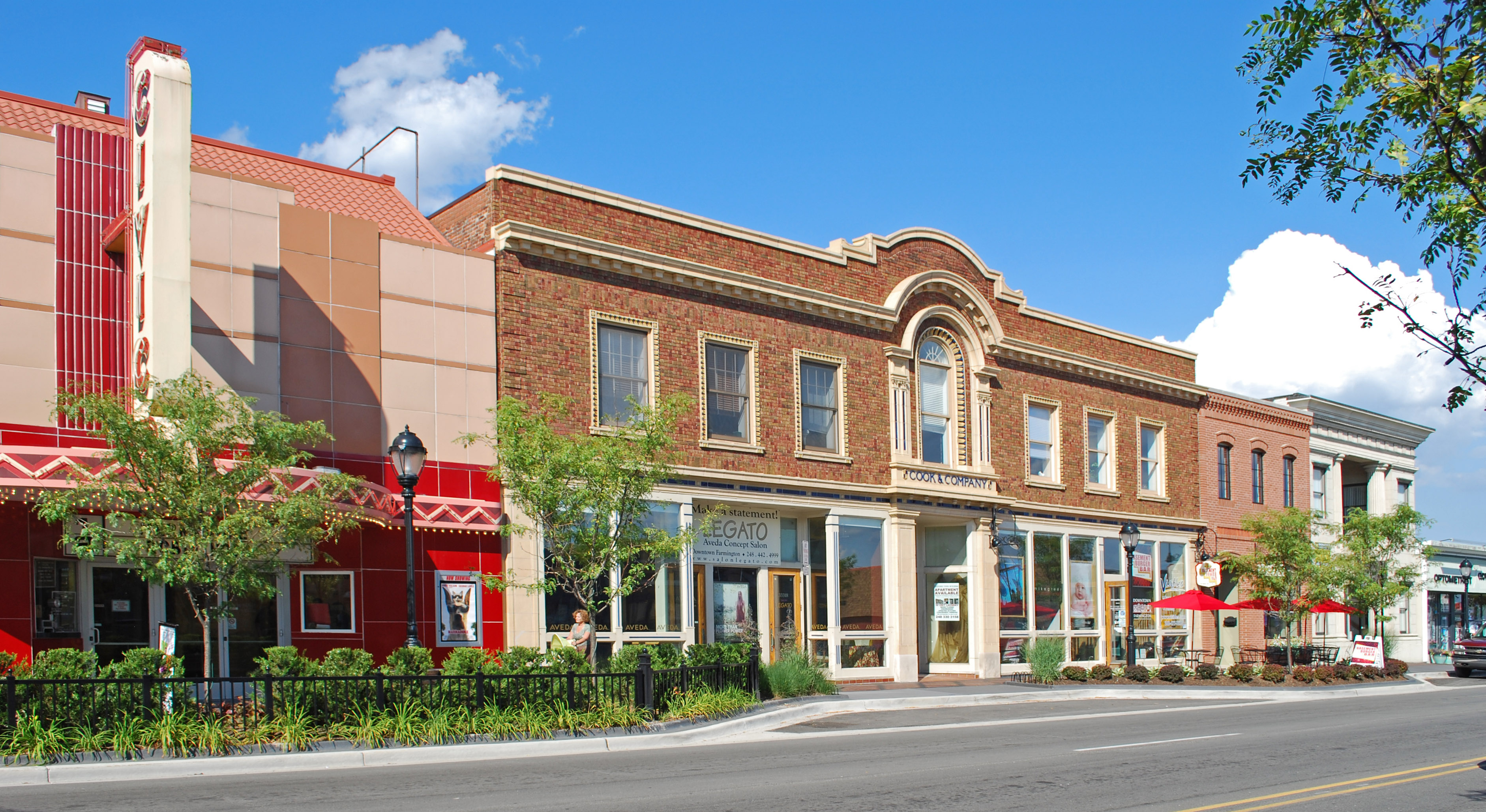
Commercial Buildings on Grand River

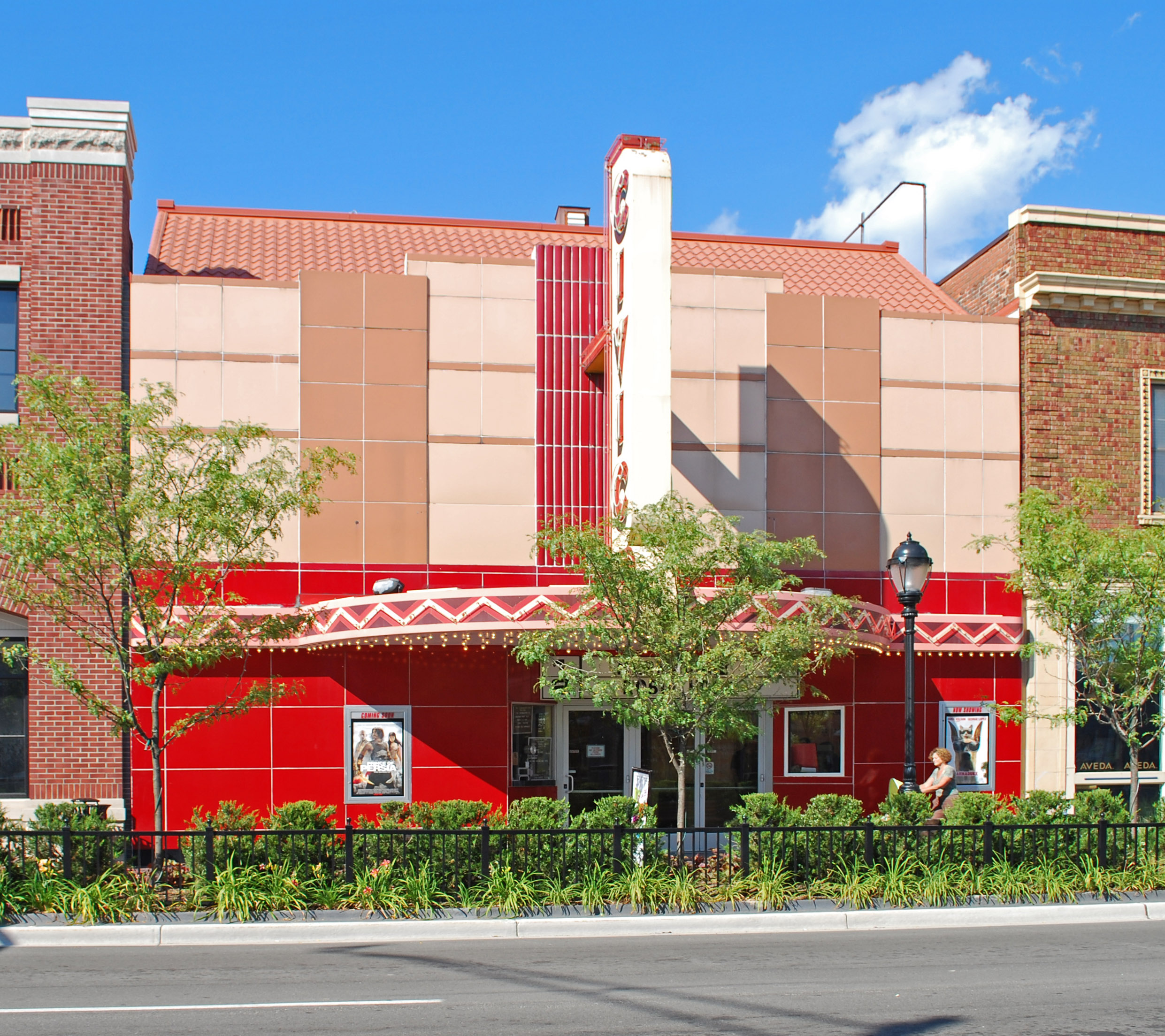
Commercial Buildings on Grand River

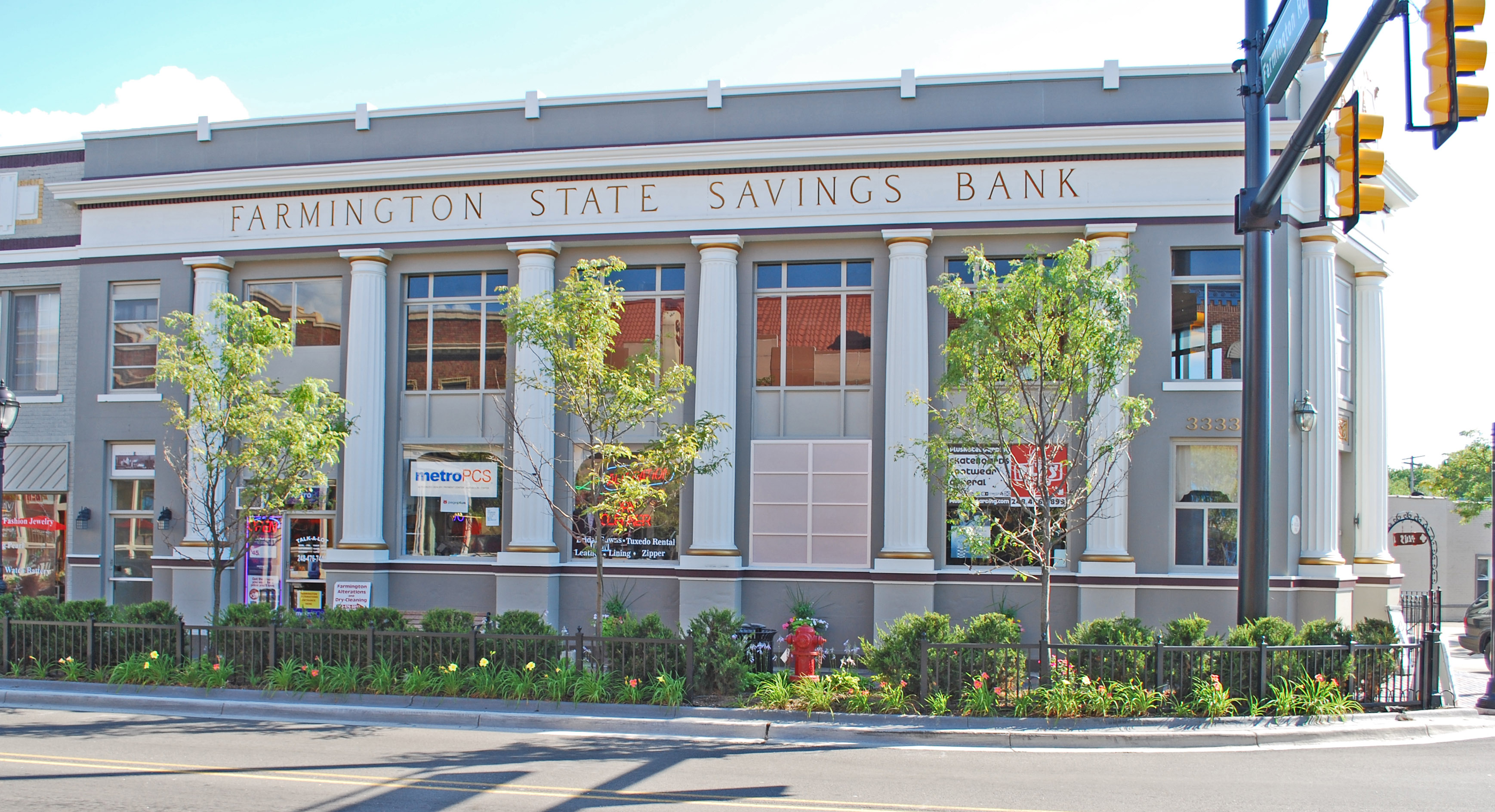
Commercial Buildings on Grand River

== See also ==
- National Register of Historic Places listings in Oakland County, Michigan
