= Civic =

Civic is something related to a city or municipality.

Civic or CIVIC can also refer to:

== General ==
- Honda Civic, a car produced by the Honda Motor Co.
- Civics, the science of comparative government
- Civic engagement, the connection one feels with their larger community
- Civic center, a community focal point
- Civic nationalism
- Civic Theatre (disambiguation), a name given to a number of theatres around the world
- Civic virtue

== Specific places ==
- Civic, Christchurch, a Category II heritage building in the Christchurch Central City
- Civic, Australian Capital Territory, the central business district of Canberra, Australia

== Music ==
- Civic (band), an Australian rock band

== Other ==
- Campaign for Innocent Victims in Conflict (CIVIC), a humanitarian organization
- Citizens Independent Vice Investigating Committee (CIVIC), an organization from Los Angeles, California, United States

== See also ==
- Civil (disambiguation), civilian
- City
- Citizen
