= Artem Metelev =

Russian politician

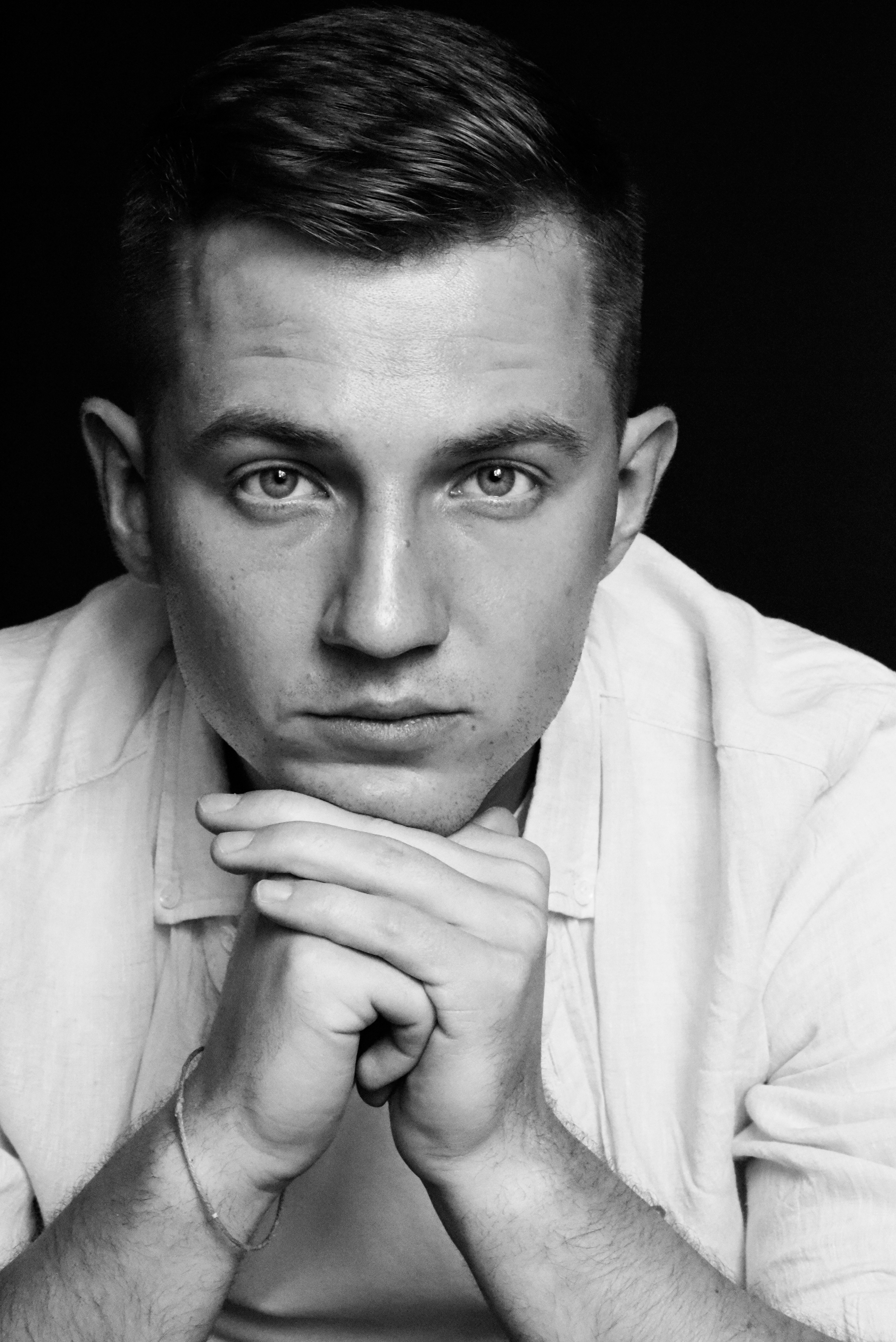

Chairman of the State Duma committee on youth policy
- In office 12 October 2021 – 30 September 2026
- Preceded by: new position
- Succeeded by: Vladislav Golovin

Deputy of the State Duma Russia
- In office 19 September 2021 – 20 September 2026
- Constituency: Moscow

Member of the Public Chamber of Russia
- In office 20 March 2017 – 19 September 2021
- Head of the Chamber: Valery Fadeev; Lidiya Mikheeva
- Succeeded by: Natalia Moskvitina

Personal details
- Born: 11 August 1993 (age 33) Zelenograd, Russia
- Party: United Russia
- Education: State University of Management, Moscow State Pedagogical University, Russian Presidential Academy of National Economy and Public Administration
- Profession: Manager
- Website: Artyom Metelev's official website
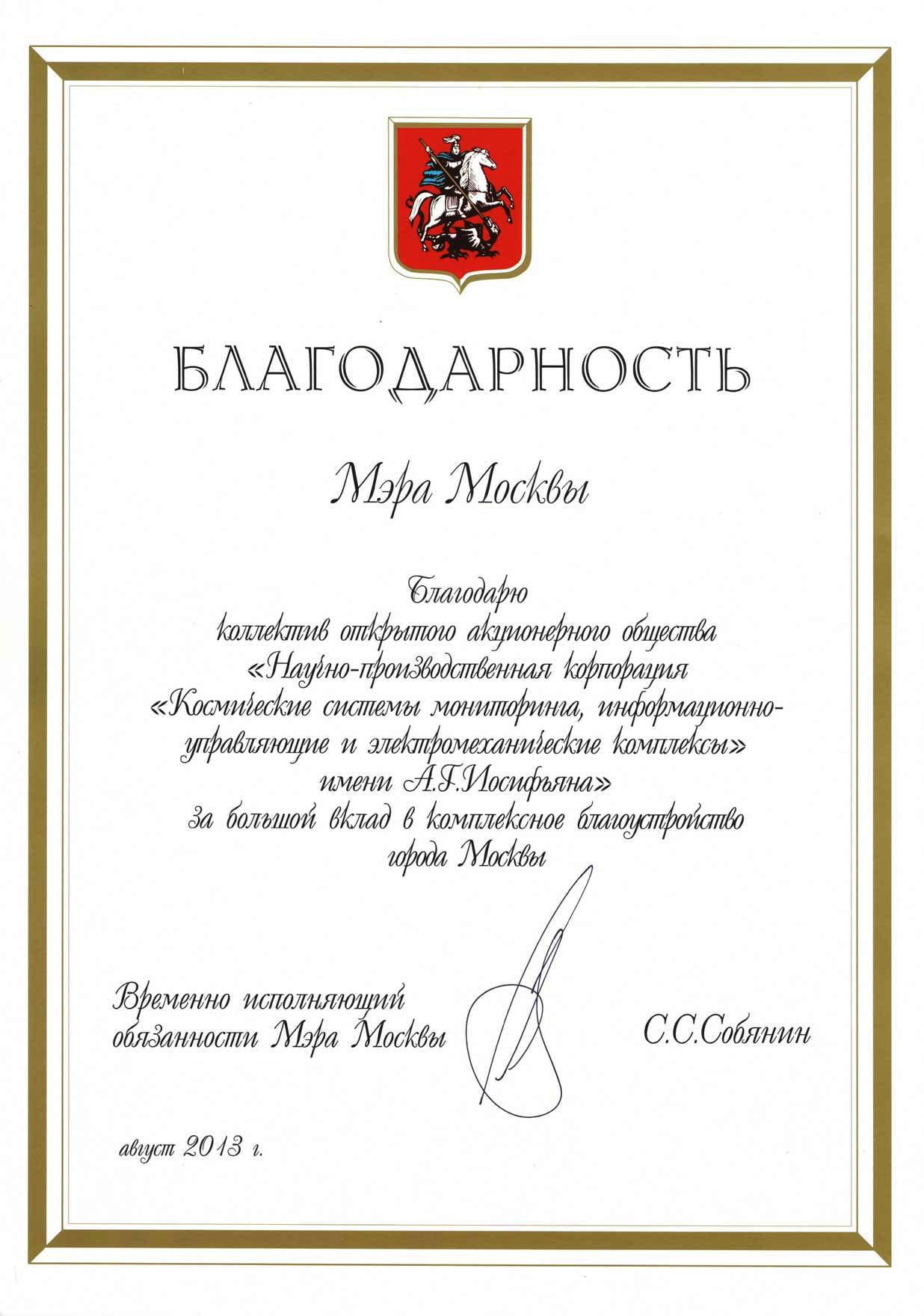
- Awards

Artem Pavlovich Metelev (Russian: Артем Павлович Метелев; born 11 August 1993, Zelenograd, Russia) is a Russian public figure.

Сhairman of the State Duma of Russia committee on youth policy (since 12 October 2021 to 30 September 2026 year). Member of the Public Chamber of Russia (from 20 March 2017 – 19 September 2021).

Chairman of the Board of the Association of Volunteer Centers Russia.

== Biography ==
Artyom Pavlovich Metelev was born 11 August 1993 in the city of Zelenograd.

In 2015, he graduated from the State University of Management, with a degree in management in the Fuel and Energy Complex. In 2017, he completed a program in «psychological and pedagogical education» in Moscow Pedagogical State University, master's degree. In 2021, he completed the Master of Public Policy training program at the RANEPA. In 2026 he completed his completed special training for managers and executives studies at the Russian Academy of National Economy and Public Administration.

Since school years, he participated in the activities of children's and youth public associations.

From 2009 to 2012, Metelev he was as the chairman of the Youth Public Chamber of the Silino District city Moscow and as a curator of the Youth Parliament project in city Zelenograd.

In 2012, he became the curator of the directions for the adaptation of orphans and people with disabilities of the public organization Union of Volunteers of Russia.

In 2010–2013, Metelev was the deputy head of the district branch of the Young Guard of United Russia in the Zelenograd administrative district of Moscow.

In 2013–2014, he was the coordinator of the direction of the public movement, in 2014 he was the head of the Russian shift at the Seliger Youth Forum.

He began his career in the field of youth policy Russia, working with young people, volunteers, and non-profit youth organizations.

In 2014–2015, he was a specialist in the Department of Patriotic Projects and Regional Cooperation at the Russian Center for Civic and Patriotic Education of Children and Youth.

In 2015–2016, he the position specialist in the Development Department at the Russian Center for Civic and Patriotic Education of Children and Youth.

In 2016, he worked as the curator at the Russian Center for Civic and Patriotic Education of Children and Youth.

In 2016–2017, he was an Adviser to the Chairman of the Council of the Association of Volunteer Centers of Russia.

In 2017, he worked as co-chairman of the Association of Volunteer Centers of Russia.

From 3 December 2017, to the present – chairman of the board of the Association of Volunteer Centers Russia, the largest volunteer community. It unites more than 1,000 member organizations regions of Russia.

In 2017, he was a member of the Organizing and National Preparatory Committees of the XIX World Festival of Youth and Students, In 2018 – deputy head of the directorate for the Year of the Volunteer in the Russian Federation, in 2024, he became a member of the organizing committee of The World Youth Festival.

From 20 March 2017 to 19 September 2021 – member of the Public Chamber of Russia, deputy chairman of the Commission Public Chamber of Russia for Youth Development and Volunteering.

In 2016–2021, he was a member of the Coordinating Council of the Russian School Movement.

Since 2020, he has been a member colleguu of the Federal Agency for Youth Affairs and a member of the State Council of the Russian Federation commission on Youth Affairs.

In 2021 year he victory in the All-Russian competition managers «Leaders of Russia».

On April 16, 2021 Metelev announced his decision to participate in the primaries party «United Russia» to subsequently nominate his candidacy from the city of Moscow for the election of deputies of the State Duma Russia of the VIII convocation and in May, he won the preliminary vote.

On September 19, 2021, Metelev was elected to the State Duma of Russia from Moscow.

From 19 September 2021 to 20 September 2026 year – deputy of the State Duma Russia.

From 12 October 2021 to 30 September 2026 year – chairman of the State Duma Russia Committee on Youth Policy.

Since 2021 to 2026 year – member of the United Russia faction in the Russian State Duma.

From the end 2021 year – member party United Russia.

Since November 2021, he has been a member of the «United Russia» party's General Council Commission on Education and Science.

From 2022 year – member of the Coordinating Council of the Russian movement of children and youth.

Since mid-2022, he has been a member Council of the «Mashuk» Federal educational center.

On April 25, 2026, Metelev that I have made a decision become a candidate deputies of the State Duma Russia from the Krasnodar Kray 2026 Russian legislative election and submitted documents to participate in the primaries party United Russia. According to the results of the primaries, Metelev took 8th place according to the list in Kuban and in the Southwestern District of the same region, where he took the last, 14th place.

On September 20, 2026, following the results of the parliamentary elections, he did not make it into the State Duma of the ninth convocation.

On September 30, 2026, he resigned from his position as chairman of the State Duma Committee on Youth Policy.

=== Volunteer activities ===
In 2017 he created and launched the platform dobro, for a volunteers which was presented to Russian President Vladimir Putin. Volunteer platform has become the largest volunteer platform in the CIS and the world, with more than 9 million volunteers and 100,000 projects, over 130,000 organizations that organize volunteer activities in Russia and around the world. The total amount of hours spent on good deeds by 2022-2026 amounted to more than 30 million., he consolidated more than 59,000 public and non-profit organizations, youth policy workers, young people, and volunteers on the platform.

As chairman of the board of the Association of Volunteer Centers of Russia, he and the team is work includes launching the development of volunteerism in the Russia, social franchise Center for Community Development and Support of Volunteer, Charitable, and Civic Initiatives, implementing an educational program where students complete projects with non-profit organizations, government entities, and companies, organizing the annual International Award for Civic Engagement alongside regional participant clubs, managing humanitarian missions, and collaborating with United Nations employees regarding volunteerism.

He took a direct part in popularizing and increasing the volunteer movement 6 times from 2014 to 2026. He led the Organizing Committee for the All-Russian Volunteer of Russia Competition and the International Award for 8 years.

In 2014, he became the head of the Medical Volunteers project. By 2016, the project had become federal and had more than 40 regions of presence, thousands of young doctors in its ranks, and hundreds of hospitals and partner universities. In 2016, Veronika Skvortsova, Minister of Health of Russia, attended the Founding Congress of the VOD «Medical Volunteers».

=== Legislative activity ===
Since 2021, during the term of office of the State Duma Russia deputy, he has authored and co-authored 18 legislative initiatives and amendments to draft federal laws. Including:

Became the initiator of the bill on compensation payments to volunteers injured in the course of their activities.

Became one of the authors of the law "On the Russian Movement of children and youth".

Became the initiator of the bill on the abolition of personal income tax for financial assistance to students of colleges and universities.

Became the initiator of the bill on simplification of the mechanism of employment of minors.

Became one of the authors of the initiative on preferential visits to cultural institutions for volunteers and volunteers.

Became one of the authors of the initiative to compensate the costs of communication services to volunteers.

He became one of the authors of an initiative that allows orphans to register at the address of the local administration before receiving their own housing

Became a co-author of the initiative on the transfer of confiscated goods to charity.

In the summer of 2022, Metelev submitted a legislative initiative to the Russian Government, which would involve the government and business in building creative clusters, art spaces, youth centers and coworking spaces in Russian cities and regions, in order to prevent the outflow of young people from small towns to big cities, and to develop youth policy infrastructure. He proposed extending public-private and municipal-private partnerships to the construction and maintenance of youth centers.

In 2023, he launched the Youth Rights Protection Center under Russia. The human rights organization will become a single window for young people who need legal support.

In January 2023, he said that he plans to develop development of a law on student self-government, initiatives to improve the effectiveness of youth parliaments, youth public chambers and public associations.

In 2023, he sent to the Government of Russia draft law on fixing in collective agreements of companies with employees measures to support corporate volunteering with the possibility of providing a paid day to participate in social projects. An amendment is planned to the Labor Code of Russia.

В In March 2023, under his leadership, the committee for Youth Policy supported the approach to tobacco regulation in the country and reflected in the conclusion the need to finalize it for the second reading in terms of restricting the sale of vapes. In 2026, the Russian Government supported Metelev's initiative and approved a bill banning the sale of vapes in Russian regions. The ban is planned to be extended from 2027, and regional authorities will have the right to introduce it.

On March 7, 2023, Metelev announced the preparation of a bill to combat live broadcasts in which the host performs shocking, dangerous, humiliating, or other controversial actions. In November 2023, the Russian Government prepared positive feedback on a package of Legislative projects introducing penalties for trash streams, and the law on liability for trash streaming was later signed by the President of the Russian Federation.

In March 2024, he became a co-author of the bill., which, at the federal and regional levels, will form a unified approach to the concept and content of mentoring for each professional branch in Russia.

On 24 April 2024, he participated in the development of a new draft law on amendments to Articles 29 and 39 of the Federal Law on Education in the Russian Federation, aimed at supporting students and student families in terms of providing them with places in dormitories.

On 2 September 2024, he stated that it was proposed to supplement the Federal Law «On Youth Policy in Russia» with new areas of youth policy: socio-psychological assistance, development of initiative budgeting, social sports and support for young scientists.

On 12 November 2024, Metelev initiated a new draft law concerning the development of foodsharing and commodity charity in Russia.

In April 2025, he announced the continuation of work on the anti-bullying law in Russia. At Metelev's suggestion, schools may be required to keep records of bullying among schoolchildren and youth cases and implement anti-bullying measures. Metelev also authored a bill on countering bullying in the teenage environment. According to the initiative, bullies and their parents will be referred to a psychologist and attract in volunteer projects. The decision will be made by the Commission for Minors and the Protection of Their Rights. Additionally, the agency will have the authority to take preventive measures in cases of bullying.

In October 2025, he talked about, that the State Duma will introduce a bill on the prevention of problem gambling.

In November 2025, Metelev developed his own bill banning the sale of pit bikes to minors without providing a certificate that the child has completed or is undergoing training at a motorcycle school.

At the end of 2025, he proposed banning the sale of gasoline to minors in the Russian Federation.

In June 2026, he announced that the Russian parliament was working on a bill against the promotion of online casinos.

=== Humanitarian activities ===
In 2020, he became a co-organizer of the all-Russian action of mutual assistance, aimed at supporting elderly, disabled citizens, citizens of the Russian Federation and medical staff during the coronavirus pandemic. In March 2020, during COVID-19 pandemics together with the People's Front and Medical Volunteers, the project organized the work of regional volunteer headquarters, attracted more than 9 thousand partners, launched a single hotline and website, resulting in targeted assistance to more than 7 million citizens. The activities of the volunteer headquarters were organized Metelev and the team of his Association throughout Russia: food delivery to elderly people staying at home, medicines to citizens, assistance in hospitals, psychological support for those in self-isolation, remote legal consultations, volunteers helped doctors in the "red zones" of hospitals.

In February 2022, Metelev flew to Rostov region to assist the headquarters in coordinating volunteers and collecting humanitarian aid for the residents of Donbass. From February 2022 he attracted volunteers, young people and the majority of public youth organizations and Non-profit organization to participate in volunteer activities and humanitarian missions in the Donbas area to provide assistance to the civilian population. With the participation of Metelev and the staff of his Association, the Russian Red Cross and the Russian Ministry of Emergency Situations, work was organized to provide during this period assistance to the civilian population. The activities of the volunteers of humanitarian missions have covered several areas: the delivery of humanitarian kits, food, medicines to residents, the provision of social and psychological support to those in need. A collection of humanitarian aid was organized and a team of volunteers was formed to provide assistance to the population. Together with the Rus food bank, reserves were formed from donors, manufacturers of food and basic necessities, and the possibilities of issuing food cards with Magnit and other retail chains were being explored. The Volunteerism Resource Center coordinated the activities of 250 volunteers.

In 2024, Metelev, together with a team from the Association of Volunteer Centers of Russia, visited temporary accommodation facilities in the Kursk region, and 35 tons of humanitarian cargo were delivered to residents of the region. Assistance was collected at the request of the evacuees: five hundred sets of bed linen, mattresses and clothes, three hundred kilograms of pet food were bought.

At the end of 2024-2025, during the oil spill in the Black Sea, he arrived to Anapa to meet with volunteers and find out what problems they had in providing assistance and organizing work to eliminate the consequences.

In 2026, Metelev and the team of his Association took part in providing assistance to residents of Dagestan affected by the flood: supported volunteers, and the initiative «Let's Help Dagestan Together» was launched. Marketplace users could request help through a special page on the RWB company. The purchased goods were delivered to pick-up points in Dagestan, and volunteers delivered them to those in need.

In the spring of 2026, Disaster oil terminal disaster and the oil products ended up in the river in city of Tuapse. Metelev, together with the «United Russia» party, organized assistance to the municipality to eliminate the consequences: a single volunteer headquarters was formed on the spot, a collection of volunteers was announced, the headquarters distributes tasks and provides volunteers with personal protective equipment.

=== Project activities ===
Metelev the creator of the project about social comfort. The project fights for the fair distribution of food and goods, the protection of volunteers who risk their lives, the opportunity for orphans to live in a family, and the reduction of unemployment for young people. The project plans to draw attention to solving such social issues as the situation of disabled people, homeless animals, and the protection of students' rights in Russia.

== Hobbies ==
He was engaged in professional sports (judo, sport swimming, rugby).

In childhood and adolescence, Artyom was an actor, played roles in the theater, participated in various castings, i wanted to become a businessman and won a competition for young entrepreneurs in Moscow, develope a model of a fitness center, attended clubs, studied English, studied at a music school

== Awards ==
- Decoration "For Beneficence" (12 October 2020) — for his active participation in the preparation and holding on the territory Russia of the All-Russian action of mutual Assistance during the coronavirus pandemic.
- Gratitude of the President of the Russian Federation — «for active participation in the socio-political life of Russian society».
- Commemorative medal and diploma of the President of the Russian Federation — «for selfless contribution to the organization of the All-Russian action of mutual assistance».
- Commemorative medal of the President of the Russian Federation XIX World Festival of Youth and Students 2017 in Sochi.
- Honorary badge of the Federal Agency for Youth Affairs — «for merits in the field of state youth policy ».
- Winner of the All-Russian competition «Leaders of Russia. Politics».
- Letter of thanks from the Mayor of Moscow — «for active public activity and a great personal contribution to the development of volunteerism in Moscow».
- Letter of thanks from the Minister of Energy of the Russian Federation.
- Letter of thanks from the Deputy Minister of Education and Science Russia.
- Letter of thanks from the Head of the Federal Agency for Youth. Affairs;
- Letter of thanks from the Director of the Russian Center for Civic and Patriotic Education of Children and Youth.
- In 2021 Artyom Metelev entered the top 100 promising young people up to 30 years old according to Forbes (category Social practices).

== Sources ==
- An article. To save food and feed the hungry: the "APPROVED" project campaign for the development of food-sharing in the Russian Federation has been launched
- Film of the Approved project is about the importance of foodsharing development in Russia
