= The Civic =

The Civic may refer to:

- The Civic, Christchurch, an historic building in Christchurch, New Zealand
- The Civic, Barnsley, a theatre and art gallery in Barnsley, Yorkshire, UK
- Civic Theatre (disambiguation), several theatres
