= Farmington Winery (Michigan) =

Winery

Coordinates: 42.45643°N 83.35766°W

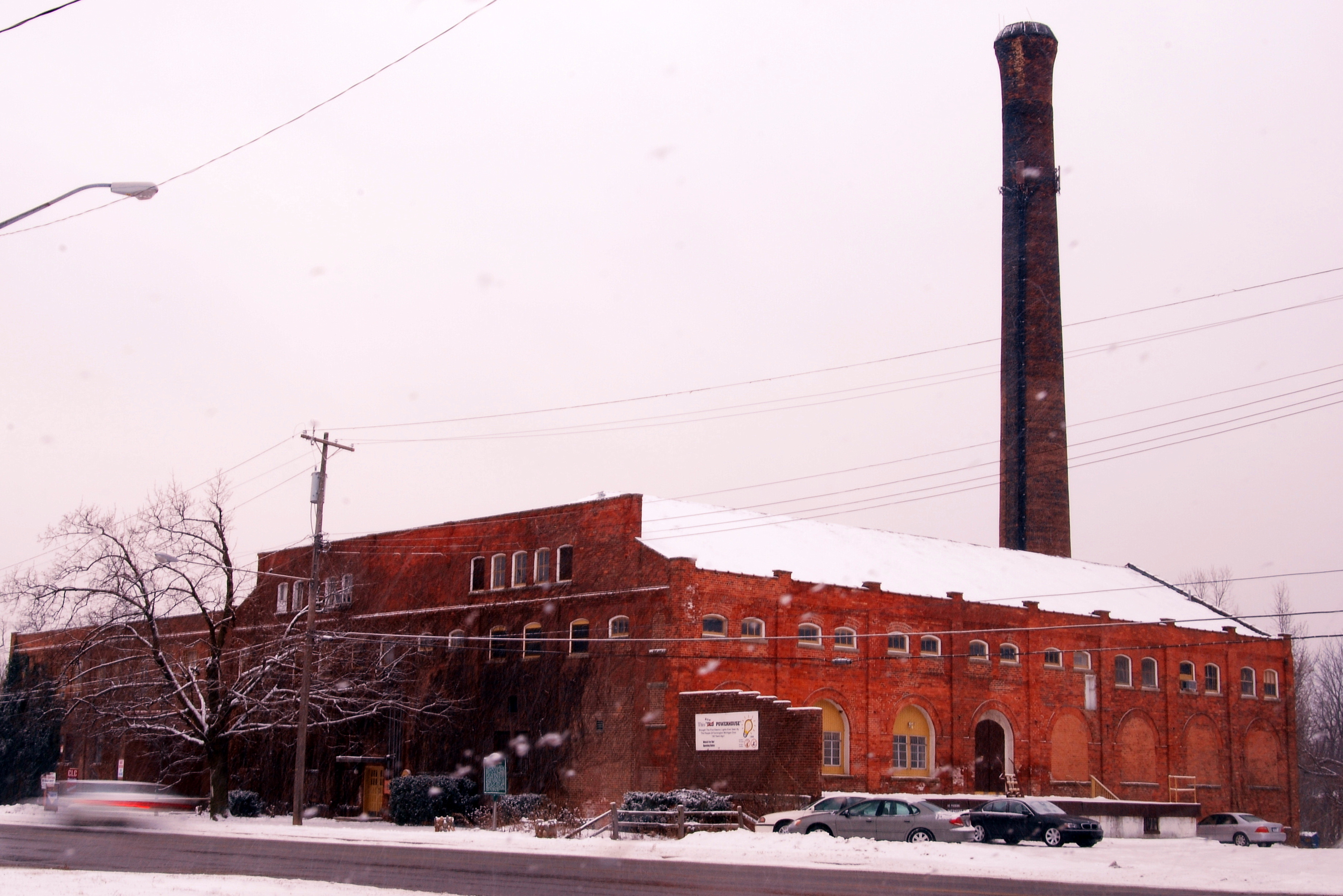
- Interactive map of the Farmington Winery area

General information
- Location: 31505 Grand River Ave. Farmington, MI
- Completed: 1899

The Farmington Winery was the former LaSalle Winery which was operated in the converted Detroit United Railway Powerhouse in Farmington, Michigan. Production ceased in the late 1960s and the building was used primarily as a distribution center. Later, the St Julian Winery purchased the LaSalle brand. The property and building are owned and operated by the J.S. White family, who purchased the shuttered winery building in the mid 1970s and currently restore and maintain the building. Parts of the building have been converted into office and retail space. Each Halloween the building is used by the Whites as a popular haunted house and is then known as "The Haunted Winery".

The chimney of the building has been cited by the Detroit Free Press as a major migration stop for Chimney Swifts, potentially the largest in North America.
