= Maude Sherwood Jewett =

American sculptor (1875–1953)

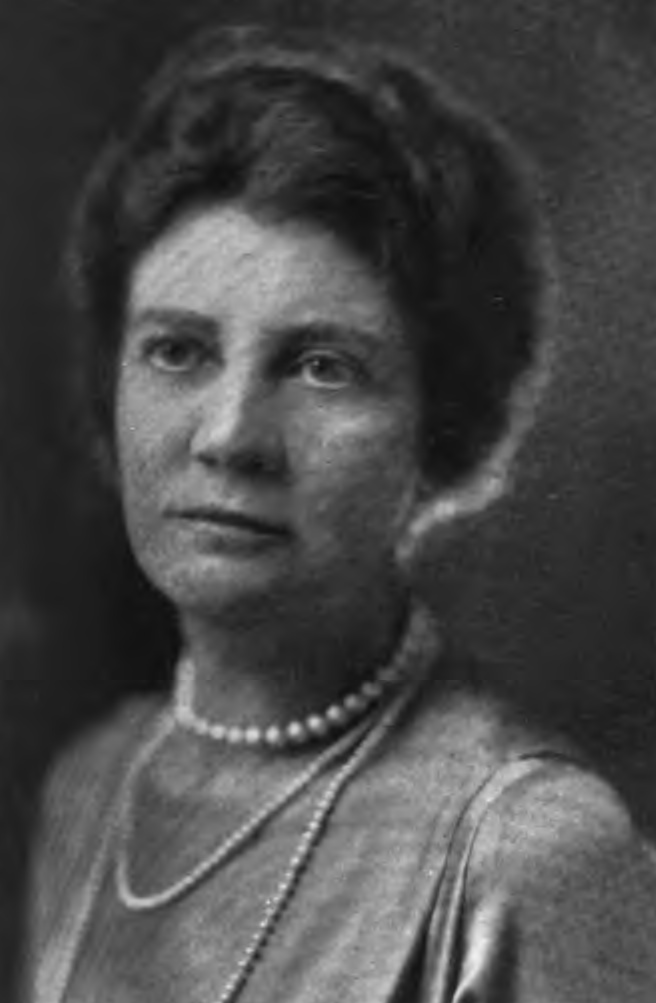
- Jewett in 1927
- Born: June 6, 1875; Englewood Cliffs, New Jersey
- Died: 1953 (aged 77–78)
- Style: Sculpture

Maude Sherwood Jewett (June 6, 1875 – 1953) was an American sculptor.

Born in Englewood Cliffs, New Jersey, Jewett was a graduate of the Art Students League of New York who studied with Harriet Whitney Frishmuth. Beginning in 1910 she kept a summer cottage in East Hampton, New York, called the Ink Pot, whose grounds she decorated with her own work; it soon became a gathering place for artists. With her husband, Edward Hull Jewett, she had two children, Edward Jr. and John Howard. Jewett's work may be seen in the Cleveland Museum of Art, which owns a fountain to her design, and on East Hampton's Soldiers and Sailors War Memorial; she also crafted a number of sundials.
