= Civic Theatre =

Civic Theatre may refer to:

== Australia ==
- Civic Theatre, Adelaide (1932–1957), in Hindley Street, formerly the Wondergraph
- Newcastle Civic Theatre, Newcastle, New South Wales
- Wagga Wagga Civic Theatre, Wagga Wagga, New South Wales

== Ireland ==
- Civic Theatre (Tallaght), Dublin

== New Zealand ==
- Civic Theatre, Auckland
- Civic Theatre (Invercargill)

== South Africa ==
- Joburg Theatre, previously Johannesburg Civic Theatre

== United Kingdom ==
- Bedford Civic Theatre, Bedfordshire
- Leeds City Museum, previously the Civic Theatre
- Oswaldtwistle Civic Theatre, Oswaldtwistle, Lancashire
- Rotherham Civic Theatre and Arts Centre, Rotherham, South Yorkshire

== United States ==
- San Diego Civic Theatre, California
- Civic Theatre (Fort Wayne), Indiana, which played Frankenstein – A New Musical and other shows
- Civic Theatre (New Orleans), Louisiana
- Farmington Civic Theatre, Michigan
- Akron Civic Theatre, Ohio
- Civic Theatre of Allentown, Pennsylvania
- Spokane Civic Theatre, Washington

== See also ==
- The Civic (disambiguation)
