= Civil (surname) =

Civil is a surname. Notable people with the surname include:

- Alan Civil (1929–1989), British horn player
- Danis Civil (born 1988), French breakdancer
- François Civil (born 1990), French actor
- Gabrielle Civil, American performance artist
- Karen Civil (born 1984), American social media and digital media marketing strategist
- Leandro Civil (1948–2025), Cuban middle-distance runner
- Marta Civil, American mathematics educator
- Miguel Civil (1926–2019), American Assyriologist
