= Civil =

Civil may refer to:

- Civility, orderly behavior and politeness
- Civic virtue, the cultivation of habits important for the success of a society
- Civil (journalism), a platform for independent journalism
- Civil (surname)
