= Farmington Community Library =

- 42.4980°N 83.3709°W
- Location: Farmington Hills, Michigan, United States
- Type: Public
- Established: 1913
- Branches: 2

Other information
- Director: Kelley Siegrist
- Employees: 96
- Website: www.farmlib.org

Farmington Community Library is a public library system serving the cities of Farmington and Farmington Hills in the U.S. state of Michigan. The main library is in Farmington Hills and one of the branches is in Farmington, Michigan.

== Locations ==
The Main Library is located at 32737 West 12 Mile Road. This is between Farmington and Orchard Lake Roads on the south side of 12 Mile, next to the Farmington Hills Post office. The Farmington Branch is located at 23500 Liberty Street, one block west of Farmington Road and one block south of Grand River. It is at the corner of Liberty and State Streets, next door to the Farmington City Hall.

== History ==
=== The early years ===
In March 1913, the Farmington Township board asked some women of the Ladies Literary Society to start a library. Members of the Ladies Literary Society were wives of leading Farmington business and professional men, these ladies would be the official group in charge of the library. The first library was housed in a classroom in the Baptist Church. The women rented the room for $12 a year, started with 800 books and $140 for the first year. The library operated with the money from the Library Association and the money the women were able to raise from fund-raising entertainment and lectures. There were also some funds coming for the Township Board. In 1919, when the war ended, Farmington added onto the Township Hall and a room for the library was created on the north side of the building. Soon the book collection grew to 4,500 volumes, and the need for increased library services and larger facilities became greater. Later, when the U.S. built the new post office in 1958, this same building became the downtown Farmington library. Before long, this building was too small for all the books and a proposal was passed to build a building in the north part of Farmington

=== The Main Library ===
The plans for construction of the Twelve Mile building were being designed, but the problem of money kept it at a standstill. Applications for federal funds were being rejected and construction cost was beginning to add up. In October, 1968, the plans for the library were suspended. It wasn’t until January 1970, that the decision to continue with the building of the library was decided. However, all the money was used to build the library and there wasn’t any money for books to fill the library. In addition, parts of the basement would go unfinished to bring the cost down. To raise money to add books and furnishings, a gift drive was held. The Farmington Jaycees and the Farmington Rotary Club were major contributors to the gift drive. The Farmington Jaycees decided to finish the children’s room and the Farmington Rotary Club donated money to help finish the Quiet Room. The Farmington Public Library was finished in June 1972. It opened to serve, particularly, the northern part of the community. With three floors, the Library was 38,000 square feet (3,500 m^{2}). The library included reference areas, fiction and non-fiction areas, a lounge, Quiet Room and Children’s Room which consumed the top floors. The lower floor had a meeting room and the Oakland County Sub Regional Library for the Blind and Physically Handicapped.

=== The Downtown Branch ===
The Twelve Mile branch was growing fast and contained over 22,000 books. It was time for the small library to gain another branch. It was decided to build the new branch in downtown Farmington, at the corner of State and Liberty Streets. It took time, but the land needed to build the new branch was obtained in February, 1974. Soon after, an agreement was made to give the libraries standardized names. The Public Library was called the Farmington Hills Branch and the District Library was called the Farmington Branch. In December, 1975, the Farmington branch was ready for business. The lower level became the Children’s Room and the upper level included the fiction and non-fiction areas, and it also contained a quiet room.

=== Growth ===
In January 2003, the Farmington Hills Library went through a renovation, and about 72,000 square feet (6,700 m^{2}) was added. A new computer lab and commons area was added and included new computers. Also, wireless internet was added and was now accessible at any study table. The entire lower lever of the building is taken up by the Children Department. The Children’s Department contains a Smart Start center. The center has fully interactive reading readiness activities.

== Governance ==
The Farmington Community Library is governed by a board of trustees. The library’s board is composed of eight members, each being nominated either by Farmington or Farmington Hills (four members each). Board meetings are held the second Thursday of each month at the main library in Farmington Hills and the meetings are open to the public. The board of trustees establishes, maintains and operates the libraries, can appoint or remove a librarian, and can supervise and control the library’s property.

Members
President: Ernie McClellan Jr.
Vice-President: Robert J. Hahn
Treasurer: Kathie Brown
Secretary: Jim White
Trustee: Renee Murphy
Trustee: Cris Doby
Trustee: Open (Farmington)
Trustee: Open (Farmington Hills)
Library Director: Kelley Siegrist
