= Farmington Civic Theatre =

Theatre in Farmington, Michigan, US

Farmington Civic Theater
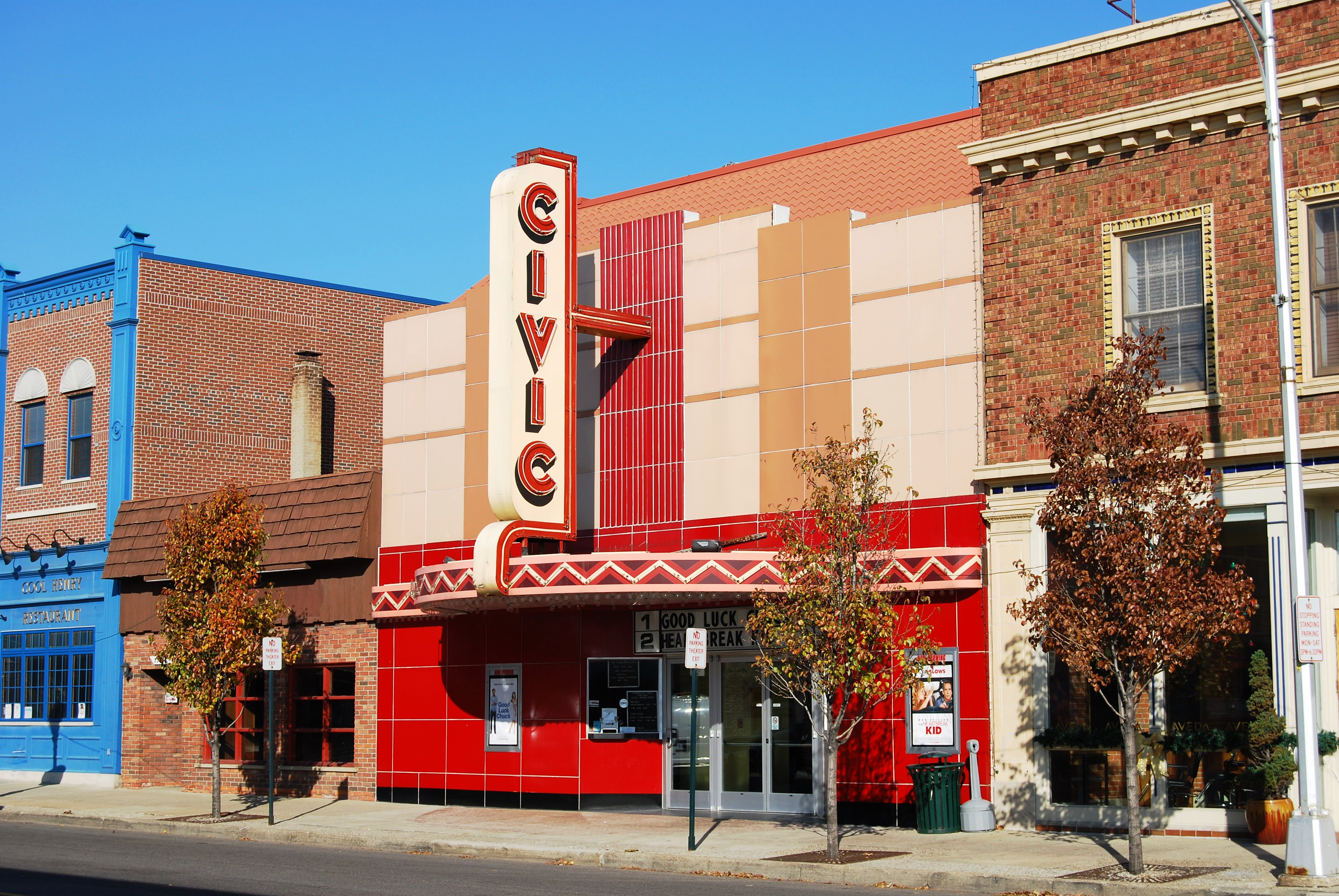
- Facade of the Farmington Civic Theater, taken in 2007
- Interactive map of Farmington Civic Theater
- Address: 33332 Grand River Avenue; Farmington, Michigan; United States
- Coordinates: 42.46487°N 83.37607°W
- Capacity: 410

Website
- www.thefct.com

The historic Farmington Civic Theater is located in downtown Farmington, Michigan. The theater opened in 1940 and is still in operation. The Civic is a historical site.

== History ==
The Farmington Civic Theater was constructed in 1939/1940 and officially opened September 20, 1940. The movie theater was built on the site of a vacant A&P Supermarket, which was torn down to make way for the new theater. The property was owned by Louis Rose (Louis Rose Builders-Detroit). He was also primarily responsible for the construction of the new building. The plans called for Associate Theatres Inc. to operate the movie business operations. The company operated a string of movie houses throughout Detroit and Michigan at the time. Edward Hohler became the Manager of the Civic Theatre and stayed on when the business was taken over by Community Theaters in 1943. Hohler, who died in 1989, purchased the business in 1951 and remained manager until his son Gregory took over in 1973. Greg Hohler purchased the theater building from the Louis Rose estate in 1989. He made a number of investments in the theater until its sale to the City of Farmington, Michigan in 1999. This included closing the theater for the first time in its history for a five-week remodeling. The balcony became the upstairs theater.

In 1999, the City of Farmington bought the Farmington Civic Theater from the Hohler family. The Hohler family had operated the theater since its 1940 opening. Right after purchasing the theater, the City renovated, adding new seating, a new roof and updated the lobby, concessions area, and restrooms.

== Now ==
The Farmington Civic Theater has a blade marquee and facade in shades of red and off-white. The main floor seats 273 while the upper theater seats 132. Seating in the upper theater is “stadium seating” style auditorium. Effective September 17, 2021, the theater changed its operations from showing intermediate and second-run movies to showing first-run movies.

The theater removed 35mm projectors and older technical equipment in July 2013 and converted to digital projection with Dolby Surround 7.1.

== Location ==
The Farmington Civic Theater is located at 33332 Grand River Avenue in Farmington, Michigan. It is just east of the Farmington Road and Grand River Avenue intersection in Downtown Farmington. Surrounding the Civic are over 150 stores, restaurants and shops. It is also located just 10 minutes away from 12 Oaks Mall in Novi, Michigan. The theater is less than 30 minutes from Detroit.
