= Marta Civil =

American mathematics educator

Marta Civil is an American mathematics educator. Her research involves understanding the cultural background of minority schoolchildren, particularly Hispanic and Latina/o students in the Southwestern United States, and using that understanding to promote parent engagement and focus mathematics teaching on students' individual strengths. She is the Roy F. Graesser Endowed Professor at the University of Arizona, where she holds appointments in the department of mathematics, the department of mathematics education, and the department of teaching, learning, and sociocultural studies.

== Education and career ==
Civil earned her Ph.D. at the University of Illinois at Urbana–Champaign in 1990. Her dissertation, Doing and Talking about Mathematics: A Study of Preservice Elementary Teachers, was supervised by Peter George Braunfeld. In 2011 she moved from the University of Arizona to the University of North Carolina, to become Frank A. Daniels Distinguished Professor of Mathematics Education, but returned to Arizona in 2014 to become the Graesser Professor.

== Books ==
Civil is co-editor of the books Transnational and Borderland Studies in Mathematics Education (Routledge, 2011), Latinos/as and Mathematics Education: Research on Learning and Teaching in Classrooms and Communities (Information Age, 2011), Cases for Mathematics Teacher Educators: Facilitating Conversations about Inequities in Mathematics Classrooms (Information Age, 2016), and Access & Equity: Promoting High-Quality Mathematics in Grades 3-5 (National Council of Teachers of Mathematics, 2018).

== Recognition ==
In 2013 TODOS: Mathematics for All gave Civil their Iris M. Carl Equity and Leadership Award. She is included in a deck of playing cards featuring notable women mathematicians published by the Association of Women in Mathematics. She received the 2021 National Council of Teachers of Mathematics (NCTM) Lifetime Achievement Award.
