= Farmington, Michigan =

- City
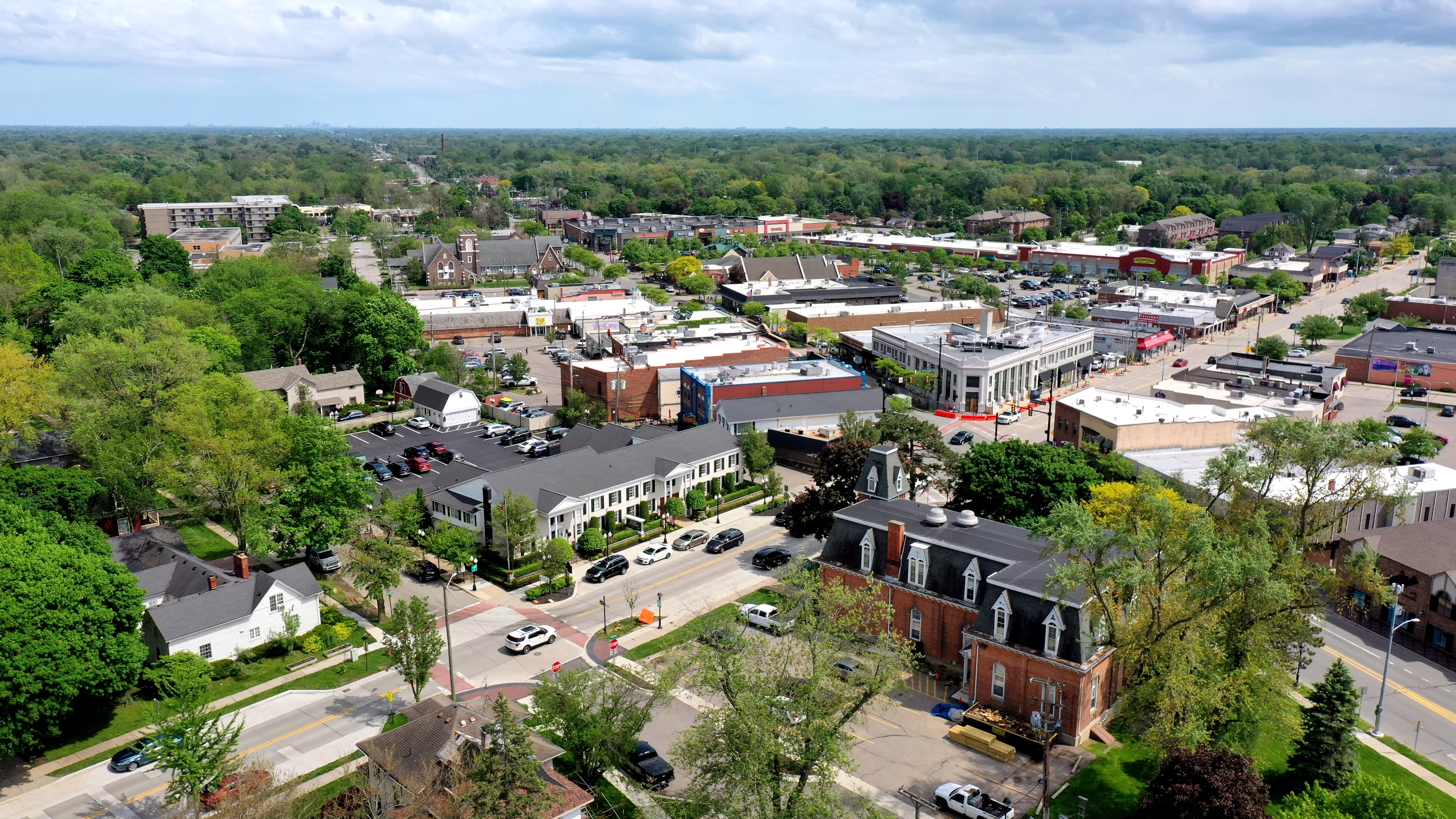
- Farmington Historic District
- Interactive map of Farmington, Michigan
- Location within the state of Michigan Location within the United States
- Coordinates: 42°27′52″N 83°22′35″W
- Country: United States
- State: Michigan
- County: Oakland
- Founded: 1824
- Incorporated: 1867 (village); 1926 (city)

Government
  - Type: Council–manager
  - Mayor: Joe LaRussa
  - Manager: David Murphy

Area
  - City: 2.66 sq mi (6.90 km^{2})
  - Land: 2.66 sq mi (6.90 km^{2})
  - Water: 0 sq mi (0.00 km^{2})
- Elevation: 751 ft (229 m)

Population (2020)
  - City: 11,597
  - Density: 4,354.6/sq mi (1,681.33/km^{2})
  - Metro: 4,296,250 (Metro Detroit)
- Time zone: UTC-5 (EST)
  - Summer (DST): UTC-4 (EDT)
- ZIP code(s): 48332, 48335, 48336
- Area code: 248
- FIPS code: 26-27380
- GNIS feature ID: 0625837
- Website: Official website

Farmington is a city in Oakland County in the U.S. state of Michigan. A northwestern suburb of Detroit, Farmington is located roughly 20 miles (32.2 km) from downtown Detroit and is surrounded on most sides by the larger city of Farmington Hills. As of the 2020 census, the city had a population of 11,594.

The area is known for its historic downtown and Victorian-style homes. Farmington and Farmington Hills are served by Farmington Public Schools and the Farmington Community Library.

== History ==
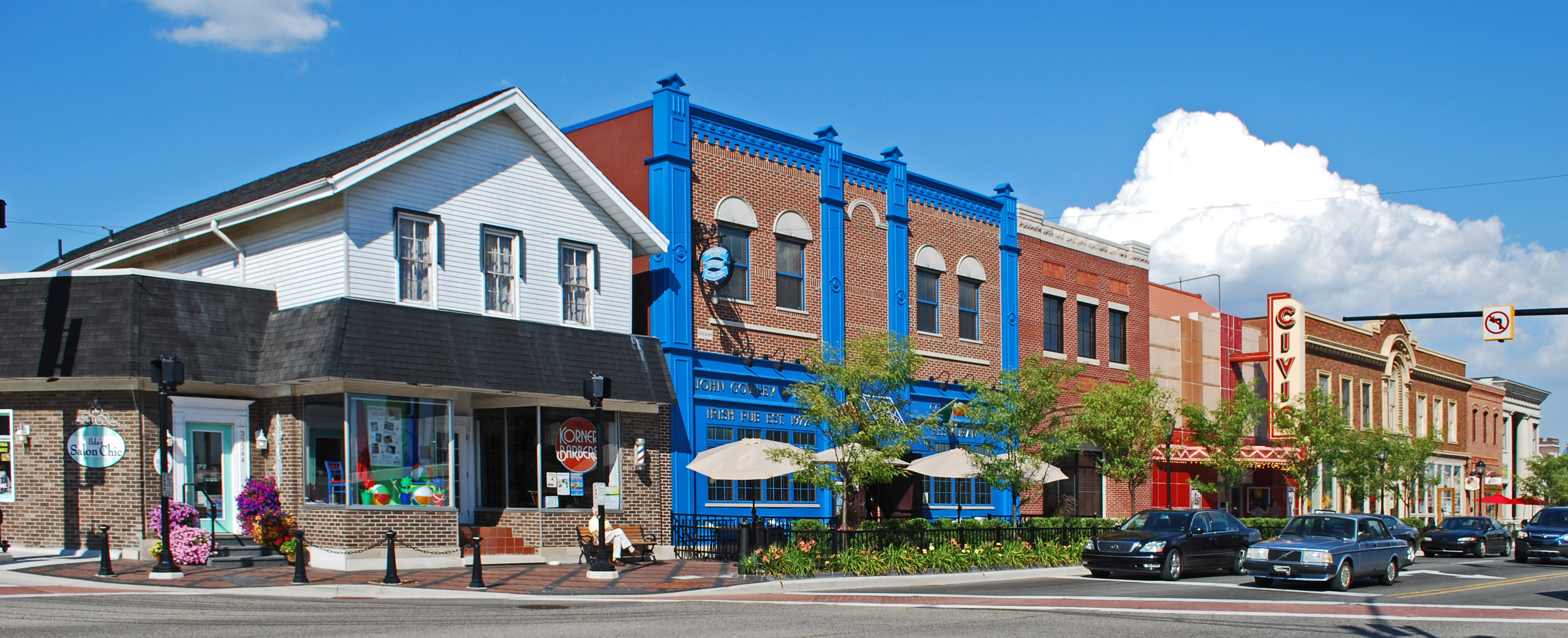
Farmington Historic District

Farmington was the site of three Native American trails - the Orchard Lake Trail, the Grand River Trail, and the Shiawassee Trail.

Farmington was founded in 1824 by Arthur Power. Like many Oakland County pioneers, he hailed from the state of New York. Power was a Quaker, as were the settlers who joined him, and the town was first known as Quakertown. In 1826 the name Farmington was officially chosen because it was the name of Power's hometown, Farmington, New York.

The name Farmington, which properly refers to the 2.7-square-mile (7.0 km^{2}) municipality incorporated in the early 19th century, is sometimes erroneously used to refer to the 33.3-square-mile (86 km^{2}) neighboring city of Farmington Hills (Farmington Township until 1973), which surrounds it.

In 1976 the National Register of Historic Places declared part of the city the Farmington Historic District.

Since 2009, the city's downtown has been the center of an extensive renovation and remodeling featuring a refacing or rebuilding of many buildings on Grand River Avenue, as well as brick paver sidewalks, the Farmington Pavilion, new lighting, and landscaping. In 2007 CNNMoney.com listed Farmington as number 55 in its Best Places to Live survey. Farmington was also ranked 27th on the list for Best to Live in 2013, citing nearly US$3 million in additional city renovations and development, bumping its rank up.

== Geography ==
According to the United States Census Bureau, the city has a total area of 2.66 square miles (6.89 km^{2}), all of it land.

=== Climate ===
Climate data for Farmington, Michigan (1991–2020)
| Month | Jan | Feb | Mar | Apr | May | Jun | Jul | Aug | Sep | Oct | Nov | Dec | Year |
|---|---|---|---|---|---|---|---|---|---|---|---|---|---|
| Mean daily maximum °F (°C) | 30.4 (−0.9) | 33.7 (0.9) | 43.6 (6.4) | 56.7 (13.7) | 68.5 (20.3) | 78.4 (25.8) | 82.9 (28.3) | 80.7 (27.1) | 73.5 (23.1) | 60.3 (15.7) | 46.7 (8.2) | 35.4 (1.9) | 57.6 (14.2) |
| Daily mean °F (°C) | 23.0 (−5.0) | 24.7 (−4.1) | 33.8 (1.0) | 45.4 (7.4) | 57.1 (13.9) | 67.2 (19.6) | 71.4 (21.9) | 69.8 (21.0) | 62.2 (16.8) | 50.1 (10.1) | 38.2 (3.4) | 28.6 (−1.9) | 47.6 (8.7) |
| Mean daily minimum °F (°C) | 15.6 (−9.1) | 15.7 (−9.1) | 24.0 (−4.4) | 34.1 (1.2) | 45.8 (7.7) | 56.0 (13.3) | 59.8 (15.4) | 58.9 (14.9) | 51.0 (10.6) | 39.9 (4.4) | 29.7 (−1.3) | 21.8 (−5.7) | 37.7 (3.2) |
| Average precipitation inches (mm) | 2.34 (59) | 1.75 (44) | 2.07 (53) | 3.05 (77) | 3.61 (92) | 3.31 (84) | 3.21 (82) | 3.17 (81) | 3.35 (85) | 2.65 (67) | 2.48 (63) | 2.03 (52) | 33.02 (839) |
| Average snowfall inches (cm) | 9.8 (25) | 10.6 (27) | 4.7 (12) | 1.5 (3.8) | 0.0 (0.0) | 0.0 (0.0) | 0.0 (0.0) | 0.0 (0.0) | 0.0 (0.0) | 0.0 (0.0) | 2.3 (5.8) | 7.1 (18) | 36 (91.6) |
Source: NOAA

== Demographics ==
Historical population
| Census | Pop. | Note | %± |
|---|---|---|---|
| 1880 | 377 | | — |
| 1890 | 320 | | −15.1% |
| 1900 | 530 | | 65.6% |
| 1910 | 564 | | 6.4% |
| 1920 | 853 | | 51.2% |
| 1930 | 1,243 | | 45.7% |
| 1940 | 1,510 | | 21.5% |
| 1950 | 2,325 | | 54.0% |
| 1960 | 6,881 | | 196.0% |
| 1970 | 10,329 | | 50.1% |
| 1980 | 11,022 | | 6.7% |
| 1990 | 10,132 | | −8.1% |
| 2000 | 10,423 | | 2.9% |
| 2010 | 10,372 | | −0.5% |
| 2020 | 11,597 | | 11.8% |
U.S. Decennial Census

=== 2020 census ===
As of the 2020 census, Farmington had a population of 11,597. The median age was 38.3 years. 18.8% of residents were under the age of 18 and 17.7% of residents were 65 years of age or older. For every 100 females there were 97.2 males, and for every 100 females age 18 and over there were 94.7 males age 18 and over.

100.0% of residents lived in urban areas, while 0.0% lived in rural areas.

There were 5,306 households in Farmington, of which 26.2% had children under the age of 18 living in them. Of all households, 45.8% were married-couple households, 21.2% were households with a male householder and no spouse or partner present, and 29.3% were households with a female householder and no spouse or partner present. About 36.4% of all households were made up of individuals and 14.6% had someone living alone who was 65 years of age or older.

There were 5,501 housing units, of which 3.5% were vacant. The homeowner vacancy rate was 1.1% and the rental vacancy rate was 4.3%.

Racial composition as of the 2020 census
| Race | Number | Percent |
|---|---|---|
| White | 7,004 | 60.4% |
| Black or African American | 1,122 | 9.7% |
| American Indian and Alaska Native | 35 | 0.3% |
| Asian | 2,696 | 23.2% |
| Native Hawaiian and Other Pacific Islander | 3 | 0.0% |
| Some other race | 114 | 1.0% |
| Two or more races | 623 | 5.4% |
| Hispanic or Latino (of any race) | 374 | 3.2% |

=== 2010 census ===
As of the census of 2010, there were 10,372 people, 4,624 households, and 2,735 families residing in the city. The population density was 3,899.2 inhabitants per square mile (1,505.5/km^{2}). There were 4,959 housing units at an average density of 1,869.6 per square mile (721.9/km^{2}). The racial makeup of the city was 71.5% White, 11.4% African American, 0.4% Native American, 13.9% Asian, 0.1% Pacific Islander, 0.4% from other races, and 2.1% from two or more races. Hispanic or Latino of any race were 2.1% of the population. There were 4,624 households, of which 28.0% had children under the age of 18 living with them, 45.9% were married couples living together, 10.4% had a female householder with no husband present, and 40.9% were non-families. 35.9% of all households were made up of individuals, and 13.7% had someone living alone who was 65 years of age or older. The average household size was 2.22 persons, and the average family size was 2.92.

In the city, the population was spread out, with 22.0% under the age of 18, 6.1% from 18 to 24, 29.4% from 25 to 44, 26.9% from 45 to 64, and 15.6% who were 65 years of age or older. The median age was 39.5 years. For every 100 females, there were 89.4 males. For every 100 females age 18 and over, there were 87.1 males.

The median income for a household in the city was $56,442, and the median income for a family was $67,407. Males had a median income of $54,780 versus $39,435 for females (2000 Census). The per capita income for the city was $36,281. About 2.6% of families and 4.4% of the population were below the poverty line, including 5.5% of those under age 18 and 7.6% of those age 65 or over.

== Government ==
Farmington utilizes the council-manager form of government. It is governed by a 5-member city council, whose members serve at-large. Council elections are held on a nonpartisan basis in odd-numbered years, in which the top two vote-getters are elected to council for four-year terms, and the third-place finisher is elected for a two-year term. Following elections, the council elects one of its members to serve as mayor, and another as mayor pro tempore, for a two-year term.

Current councilmembers
| Councilmember | Serving since | Term expires |
|---|---|---|
| Joe LaRussa (mayor 2023–2025) | 2017 | 2027 |
| Johnna Balk (mayor pro tempore 2023–2025) | 2021 | 2027 |
| Kevin Parkins | 2023 | 2025 |
| Steven Schneemann | 2015 | 2025 |
| Maria Taylor | 2017 | 2025 |

The city council appoints a city manager, who oversees the day-to-day operations of the city, as well as a city attorney, clerk, treasurer, and assessor. Other department officers are appointed by the city manager.

=== Federal, state, and county legislators ===
United States House of Representatives
| District | Representative | Party | Since |
|---|---|---|---|
| 11th | Haley Stevens | Democratic | 2019 |

Michigan Senate
| District | Senator | Party | Since |
|---|---|---|---|
| 6th | Mary Cavanagh | Democratic | 2023 |

Michigan House of Representatives
| District | Representative | Party | Since |
|---|---|---|---|
| 18th | Jason Hoskins | Democratic | 2023 |
| 21st | Kelly Breen | Democratic | 2023 |

Oakland County Board of Commissioners
| District | Commissioner | Party | Since |
|---|---|---|---|
| 16th | William Miller | Democratic | 2019 |

== Education ==
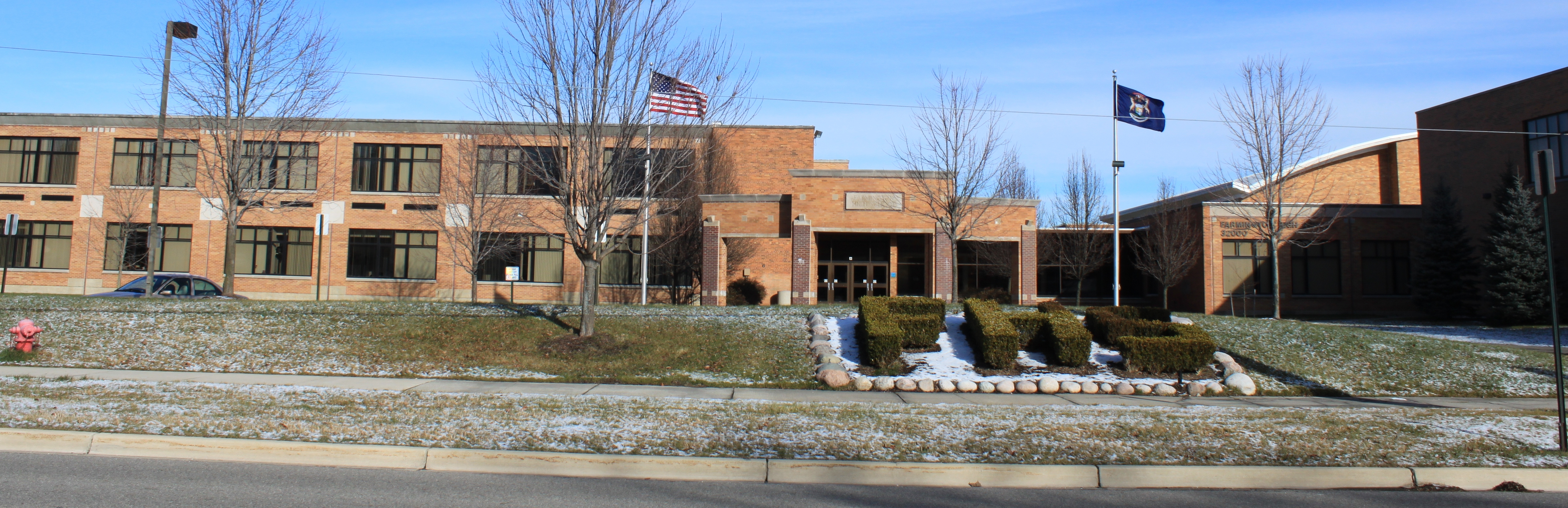
Farmington High School

Farmington is located in the Farmington Public Schools district. Farmington High School and Longacre Elementary School, as well as the district's administrative offices, are located within Farmington, while the rest of the district's schools are in neighboring Farmington Hills. Our Lady of Sorrows Catholic School, established in 1935, is also located in Farmington.

=== Library ===
Farmington is served by the Farmington Community Library, which has a branch in downtown Farmington alongside its main location in Farmington Hills.

== Notable sites ==
The former Farmington Winery building is located on Grand River Avenue just west of Orchard Lake Road and houses the "Haunted Winery" during the Halloween season.

== Media ==
In addition to The Detroit News and the Detroit Free Press, regional newspapers serving all of southeast Michigan, the city is served by two community newspapers. The Farmington Observer is published twice a week, on Sunday and Thursday. The Farmington Press is published weekly. The Oakland Press covers all of Oakland County.

== Recognition ==
In 2007, CNNMoney.com listed Farmington as number 55 in their Best Places to Live survey.

== Notable people ==
- Rex Cawley, gold medalist in the 1964 Tokyo Olympics
- Michael Fougere, mayor of Regina, Saskatchewan
- Devin Funchess, wide-receiver for the Carolina Panthers
- Mickey Harris, baseball pitcher
- Bob Johnson, ice hockey goaltender
- Brent Johnson, ice hockey player of the Pittsburgh Penguins
- Khalid Kareem, defensive end for Cincinnati Bengals
- Robert Patrick, Hollywood actor
- Martha Smith, actress, notably in Animal House as "Babs" and co-starring in Scarecrow and Mrs. King
- Drew Stanton, former NFL quarterback
- Mike Vellucci, head coach of Charlotte Checkers
- Garlin Gilchrist II, Lt. Governor of Michigan
- Megan Keller, professional women's hockey player, two-time Olympian, 2026 gold medalist

== See also ==
- Farmington Community Library
