= List of disc golf courses in Canada =

As of January 2020, there are 277 known disc golf courses in Canada on the official PDGA Course Directory. Below is a listing of disc golf courses in Canada by province and territory. In January 2021, the PDGA announced that the Baker Park Disc Golf Course (in Calgary, Alberta) was the most played course in Canada for 2020. This was determined by total U-Disc submitted rounds; the actual number of disc golfers throwing at Baker Park is thought to be upwards of ten times more than what was logged and reported.

Province or territory	Courses	as % of courses in Canada	per capita (/1M)	per 10,000 km^{2} of dry land
Alberta	48	17.3	10.9	0.7
British Columbia	74	26.7	15.9	0.8
Manitoba	17	6.1	13.3	0.3
New Brunswick	4	1.4	5.4	0.6
Nova Scotia	14	5.1	15.2	2.6
Nunavut	1	0.4	27.8	0
Ontario	72	26	5.4	0.8
Prince Edward Island	5	1.8	35	8.8
Quebec	24	8.7	2.9	0.2
Saskatchewan	17	6.1	15.5	0.1
Yukon	5	1.8	139.4	0
Canada (average)	277		7.3	0.3

== Alberta ==
According to the PDGA Website, as of July 2023, there are 70 known disc golf courses in Alberta on the official PDGA Course Directory. 35 of them (50%) are full-size courses with 18 holes or more. Alberta has 16 courses per million inhabitants, compared to the Canadian average of 6.9.

From U-disc- Ranked as the 3rd best disc golf province in Canada, Alberta has 137 courses. Among these are 52 courses which have 18 or more holes. Alberta is also home to 104 leagues and 30 stores that sell disc golf gear.

Disc golf courses in Alberta

List of disc golf courses in Alberta as of 2023
Course	Est.	City	State/Province	# Holes
22 Birdwalk		Sundre	Alberta	9
4 Wing Disc Golf Course		Cold Lake	Alberta	9
Alberta Badlands Disc Golf Course		Wayne	Alberta	18
Aperture Park - University of Lethbridge		Lethbridge	Alberta	18
Aspen Meadows - East		Sundre	Alberta	18
Aspen Meadows - West		Sundre	Alberta	18
Bailey's Crossing Disc Golf Course		Spruce Grove	Alberta	18
Baker Park		Calgary	Alberta	18
Barnwell Disc Golf Course		Barnwell	Alberta	6
Bonnyville Baptist Disc Golf Course	2022	Bonnyville	Alberta	9
Bud Miller Disc Golf		Lloydminster	Alberta	9
Canmore Nordic Centre		Canmore	Alberta	18
Central Park		Medicine Hat	Alberta	9
Co-op Community Disc Golf Course		Grande Prairie	Alberta	18
Cochrane Disc Golf Course		Cochrane	Alberta	9
Community Park		High Level	Alberta	9
Currie Reservoir		Calgary	Alberta	21
David Richardson Memorial Disc Golf Park		Calgary	Alberta	18
David Thompson Resort & Campground		Nordegg	Alberta	9
Drayton Valley Top Gun Course		Rocky Rapids	Alberta	18
Eagles Landing Disc Golf Course		Cherhill	Alberta	18
Eastview Middle School		Red Deer	Alberta	6
Edgemont Disc Golf Course		Calgary	Alberta	11
Elkwater Disc Golf Course		Elkwater	Alberta	9
Forest Lawn		Calgary	Alberta	9
Four Seasons Disc Golf Course		Beaumont	Alberta	9
Gillwell Park		Medicine Hat	Alberta	9
Granview Park Disc Golf		Granum	Alberta	9
Hermitage Park Disc Golf Course		Edmonton	Alberta	18
Hinton Disc Golf Course		Hinton	Alberta	18
Innisfail Kinsmen Disc Golf Park		innisfail	Alberta	9
Jubilee Park		Spruce Grove	Alberta	9
Kentwood Disc Golf Course		Red Deer	Alberta	9
Kitscoty Disc Golf Course		Kitscoty	Alberta	18
Lake Sundance		Calgary	Alberta	6
Lee Creek Campground Family Reunion Centre		Cardston	Alberta	9
Leinweber Park		Medicine Hat	Alberta	9
Lethbridge West Lions Club Disc Golf Course		Lethbridge	Alberta	18
Lions Rotary Disc Golf		Fort McMurray	Alberta	6
Lloyd Park		Calgary	Alberta	18
Middle Earth Disc Golf Course		Keephills	Alberta	18
Midland Provincial Park		Drumheller	Alberta	18
Midnapore Park		Calgary	Alberta	9
Nicholas Sheran Park		Lethbridge	Alberta	18
Norwester		Edmonton	Alberta	9
Oxbow Country Disc Golf		Strathmore	Alberta	18
Park 96		Calgary	Alberta	18
Pothole Creek Disc Golf Course		Magrath	Alberta	18
Red Tail Ridge		Calgary	Alberta	18
Redwood Meadows Disc Golf Course		Redwood Meadows	Alberta	11
Riverside Disc Golf Course		Okotoks	Alberta	9
Rocky Lane Fairways and Recreation		Athabasca	Alberta	18
Rotary Links Disc Golf Course		Fort McMurray	Alberta	9
Rundle Park Disc Golf Course		Edmonton	Alberta	18
South Bear Creek		Grande Prairie	Alberta	18
Stone Creek Disc Golf		Fort McMurray	Alberta	36
Stoney Creek Disc Golf Course	2021	Camrose	Alberta	9
Strathcona Wilderness Centre		Ardrossan	Alberta	9
Strathmore Disc Golf Course		Strathmore	Alberta	18
Sylvan Lake Disc Golf Course		Sylvan Lake	Alberta	18
The Hills Disc Golf Course		Edmonton	Alberta	9
Thorncliffe Disc Golf Course		Calgary	Alberta	9
Three Hills Disc Golf Course		Three Hills	Alberta	9
Three Sisters		Canmore	Alberta	12
Thrill Hill		Grand Prairie	Alberta	18
Victoria Park		Red Deer	Alberta	18
Walters Green (Hartman Green)		Olds	Alberta	9
Water-In-View at Fred Johns Park		Leduc	Alberta	9
Wetaskiwin Disc Golf Course	2005	Wetaskiwin	Alberta	18
Wildman Disc Golf		Bon Accord	Alberta	18
WJ Homestead Disc Golf Course		Foothills	Alberta	18

== British Columbia ==
As of January 2020, there are 73 known disc golf courses in British Columbia on the official PDGA Course Directory. 43 of them (58%) are full-size courses with 18 holes or more, and 30 of them (41%) are smaller courses that feature at least 9 holes. British Columbia has 14.5 courses per million inhabitants, compared to the Canadian average of 6.9.

List of disc golf courses in British Columbia as of January 2020 (Note: All disc golf courses listed below and their related information were pulled from the PDGA, UDisc, Disc Golf Course Review (DGCR), The Disc Golf Scene (TDGS), Infinite Courses, and local course directories unless referenced otherwise.)
Course	Location	Holes	Since
Black Creek Community Disc Golf Course	Black Creek	18	2005
Bowen Park Disc Golf Course	Nanaimo	18	1995
Cascade Par 3 Golf Course	Christina Lake	9	2018
Centennial Park Disc Golf Course	Mission	9	2014
Clearwater Disc Golf Course	Clearwater	18	2010
Coal Creek Disc Golf Course	Cumberland	18	2015
Coal Shoots	Courtenay	16	2011
Coopers Hawk Disc Golf Course	Campbell River	18	2002
Copper Ridge Disc Golf Course	Logan Lake	18	2007
Craig Park	Powell River	18	2018
Cranbrook Disc Golf Course	Cranbrook	18	2002
Dawson Creek Disc Golf Course	Dawson Creek	13	2014
Deerborne Disc Golf Course	Elkford	18	2014
Dick Hart Park	Kamloops	18	2009
Dinner Bay Disc Golf on Mayne Island	Mayne Island	18	2014
Disc Golf Golden	Golden	18	2018
Doumont	Nanaimo	18	2011
East Lillooet Disc Golf Course	Lillooet	18	2017
Eastview Park	North Vancouver	9	2009
Echo Woods	Port Alberni	9	2011
Fallow Ridge	Vernon	28	2000
Farmington - Battle of the Peace 4	Farmington	18	2018
Go Organic Sports Ranch	Parson	38	2004
Golf Island Disc Park at Pender	Pender Island	27	1980
Gouthro Park Disc Golf Course	Powell River	9	2018
Grouse Mountain	North Vancouver	18	2013
Hart Memorial Disc Golf Course (Mouat Park)	Salt Spring Island	18	1998
Hillside Greens Disc Golf Course	Dawson Creek	9	2017
Jericho Hill Community Centre	Vancouver	17	1998
Kicking Horse Mountain Resort	Golden	18	2018
Knox Mountain Disc Golf Course	Kelowna	9	2006
Lakers Disc Golf Course	Vernon	9	2015
Langley Passive Park	Langley	18	2004
Layritz Disc Golf Course	Saanich	9	2018
Linnaea Farm	Cortes Island	18	1997
Queen Elizabeth Park Disc Golf Course	Vancouver	18	1984
Lizard Range Disc Golf Course	Fernie	18	2004
Marsh Creek Disc Golf Course	Fruitvale	18	2016
McArthur Island Disc Golf Course	Kamloops	18	2019
Mt. Washington Fly Zone	Mount Washington	9	2005
Mundy Park	Coquitlam	9	1982
Naked Acres	Vernon	18	2019
One Mile Lake	Pemberton	9	2013
Parwood Disc Golf Course	Sparwood	18	2013
Pine Tree Meadow	Lytton	9	2004
Pouce Park Disc Golf Course	Pouce Coupe	9	2018
Pryde Vista Golf Course	Nanaimo	18	2019
Qualicum Bay Resort Disc Golf Course	Qualicum Bay	18	2008
Quilchena Disc Golf Course	Vancouver	12	2002
Rainbow Park Rotary Disc Golf Course	Prince George	9	2007
Ranger Park Disc Golf	Smithers	9	2006
Raptors Knoll Disc Golf Course	Langley	18	2019
Robert Burnaby Park Disc Golf Course	Burnaby	9	1999
Rockridge School	West Vancouver	6	2010
Rose Hill - West	Kamloops	18	2000
Salt Spring Golf and Country Club	Salt Spring Island	18	2018
Shirley Macey Park	Gibsons	9	2004
Squamish - Brackendale	Brackendale	18	2012
Sunset Park Disc Golf Course	Powell River	9	2017
Thin Air Disc Golf Course	Rossland	18	2007
Thomson Park	Saturna	9	2016
Thornhill Park Disc Golf Course	Maple Ridge	14	2006
Three Blind Mice	Penticton	18	2014
Toboggan Hill	Fort St. John	9	2016
VCUDGC 2017 Jericho Glow Layout	Vancouver	18	2017
Veterans Park, Bowen Island	Bowen Island	9	2019
Village Park Disc Golf Course	Comox	9	2007
Walden Park Disc Golf Course	Chilliwack	9	2017
Wells Gray Golf and RV	Clearwater	18	2017
Whistler Disc Golf Course	Whistler	27	2001
Whistler RV Park Disc Golf Course	Whistler	18	2018
Winskill Park	Tsawwassen	9	1978
Wycliffe Disc Golf Course	Cranbrook	18	2017
Ymir Whirl (Cloverbear) Disc Golf Course	Ymir	18	1998

Rotary Marina View Disc Golf Course, Penticton, 2016, 9

Whistling Kettle Disc Golf Course, Princeton, 2023, 18

== Ontario ==
As of April 2022, there are over 90 known disc golf courses in Ontario on the official PDGA Course Directory. Of these, 52 are full-size courses with 18 holes or more and 33 have fewer than 18 holes. Ontario has 5 courses per million inhabitants, compared to the Canadian average of 6.9.

List of disc golf courses in Ontario as of April 2022 (Note: All disc golf courses listed below and their related information were pulled from the PDGA, UDisc, Disc Golf Course Review (DGCR), The Disc Golf Scene (TDGS), Infinite Courses, and local course directories unless referenced otherwise.)
Course	Location	#	Since
Abbey Gardens Disc Golf Trail	Haliburton	18	2021
Algonquin Disc Golf at Tom Thompson Park	South River	18	2003
Andersons Homestead Golf and Disc Golf Course	Dryden	18	2016
Annandale Golf & Curling Club	Ajax	18	2011
Bayside Back Nine	Belleville	9	2011
Bayview Golf Course	Shuniah	18	2016
Beaches Disc Golf Course	Toronto	18	2018
Bexley Golf Centre	Kirkfield	9	2016
Birch Point Park	Thunder Bay	18	2010
Blue Springs Scout Reserve	Acton	9	2010
Bronte Creek Provincial Park	Oakville	18	1998
Cartwright Fields Disc Golf Course	Nestleton	18	2018
Cedarvale Park	Georgetown	9	2010
Centennial Gardens	St. Catharines	18	2015
Centennial Park	Toronto (Etobicoke)	18	1980
Chicopee Ski & Summer Resort	Kitchener	18	2009
Christie Lake Conservation Area	Dundas	18	2007
Coronation Park	Tillsonburg	18	2014
Dads of Muskoka Disc Golf at Verena Acres	Bracebridge	18	2014
Dellwood Park Disc Golf Course	Mississauga	6	2021
Dentonia Park Disc Golf Course	Toronto	9	2021
Dragon Hills Golf Course	Thunder Bay	18	2018
Dreamaker Campground	Southampton	18	2005
Durham Golf	Oshawa	18	2021
E. T. Seton Park	Toronto	18	2011
Eagle Lake Disc Golf Course	South River	18	2019
Ettyville Super Spin	Bourget	27	2006
Evergreen Fields	Huntsville	18	2008
Ferguson Forest Disc Golf Course	Kemptville	18	2021
Firemen's Park Disc Golf Course	Niagara Falls	18	2018
Flyboy Canada One	Brockville	16	2021
Flyboy Canada Two	Maitland	8	2022
Four Fathers Brewing Disc Golf Course	Cambridge	9	2021
Foxwood Disc Golf Course	Baden	18	2019
Gemmill Park	Almonte	9	2016
Green Lane Sports Complex	Paris	18	2015
Haliburton Disc Golf Course	Haliburton	9	2002
Hamilton Park	Peterborough	9	2015
Hanover Town Park Disc Golf	Hanover	9	2023
Hardwood Ski and Bike	Oro Station	18	2010
Homewood Park	Orillia	9	2006
Hunter's Creek Disc Golf Course	Cloyne	18	2021
Kanata Disc Golf Course	Kanata	9	2004
Kiwanis Club of Lakeshore Disc Golf Course	Sault Ste. Marie	12	2017
KOA Brighton Holiday	Brighton	9	2017
LaFortune Park Disc Golf Course	Caledonia	18	2018
Lake Whittaker Conservation Area	Thames Centre	18	2002
Lakewood Disc Golf Course	Tecumseh	18	2016
Lions Club of Sudbury	Sudbury	18	2009
Little Lake Disc Golf Course	Midland	18	2009
Loyalist College	Belleville	10	2006
Magnolia Disc Golf Course	Guelph	9	2007
Marilyn Bell Park Disc Golf Course	Toronto	9	2019
Marsh Pond Park	Stratford	9	2014
Miller Park	West Lorne	2	2002
Mohawk Disc Golf Course	Brantford	18	2006
Mountainview Disc Golf Course	Hilton Beach	18	2019
Newcastle Disc Golf	Newcastle	18	2021
Ontario Pioneer Camp - Boys Camp	Port Sydney	18	1989
Optimist Disc Golf Course	Lindsay	9	2018
Pittock Conservation Area	Woodstock	18	2001
Pointe Des Chenes Disc Golf Course	Sault Ste Marie	9	2021
Rideau Acres	Kingston	9	2005
River's Edge at St. Julien Park	London	27	2001
Riverain Park	Ottawa	18	2021
Riverside Park	Guelph	9	2018
Riverview Park	Peterborough	18	1997
Sandy Hollow Disc Golf Park	Barrie	20	2014
Scarlett Woods Disc Golf Course	Toronto	18	2020
Soper Park Disc Golf Course	Cambridge	9	2019
Spruce Park Disc Golf Course	Mississauga	4	2021
St. Dominic Catholic Secondary School	Bracebridge	7	2013
St. Urho's Disc Golf Course	Nolalu	9	2007
Steen Park	Aylmer	18	2010
Stone's Throw Disc Golf	Enterprise	19	2017
Sunny Valley Campground	Owen Sound	9	2004
T.N.T. Disc Golf Course	Tottenham	18	2015
Thames Grove Disc Golf Course	Chatham-Kent	9	2018
The Dunes/Port Burwell Provincial Park	Port Burwell	9	2000
Highlands Nordic	Duntroon	18	2019
Toronto Island Park Disc Golf Course	Toronto	18	1980
Toronto North Cookstown KOA	Cookstown	9	2008
University of Waterloo Course	Waterloo	9	2018
V.A. Barrie Park	St. Thomas	18	1983
Viamede Resort	Woodview	18	2014
Waterworks	St. Thomas	27	1999
Whiskey Run	Port Colborne	18	2013
White Spruce Park	Brampton	18	2003
Wild Country Disc Golf	Kawartha Lakes	18	2021
Winter Farms Disc Golf Course	Brantford	36	2021
Wolf Tracks @ Bondi	Dwight	18	2022

== Quebec ==
There are 24 known disc golf courses in Quebec. As of January 2020, 23 of them are listed on the official PDGA Course Directory. 11 of them (48%) are full-size courses with 18 holes or more, and 12 of them (52%) are smaller courses that feature at least 9 holes. Quebec has the lowest number of disc golf courses per capita of any province in Canada, with 2.7 courses per million inhabitants, compared to the Canadian average of 6.9.

Disc golf courses in southern Quebec

Course	Location	#	Since
Bois de Belle-Rivière	Mirabel	18	2012
Camp Fortune Disc Golf Course	Chelsea	18	2004
Camp Nominingue DGC	Nominingue	18	2017
Club de Golf Rivière-Hâtée	Le Bic	9	2007
College Mont-Sacre-Coeur	Granby	15	2016
CPDGQ Course*	Saint-Jean-Baptiste	18	2013
Disc Golf Tadoussac	Tadoussac	9	2019
Domaine de Rouville	Saint-Jean-Baptiste	18	2013
InterGolf DGC	Granby	9	2011
La Base Ste-Foy	Quebec City	18	
La Seigneurie	Pabos	19	
Mont Élan	Westbury	18	
Mont-Sainte-Anne	Beaupre	12	
Mt. Ham Sud Disc Golf	Ham-Sud	9	
Parc Christophe-Colomb	Saint-Jean-sur-Richelieu	9	
Parc de la Rivière DGC	Terrebonne	9	
Parc de la Rivière-aux-Pins DGC	Boucherville	9	2013
Parcours Ignace-Bourget	Montreal	12	2009
Parcours des Voltigeurs	Drummondville	18	2015
Parcours de la Frontière	Saint-Bernard-de-Lacolle	18	2014
Parcours Île Charron	Longueuil	18	2012
Parcours Les Rivières	Trois-Rivières	9	
Parcours Parc du Rigolet Lévis	Lévis	9	
Windsor Park	Dorval	3	2017
Yodaco	Mirabel	18	2014

== See also ==
List of disc golf courses in the United States

Ken Westerfield disc sports history in Canada
