= Farmington =

Farmington may refer to:

== Places ==
=== Canada ===
- Farmington, British Columbia
- Farmington, Nova Scotia (disambiguation)

=== United States ===
- Farmington, Arkansas
- Farmington, California
- Farmington, Connecticut
- Farmington, Delaware
- Farmington, Georgia
- Farmington, Kentucky
- Farmington (Louisville, Kentucky), listed on the National Register of Historic Places in Jefferson County, Kentucky
- Hustonville, Kentucky, formerly known as Farmington
- Kingsley, Kentucky, formerly known as Farmington
- Farmington, Illinois
- Farmington, Iowa
- Farmington, Maine, a New England town
  - Farmington (CDP), Maine, the main village in the town
- Farmington, Michigan
- Farmington, Minnesota
- Farmington, Mississippi
- Farmington, Missouri
- Farmington, New Hampshire, a New England town
  - Farmington (CDP), New Hampshire, the main village in the town
- Farmington, New Mexico
- Farmington, New York
- Farmington, North Carolina, a township and unincorporated community in Davie County, North Carolina
- Farmington, Ohio
- Farmington, Oregon
- Farmington, Pennsylvania (Fayette County)
- Farmington Township, Pennsylvania (disambiguation)
  - Farmington Township, Clarion County, Pennsylvania
  - Farmington Township, Tioga County, Pennsylvania
  - Farmington Township, Warren County, Pennsylvania
- Farmington, Tennessee
- Farmington, Utah
  - Farmington (UTA station), Utah Transit Authority commuter rail station
- Farmington, Virginia
- Farmington (Hampton, Virginia), a neighborhood
- Farmington (Albemarle County, Virginia), listed on the National Register of Historic Places in Albemarle County, Virginia
- Farmington (St. Stephens Church, Virginia), listed on the National Register of Historic Places in King and Queen County, Virginia
- Farmington, Washington
- Farmington, West Virginia
- Farmington, Wisconsin (disambiguation)
  - Farmington, Jefferson County, Wisconsin, a town
  - Farmington, La Crosse County, Wisconsin, a town
  - Farmington, Polk County, Wisconsin, a town
  - Farmington, Washington County, Wisconsin, a town
  - Farmington, Waupaca County, Wisconsin, a town
  - Farmington (community), Wisconsin, an unincorporated community
- Farmington Canal, also known as the New Haven and Northampton Canal, was a major private canal built in the early 19th century to provide water transportation from New Haven into the interior of Connecticut, Massachusetts and beyond
- Farmington River, a river in Hartford County, Connecticut

=== Elsewhere ===
- Farmington, Gloucestershire
- Farmington River (Liberia), a river in Liberia

== Other uses ==
- Farmington, nicknamed "The Farm", a fictional Los Angeles Police Department district in The Shield
- Farmington Institute for Christian Studies, at Oxford, UK
- University of Farmington, American fake university

== See also ==
- Battle of Farmington (disambiguation)
- Farmington High School (disambiguation)
- Farmington Public Schools (disambiguation)
- Farmington Historic District (disambiguation)
