= List of disc golf courses in Quebec =

There are 24 known disc golf courses in Quebec. As of January 2020, 23 of them are listed on the official PDGA Course Directory. 11 of them (48%) are full-size courses with 18 holes or more, and 12 of them (52%) are smaller courses that feature at least 9 holes. Quebec has the lowest number of disc golf courses per capita of any province in Canada, with 2.7 courses per million inhabitants, compared to the Canadian average of 6.9.

Disc golf courses in southern Quebec

List of disc golf courses in Quebec as of January 2020 (Note: All disc golf courses listed below and their related information were pulled from the PDGA, UDisc, Disc Golf Course Review (DGCR), The Disc Golf Scene (TDGS), Infinite Courses, and local course directories unless referenced otherwise.)
| Course | Location | # | Since |
|---|---|---|---|
| Bois de Belle-Rivière | Mirabel | 18 | 2012 |
| Camp Fortune Disc Golf Course | Chelsea | 18 | 2004 |
| Camp Nominingue DGC | Nominingue | 18 | 2017 |
| Club de Golf Rivière-Hâtée | Le Bic | 9 | 2007 |
| College Mont-Sacre-Coeur | Granby | 15 | 2016 |
| CPDGQ Course* | Saint-Jean-Baptiste | 18 | 2013 |
| Disc Golf Tadoussac | Tadoussac | 9 | 2019 |
| Domaine de Rouville | Saint-Jean-Baptiste | 18 | 2013 |
| InterGolf DGC | Granby | 9 | 2011 |
| La Base Ste-Foy | Quebec City | 18 | |
| La Seigneurie | Pabos | 19 | |
| Mont Élan | Westbury | 18 | |
| Mont-Sainte-Anne | Beaupre | 12 | |
| Mt. Ham Sud Disc Golf | Ham-Sud | 9 | |
| Parc Christophe-Colomb | Saint-Jean-sur-Richelieu | 9 | |
| Parc de la Rivière DGC | Terrebonne | 9 | |
| Parc de la Rivière-aux-Pins DGC | Boucherville | 9 | 2013 |
| Parcours Ignace-Bourget | Montreal | 12 | 2009 |
| Parcours des Voltigeurs | Drummondville | 18 | 2015 |
| Parcours de la Frontière | Saint-Bernard-de-Lacolle | 18 | 2014 |
| Parcours Île Charron | Longueuil | 18 | 2012 |
| Parcours Les Rivières | Trois-Rivières | 9 | |
| Parcours Parc du Rigolet Lévis | Lévis | 9 | |
| Windsor Park | Dorval | 3 | 2017 |
| Yodaco | Mirabel | 18 | 2014 |

== See also ==
List of disc golf courses in Canada
