= List of disc golf courses in British Columbia =

As of January 2020, there are 73 known disc golf courses in British Columbia on the official PDGA Course Directory. 43 of them (58%) are full-size courses with 18 holes or more, and 30 of them (41%) are smaller courses that feature at least 9 holes. British Columbia has 14.5 courses per million inhabitants, compared to the Canadian average of 6.9.

List of disc golf courses in British Columbia as of January 2020 (Note: All disc golf courses listed below and their related information were pulled from the PDGA, UDisc, Disc Golf Course Review (DGCR), The Disc Golf Scene (TDGS), Infinite Courses, and local course directories unless referenced otherwise.)
| Course | Location | Holes | Since |
|---|---|---|---|
| Black Creek Community Disc Golf Course | Black Creek | 18 | 2005 |
| Bowen Park Disc Golf Course | Nanaimo | 18 | 1995 |
| Cascade Par 3 Golf Course | Christina Lake | 9 | 2018 |
| Centennial Park Disc Golf Course | Mission | 9 | 2014 |
| Clearwater Disc Golf Course | Clearwater | 18 | 2010 |
| Coal Creek Disc Golf Course | Cumberland | 18 | 2015 |
| Coal Shoots | Courtenay | 16 | 2011 |
| Coopers Hawk Disc Golf Course | Campbell River | 18 | 2002 |
| Copper Ridge Disc Golf Course | Logan Lake | 18 | 2007 |
| Craig Park | Powell River | 18 | 2018 |
| Cranbrook Disc Golf Course | Cranbrook | 18 | 2002 |
| Dawson Creek Disc Golf Course | Dawson Creek | 13 | 2014 |
| Deerborne Disc Golf Course | Elkford | 18 | 2014 |
| Dick Hart Park | Kamloops | 18 | 2009 |
| Dinner Bay Disc Golf on Mayne Island | Mayne Island | 18 | 2014 |
| Disc Golf Golden | Golden | 18 | 2018 |
| Doumont | Nanaimo | 18 | 2011 |
| East Lillooet Disc Golf Course | Lillooet | 18 | 2017 |
| Eastview Park | North Vancouver | 9 | 2009 |
| Echo Woods | Port Alberni | 9 | 2011 |
| Fallow Ridge | Vernon | 28 | 2000 |
| Farmington - Battle of the Peace 4 | Farmington | 18 | 2018 |
| Go Organic Sports Ranch | Parson | 38 | 2004 |
| Golf Island Disc Park at Pender | Pender Island | 27 | 1980 |
| Gouthro Park Disc Golf Course | Powell River | 9 | 2018 |
| Grouse Mountain | North Vancouver | 18 | 2013 |
| Hart Memorial Disc Golf Course (Mouat Park) | Salt Spring Island | 18 | 1998 |
| Hillside Greens Disc Golf Course | Dawson Creek | 9 | 2017 |
| Jericho Hill Community Centre | Vancouver | 17 | 1998 |
| Kicking Horse Mountain Resort | Golden | 18 | 2018 |
| Knox Mountain Disc Golf Course | Kelowna | 9 | 2006 |
| Lakers Disc Golf Course | Vernon | 9 | 2015 |
| Langley Passive Park | Langley | 18 | 2004 |
| Layritz Disc Golf Course | Saanich | 9 | 2018 |
| Linnaea Farm | Cortes Island | 18 | 1997 |
| Queen Elizabeth Park Disc Golf Course | Vancouver | 18 | 1984 |
| Lizard Range Disc Golf Course | Fernie | 18 | 2004 |
| Marsh Creek Disc Golf Course | Fruitvale | 18 | 2016 |
| McArthur Island Disc Golf Course | Kamloops | 18 | 2019 |
| Mt. Washington Fly Zone | Mount Washington | 9 | 2005 |
| Mundy Park | Coquitlam | 9 | 1982 |
| Naked Acres | Vernon | 18 | 2019 |
| One Mile Lake | Pemberton | 9 | 2013 |
| Parwood Disc Golf Course | Sparwood | 18 | 2013 |
| Pine Tree Meadow | Lytton | 9 | 2004 |
| Pouce Park Disc Golf Course | Pouce Coupe | 9 | 2018 |
| Pryde Vista Golf Course | Nanaimo | 18 | 2019 |
| Qualicum Bay Resort Disc Golf Course | Qualicum Bay | 18 | 2008 |
| Quilchena Disc Golf Course | Vancouver | 12 | 2002 |
| Rainbow Park Rotary Disc Golf Course | Prince George | 9 | 2007 |
| Ranger Park Disc Golf | Smithers | 9 | 2006 |
| Raptors Knoll Disc Golf Course | Langley | 18 | 2019 |
| Robert Burnaby Park Disc Golf Course | Burnaby | 9 | 1999 |
| Rockridge School | West Vancouver | 6 | 2010 |
| Rose Hill - West | Kamloops | 18 | 2000 |
| Salt Spring Golf and Country Club | Salt Spring Island | 18 | 2018 |
| Shirley Macey Park | Gibsons | 9 | 2004 |
| Squamish - Brackendale | Brackendale | 18 | 2012 |
| Sunset Park Disc Golf Course | Powell River | 9 | 2017 |
| Thin Air Disc Golf Course | Rossland | 18 | 2007 |
| Thomson Park | Saturna | 9 | 2016 |
| Thornhill Park Disc Golf Course | Maple Ridge | 14 | 2006 |
| Three Blind Mice | Penticton | 18 | 2014 |
| Toboggan Hill | Fort St. John | 9 | 2016 |
| VCUDGC 2017 Jericho Glow Layout | Vancouver | 18 | 2017 |
| Veterans Park, Bowen Island | Bowen Island | 9 | 2019 |
| Village Park Disc Golf Course | Comox | 9 | 2007 |
| Walden Park Disc Golf Course | Chilliwack | 9 | 2017 |
| Wells Gray Golf and RV | Clearwater | 18 | 2017 |
| Whistler Disc Golf Course | Whistler | 27 | 2001 |
| Whistler RV Park Disc Golf Course | Whistler | 18 | 2018 |
| Winskill Park | Tsawwassen | 9 | 1978 |
| Wycliffe Disc Golf Course | Cranbrook | 18 | 2017 |
| Ymir Whirl (Cloverbear) Disc Golf Course | Ymir | 18 | 1998 |

== See also ==
List of disc golf courses in Canada
