= List of disc golf courses in Ontario =

As of April 2022, there are over 90 known disc golf courses in Ontario on the official PDGA Course Directory. Of these, 52 are full-size courses with 18 holes or more and 33 have fewer than 18 holes. Ontario has 5 courses per million inhabitants, compared to the Canadian average of 6.9.

List of disc golf courses in Ontario as of April 2022 (Note: All disc golf courses listed below and their related information were pulled from the PDGA, UDisc, Disc Golf Course Review (DGCR), The Disc Golf Scene (TDGS), Infinite Courses, and local course directories unless referenced otherwise.)
Course	Location	#	Since
Abbey Gardens Disc Golf Trail	Haliburton	18	2021
Algonquin Disc Golf at Tom Thompson Park	South River	18	2003
Andersons Homestead Golf and Disc Golf Course	Dryden	18	2016
Annandale Golf & Curling Club	Ajax	18	2011
Bayside Back Nine	Belleville	9	2011
Bayview Golf Course	Shuniah	18	2016
Beaches Disc Golf Course	Toronto	18	2018
Bexley Golf Centre	Kirkfield	9	2016
Birch Point Park	Thunder Bay	18	2010
Blue Springs Scout Reserve	Acton	9	2010
Bronte Creek Provincial Park	Oakville	18	1998
Cartwright Fields Disc Golf Course	Nestleton	18	2018
Cedarvale Park	Georgetown	9	2010
Centennial Gardens	St. Catharines	18	2015
Centennial Park	Toronto (Etobicoke)	18	1980
Chicopee Ski & Summer Resort	Kitchener	18	2009
Christie Lake Conservation Area	Dundas	18	2007
Coronation Park	Tillsonburg	18	2014
Dads of Muskoka Disc Golf at Verena Acres	Bracebridge	18	2014
Dellwood Park Disc Golf Course	Mississauga	6	2021
Dentonia Park Disc Golf Course	Toronto	9	2021
Dragon Hills Golf Course	Thunder Bay	18	2018
Dreamaker Campground	Southampton	18	2005
Durham Golf	Oshawa	18	2021
E. T. Seton Park	Toronto	18	2011
Eagle Lake Disc Golf Course	South River	18	2019
Ettyville Super Spin	Bourget	27	2006
Evergreen Fields	Huntsville	18	2008
Ferguson Forest Disc Golf Course	Kemptville	18	2021
Firemen's Park Disc Golf Course	Niagara Falls	18	2018
Flyboy Canada One	Brockville	16	2021
Flyboy Canada Two	Maitland	8	2022
Four Fathers Brewing Disc Golf Course	Cambridge	9	2021
Foxwood Disc Golf Course	Baden	18	2019
Gemmill Park	Almonte	9	2016
Green Lane Sports Complex	Paris	18	2015
Haliburton Disc Golf Course	Haliburton	9	2002
Hamilton Park	Peterborough	9	2015
Hanover Town Park Disc Golf	Hanover	9	2023
Hardwood Ski and Bike	Oro Station	18	2010
Homewood Park	Orillia	9	2006
Hunter's Creek Disc Golf Course	Cloyne	18	2021
Kanata Disc Golf Course	Kanata	9	2004
Kiwanis Club of Lakeshore Disc Golf Course	Sault Ste. Marie	12	2017
KOA Brighton Holiday	Brighton	9	2017
LaFortune Park Disc Golf Course	Caledonia	18	2018
Lake Whittaker Conservation Area	Thames Centre	18	2002
Lakewood Disc Golf Course	Tecumseh	18	2016
Lions Club of Sudbury	Sudbury	18	2009
Little Lake Disc Golf Course	Midland	18	2009
Loyalist College	Belleville	10	2006
Magnolia Disc Golf Course	Guelph	9	2007
Marilyn Bell Park Disc Golf Course	Toronto	9	2019
Marsh Pond Park	Stratford	9	2014
Miller Park	West Lorne	2	2002
Mohawk Disc Golf Course	Brantford	18	2006
Mountainview Disc Golf Course	Hilton Beach	18	2019
Newcastle Disc Golf	Newcastle	18	2021
Ontario Pioneer Camp - Boys Camp	Port Sydney	18	1989
Optimist Disc Golf Course	Lindsay	9	2018
Pittock Conservation Area	Woodstock	18	2001
Pointe Des Chenes Disc Golf Course	Sault Ste Marie	9	2021
Rideau Acres	Kingston	9	2005
River's Edge at St. Julien Park	London	27	2001
Riverain Park	Ottawa	18	2021
Riverside Park	Guelph	9	2018
Riverview Park	Peterborough	18	1997
Sandy Hollow Disc Golf Park	Barrie	20	2014
Scarlett Woods Disc Golf Course	Toronto	18	2020
Soper Park Disc Golf Course	Cambridge	9	2019
Spruce Park Disc Golf Course	Mississauga	4	2021
St. Dominic Catholic Secondary School	Bracebridge	7	2013
St. Urho's Disc Golf Course	Nolalu	9	2007
Steen Park	Aylmer	18	2010
Stone's Throw Disc Golf	Enterprise	19	2017
Sunny Valley Campground	Owen Sound	9	2004
T.N.T. Disc Golf Course	Tottenham	18	2015
Thames Grove Disc Golf Course	Chatham-Kent	9	2018
The Dunes/Port Burwell Provincial Park	Port Burwell	9	2000
Highlands Nordic	Duntroon	18	2019
Toronto Island Park Disc Golf Course	Toronto	18	1980
Toronto North Cookstown KOA	Cookstown	9	2008
University of Waterloo Course	Waterloo	9	2018
V.A. Barrie Park	St. Thomas	18	1983
Viamede Resort	Woodview	18	2014
Waterworks	St. Thomas	27	1999
Whiskey Run	Port Colborne	18	2013
White Spruce Park	Brampton	18	2003
Wild Country Disc Golf	Kawartha Lakes	18	2021
Winter Farms Disc Golf Course	Brantford	36	2021
Wolf Tracks @ Bondi	Dwight	18	2022

== See also ==
List of disc golf courses in Canada
