= Farmington, Wisconsin =

Farmington is the name of some places in the U.S. state of Wisconsin:

- Farmington, Jefferson County, Wisconsin, a town
- Farmington, La Crosse County, Wisconsin, a town
- Farmington, Polk County, Wisconsin, a town
- East Farmington, Wisconsin, unincorporated community located in the town of Farmington, Polk County
- Farmington, Washington County, Wisconsin, a town
- Farmington, Waupaca County, Wisconsin, a town
- Farmington (community), Wisconsin, an unincorporated community

== See also ==
- Farmington (disambiguation)
