= Farmington Historic District =

Farmington Historic District may refer to:

(by state, then city/town)

- Farmington Historic District (Farmington, Connecticut), listed on the National Register of Historic Places (NRHP) in Hartford County
- Farmington Historic District (Farmington, Maine), NRHP-listed in Franklin County
- Farmington Historic District (Farmington, Michigan), NRHP-listed in Oakland County
- Farmington Historic District (Farmington, North Carolina), NRHP-listed in Davie County
- Farmington Main Street Historic District, Farmington, Utah, NRHP-listed in Davis County

== See also ==
- Farmington (disambiguation)
