= Farmington metropolitan area =

The Farmington metropolitan area may refer to:

- The Farmington, New Mexico metropolitan area, United States
- The Farmington, Missouri micropolitan area, United States

== See also ==
- Farmington (disambiguation)
