= Rouville =

Rouville may refer to the following places:

- Rouville, Oise, a commune in the Oise department, France
- Rouville, Seine-Maritime, a commune in the Seine-Maritime department, France
- Rouville Regional County Municipality, Quebec, an administrative unit in Quebec, Canada
- Domaine de Rouville DGC, a disc golf course in Saint-Jean-Baptiste, Quebec, Canada
