= Queen Elizabeth Park, British Columbia =

City park in Vancouver, British Columbia, Canada

Queen Elizabeth Park
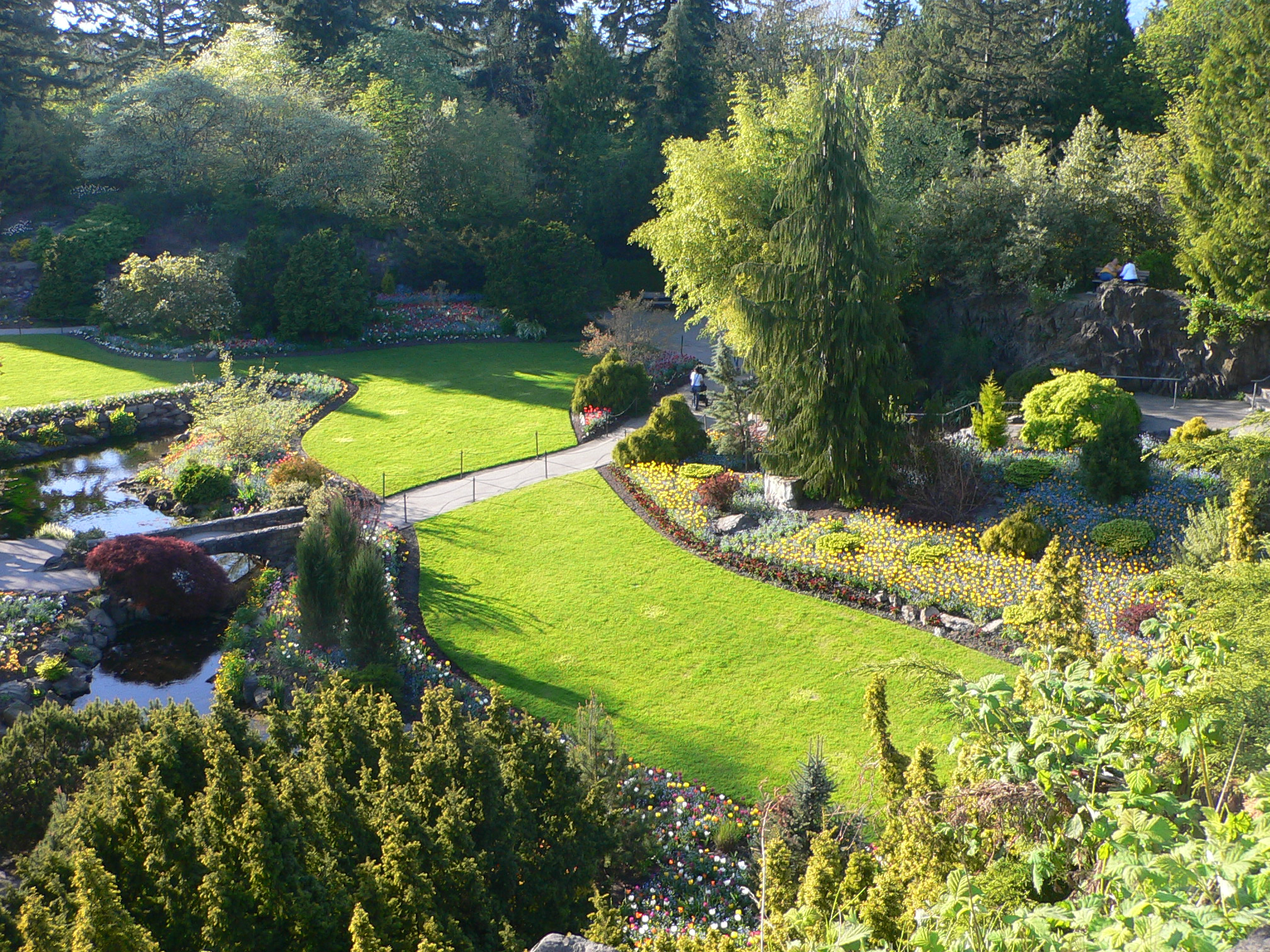
- A view of the park
- Interactive map of Queen Elizabeth Park
- Type: Public Park
- Location: Vancouver, British Columbia, Canada
- Coordinates: 49°14′32″N 123°06′54″W
- Area: 52 hectares (130 acres)
- Created: 1939
- Operator: City of Vancouver
- Website: vancouver.ca/parks-recreation-culture/queen-elizabeth-park.aspx

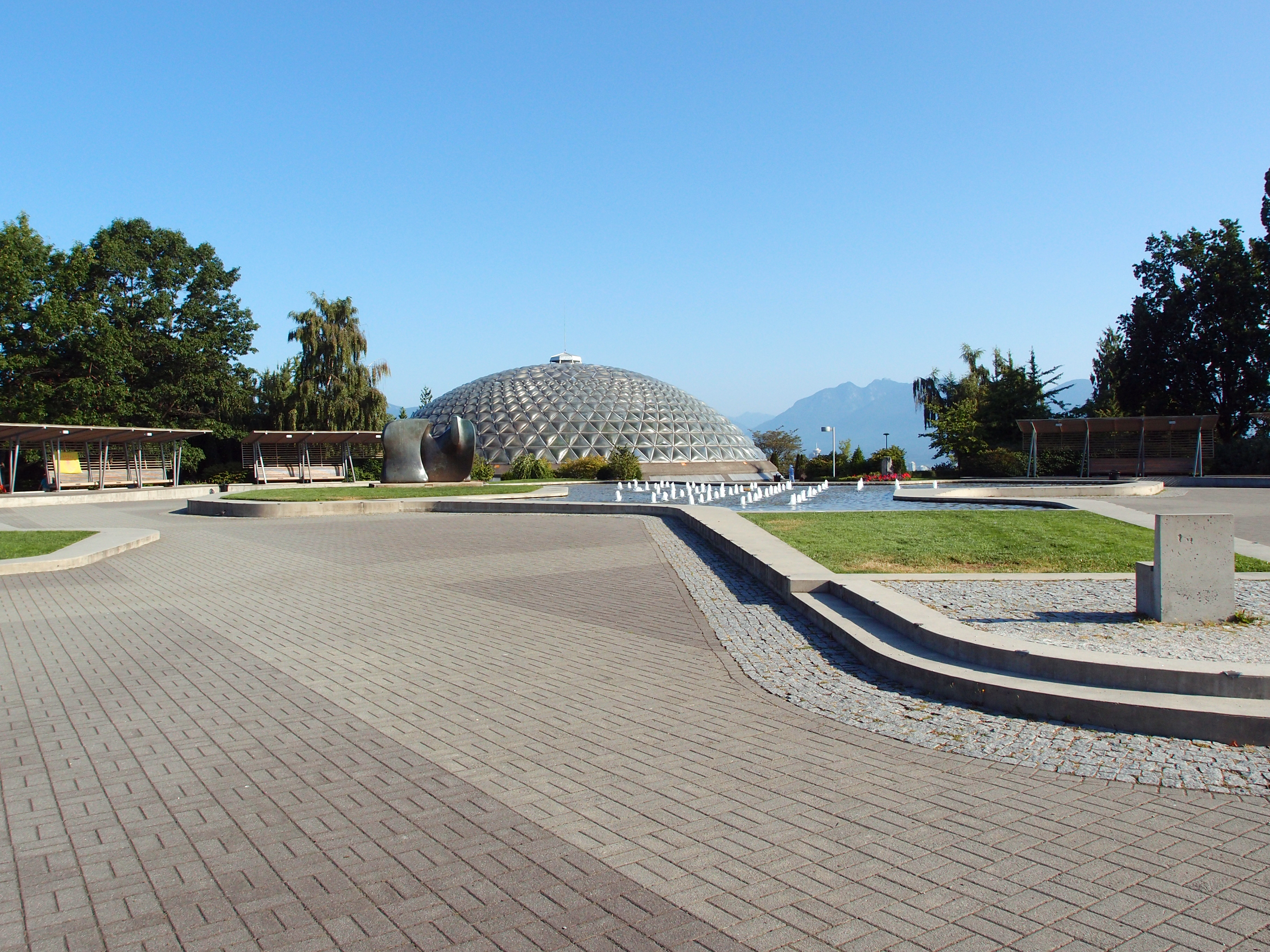
Bloedel Floral Conservatory Plaza

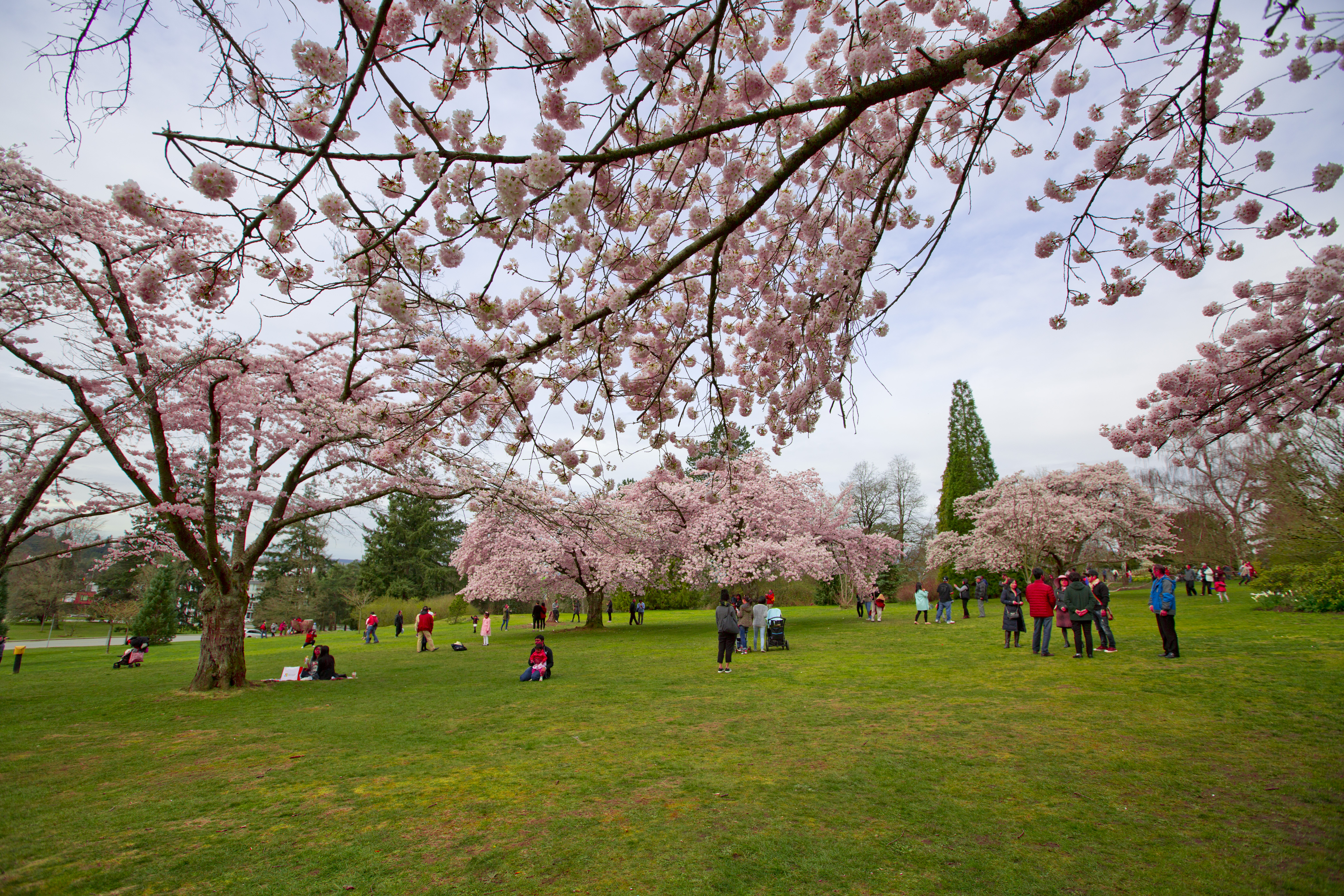
Cherry Blossoms in spring

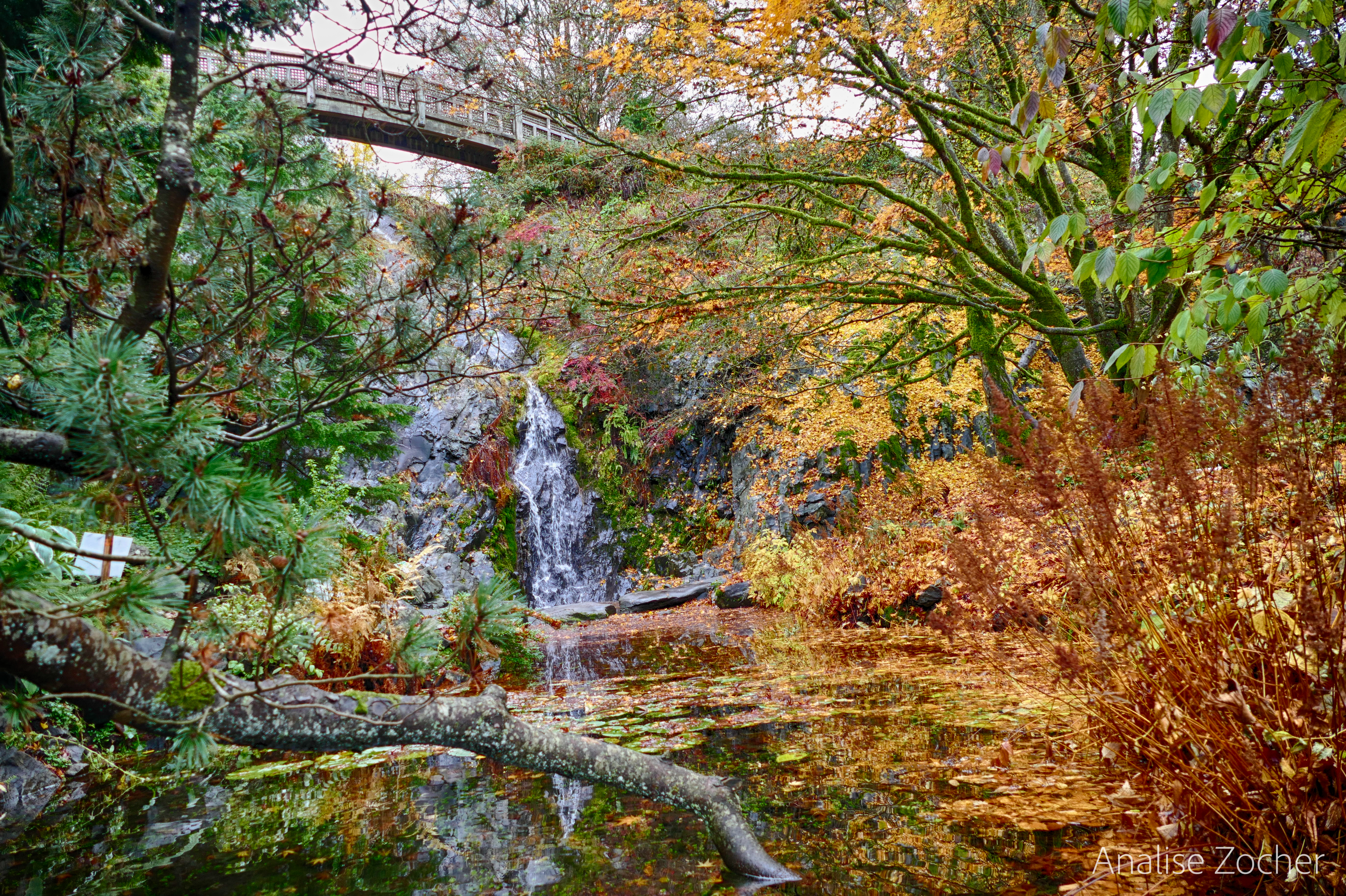
Park in autumn

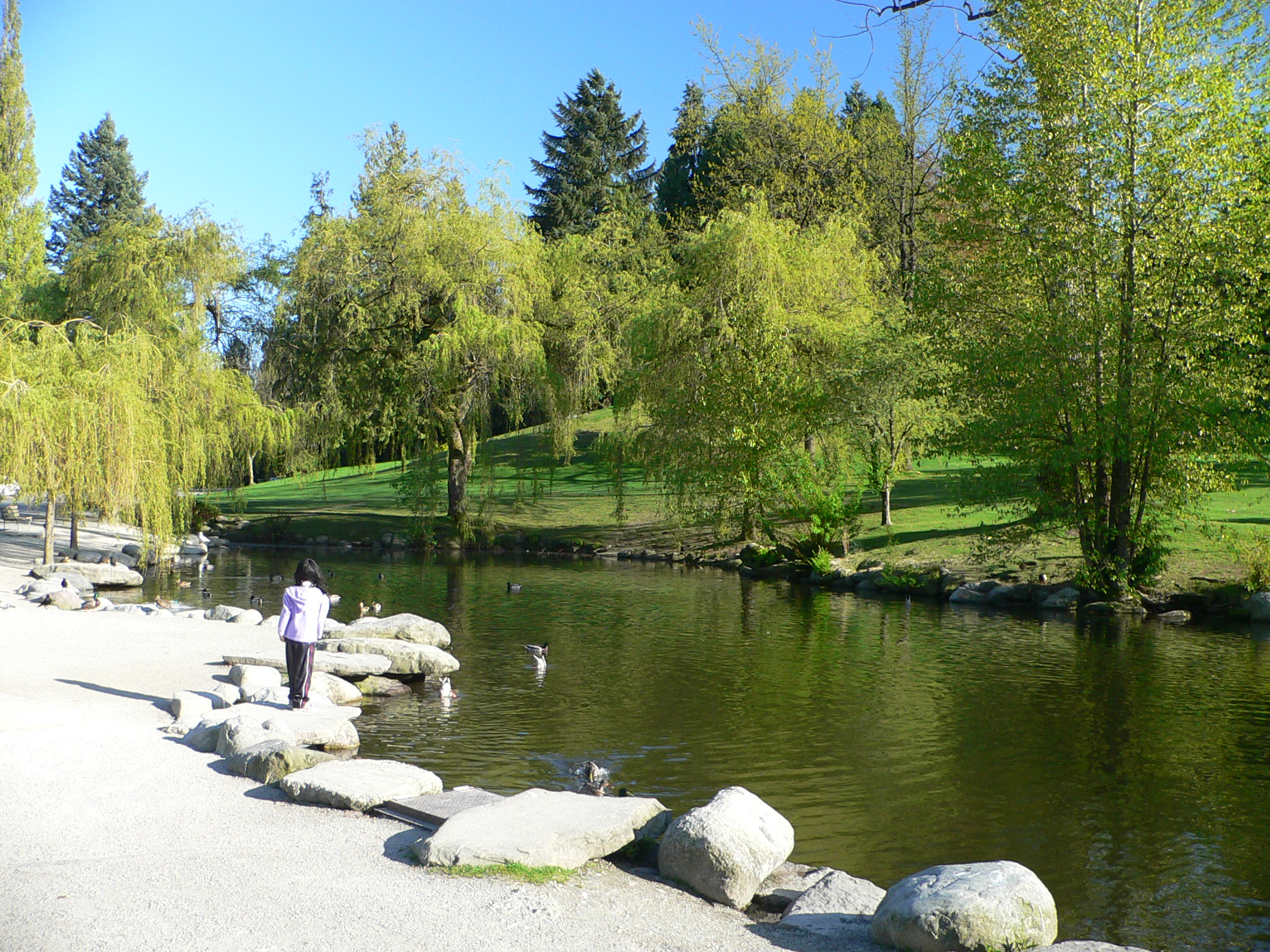
Duck Pond

Queen Elizabeth Park is a 130-acre municipal park located in Vancouver, British Columbia, Canada. It is located on top of Little Mountain approximately 125 metres (410 ft) above sea level and is the location of former basalt quarries dug in the beginning of the twentieth century to provide materials for roads in the city.

== History ==
Before European settlement, the park was an old-growth forest and a spawning ground for salmon. Grey wolves, elk and bears would frequent the area. The settler population which began in earnest in the 1870s exterminated the grey wolves, elk and bears, chopped down all the old growth forest and paved over the salmon creeks. The salmon creeks that extend from Queen Elizabeth to False Creek do still exist today, however, they have been paved over.

In 1936, the BC Tulip Association suggested the creation of sunken gardens within the old quarries to the city's park board. By the end of that decade, the site had been turned over to the Vancouver Park Board for park and recreation purposes. The park was dedicated by King George VI and his consort, Queen Elizabeth (the mother of Queen Elizabeth II) during their visit to Vancouver in 1939, as King and Queen of Canada. From that time, Park staff incrementally transformed the overgrown hillsides into Canada's first civic arboretum, with a generous donation from the Canadian Pulp and Paper Association. The popular quarry gardens were designed by Park Board Deputy Superintendent Bill Livingstone and were unveiled in the early 1960s.

Prentice Bloedel's gift of $1.25 million funded the open reservoirs and built the country's first geodesic conservatory, which is surrounded by covered walkways, lighted fountains and a sculpture, Henry Moore's Knife Edge Two Piece 1962–65. The Bloedel Floral Conservatory opened on December 6, 1969 amidst much jubilation. Its enclosed tropical garden houses 500 exotic plants and flowers and more than a hundred free-flying tropical birds.

== Attractions ==
There are several other attractions in the park including:

- Arboretum
- Celebration Pavilion
- Bloedel Floral Conservatory
- Fountains/Plaza
- Quarry Gardens
- Painters' Corner
- Sculpture

Several episodes of the long running TV show Stargate SG-1 were filmed there.

== Activities ==
Activities at Queen Elizabeth Park include:

- Pitch and putt golf course
- Little Mountain disc golf course
- Tennis courts
- Lawn bowling club
- Tai Chi
- Jogging

== See also ==
- Royal eponyms in Canada
