= Parcours Ignace-Bourget =

Disc golf course in Quebec, Canada

Coordinates: 45.457554°N 73.603854°W

Course information
- Established: 2009
- Website: www.adgm.ca/fr/parcours-disc-golf-montreal-ignace-bourget

Red
- Holes: 12
- Par: 36
- Length: 1,921 feet (586 m)

White
- Holes: 12
- Par: 36
- Length: 3,214 feet (980 m)

Parcours Ignace-Bourget is a 12-hole disc golf course located in Ignace-Bourget Park in Montreal, Quebec. The course was established on 24 September 2009. It ranks among the most played disc golf courses in Quebec.

== Course details ==
It sports concrete tee pads and twelve Innova DISCatcher baskets. Parcours Ignace-Bourget can be played for free and is open year-round, but holes 6 and 7 are not available during the winter months.

== Tournaments ==
As one of the home courses of the Association Disc Golf Montreal (ADGM) together with Parcours Île Charron, the course hosted the unsanctioned Championnat ADGM in 2009.

== See also ==
- List of disc golf courses in Quebec
