= Battle of Farmington =

The Battle of Farmington is a name given to two different battles during the American Civil War:

- Battle of Farmington, Mississippi, part of the Siege of Corinth, April 29 to May 30, 1862
- Battle of Farmington, Tennessee, October 7, 1863

== See also ==
- Farmington (disambiguation)
