= InterGolf Disc Golf Course =

Disc golf course in Quebec, Canada

Coordinates: 45.424939°N 72.8119329°W

InterGolf Disc Golf Course is a 9-hole disc golf course located at the Centre InterGolf in Granby, Quebec, Canada. The course is set on a low traffic 9-hole ball golf course. It was designed by Peter Lizotte in 2011.

== Tournaments ==
The venue hosts Le Boss de Granby, a PDGA-sanctioned event. It was the final course of the 2013 Québec Disc Golf Tour (QDGT). In 2019, an 18-hole layout was set up for the Série Disque Golf Québec Tour (SDGQ).

== See also ==
- List of disc golf courses in Quebec
