= Parcours de la Frontière =

Disc golf course in Quebec, Canada

Coordinates: 45.045714°N 73.432191°W

Parcours de la Frontière is an 18-hole disc golf course located in Parc Régional St-Bernard in Saint-Bernard-de-Lacolle, Quebec, 4 km (2.5 mi) from the United States border. It was designed by Peter Lizotte and Michel St-Pierre in 2014. The course regularly ranks among the highest-rated disc golf courses in Quebec.

== Tournaments ==
The 2019 Red Robin Open, part of the PDGA-sanctioned 2019 Tournée Pro-Am Disc Golf series was held at the Parcours de la Frontière

== See also ==
- List of disc golf courses in Quebec
