= Parcours des Voltigeurs =

Disc golf course in Quebec, Canada

Coordinates: 45.913678666885°N 72.488624333798°W

Voltigeurs DGC (French: Parcours de disc golf du Parc des Voltigeurs) is an 18-hole disc golf course located in Drummondville, Quebec, Canada. The course was established in 2015 in collaboration with Club Disc Golf Drummondville, Albatroz Disc Golf, Peter Lizotte and the city of Drummondville. It is the home course of the Association Disc Golf Centre-du-Québec (ADGCQ). Voltigeurs DGC ranks among the highest-rated disc golf courses in Quebec.

== Tournaments ==
La Bataille des Voltigeurs, part of the PDGA-sanctioned Tournée Pro-Am Disc Golf series, was held at the Voltigeurs disc golf course in early June 2018 and 2019

== See also ==
- List of disc golf courses in Quebec
