= Toronto Island Park Disc Golf Course =

Disc golf course in Ontario, Canada

Coordinates: 43°37′29″N 79°21′37″W

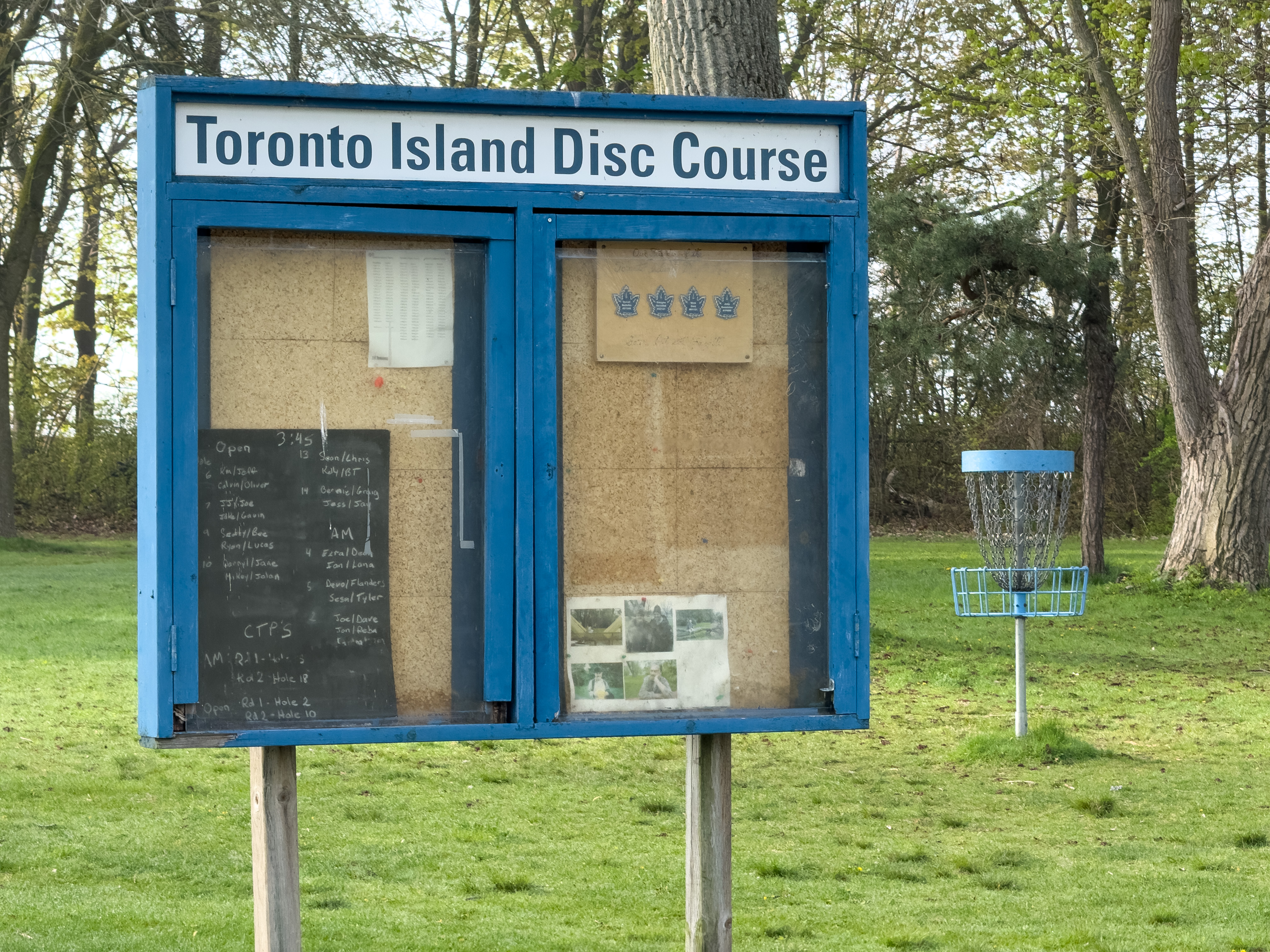
- Signage and practice basket at the beginning of the course

Course information
- Established: 1980
- Website: www.ontariodiscsports.ca/courses/toronto-island

Toronto Island Park Disc Golf Course is a world-class 18-hole disc golf course located in Toronto, Ontario, Canada. Set on the western side of Ward's Island, the course offers a view of the Toronto skyline and was one of 12-time PDGA World Champion Ken Climo's favorite courses. It was established in 1980 by Toronto Island Disc Golf Experience (TIDE) in partnership with the City of Toronto Parks Department and expanded in 2017 by Christopher Lowcock. Toronto Island Park Disc Golf Course hosted the Disc Golf World Championships in 1987.

== Course details ==
The course features a dual asphalt tee pad setup with dual targets; there are 18 Prodigy baskets for long pins and 18 DGC Mach V baskets for short pins. The course is available to the public at no charge, on a first-come, first-served, walk-on basis.

== Tournaments ==
Toronto Island Park Disc Golf Course has hosted several PDGA-sanctioned events, including the Toronto Island Open tournament in 1984 and the Disc Golf World Championships in 1987. The course also hosted the Canadian Open and the Toronto Island Maple Leaf Canadian National Championships, two of the most prestigious disc golf tournaments in Canada. Since 2017, the Toronto Island Maple Leaf is a USDGC qualifying tournament.

== See also ==
List of disc golf courses in Ontario

Ken Westerfield disc golf pioneer.
