= Farmington, Nova Scotia =

Farmington, Nova Scotia could be the following places in Nova Scotia:

- Farmington in Cumberland County
- Farmington in Lunenburg County
