= Farmington Historic District (Farmington, North Carolina) =

Historic district in North Carolina, United States

- U.S. National Register of Historic Places
- U.S. Historic district
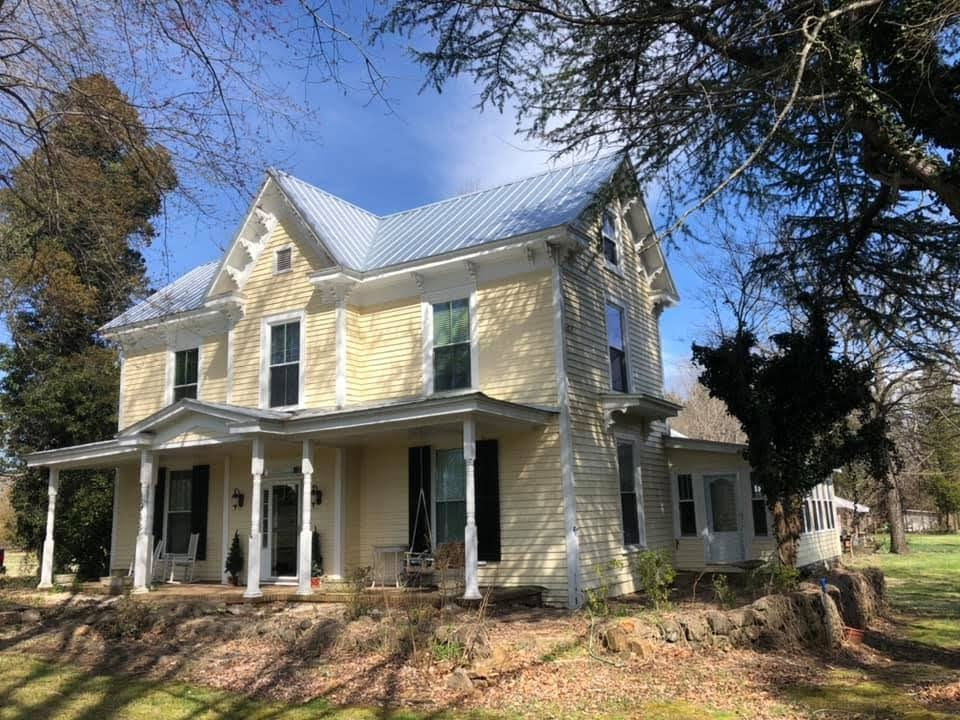
- Charles F. and Jane A. Bahnson House

- Location within North Carolina Location within the United States
- Location: Farmington Rd., NC 801 North, Cemetery Rd., Roland Rd., and Hartman Lane, Farmington, North Carolina
- Coordinates: 36°00′57″N 80°31′57″W
- Area: 324 acres (131 ha)
- Built: c. 1850
- Architect: Multiple
- Architectural style: Greek Revival, Italianate, Queen Anne, Colonial Revival, Bungalow/Craftsman
- NRHP reference No.: 10001059
- Added to NRHP: December 27, 2010

Farmington Historic District is a national historic district located at Farmington, North Carolina, United States. The district encompasses 87 contributing buildings, 2 contributing sites, and 3 contributing objects in the unincorporated community of Farmington. It primarily includes residential, agricultural, commercial, religious, and educational buildings with notable examples of Greek Revival, Italianate, Queen Anne, American Craftsman, and Colonial Revival style architecture. Notable contributing resources include the Farmington Community Cemetery (1881), Wiseman-Kennen House (1873), Dr. Lester P. and Helen Bahnson Martin House (1936, 1987), Williard Garage (1920s), Francis Marion Johnson Store (1873, 1922), Charles F. and Jane A. Bahnson House (c. 1878), Jarvis-Horne Store (c. 1870, 1910, 1940), Brock Marker (c. 1925), Farmington School Auditorium, Cafeteria, and Home Economics Classroom (1950, 1955), Farmington School Agricultural Building (1936), (former) Farmington Baptist Church (1882), Farmington Methodist Church (1882, 1924, 1950), and Farmington Post Office/Barber Shop (1928, 1938).

It was added to the National Register of Historic Places in 2010.
