= Domaine de Rouville Disc Golf Course =

Disc golf course in Quebec, Canada

Domaine de Rouville DGC
- Interactive map of Domaine de Rouville DGC

Club information
- 45.508672°N 73.145544°W
- Coordinates: 45.508672°N 73.145544°W
- Location: Saint-Jean-Baptiste, Quebec, Canada
- Total holes: 18

Domaine de Rouville DGC is a private 18-hole (formerly 12-hole) disc golf course located at the Domaine de Rouville golf course, in Saint-Jean-Baptiste, Quebec. Designed in 2013 by Mark Doucette, Gabriel Rondeau, and Paul Belyea on the grounds of an unused 9-hole golf club, it is widely regarded as one of the top disc golf courses in Quebec.

== Tournaments ==
The course has hosted several PDGA-sanctioned events, including the 2019 Championnat Oasis and the 2018 Championnat Provincial de Disc Golf du Québec (CPDGQ), part of the 2018 Tournée Pro-Am Disc Golf series. A longer 18-hole layout, sometimes known as CPDGQ course, is set up temporarily on the grounds of the Domaine de Rouville for the Championnat Provincial de Disc Golf du Québec.

== See also ==
- List of disc golf courses in Quebec
