= Camp Nominingue Disc Golf Course =

Disc golf course in Quebec, Canada

Coordinates: 46.380478°N 75.016194°W

Camp Nominingue DCG is a private 18-hole dual tee pad disc golf course in Nominingue, Quebec, Canada. It features artistic woodpile obstacles in a planned forest setting. The course is located opposite (and is owned by) Camp Nominingue, on the northeastern side of the road, and it is open to the public year-round for free. Players can rent disc golf discs at the l'Île de France auberge, at Les Toits du Monde accommodations, or the Dépanneur l'Essentiel nearby. The course was designed in 2017 by amateur disc golfer Don Lane and professional disc golf course designer Christopher Lowcock.

== History ==
Heiko Dechau, local chef at the l'Île de France auberge and disc golfer, pitched the idea of a disc golf course to then Camp Nominingue director Grant McKenna, who in turn reached out to the Association de Développement de Nominingue (ADN) and the municipality of Nominingue. Approximately twenty local volunteers helped create the course.

== Tournaments ==
A longer, temporary course called Club et Hôtel du golf Nominingue DGC was set up approximately 2 km North of Camp Nominingue DGC proper to host the PDGA-sanctioned Le Phé-Nominingue tournament in October 2019. The tournament consisted of one round at the Camp Nominingue Disc Golf Course and two rounds at the Club et Hôtel du golf Nominingue DGC. The latter was designed by Christopher Lowcock on most of the land of the Club et Hôtel du Golf Nominingue ball golf course and featured temporary Prodigy baskets.

== See also ==
- List of disc golf courses in Quebec
