= Farmington Public Schools =

Farmington Public Schools may refer to:

- Farmington Public Schools (Connecticut)
- Farmington Public Schools (Michigan)

== See also ==
- Farmington School District, school district in Arkansas
- Farmington Municipal Schools, school district in New Mexico
