= Farmington Township, Pennsylvania =

Farmington Township, Pennsylvania is the name of several places in the state of Pennsylvania, United States.

- Farmington Township, Clarion County, Pennsylvania
- Farmington Township, Tioga County, Pennsylvania
- Farmington Township, Warren County, Pennsylvania
