= Farmington, Jefferson County, Wisconsin =

Farmington, Wisconsin
- Town
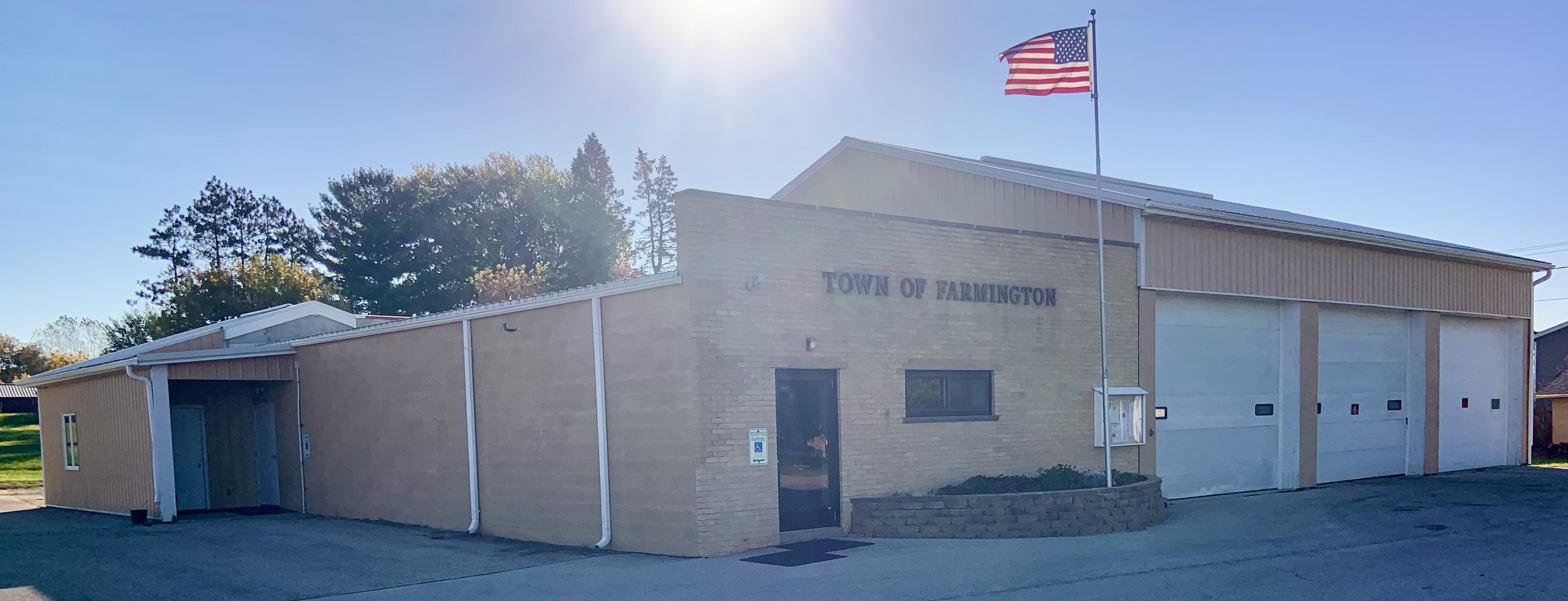
- Town hall

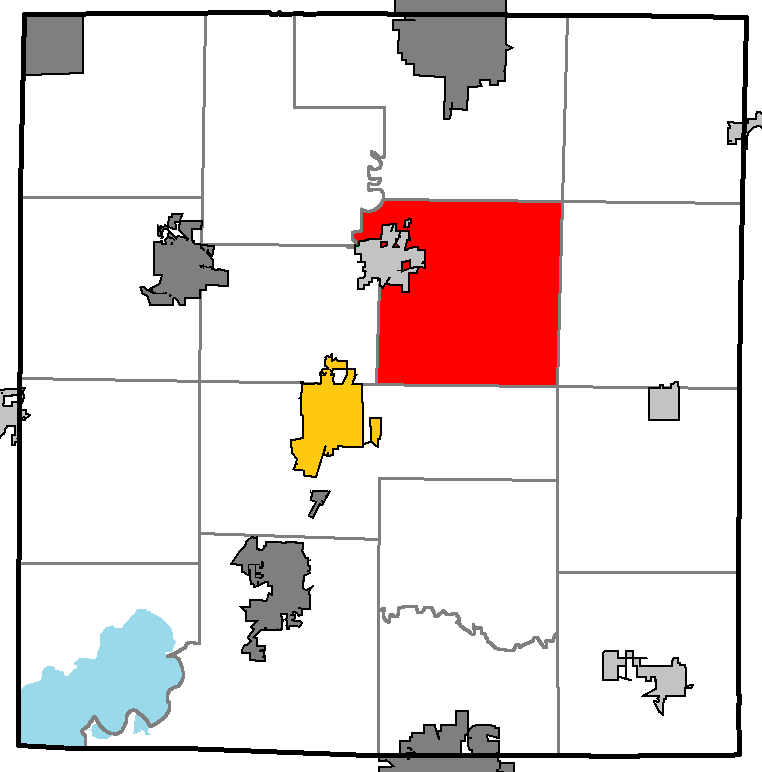
- Location of Farmington, within Jefferson County

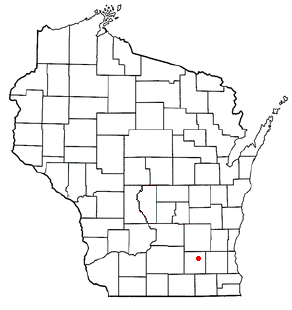
- Location of Farmington, Wisconsin
- Coordinates: 43°3′46″N 88°43′49″W
- Country: United States
- State: Wisconsin
- County: Jefferson

Area
  - Total: 35.1 sq mi (90.9 km^{2})
  - Land: 35.0 sq mi (90.6 km^{2})
  - Water: 0.077 sq mi (0.2 km^{2})
- Elevation: 817 ft (249 m)

Population (2020)
  - Total: 1,407
  - Density: 40.2/sq mi (15.5/km^{2})
- Time zone: UTC-6 (Central (CST))
  - Summer (DST): UTC-5 (CDT)
- FIPS code: 55-25300
- GNIS feature ID: 1583190

Farmington is a town in Jefferson County, Wisconsin, United States. The population as of the 2020 census was 1,407.

== Geography ==
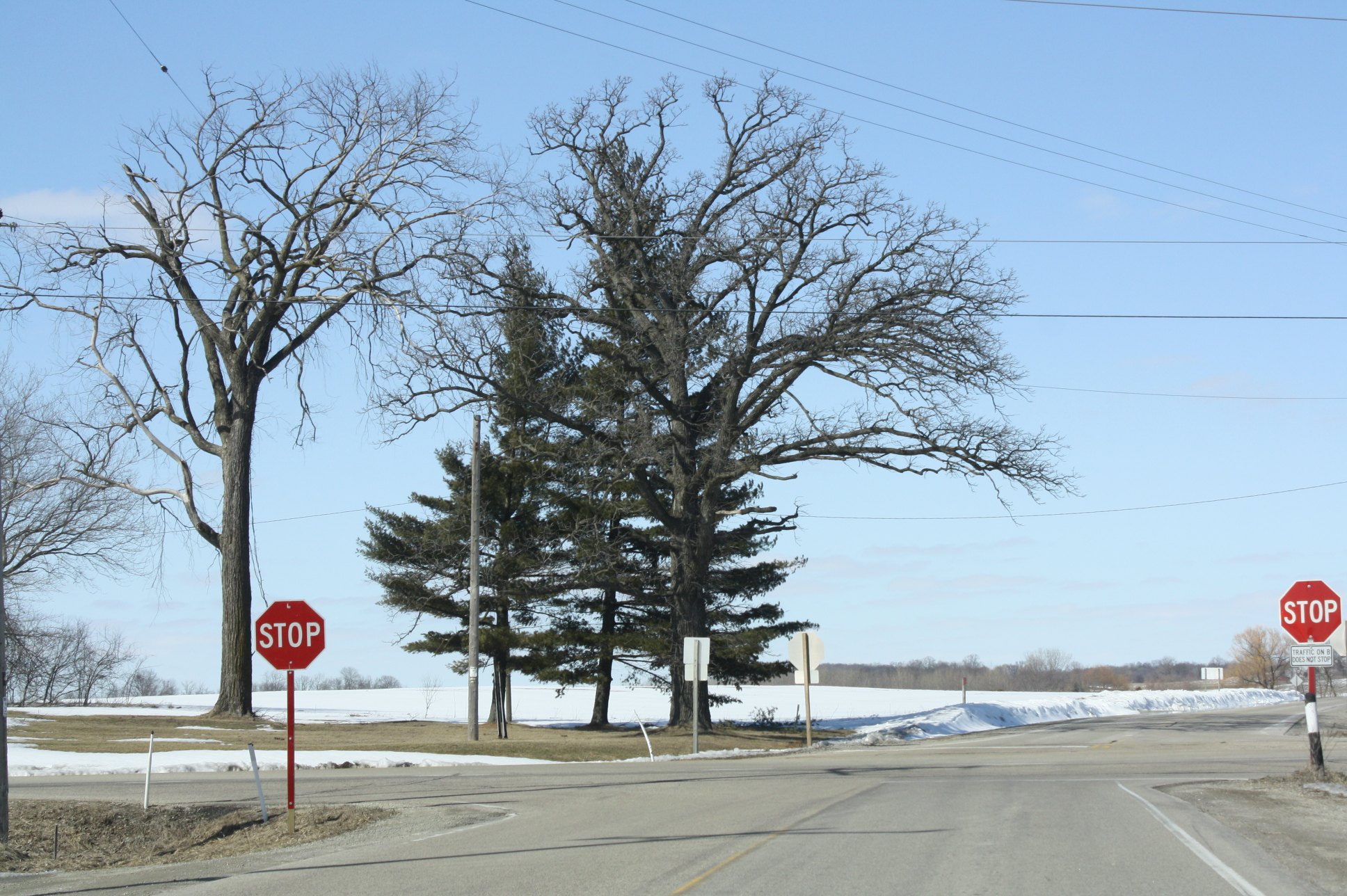
The intersection of County D and B in rural town of Farmington during winter

According to the United States Census Bureau, the town has a total area of 35.1 square miles (90.9 km^{2}), of which 35.0 square miles (90.6 km^{2}) is land and 0.077 square miles (0.2 km^{2}), or 0.27%, is water.

== Demographics ==
As of the census of 2000, there were 1,498 people, 541 households, and 441 families residing in the town. The population density was 41.8 people per square mile (16.2/km^{2}). There were 561 housing units at an average density of 15.7 per square mile (6.0/km^{2}). The racial makeup of the town was 98.13% White, 0.13% African American, 0.13% Native American, 0.13% Asian, 0.93% from other races, and 0.53% from two or more races. Hispanic or Latino of any race were 2.07% of the population.

There were 541 households, out of which 36.2% had children under the age of 18 living with them, 71.7% were married couples living together, 5.5% had a female householder with no husband present, and 18.3% were non-families. 14.0% of all households were made up of individuals, and 4.4% had someone living alone who was 65 years of age or older. The average household size was 2.77 and the average family size was 3.04.

In the town, the population was spread out, with 26.2% under the age of 18, 6.4% from 18 to 24, 30.4% from 25 to 44, 26.3% from 45 to 64, and 10.7% who were 65 years of age or older. The median age was 37 years. For every 100 females, there were 104.6 males. For every 100 females age 18 and over, there were 107.1 males.

The median income for a household in the town was $46,875, and the median income for a family was $57,500. Males had a median income of $38,393 versus $24,943 for females. The per capita income for the town was $20,077. About 2.6% of families and 4.3% of the population were below the poverty line, including 5.1% of those under age 18 and 3.2% of those age 65 or over.
