= Parcours Île Charron =

Disc golf course in Quebec, Canada

Coordinates: 45.583362°N 73.487289°W

Parcours Île Charron (French: Parcours de disque-golf de l'île Charron), commonly known as "PIC", is an 18-hole disc golf course with dual concrete tees on Charron Island, in Longueuil, Quebec, to the northeast of Montreal. It was designed in 2012 by Mark Doucette from the Association Disc Golf Montréal (ADGM), and is set around the Centre d'épuration Rive-Sud (CERS) water treatment plant. The course is widely regarded as one of the top disc golf courses in Quebec.

== Tournaments ==
The course is home to the PDGA-sanctioned La Grosse Coupe tournament every year since 2016.

== See also ==
- List of disc golf courses in Quebec
