= Farmington, Polk County, Wisconsin =

Farmington, Wisconsin
- Town
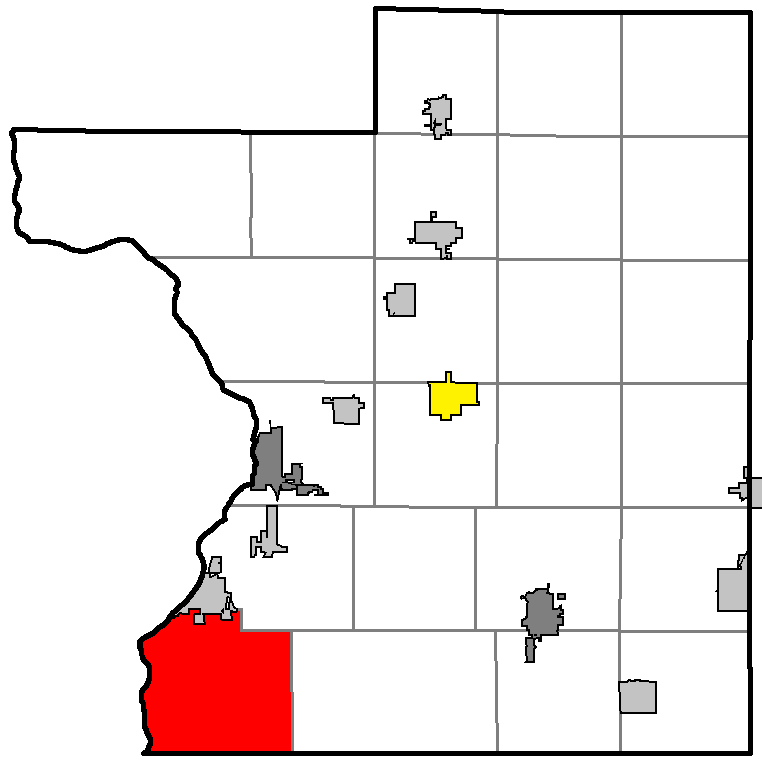
- Location of Farmington, within Polk County

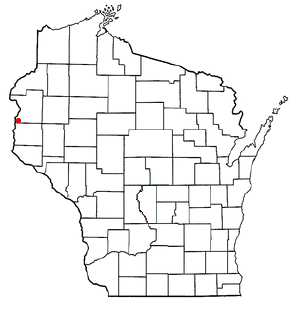
- Location of Farmington, Polk County, Wisconsin
- Coordinates: 45°15′38″N 92°41′5″W
- Country: United States
- State: Wisconsin
- County: Polk

Area
  - Total: 44.9 sq mi (116.3 km^{2})
  - Land: 44.0 sq mi (113.9 km^{2})
  - Water: 0.93 sq mi (2.4 km^{2})
- Elevation: 1,030 ft (314 m)

Population (2020)
  - Total: 1,904
  - Density: 43.30/sq mi (16.72/km^{2})
- Time zone: UTC-6 (Central (CST))
  - Summer (DST): UTC-5 (CDT)
- Area codes: 715 & 534
- FIPS code: 55-25350
- GNIS feature ID: 1583192
- Website: http://www.farmingtontown.com

Farmington is a town in Polk County, Wisconsin, United States. The population was 1,904 at the 2020 census. The unincorporated communities of East Farmington and Horse Creek are located in the town.

== Geography ==
According to the United States Census Bureau, the town has a total area of 44.9 square miles (116.3 km^{2}), of which 44.0 square miles (113.9 km^{2}) is land and 0.9 square mile (2.4 km^{2}) (2.07%) is water.

== Demographics ==
As of the census of 2000, there were 1,625 people, 525 households, and 429 families residing in the town. The population density was 37.0 people per square mile (14.3/km^{2}). There were 555 housing units at an average density of 12.6 per square mile (4.9/km^{2}). The racial makeup of the town was 97.78% White, 0.43% African American, 0.18% Native American, 0.49% Asian, 0.12% from other races, and 0.98% from two or more races. Hispanic or Latino of any race were 0.92% of the population.

There were 525 households, out of which 45.7% had children under the age of 18 living with them, 71.4% were married couples living together, 4.6% had a female householder with no husband present, and 18.1% were non-families. 15.0% of all households were made up of individuals, and 4.4% had someone living alone who was 65 years of age or older. The average household size was 3.10 and the average family size was 3.43.

In the town, the population was spread out, with 32.4% under the age of 18, 7.4% from 18 to 24, 30.5% from 25 to 44, 22.6% from 45 to 64, and 7.1% who were 65 years of age or older. The median age was 34 years. For every 100 females, there were 103.4 males. For every 100 females age 18 and over, there were 102.4 males.

The median income for a household in the town was $58,833, and the median income for a family was $62,969. Males had a median income of $43,676 versus $23,958 for females. The per capita income for the town was $20,974. About 1.4% of families and 2.9% of the population were below the poverty line, including 2.5% of those under age 18 and 9.6% of those age 65 or over.
