= Infinite Discs =

Disc golf company

- Company type: Private
- Industry: Disc golf equipment
- Founded: 2012 (14 years ago) in Logan, Utah, United States
- Headquarters: Logan, Utah, United States
- Number of locations: 3 stores (2020)
- Key people: Alan Barker, president
- Products: Disc golf equipment, mobile app, course directory
- Revenue: 2,840,000 ±10000 United States dollar (2020)
- Number of employees: 16 (2020)
- Website: Official website

Infinite Discs is an American disc golf equipment retail company based in Logan, Utah. The company also maintains a disc golf scorekeeping app, a course directory, a round tracking website, and a line of discs.

== History ==
The company was founded by amateur disc golfer Alan Barker on October 15, 2012 in Logan, Utah. Barker was initially making real estate websites, until one of his employees introduced him to disc golf. They later created Disc Golf Reviewer, a review blog with Amazon and eBay affiliate links. To grow beyond affiliate marketing, Barker looked into ways to better monetize his blog. He considered striking a partnership with Altitude Disc Golf, a local Utah disc golf retailer, but the company was going out of business. He offered to buy it out, but eventually launched Infinite Discs.

== Company overview ==
Infinite Discs is one of the largest disc golf retailers in the United States, with three brick-and-mortar locations (in Logan, Utah, in Pocatello, Idaho, and in St. George, Utah) and an online store with 50,000 discs in stock.

=== Infinite Tournaments ===
Infinite Tournaments is an online platform for running tournaments, raising funds, and providing player ratings. The platform is notably used by the Next Gen Tour.

=== Infinite Discs Line ===
In early 2018, Infinite Discs released a line of disc golf discs manufactured by Innova Champion Discs in the United States. The molds follow an Ancient Egyptian-themed naming pattern. Later in 2020 Infinite Discs Released a follow-up line of disc molds following a naming pattern of Pre-Columbian era civilizations of Central and South America. Infinite discs are sold exclusively by Infinite Discs in both sets and individually. In 2020, Infinite Discs was the 6th most popular brand of discs among Utahn players, after Innova, Discraft, and trilogy brands (Dynamic Discs, Latitude 64°, and Westside).

Infinite Discs Molds as of June 2020
Distance Drivers	Fairway Drivers	Midrange	Putt and Approach
Emperor	Centurion	Anubis	Myth
Pharaoh	Exodus	Chariot	Scarab
Slab	Scepter	Ra	Tomb
Aztec*	Sphinx	Inca*	Cohort
Maya*			Ruin
			Alpaca*

== State of Disc Golf Survey ==
Since at least 2014, Infinite Discs has been publishing the State of Disc Golf Survey, a yearly account of the state of the disc golf industry. Data collected from the survey plays an important role in assessing the growth of the sport in terms of market trends and consumer habits.

== Sponsorships ==
Events

In 2019, Infinite Discs Idaho sponsored a Fourth of July disc golf event in Pocatello. Infinite Discs is one of the primary sponsors of the Cache Valley Disc Golf Club. Since 2020, it is the official vendor of the Ledgestone Insurance Open.

Players

In 2020, Infinite Discs sponsored 108 American disc golf players from 35 states.

== See also ==
- List of disc golf brands and manufacturers
- UDisc
