= Farmington, British Columbia =

Farmington
- Location of Farmington in British Columbia
- Coordinates: 55°54′00″N 120°30′00″W
- Country: Canada
- Province: British Columbia
- Area codes: 250, 778

Farmington is an unincorporated settlement in the Peace Country of northeastern British Columbia, Canada, located at the confluence of Coal Creek and the Kiskatinaw River.
