= Saint-Jean-Baptiste, Quebec =

Saint-Jean-Baptiste
- Municipality
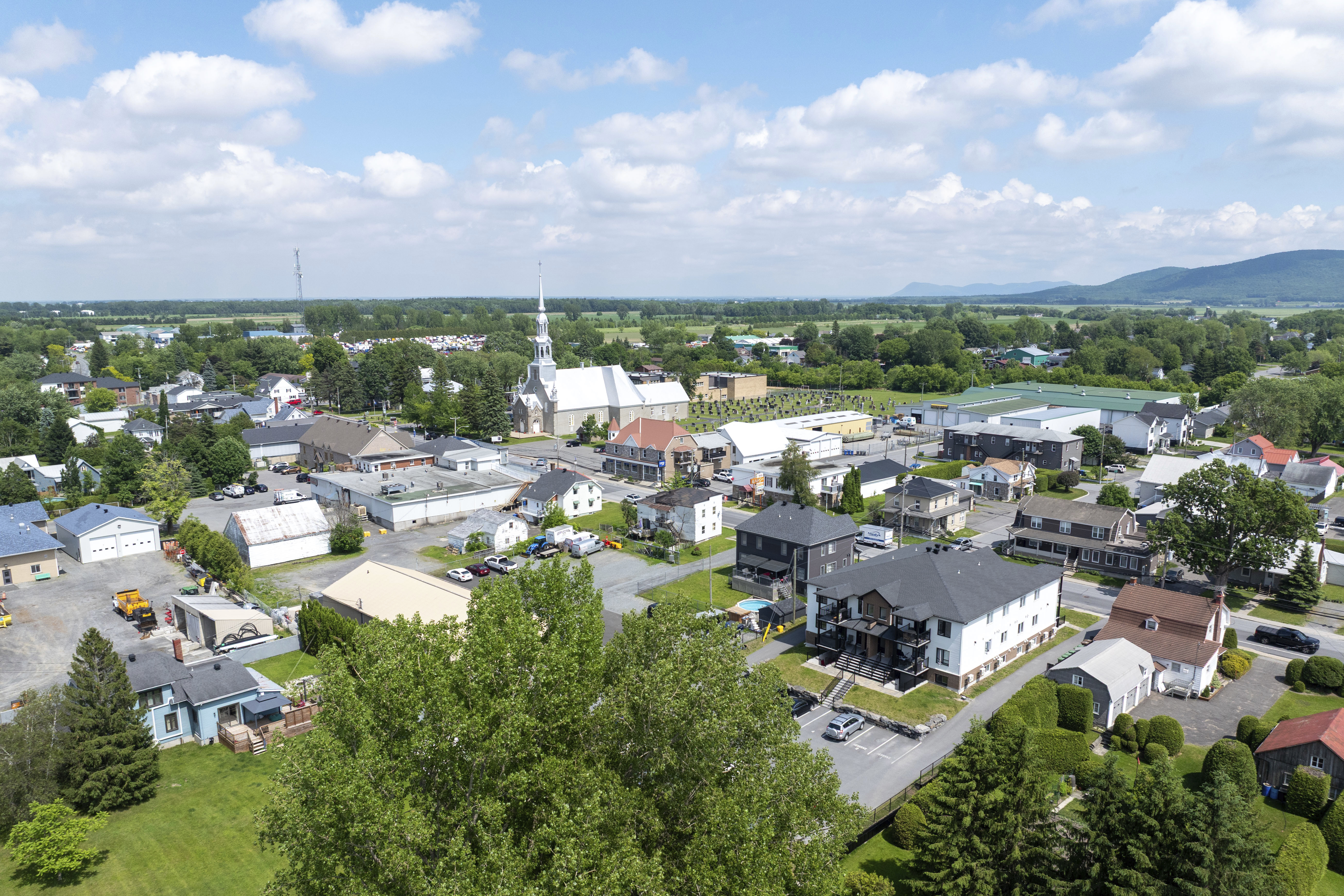
- Saint-Jean-Baptiste in 2026

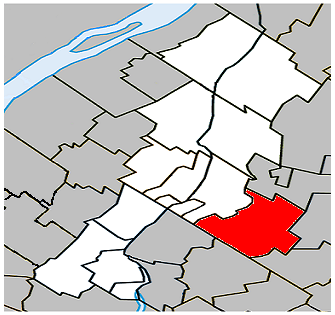
- Location within La Vallée-du-Richelieu RCM

- Location in southern Quebec
- Coordinates: 45°31′N 73°07′W
- Country: Canada
- Province: Quebec
- Region: Montérégie
- RCM: La Vallée-du-Richelieu
- Constituted: July 1, 1855

Government
  - Mayor: Marilyn Nadeau
  - Federal riding: Beloeil—Chambly
  - Prov. riding: Borduas

Area
  - Total: 73.00 km^{2} (28.19 sq mi)
  - Land: 72.36 km^{2} (27.94 sq mi)

Population (2021)
  - Total: 3,179
  - Density: 43.9/km^{2} (114/sq mi)
  - Pop 2016-2021: ▲2.3%
  - Dwellings: 1,386
- Time zone: UTC−5 (EST)
  - Summer (DST): UTC−4 (EDT)
- Postal code(s): J0L 2B0
- Area codes: 450 and 579
- Highways: R-227
- Website: www.msjb.qc.ca

Saint-Jean-Baptiste (French pronunciation: [sɛ̃ ʒɑ̃ batist]) is a municipality in the Montérégie region of Quebec, a Canadian province. The population as of the Canada 2021 Census was 3,179. It is located within La Vallée-du-Richelieu Regional County Municipality in a valley between Mont Saint-Hilaire and Mont Rougemont.

On November 4, 1998 it moved from Rouville Regional County Municipality to La Vallée-du-Richelieu Regional County Municipality.

== Demographics ==
=== Population ===
Population trend:

Census	Population	Change (%)
2021	3,179	▲2.3%
2016	3,107	▼2.6%
2011	3,191	▲5.1%
2006	3,035	▲12.2%
2001	2,704	▼7.2%
1996	2,913	▼1.4%
1991	2,953	▲8.9%
1986	2,711	▼0.6%
1981	2,726	▲17.7%
1976	2,317	▲17.0%
1971	1,980	▲10.2%
1966	1,797	▲20.8%
1961	1,488	▲13.8%
1956	1,308	▲4.6%
1951	1,251	▲11.4%
1941	1,123	▲1.0%
1931	1,112	▼1.4%
1921	1,128	▼9.5%
1911	1,246	▼4.0%
1901	1,298	▼10.8%
1891	1,455	▼16.4%
1881	1,740	▼10.9%
1871	1,953	▼7.3%
1861	2,106	N/A

=== Language ===
Mother tongue language (2021)

Language	Population	Pct (%)
French only	3,065	96.4%
English only	55	1.7%
Both English and French	20	0.6%
Other languages	40	1.3%

== Education ==
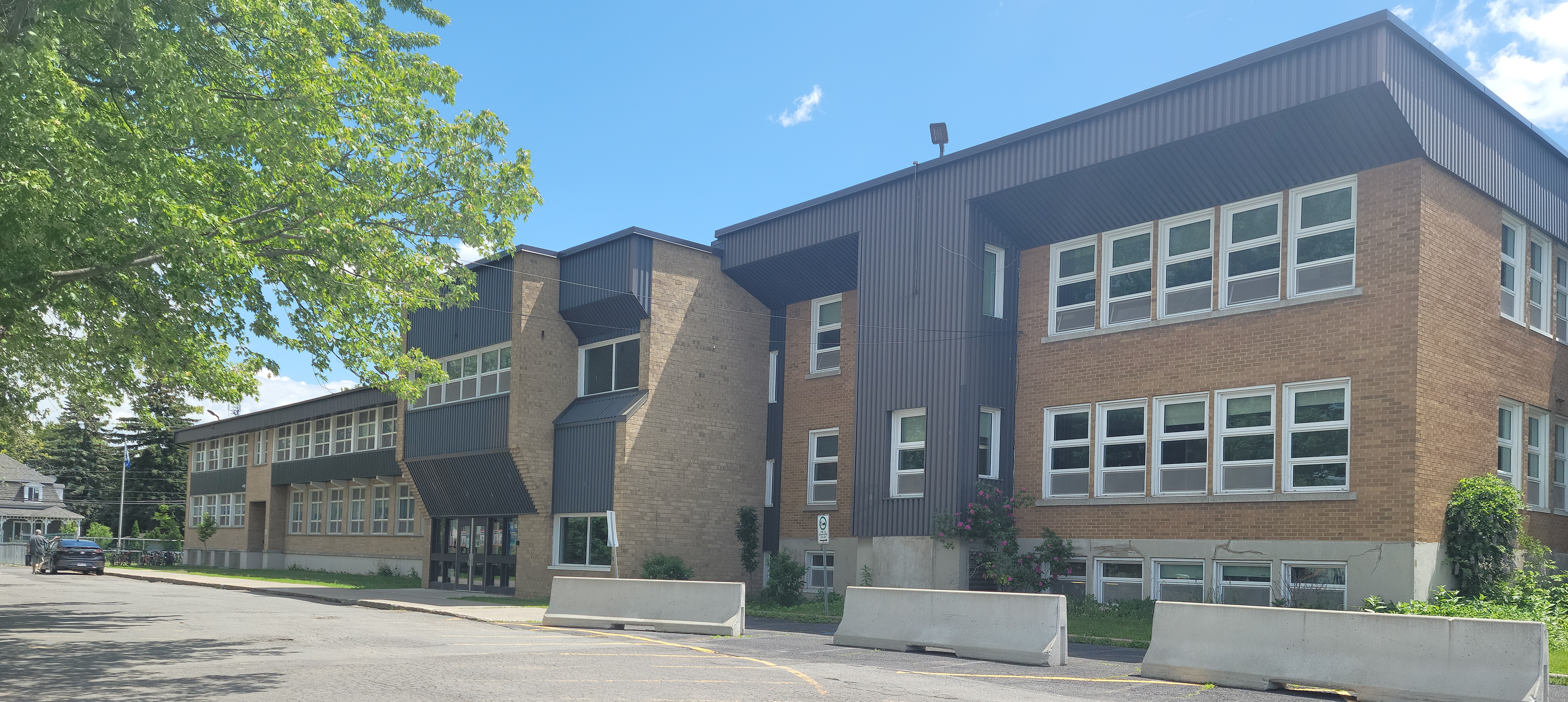
Amitié elementary school, in the village of Saint-Jean-Baptiste (Quebec), in June 2022

The South Shore Protestant Regional School Board previously served the municipality.

== Photo gallery ==
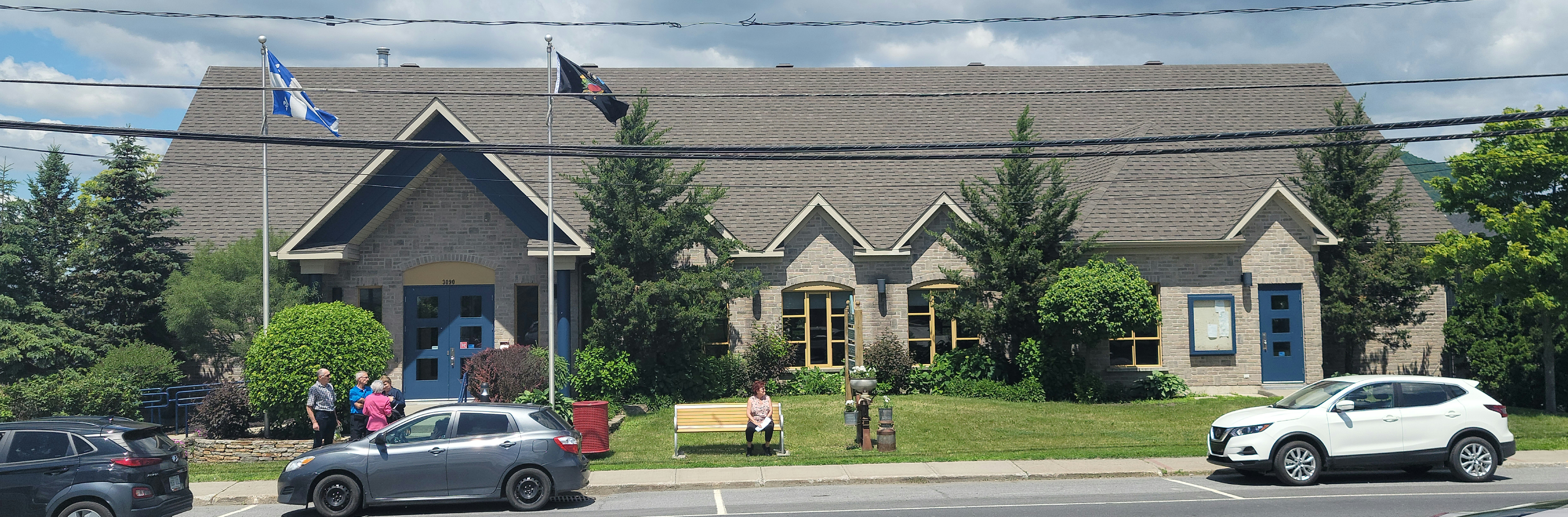
Community center located opposite the church, on Principale Street

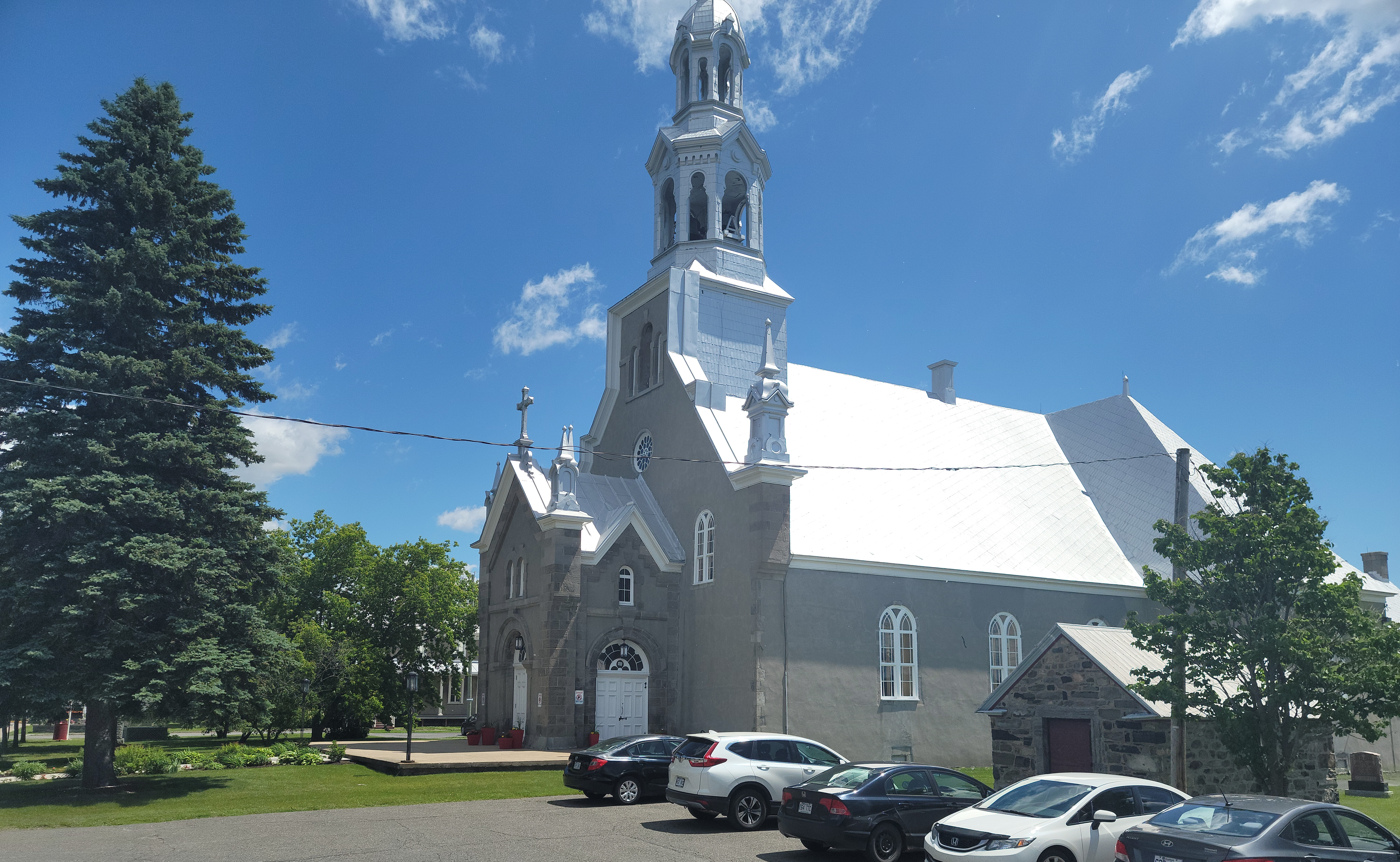
church of Saint-Jean-Baptiste and the mass grave

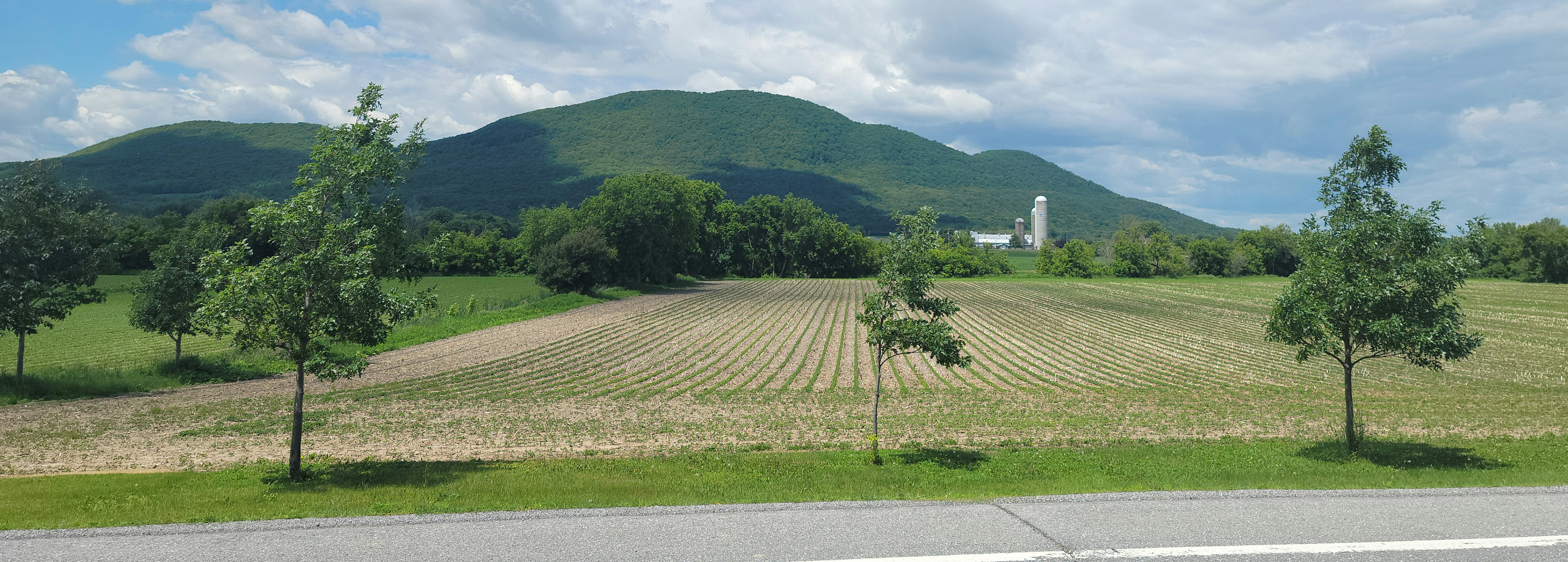
View of Mont Saint-Hilaire and crop fields from Route 229 (north of the village of Saint-Jean-Baptiste)

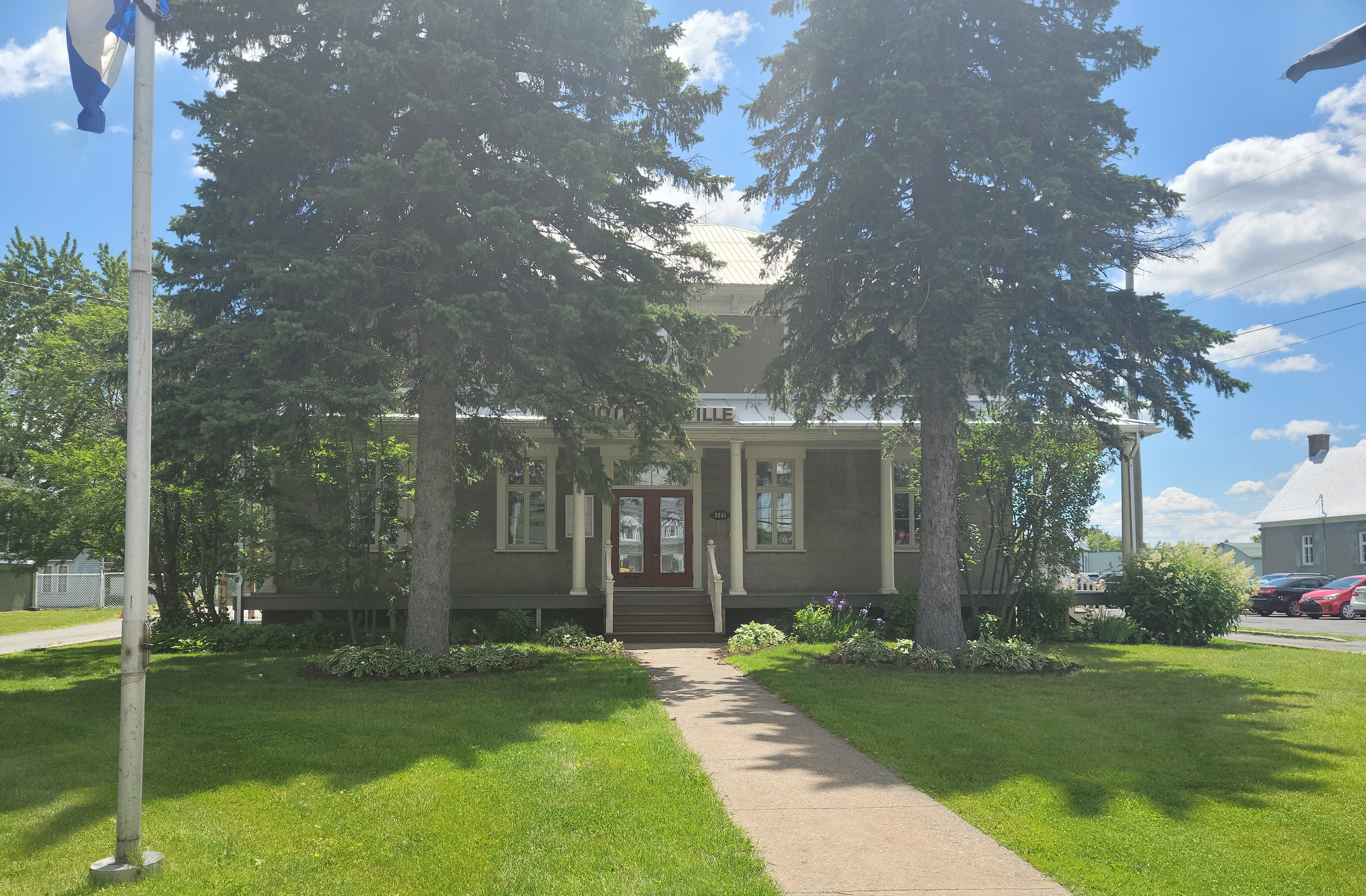
View of the front facade of the town hall, located next to the church

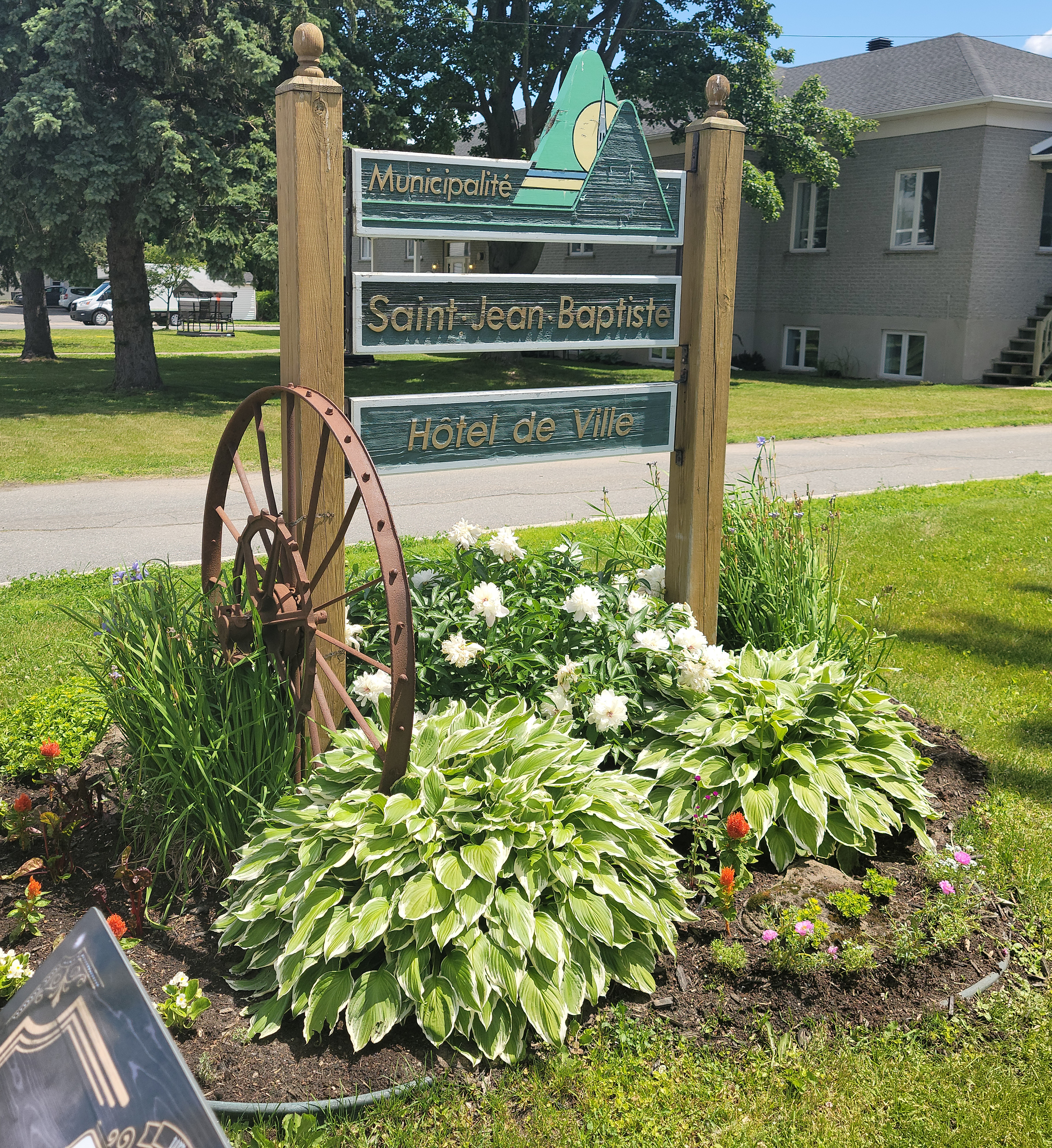
Information panel installed in front of the town hall

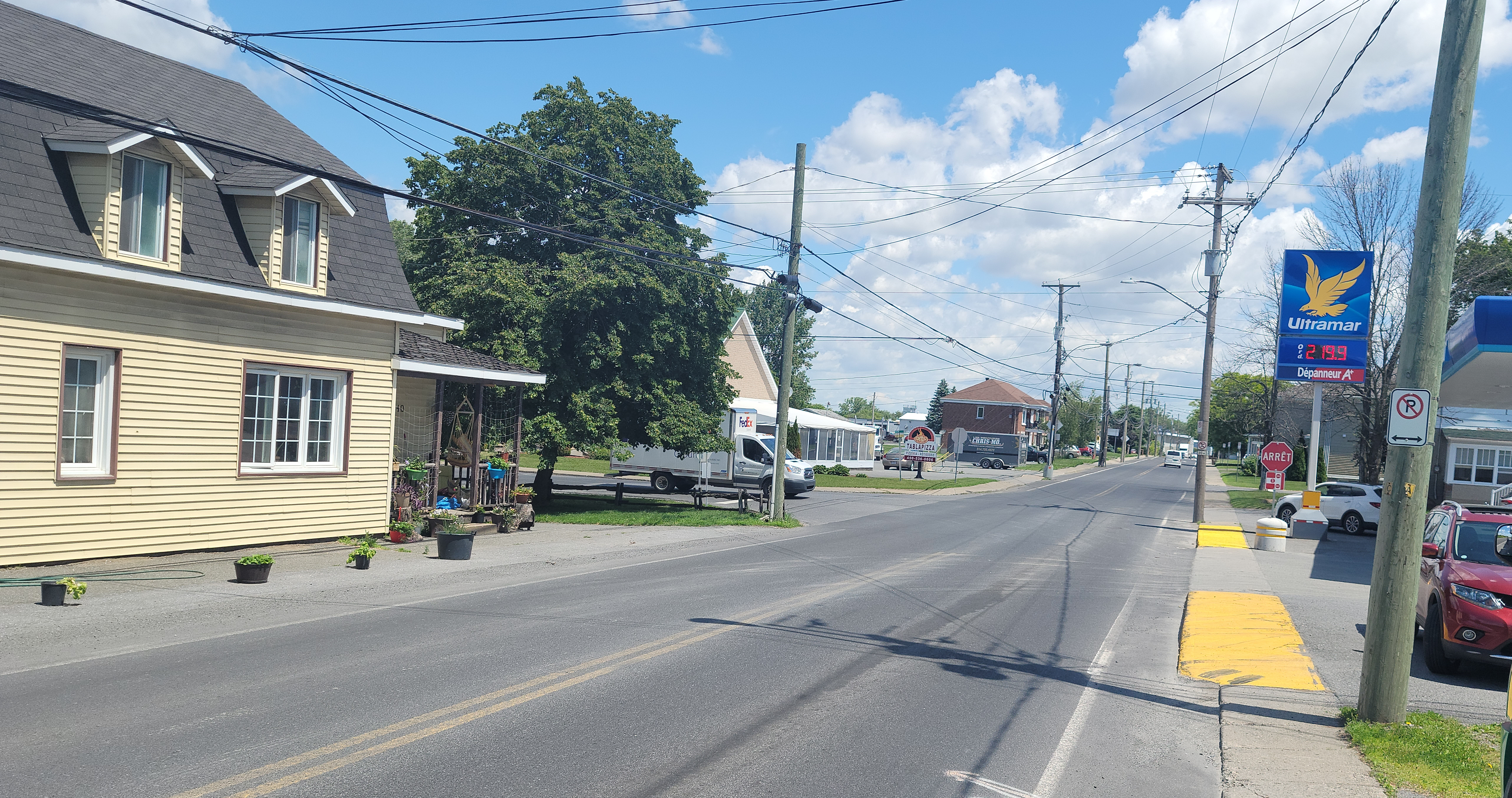
View of rue Principale (near the corner of chemin de Rouville), on the south side of the village

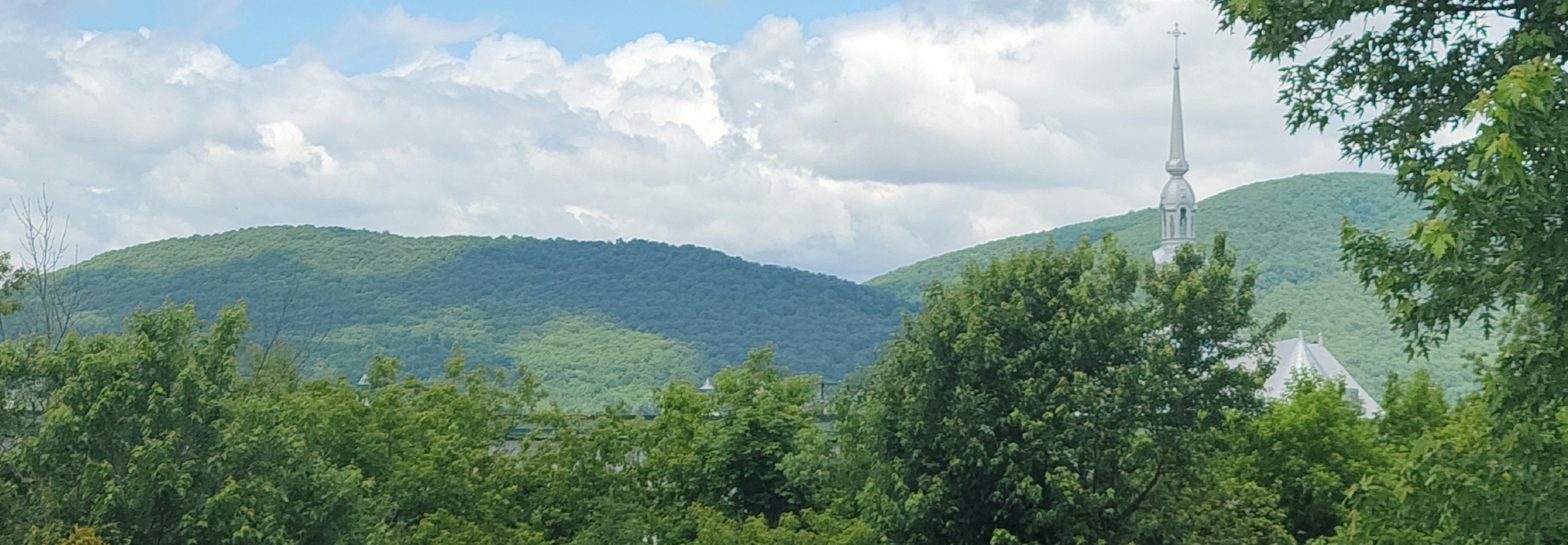
view of Mont Saint-Hilaire (in the background) and the steeple of the church of the village of Saint-Jean-Baptiste

== See also ==
- List of municipalities in Quebec
