= UDisc =

Mobile disc golf app and website

- Developers: Matt Krueger; Josh Lichti
- Initial release: 2012; 14 years ago
- Size: 112.6 MB
- Available in: 9 languages
- List of languages Czech, Dutch, English, Estonian, Finnish, French, German, Norwegian Bokmål, Swedish
- License: Proprietary software
- Website: Official website

UDisc (/judɪsk/) is a disc golf app for scorekeeping, statistics, and discovery for smartphones and tablet computers running the Android or iOS operating system. The app is also compatible with Android's Wear OS and Apple Watch.

It gives access to an extensive community-driven course directory with user-submitted course condition updates, hole-by-hole navigation information about course layouts, and a chronological list of local PDGA-sanctioned events. Users can track the rounds they played, measure throws, track various performance metrics, and compete in worldwide leaderboards.

The app can be downloaded and used for free, but an optional in-app paid subscription to UDisc Pro unlocks more features.

== History ==
The app was developed by Matthew Krueger and Josh Lichti, and initially released in 2012. In 2018, the PDGA partnered with UDisc and announced that "members who are current in 2019 will receive a free UDisc Pro subscription that includes unlimited scoring, statistics, and automatic scorecard syncing with friends." Starting 2022, UDisc Pro will not be included with PDGA memberships.

In late 2017, UDisc implemented an integration with Dynamic Discs Winter Marksman leagues worldwide. In June 2020, UDisc released an online version of their course directory.

== UDisc Live ==
UDisc Live is the official scoring app for real-time statistics at various tournaments, including all PDGA National Tour and Disc Golf Pro Tour (DGPT) events from 2016 until 2024, when the DGPT announced they would move to the PDGA's proprietary Live Scoring platform. Data collected using the app played an important role in the development of the sport's key statistics for comparing players.

== Release Point ==
Since June 2018, UDisc's Release Point blog has published independent disc golf research and commentary based on data gathered from UDisc app users.
