= Crex Carpet Company =

The Crex Carpet Company was a manufacturing company based in St. Paul, Minnesota which produced binder twine and grass rugs from 1898 until 1935.

== Description ==
The Crex Carpet Company was founded in Oshkosh, Wisconsin in 1898 as the Northwestern Grass Twine Company. Responding to farmers need for binder twine, the company was founded to use the wild marsh plant called wiregrass (Carex lasiocarpa or Carex stricta) to make twine. The first company president was Michael O'Shaughnessy, who had no business experience but his father had been president of the Alabama Cotton Oil Company.

After O'Shaughnessy met James J. Hill and toured an empty cordage factory, the company moved to St. Paul, Minnesota in 1898 due to its proximity to the railroad and sedge grasses. In Anoka County, wire-sedge covered more than 10,000 acres. The company purchased 30,000 acres in the Columbus and Linwood area, as well as 23,000 acres in Wisconsin.

The company changed its name to the American Grass Twine Company (AGT) the following year. However, wire grass made poor twine and the company stopped production by 1903. Instead, AGT made wiregrass rugs and wicker. The company set up harvest camps in Minnesota and Wisconsin marshes in late summer and fall. Crews would consist of 400 to 500 men. At the camps, the grass was baled and shipped to the factory to be spun into bundles and skeins. Some grass from AGT was sent to New York and made into wicker furniture.

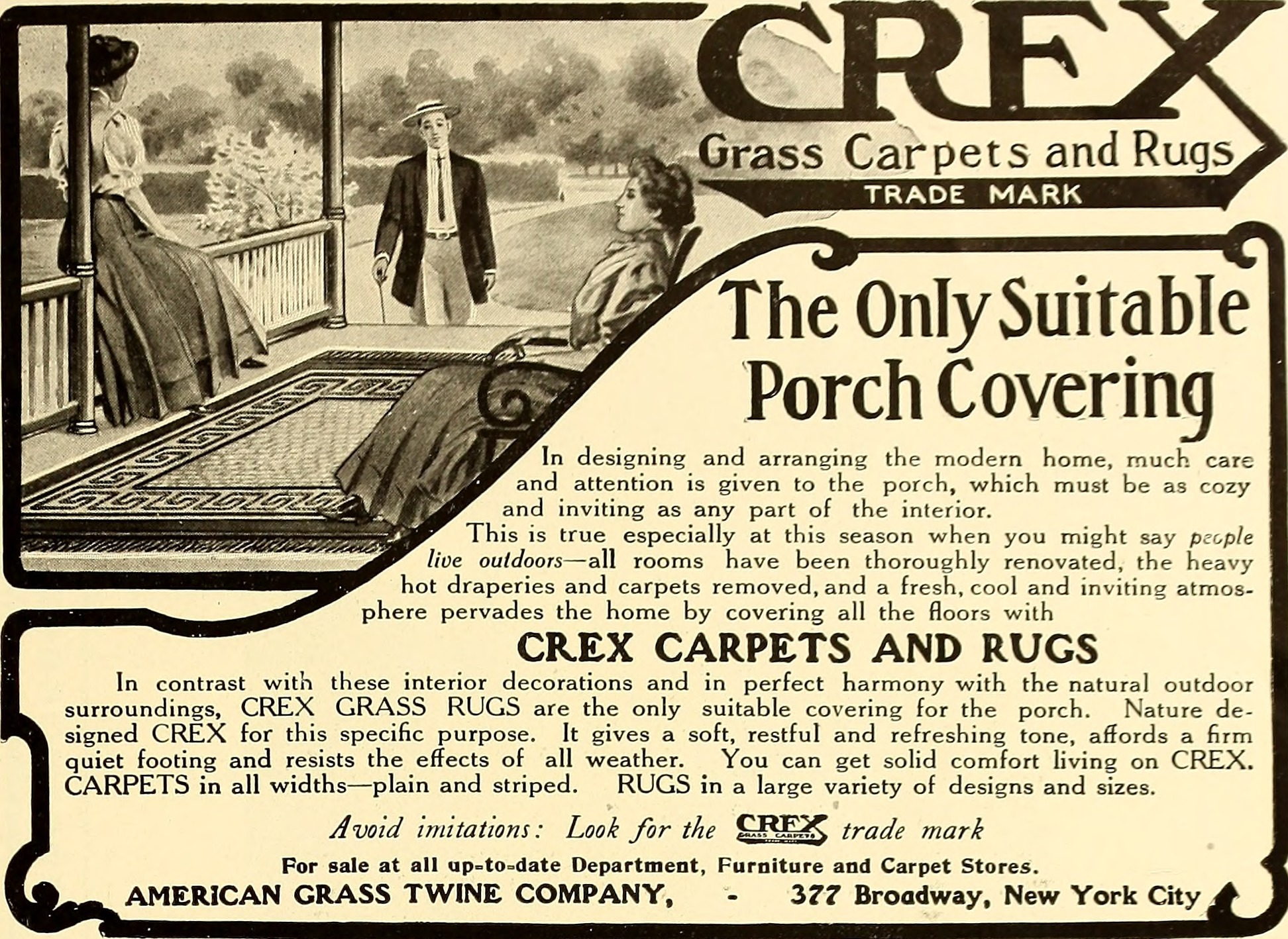
Advertisement for Crex Carpets and Rugs in American Homes and Gardens

AGT also processed the wire grass into rugs, which became the companies most successful product. By 1903, AGT was the largest manufacturing employer in St. Paul, employing nearly 900 workers. The factory was located on Front Ave at Mackubin Street, east of Como Lake.

However, AGT officers and directors committed fraud by lying about the value of the company and paying themselves large dividends. In 1905, as a result of a shareholder lawsuit, the officers resigned and agreed to pay back $640,000. O'Shaughnessy left the company and the city in 1904 or 1905, shortly before his uncle James and other founders were forced out by fraud.

In 1908, AGT became the Crex Carpet Company and went public on the New York Stock Exchange. The company also had a store in New York. The name Crex was derived from the Latin name of the plant. As a carpet company, they phased out wicker production and solely made rugs at the St. Paul factory. From 1907 and 1925, the company profited, employing around 300 people, largely women.

In 1926, company losses began. Impacted by the Great Depression, waning demand, and competition from Japanese grass rugs, the last wire grass harvest took place in 1931. In 1932, the NYSE suspended trading Crex stock. The company filed for bankruptcy in 1935.

== Legacy ==
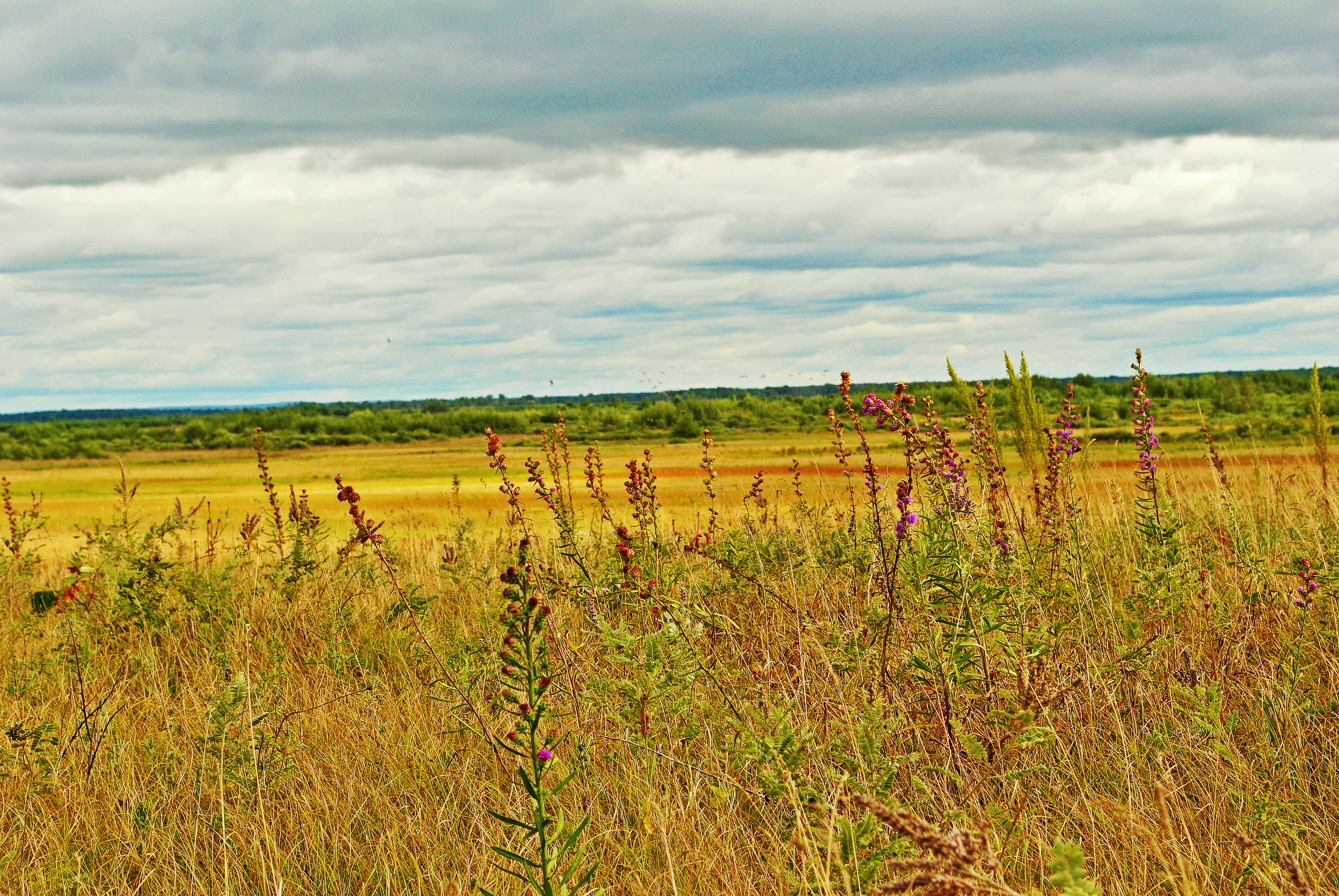
Crex Meadows in Burnett Co., WI.

Crossroads Elementary School now stands on the site of the St. Paul factory.

Land purchased by the company in 1912 in Burnett County, Wisconsin is now the Crex Meadows Wildlife Area. Carlos Avery State Wildlife Management Area near Forest Lake also was owned by the Crex Carpet Company.
