= Fish Lake Wildlife Area =

State Wildlife Area in Wisconsin

- Fish Lake State Wildlife Area
- IUCN category V (protected landscape/seascape)
- Location within Wisconsin Location within the United States
- Location: Burnett County, Wisconsin
- Nearest city: Grantsburg, WI
- Coordinates: 45°42′44″N 92°44′15″W
- Area: 13,649 acres (55.24 km^{2})
- Established: 1946
- Governing body: Wisconsin Department of Natural Resources

The Fish Lake Wildlife Area(FLWA) is a 13,649 acres (5,524 ha) tract of protected land located in Burnett County, Wisconsin, managed by the Wisconsin Department of Natural Resources (WDNR). Lands to be included in the wildlife area were first purchased in 1945 with the goal of restoring the conditions of the general area to what was observed in 1850, right before the first human settlements reached the area. The FLWA is made up of three separate areas, the 13,609 acres (5,507 ha) Fish Lake Habitat Management Area, the 40 acres (16 ha) Fish Lake Pines State Natural Area and the Grettum Flowage Wildlife Refuge zone.

== Fish Lake ==
The lake for which the wildlife area is named has an area of 330.09 acres (133.58 ha) and a maximum depth of 29 feet (8.8 m). The lake is noted for being exceptionally clear in both the east and west basin, with water clarity, perception, and color all receiving the best possible grades. Boat access to the lake is provided via a boat landing off of Pine Knoll Lane.

== Land cover ==
The first portion of land that was labelled as part of the FLWA had an area of 3,277 acres (1,326 ha) and was seized as tax-delinquent land. The FLWA was included in the Glacial Lake Grantsburg property complex, which also includes the Amsterdam Sloughs Wildlife Area and the Crex Meadows Wildlife Area, and as such was subject to the long range goal of all three units being managed for waterfowl.

In 1975 the first master plan was approved for the wildlife area, which now had an area of 13,240 acres (5,360 ha), excluding the 799 acres (323 ha) of private land that was considered within the boundaries of the wildlife area.

1975 Cover Type Acreage
Cover type	Acres	Percentage cover
Aspen and white birch	1,136	8%
Firebreaks	248	2%
Grass and upland brush	1,385	10%
Grass marsh	6,301	48%
Oak	1,684	12%
Open water	478	4%
Pine	1,940	15%
Swamp hardwoods	148	1%
Total Acreage	13,240	100%

Current Cover Type Acreage
Current cover type	Acres	Percentage Cover
Aspen	981	7%
Developed	10	<1%
Field	100	<1%
Grassland	1,063	8%
Non-forested wetland	6,080	45%
Oak	3,333	25%
Swamp conifer	10	<1%
Swamp hardwood	40	<1%
Upland conifer	639	5%
Upland hardwood	111	<1%
Water	1,242	9%
Total Acreage	13,609	100%

== Flora and Fauna ==
There are several different types of trees residing in the Wildlife Area, the most prominent being oak, maple, hemlock, and red pine. In addition to the varied flora, in both Swan Lake and the surrounding marshland, musky, Northern pike, largemouth bass, walleye and northern pike are commonly found. Besides sea dwelling fauna, black tern, turkey and shorebirds have been known to frequent the area.

== See also ==
- Amsterdam Sloughs Wildlife Area
- Crex Meadows Wildlife Area
