= Amsterdam Sloughs Wildlife Area =

State Wildlife Area in Burnett County, Wisconsin

- IUCN category V (protected landscape/seascape)
- Location within Wisconsin Location within the United States
- Location: Burnett County, Wisconsin U.S.
- Nearest city: Siren, Wisconsin
- Coordinates: 45°49′19″N 92°25′50″W
- Area: 5,052 acres (20.44 km^{2})
- Established: 1956
- Governing body: Wisconsin Department of Natural Resources

The Amsterdam Sloughs Wildlife Area is a 5,052-acre (2,044 ha) tract of protected land located in Burnett County, Wisconsin, managed by the Wisconsin Department of Natural Resources (WDNR). The Amsterdam Sloughs Wildlife Area is one of three such wildlife areas within the bounds of the Glacial Lake Grantsburg project, the others being Crex Meadows and Fish Lake.

== Barrens and wetlands ==
Over half of the Amsterdam Sloughs Wildlife Area is covered by either barrens or wetlands, with this type of land cover being the main reason for conservation efforts in the general area.

Barrens and Wetlands Cover Type Acreage
Cover Type	Acres	Percentage cover
Aspen	697	17%
Developed	15	<1%
Grassland	483	12%
Lowland shrub	100	2%
Non-forested wetland	1,789	43%
Oak	679	16%
Swamp conifer	58	1%
Swamp hardwood	9	<1%
Upland conifer	42	1%
Upland hardwood	65	1%
Water	262	6%
Total acreage	4,199	100%

== Flora and fauna ==
There are several different types of trees residing in the wildlife area, the most prominent being oak, maple, hemlock, and red pine. In addition to the varied flora, in both Swan Lake and the surrounding marshland, musky, Northern pike, largemouth bass, walleye and northern pike are commonly found. Besides sea-dwelling fauna, black tern, turkey and shorebirds have been known to frequent the area.

== Blomberg Lake and woods ==
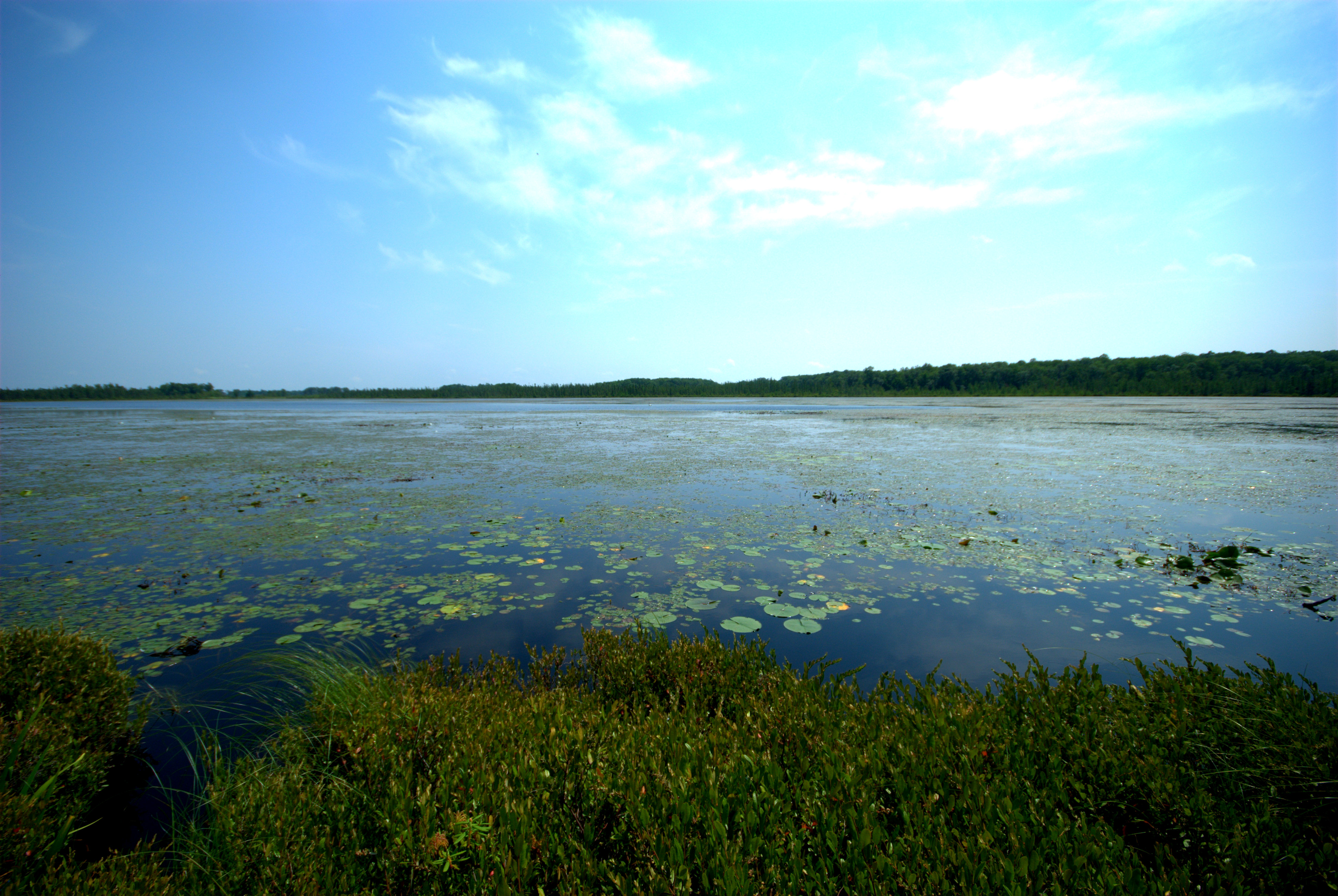
Blomberg Lake

The Blomberg Lake and Woods State Natural Area is a 966-acre (391 ha) state natural area located within the Amsterdam Sloughs Wildlife Area. The natural area includes Blomberg Lake, a 68-acre (28 ha) bog lake, with the other 898 acres (363 ha) being made up mainly of rich forested land.
