= Como Park Zoo and Conservatory =

Zoo and conservatory in Saint Paul, Minnesota, United States

Como Park Zoo and Marjorie McNeely Conservatory
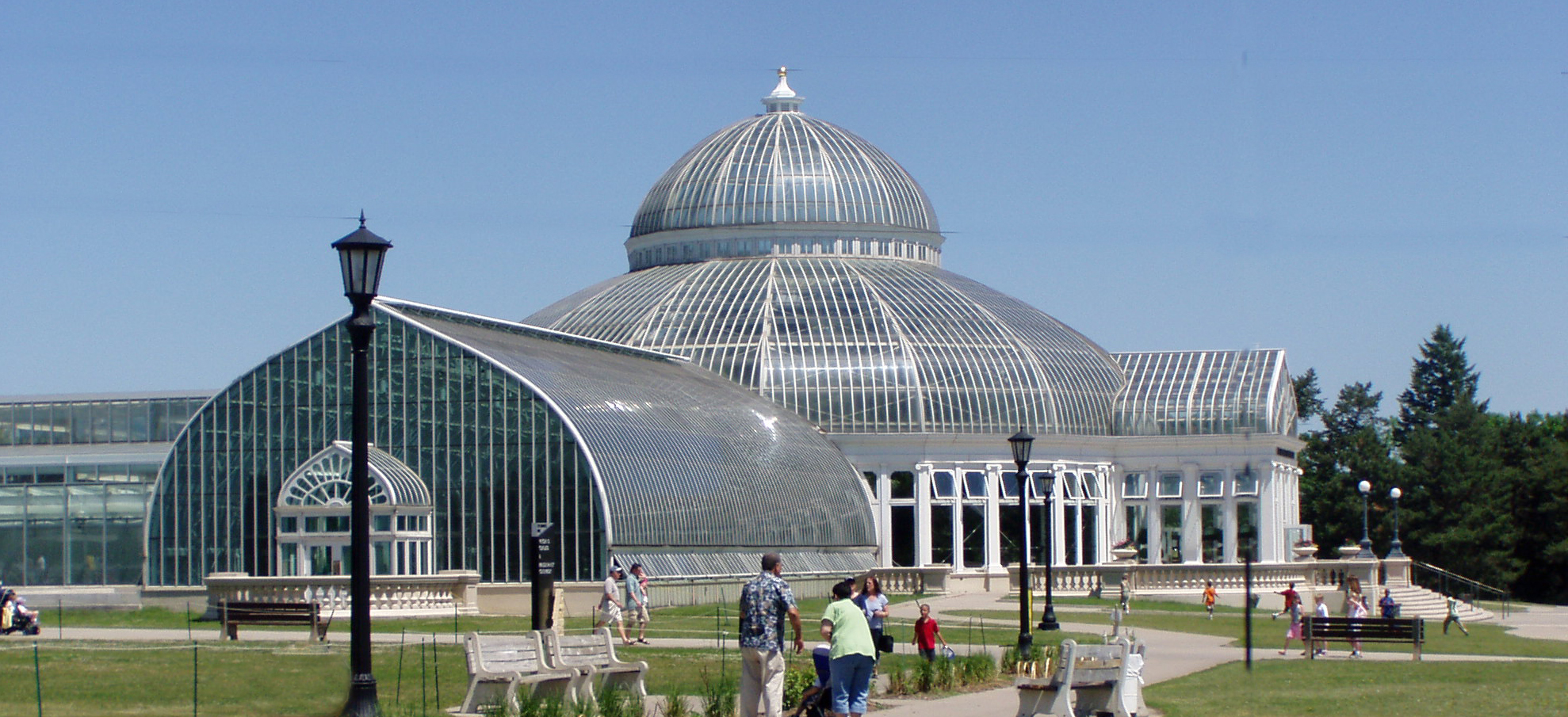
- The Marjorie McNeely Conservatory at Como Park
- Interactive map of Como Park Zoo and Marjorie McNeely Conservatory
- Type: Urban park
- Location: Saint Paul, Minnesota
- Coordinates: 44°58′53″N 93°09′03″W
- Area: 759 acres (307 ha)
- Created: 1873
- Visitors: 1.9 million
- Status: Open all year
- Public transit: Metro Transit
- Website: https://comozooconservatory.org

The Como Park Zoo and Marjorie McNeely Conservatory (also known as the Como Zoo and Conservatory) are located in Como Park at 1225 Estabrook Drive in Saint Paul, Minnesota. The park, zoo and conservatory are owned by the City of Saint Paul and are a division of Saint Paul Parks and Recreation. Its attractions include a zoo, a conservatory, an amusement park, a carousel, Lake Como, a golf course, a pool and more. The park receives more than 1.9 million visitors annually. Como Park is a free attraction, and while no admission fee is charged for the zoo or conservatory, voluntary donations of $8 per adult and $5 child are suggested.

== Como Park ==
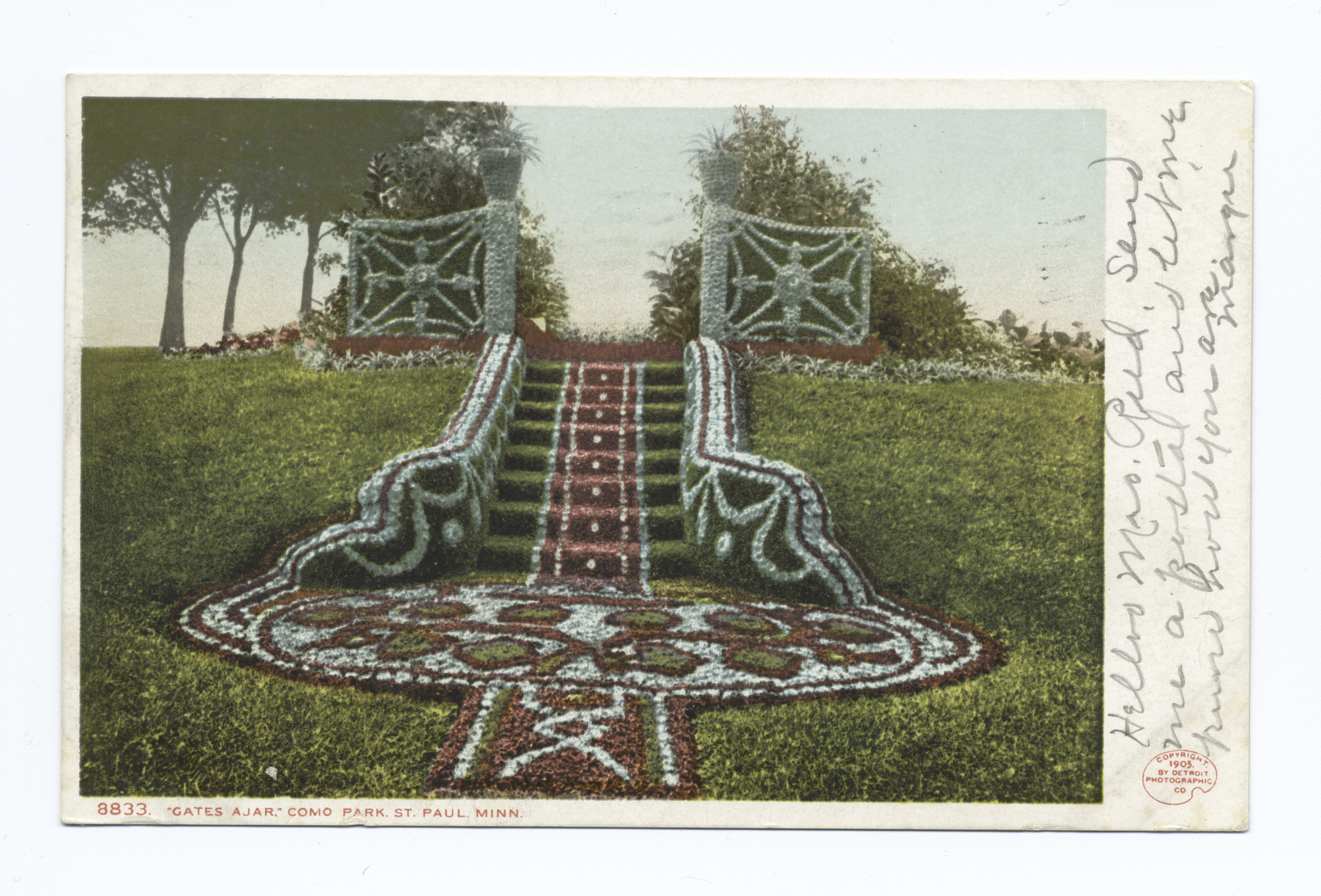
Como Park, c. 1900 (The Gates Ajar)

Como Lake and Park, St. Paul, Minnesota,

In 1873, the City of Saint Paul acquired 300 acres (120 ha) of land around Como Lake that would become a public park. Today the 384-acre (155 ha) park includes:

- 2.3 miles (3.7 km) of paved trails
- Athletic fields
- Como Golf Course - 18 hole, 70 par
- Como Lake
  - 1.67-mile (2.69 km) paved path around the lake
  - Fishing Pier
  - Lakeside Pavilion - home to Como Dockside Restaurant and Bar a New Orleans themed restaurant which hosts local live music in an outdoor band shell nightly in the summer.
  - Paddleboat, canoe, paddle boards, and family bike rentals
- Como Pool
- Como Town amusement park
- Picnic shelters
- Putt'er There Mini Golf
- Medallion

=== Art and historic structures ===
- Bridge No. L-5853 - Pedestrian bridge over former street car tracks, built in 1904 and engineered by William S. Hewett. It was added to the National Register of Historic Places in 1989. It is significant for being one of the oldest examples of a reinforced concrete bridge.
- Bridge No. 92247 - Lexington Avenue Bridge - Also built in 1904 and engineered by William S. Hewett, it was added to the National Register of Historic Places in 1989. It is significant for being one of the oldest examples of a reinforced concrete bridge and because it is wider than it is long.
- Cafesjian's Carousel - PTC #33 was built in 1914 by the Philadelphia Toboggan Company and was restored and saved from auction in 1988.
- Comfort Station - Prairie style restrooms located in the West Picnic Grounds that were completed in 1917 and restored in 1998.
- Constructing Friendship - A sculpture by Michael Sinesio created in 2006 as a part of the Minnesota Rocks! International Stone Carving Symposium. It is located at the west entrance to the park.
- Frog Pond - Completed in 1910, the overlook has a pergola that was donated in 1929. The granite frog, from which the pond gets its name, is from 1923.
- Gates Ajar - Originally installed in 1894. The iron gates were installed on the structure sometime later during the depression by Chief City Blacksmith, Walter Cronk. Being refurbished in 2007.
- Global Harmony Labyrinth - Dedicated in 2005, it celebrates the Sister City relationship between Saint Paul and Nagasaki, Japan. (read about the construction of the labyrinth)
- Granite Frog- Located in the middle of Frog Pond directly south of the conservatory, last remaining component of the original Japanese garden.
- Hamms Memorial Waterfall
- Henrik Ibsen - Bust of Norwegian playwright Henrik Ibsen, created by Norwegian-born artist Jacob Fjelde and given to the city in 1907 by a Norwegian fraternal organization. The bust was stolen in 1982 and replaced in the late 1990s. ("Oh, Henrik!")
- Historic Street Car Station - A station for the Twin City Rapid Transit Company and the Como-Harriet line.
- Joyce Kilmer Memorial Fireplace - The large stone fireplace was erected in 1936 in memory of poet Joyce Kilmer. For years, the fireplace was in a state of disrepair, but in 2011 it was refurbished and rededicated.
- Lakeside Pavilion - The current building was constructed in 1992 as an exact replica of the original 1905 building.
- Lily Pond - Originally built in 1895 and known as the Aquarium, the pond featured exotic lily pads. While the lily pads returned to Como Park at the conservatory in 2005, the original pond has been dry and unused for some time.
- Mannheimer Memorial - Designed in 1905-1906 by Cass Gilbert, who also designed the Minnesota State Capitol building.
- Paisley Perch - Another Minnesota Rocks! sculpture created in 2006, this bench-shaped creation is by Peter Morales. It is located at the southern corner of the park off Lexington Avenue, next to the ball fields.
- Points of Compass - A life-size sundial designed and constructed by Superintendent of Parks George Nason in the 1930s.
- Schiller Statue - Bronze figure of Johann von Schiller with a granite base by artist Ignatium Taschner, dedicated in 1907.
- Schiffman Fountain
- Submariner's Memorial - Dedicated in 1965 as a memorial to the lost crew of the USS Swordfish.

=== Saint Paul Winter Carnival ===
In 1939, Lake Como hosted the Winter Carnival Ice Palace and the Winter Carnival Medallion has been hidden in Como Park eight times (1956, 1965, 1980, 1990, 1997, 2001, 2003, and 2014).

== Como Zoo ==
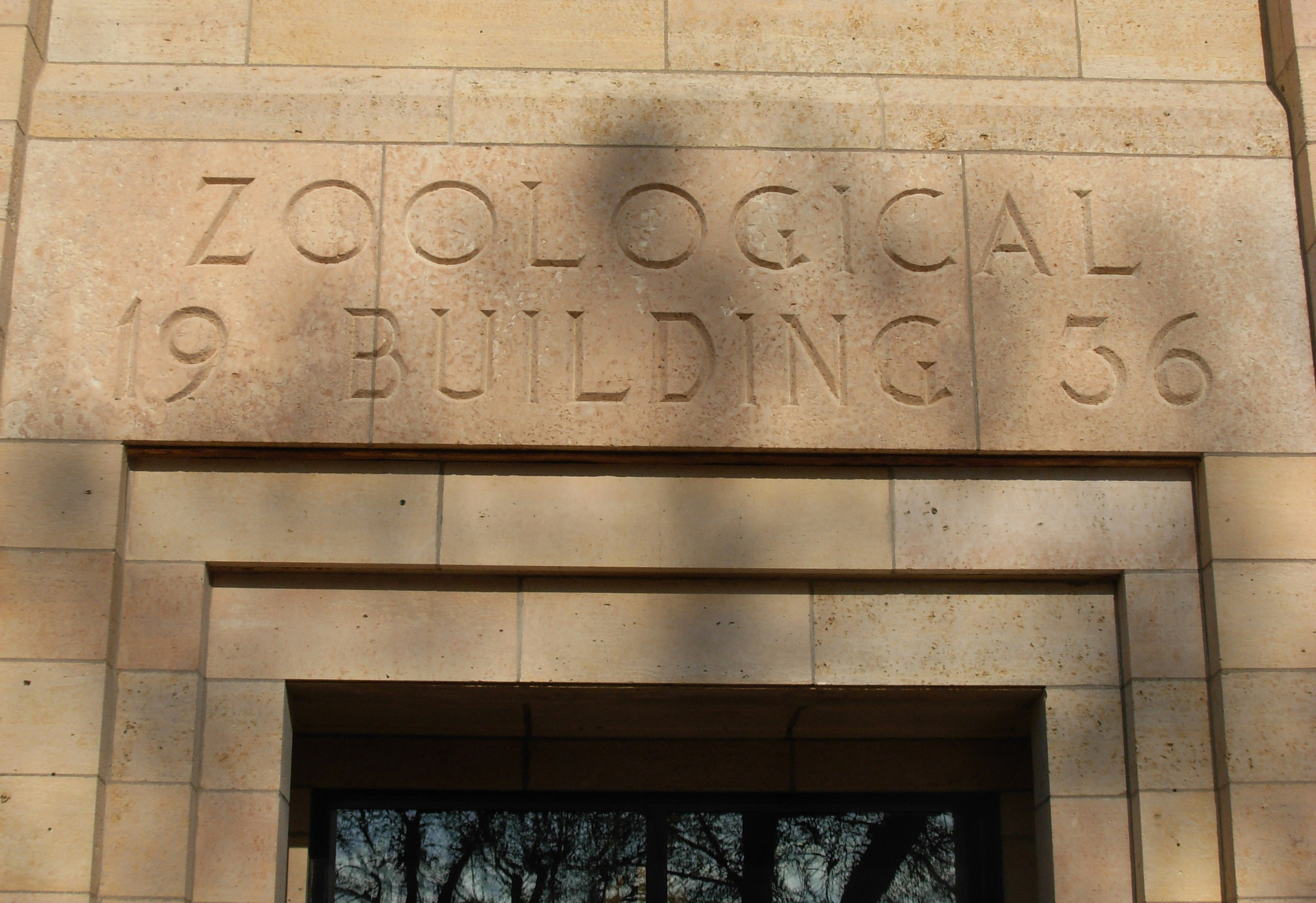
1936 Zoological Building

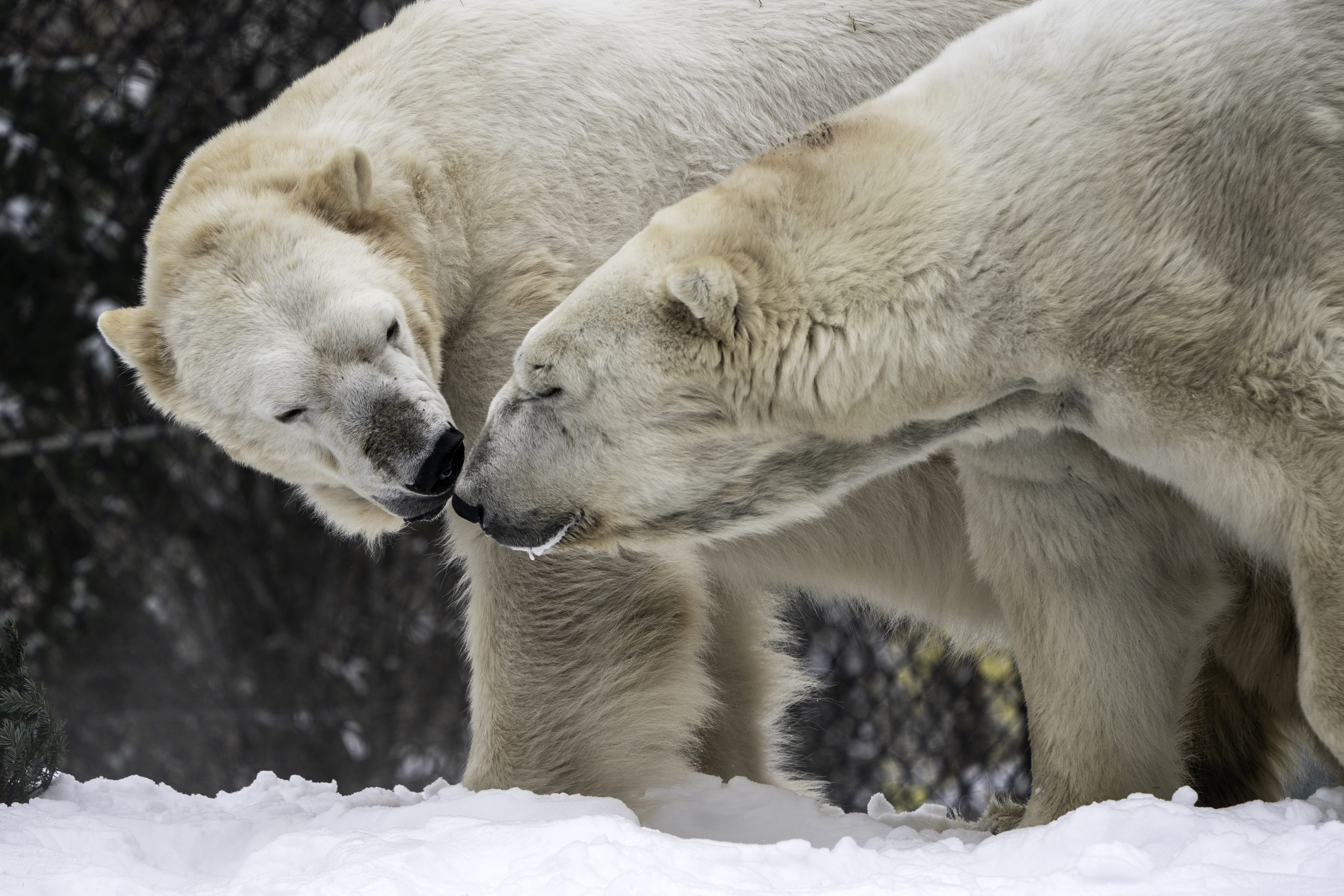
Polar Bears, Buzz and Neil in 2020, part of the Polar Bear Odyssey exhibit

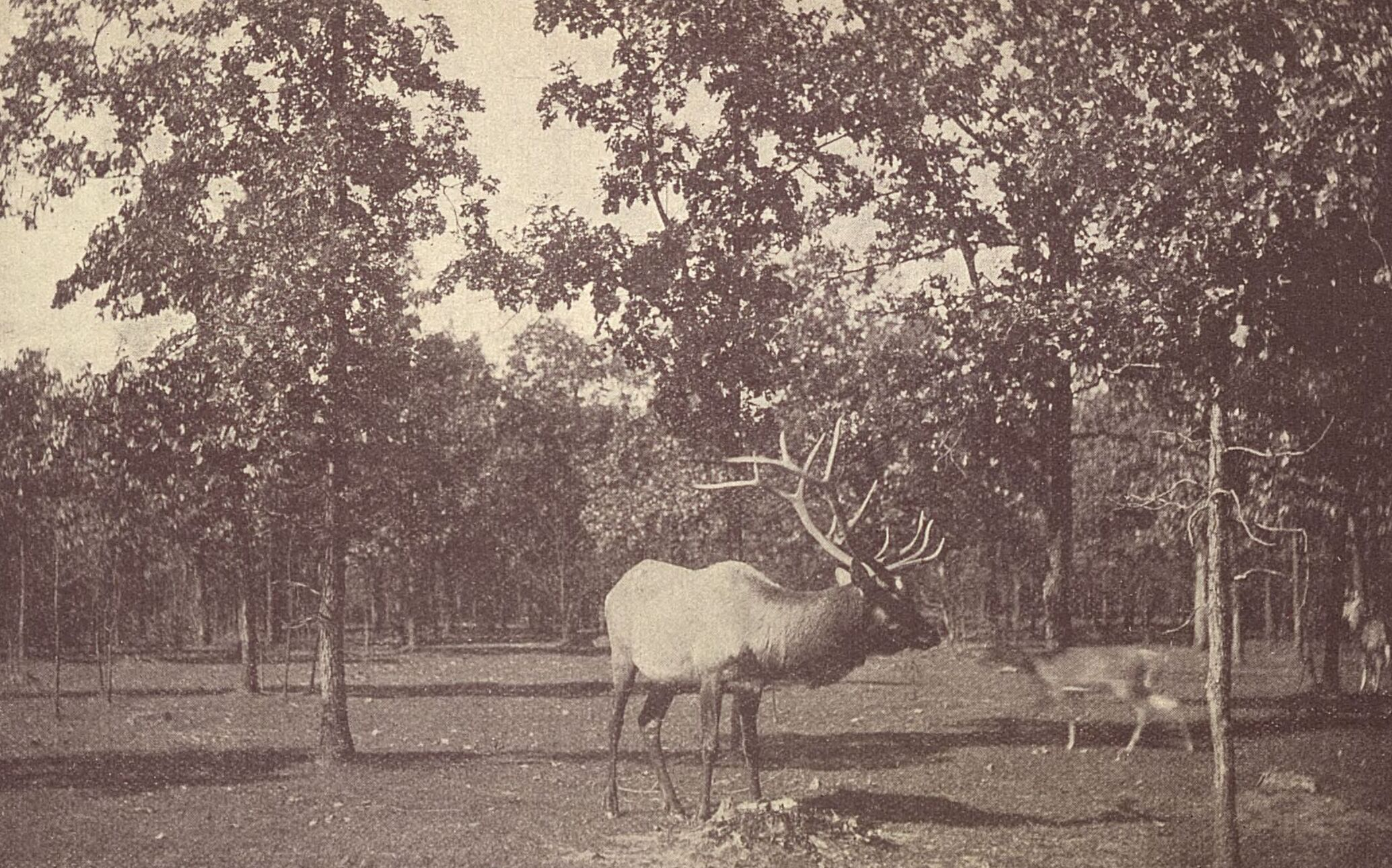
Elk at the zoo, ca. 1901

The first zoo in Saint Paul was started when in 1897, the city of St. Paul received a gift of three deer. Additional animals followed, when more room was needed to house the animals they were moved to facilities at Como Park. Como Zoo continued to grow through donations of animals and money.

The Art Deco Zoological Building was designed in 1936 by Charles Bassford as part of the federally funded Works Progress Administration. Other WPA structures were completed in the 1930s, including Monkey Island, barn and bear grotto.

In the 1980s several new exhibits were added as part of a major renovation project, including the Large Cat exhibit (1980), Aquatic Animal Building and conversion of Monkey Island to Seal Island (1982), the Primate Facility (1985), the Land and Water Bird exhibit (1986) and the African Hoofed Stock Facility (1987).

=== Art at Como Zoo ===
- Don the Gorilla - Bronze and stone statue of a popular gorilla named Don donated by artist Betty Sievert in 1982. Located outside the primate house.
- Giraffes - Fiberglass giraffes created by Third Street Studios and donated in memory of Sandra Kay Bjick in 1994. Located near the giraffe exhibit.
- Polar Bears - Fiberglass polar bears created by Third Street Studios. Located near the polar bear exhibit.
- Sparky - Fiberglass sculpture of 'Sparky' the sea lion who performs entertaining shows at Como Zoo. Created by Third Street Studios in 1997 in celebration of the zoo's centennial. Located near the Sparky Amphitheater.
- Toby the Tortoise - Bronze sculpture of the popular tortoise named Toby. Create by the artist Tischler. Located in front of the Zoological building in the Como Park Zoo Donor Plaza.
- Penguins - Fiberglass sculpture of penguins.
- Earth Day Mural - Created by Teresa Cox on April 22, 2000, with help from zoo visitors.
- Family - A set of three abstract, wire-frame sculptures created by Russell Erickson in 1978. The sculpture stood in front of the FDA building in Minneapolis until 2004 when the building was demolished and the sculpture eventually moved to the Como Zoo as a temporary measure. As of 2009 it is located in a grassy picnic area across from Como Harbour.

A new Polar bear exhibit was finished in 2010. The two twin Polar bear brothers (Buzz and Neil) returned from their temporary stay in Canada. The exhibit includes a shallow and deep pool plus a middle room. It also has a back room where the Polar bears can choose to stay in the AC. A new seal and sea lion exhibit with two pools was completed in 2021.

=== Casey the Gorilla ===
On May 13, 1994, Casey a 400-pound gorilla, scaled the wall of his enclosure and wandered free around the zoo for 45 minutes. Visitors were ushered to safety as zoo staff shot Casey with a tranquilizer and returned him to his enclosure. This resulted in the zoo building a temporary slanted wall around the enclosure to keep this from happening again. The zoo opened a new exhibit in 2013 called Gorilla Forest. Casey was moved to the Audubon Zoo in New Orleans.

== Marjorie McNeely Conservatory ==
- Como Park Conservatory
- U.S. National Register of Historic Places
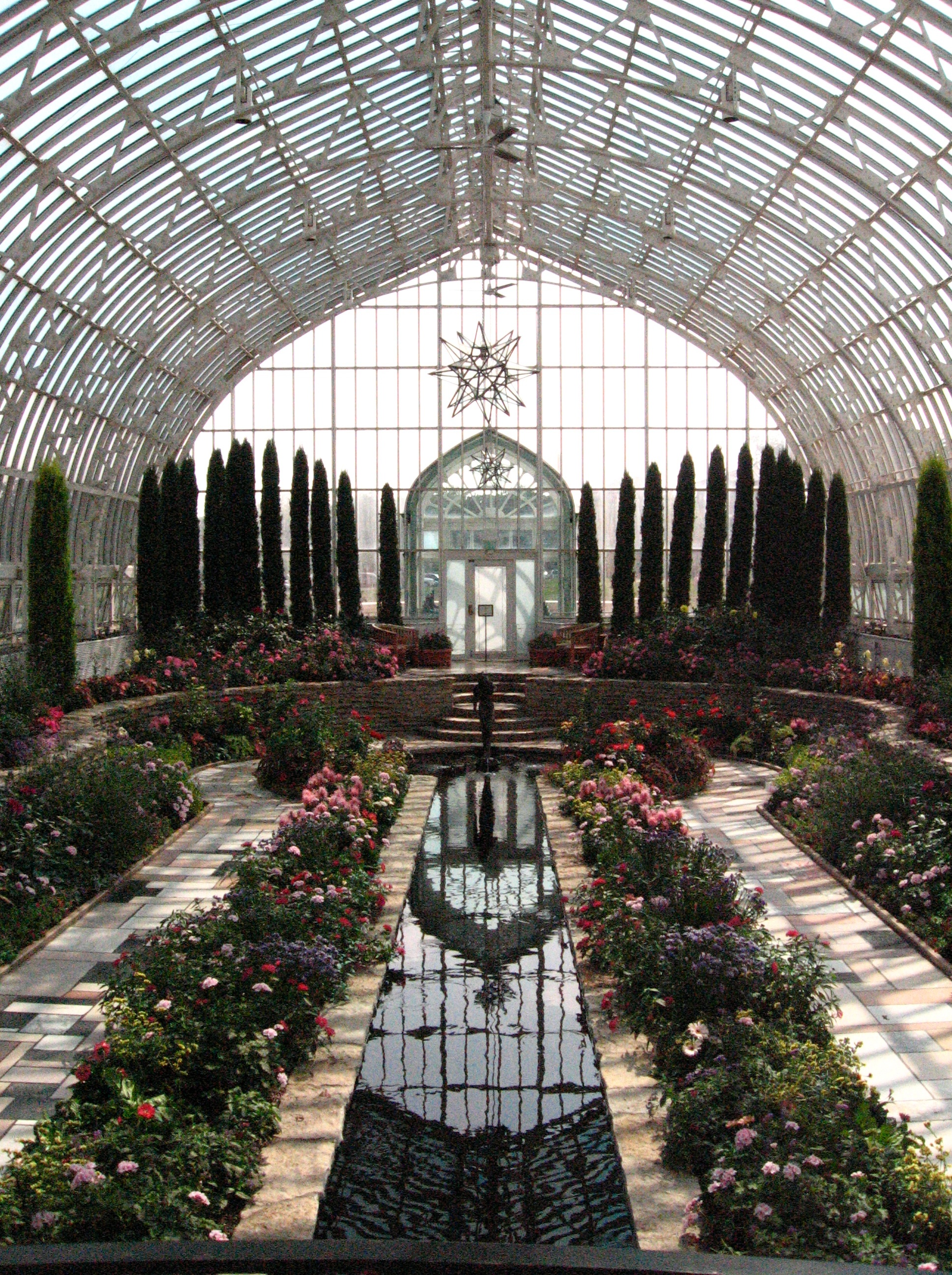
- The sunken garden in the Marjorie McNeely Conservatory
- Location: Como Park; St. Paul, Minnesota
- Built: 1913
- Architect: Frederick Nussbaumer
- NRHP reference No.: 74001033
- Added to NRHP: November 19, 1974

The 0.5-acre (2,000 m^{2}) Marjorie McNeely Conservatory was first opened to the public in November 1915. This facility is open to the public every day of the year. It includes the following gardens and galleries:

- The Ordway Gardens - features a Bonsai Gallery and native grass terrace.
- Enchanted and Excedra Garden - a butterfly garden that includes a mix of perennials and annuals grasses, flowers, and shrubs.
- Fern Room - features a wide array of tree ferns, Bird's-nest fern, Adiantum, and several others.
- Japanese Garden - sansui style, mountain and water landscape, a gift from Masami Matsuda, a prominent Japanese landscape architect, that represents friendship and peace between Saint Paul and its sister city Nagasaki, Japan.
- North Garden - useful plants such as aloe, bamboo, bananas, cacao, coffee, figs, macadamia, mahogany, manila hemp, manioc, papaya, etc.
- Orchid House (Horticultural Staff Only)
- Palm Dome (64' high and 100' in diameter) - more than 150 palm species, as well as a rotational display of orchids and bromeliads.
- Sunken Garden - features five seasonal flower shows a year.
- Tropical Encounters - A new exhibit (opened fall 2006) featuring animals and plants from Central and South America. This is a separate exhibit located in the Visitor Center.

The conservatory was added to the National Register of Historic Places in 1974.

=== Art at the Marjorie McNeely Conservatory ===
- Crest of the Wave - Bronze sculpture created in 1925 by artist Harriet Frishmuth. Located in the Palm Dome.
- Play Days - Bronze sculpture by artist Harriet Frishmuth. Located in the Sunken Garden.
- St. Francis of Assisi - Sculpture of the revered saint, Francis of Assisi.

== Gallery ==
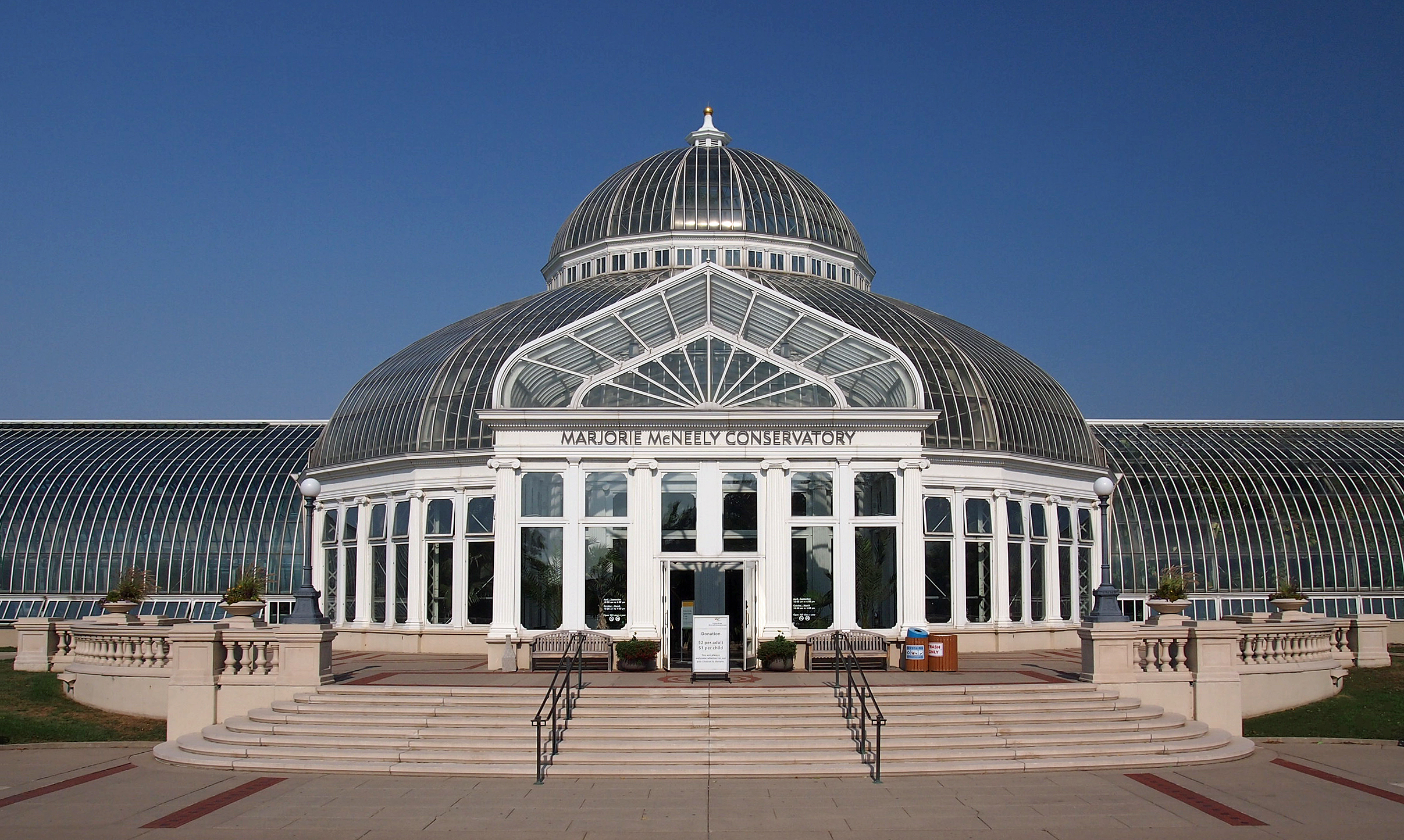
Entrance to the conservatory

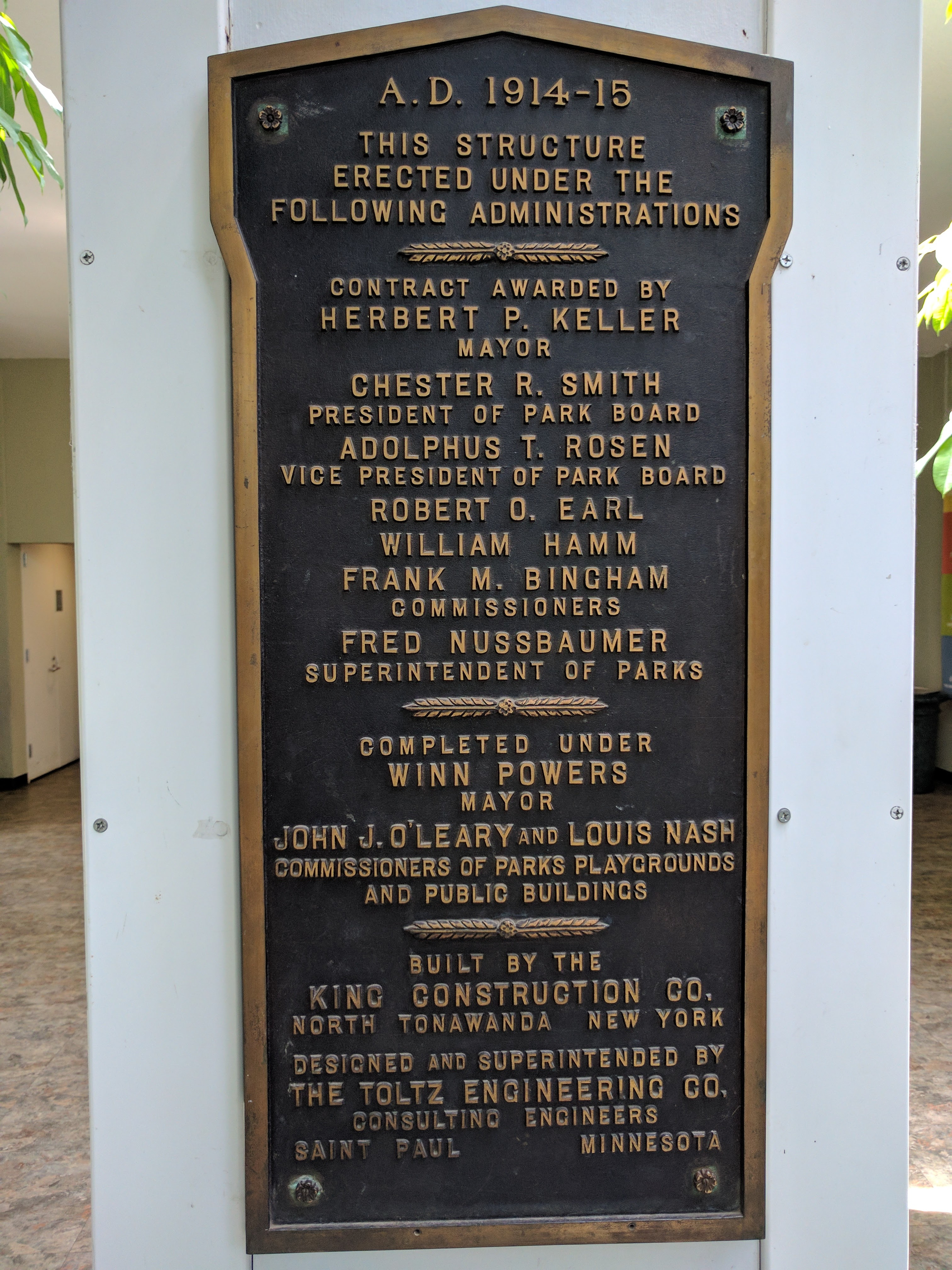
Building plaque

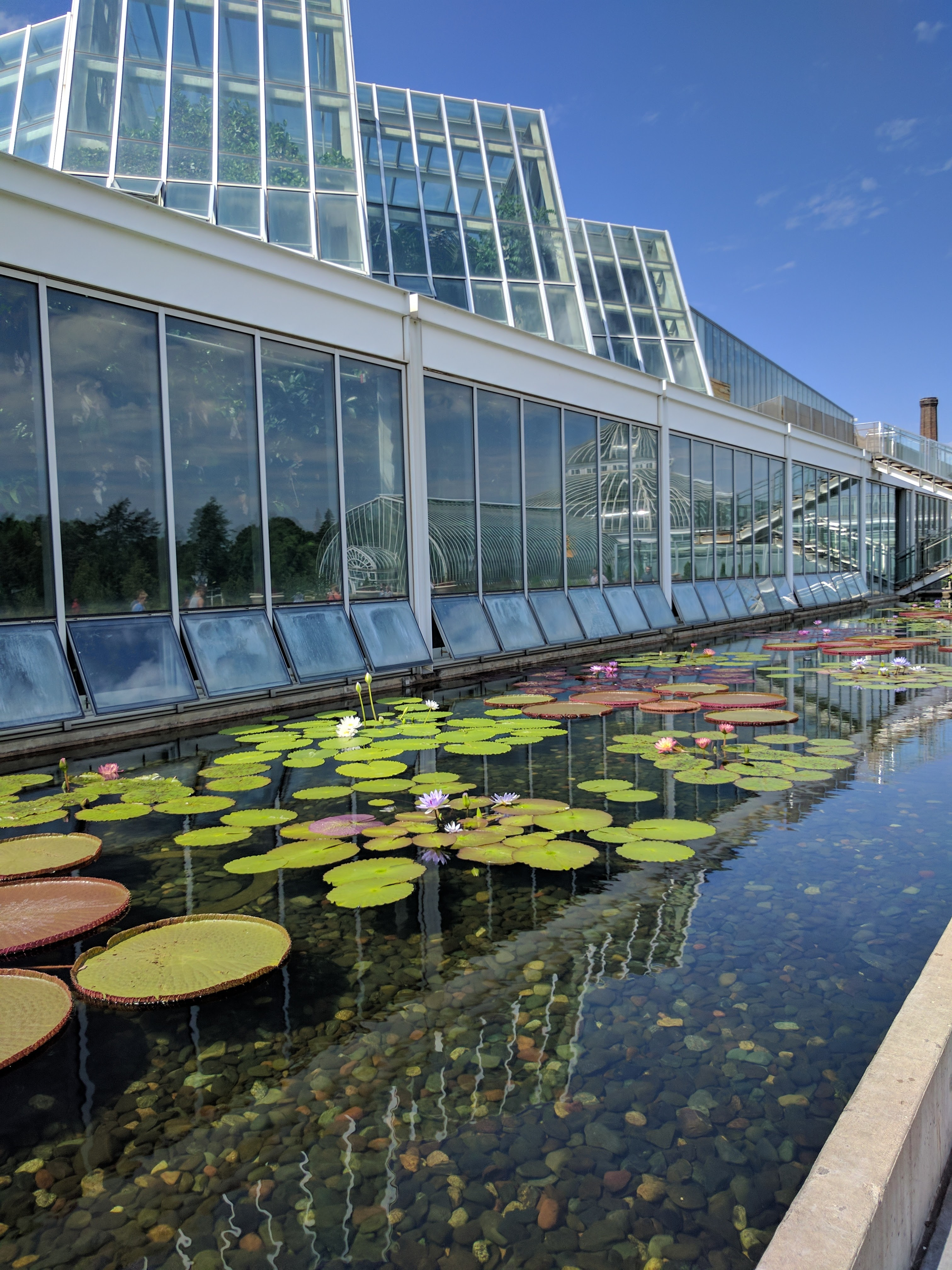
Pond outside the conservatory

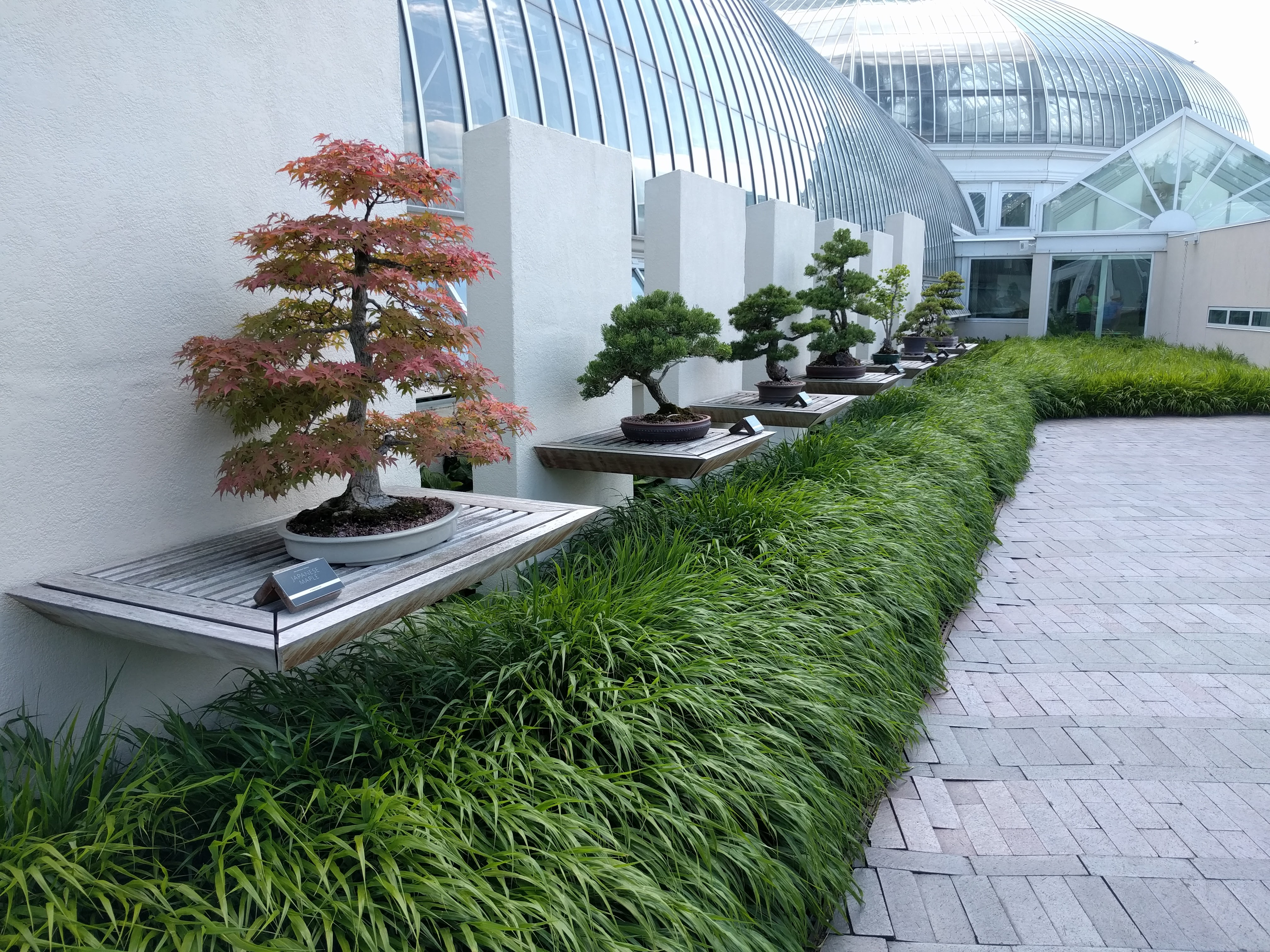
Bonsai trees on display

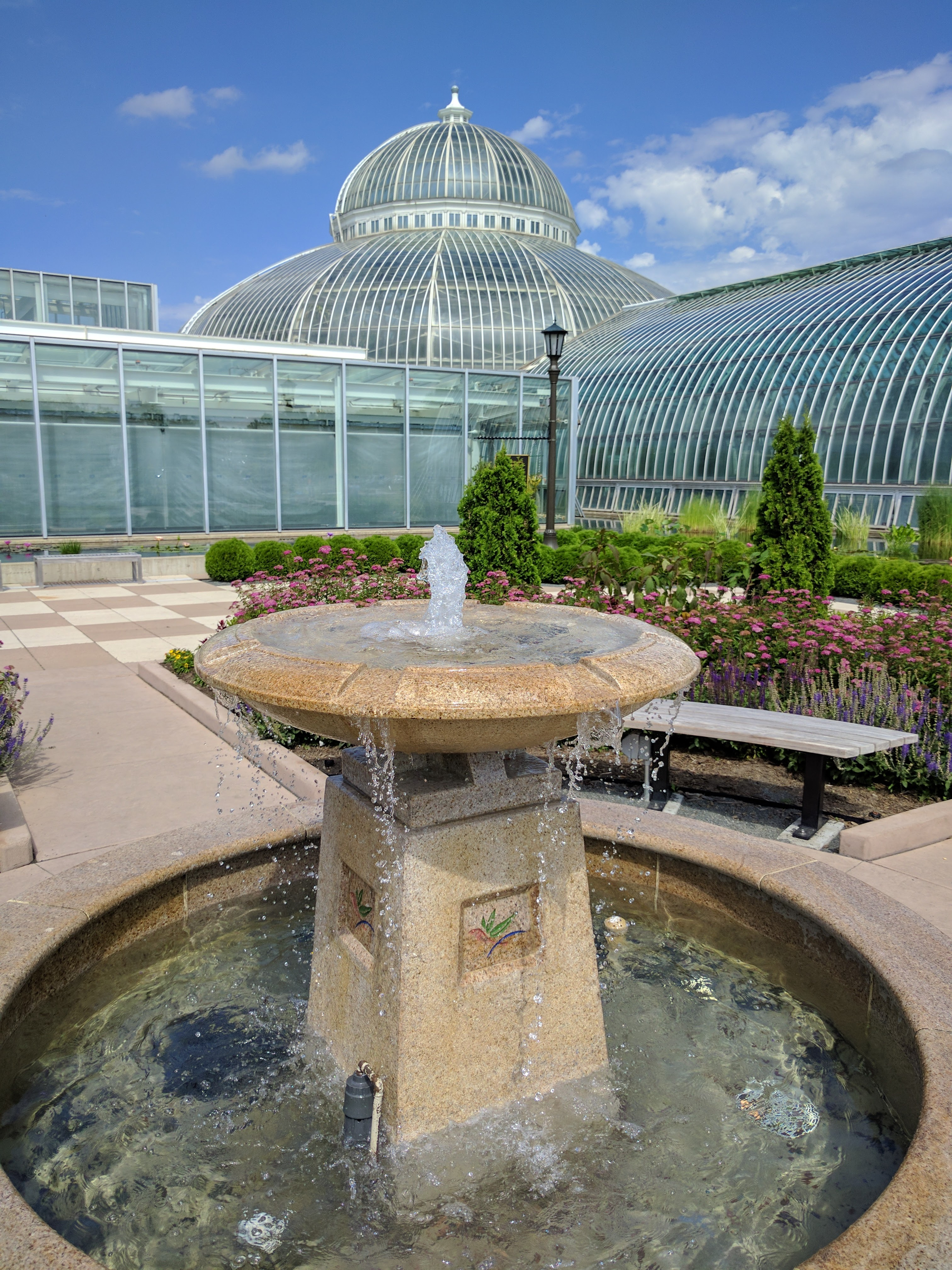
Fountain outside of the conservatory

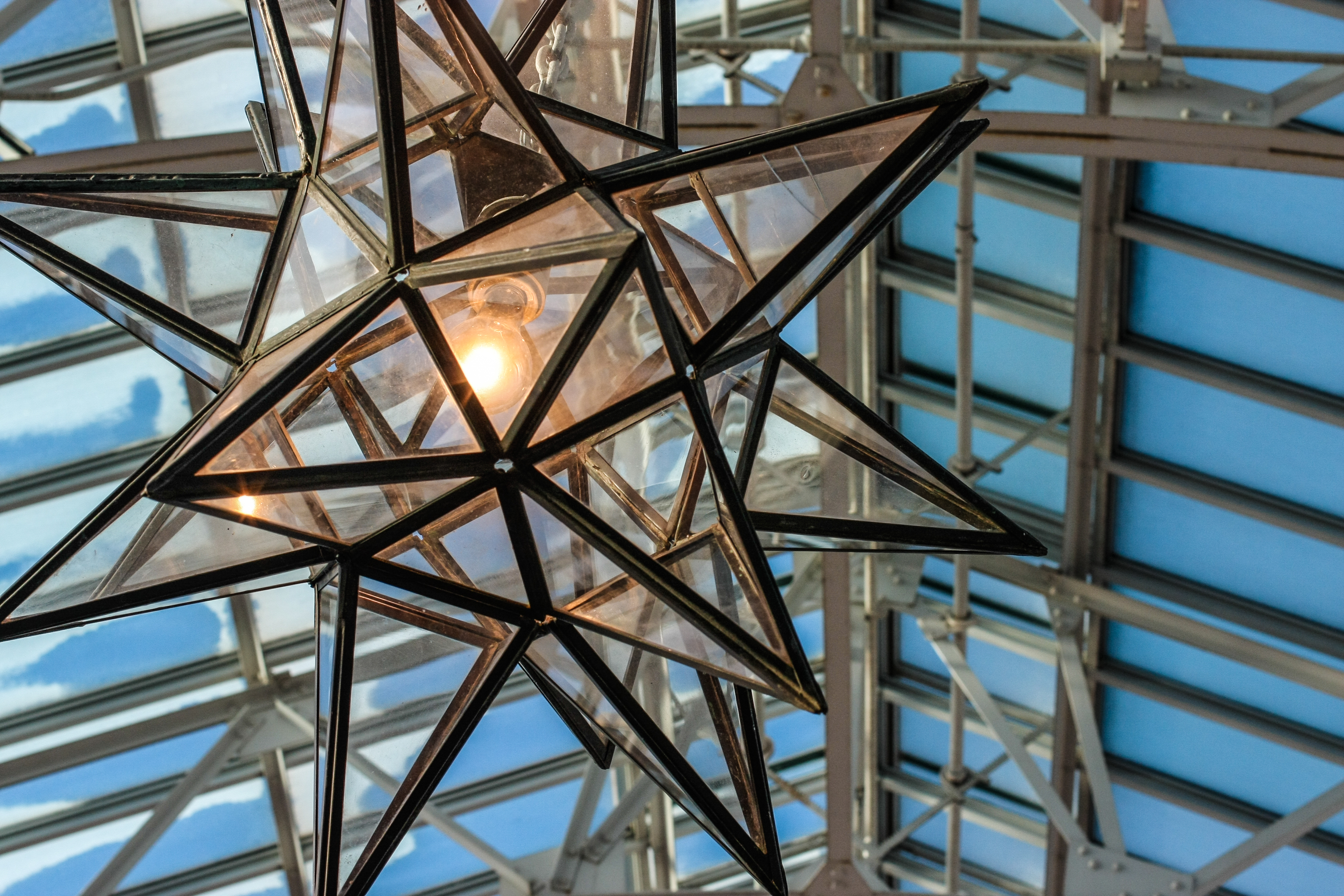
Close-up of the Como Conservatory Star inside the building

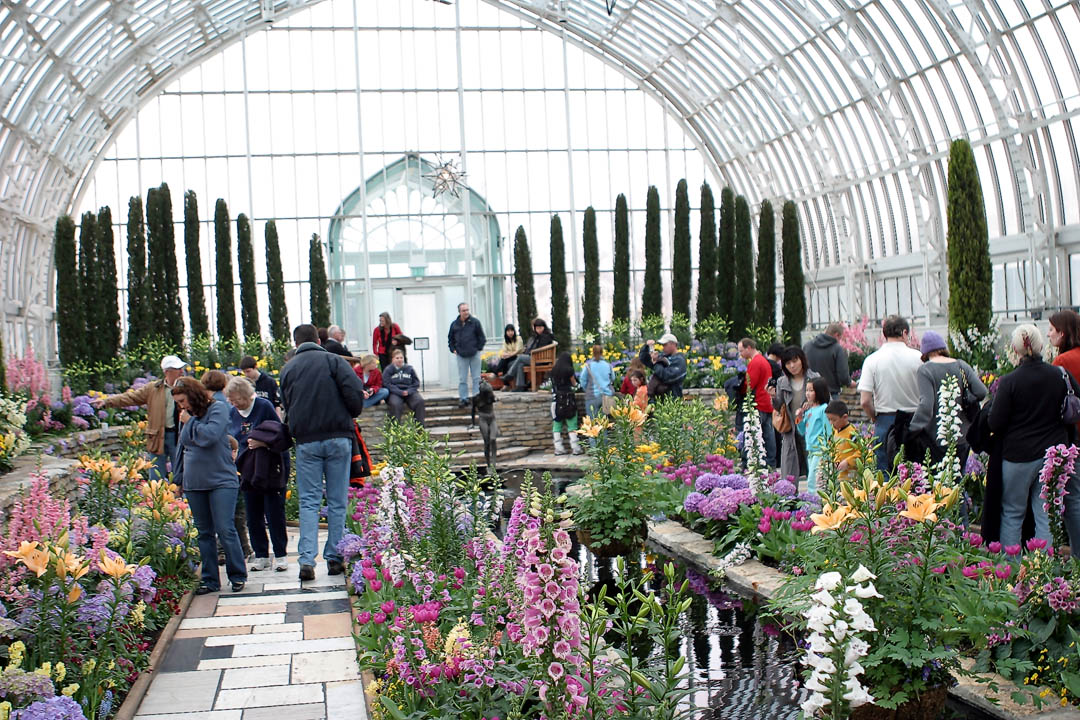
During the spring flower display at the Sunken Garden

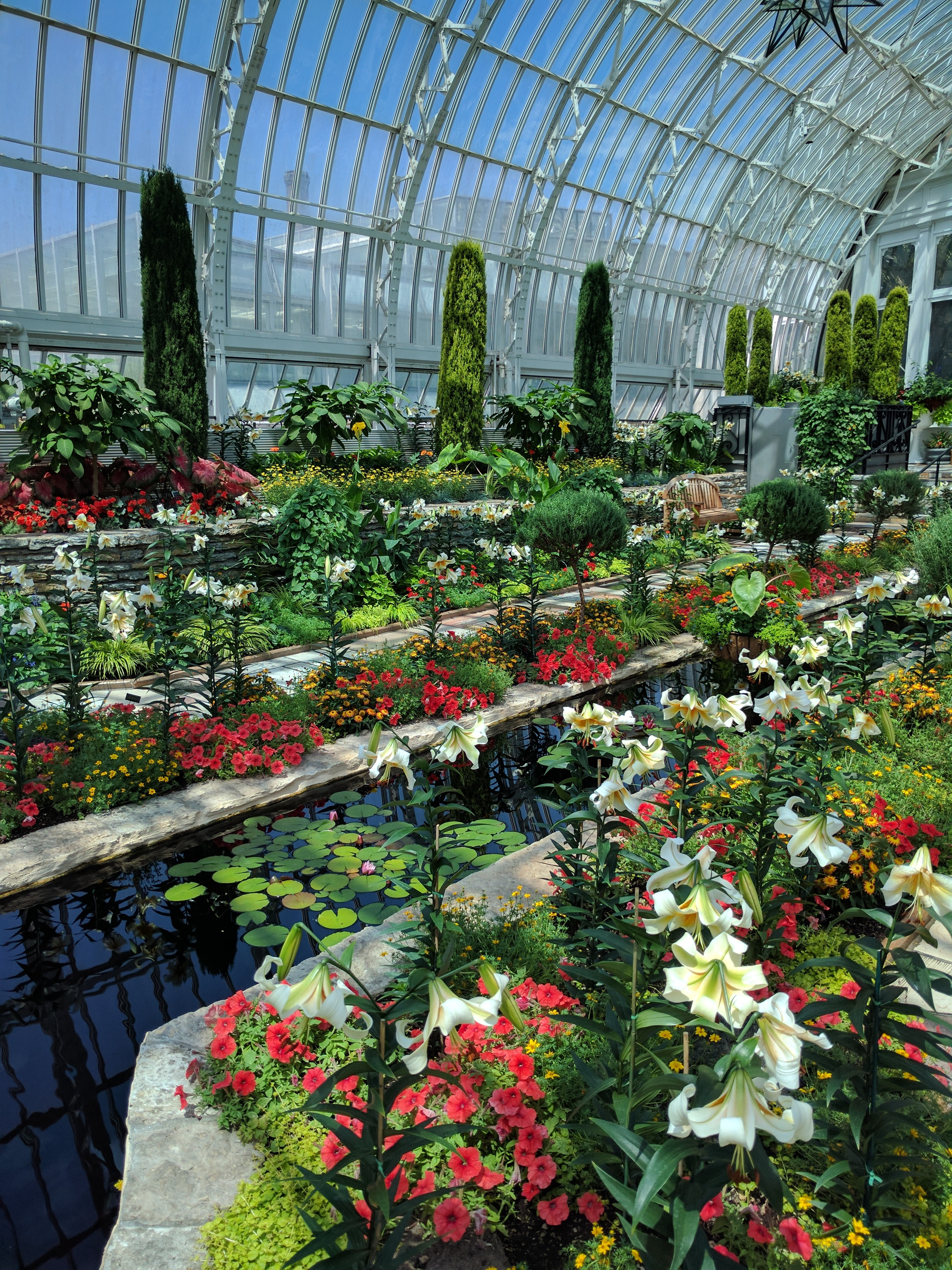
Close-up view of the Sunken Garden

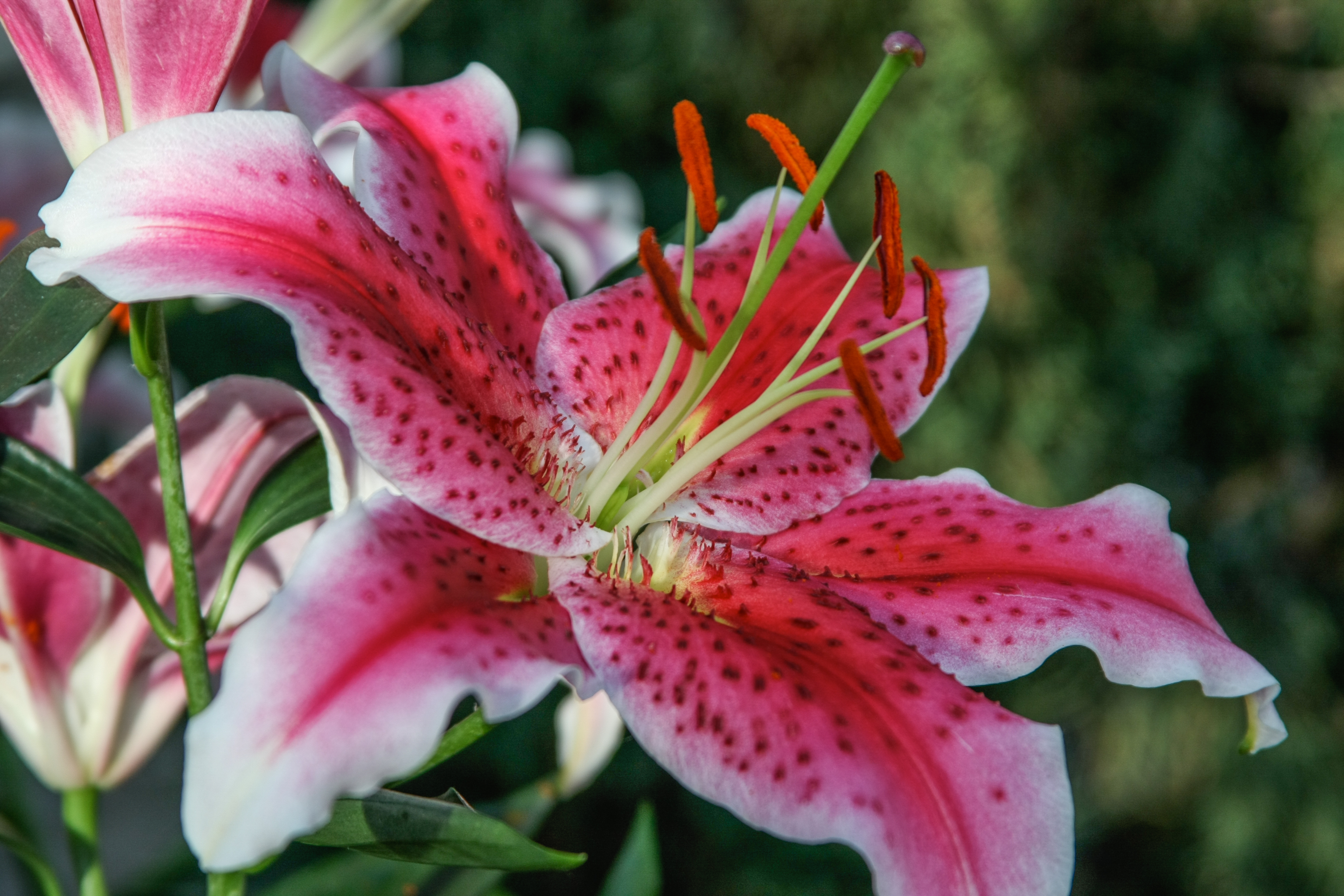
One of the many flowering plants.

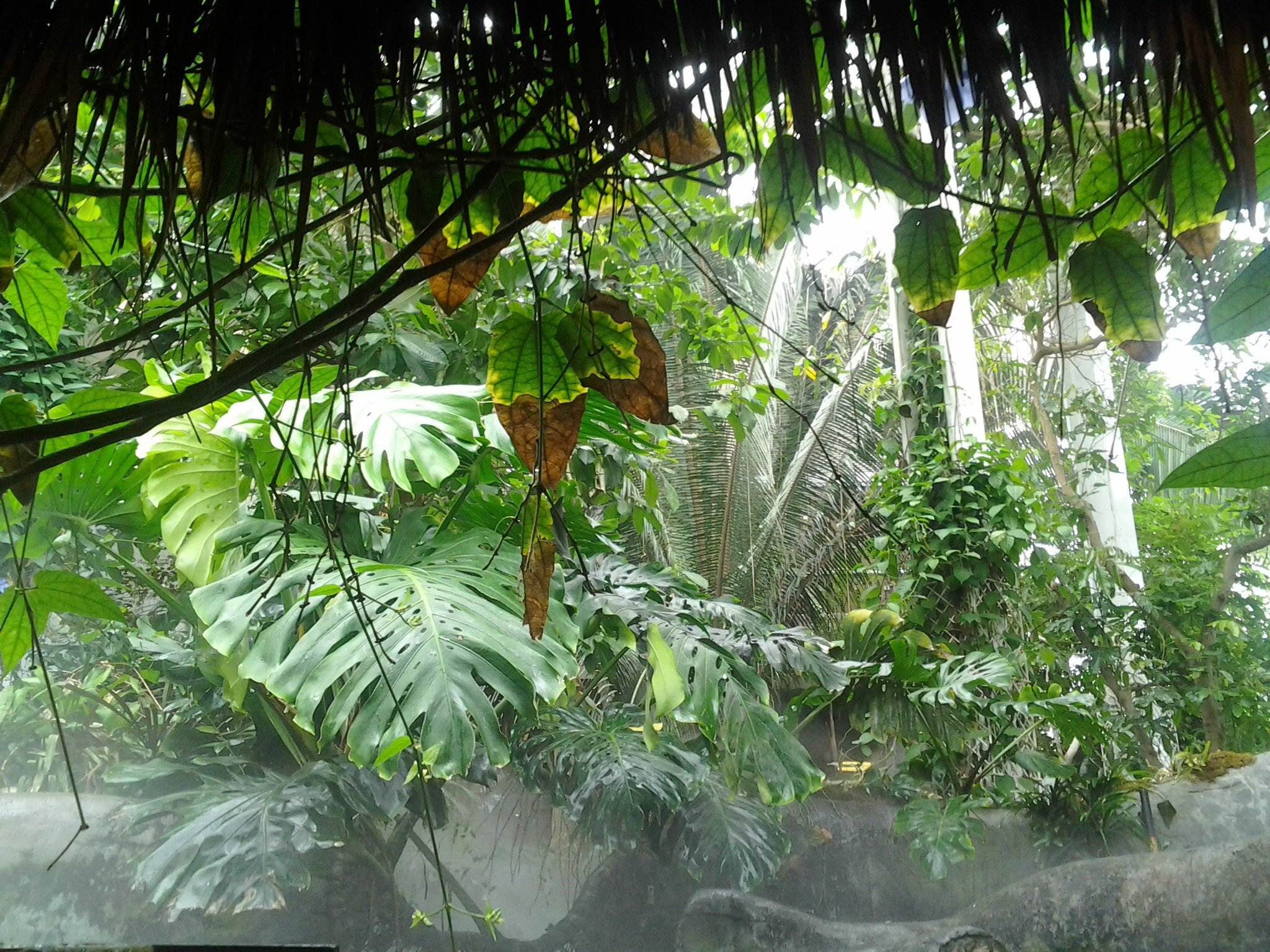
Inside the jungle area within the conservatory

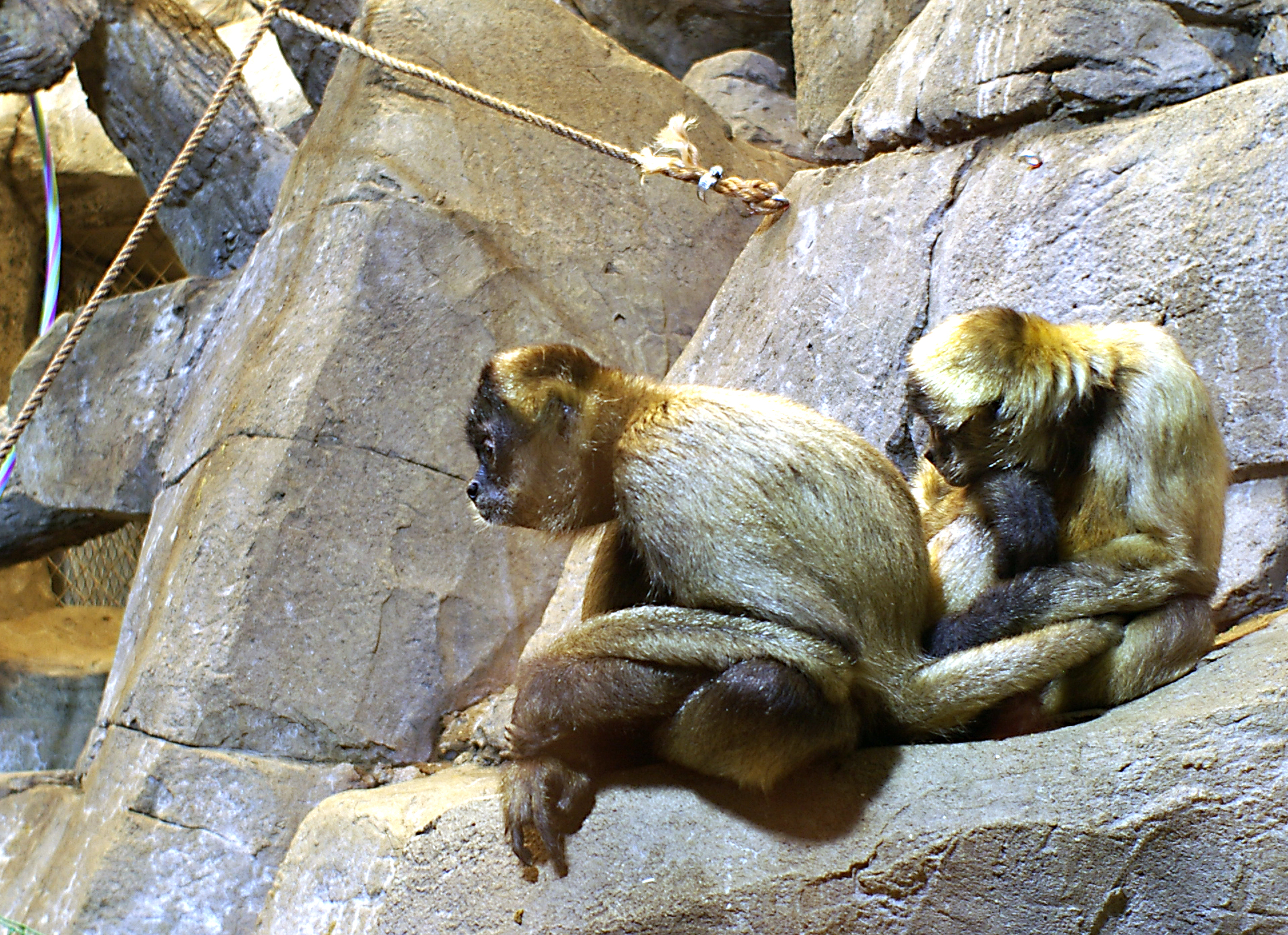
The conservatory is connected to the Como Zoo

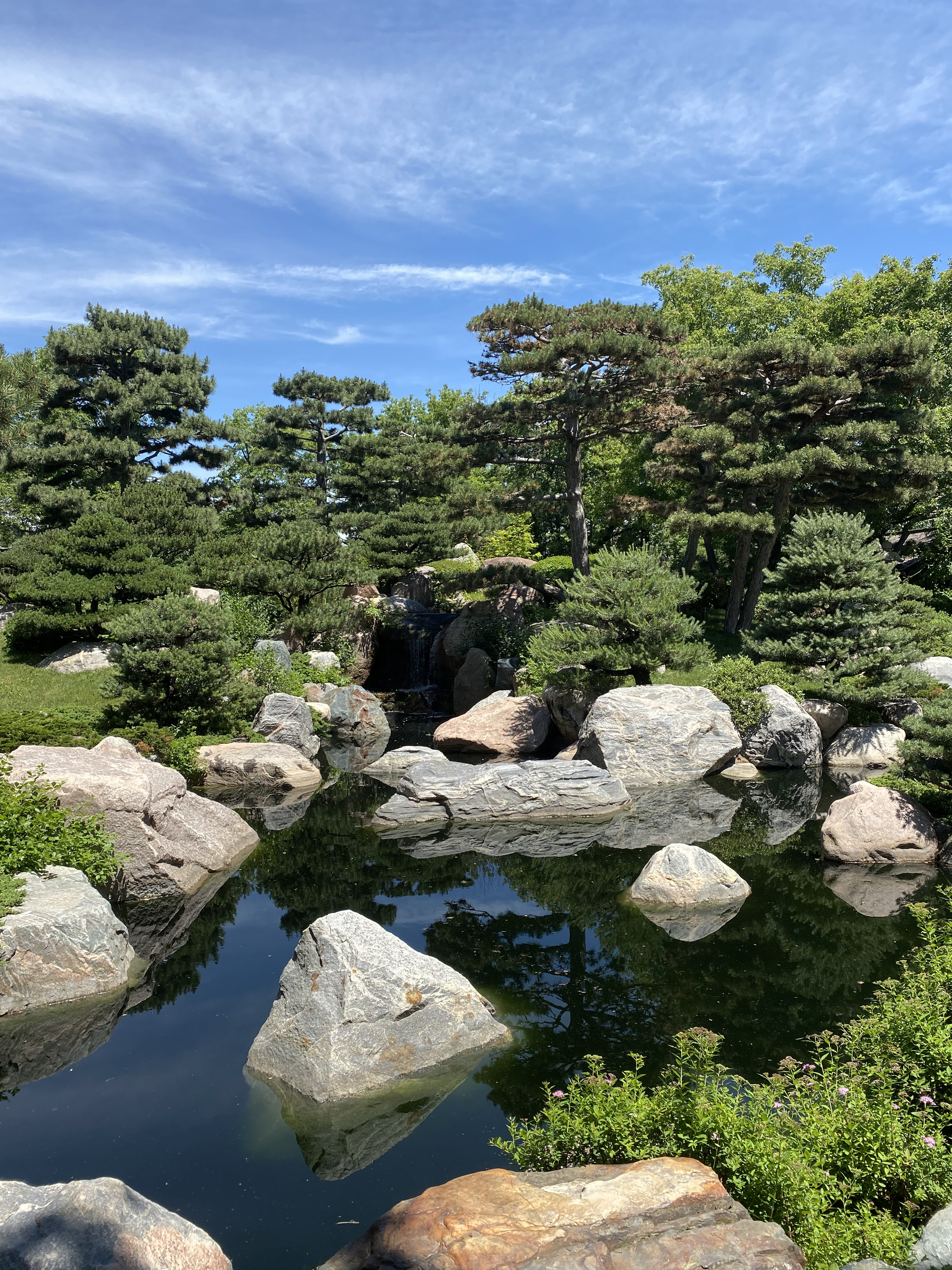
One area of the Japanese Garden at the Como Park Conservatory

== See also ==
- Como Zoo
- List of botanical gardens in the United States
