= Como Lake (Minnesota) =

Lake in Minnesota, United States

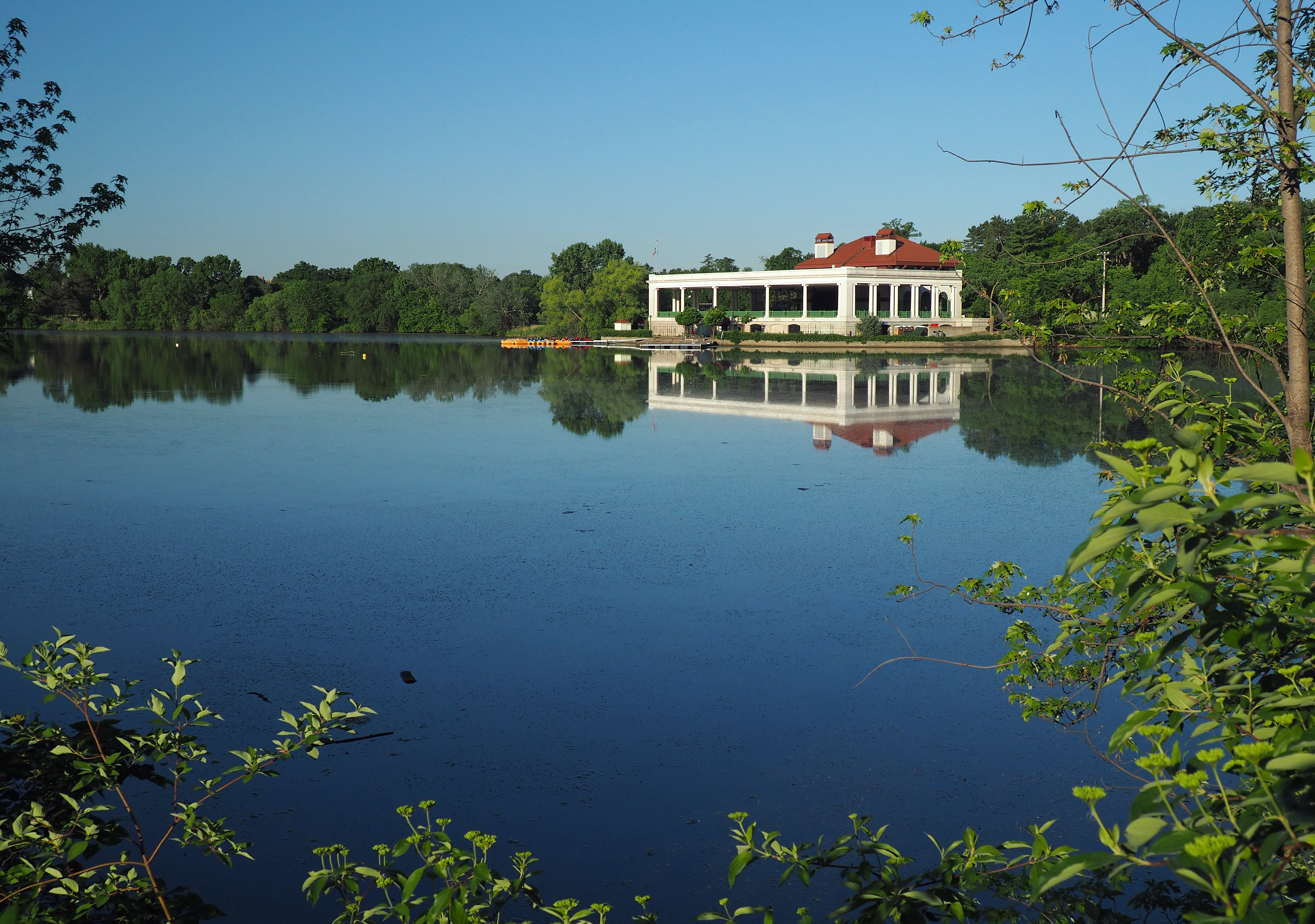
- Como Lake and Como Lakeside Pavilion

- Location within Minnesota
- Location: St. Paul, Minnesota
- Coordinates: 44°58′45″N 93°08′26″W
- Basin countries: United States
- Surface area: 71.3 acres (289,000 m^{2})
- Max. depth: 15.5 ft (4.7 m)
- Water volume: 468.8 acre-feet (578,300 m^{3})
- Shore length^{1}: 1.73 miles (2.78 km)
- References: https://www.dnr.state.mn.us/lakefind/lake.html?id=62005500
- ^{1} Shore length is not a well-defined measure.

Como Lake and Park, St. Paul, Minnesota,

Como Lake is a 70.5-acre (285,000 m^{2}) lake up to 15.5 feet (4.7 m) deep in St. Paul, Minnesota, United States. It, along with the neighboring Como Park, has been a recreation area for residents of the Twin Cities for more than a century. It was named in 1848 by local farmer Charles Perry. A pavilion sits on the west side of the lake, and plays host to theatrical performances and concerts during the warmer months. The park features a variety of attractions, including the Como Park Zoo and Conservatory and the Como Regional Park Pool.

== Environmental history ==
Como Lake was originally mostly a wetland with some open water but was expanded and deepened when the surrounding Como Park was developed. The lake is fed by storm sewer water run off. In the summer algae blooms were frequent and visitors complained about the smell of the lake. Attempts to improve the lake quality have been made which include replacing invasive plants with native plants, installation of other water filtration methods, application of herbicides, and alum treatments. These changes have reduced algae growth and improved the quality of the lake water as of 2022.

== Human history ==
After James-Younger Gang member Charlie Pitts was killed in the chaotic aftermath of the disastrous September 7, 1876 Northfield, Minnesota raid, his body was boxed up and temporarily submerged in the lake by Dr. Henry Hoyt, a local physician who wanted the bleached skeleton as a display piece for his office. The skeleton was on display for unknown number of years at the Stage Coach Museum in Shakopee, Minnesota. In 1981 the remains were donated to the Northfield Historical Society. Currently the skeleton is housed in the Physical Anthropology Lab at Minnesota State University in Mankato awaiting analysis.

== Fish ==
The lake contains black bullhead, black crappie, bluegill, golden shiner, green sunfish, hybrid sunfish, northern pike, pumpkinseed, walleye, white sucker, yellow bullhead, and yellow perch. Some fish consumption guideline restrictions have been placed on the lake's bluegill, bullhead, crappie, largemouth bass, northern pike, and walleye due to mercury and/or PFOS contamination.
