= Como Regional Park Pool =

Public swimming pool in Saint Paul, Minnesota

Coordinates: 44°58′34″N 93°8′59″W

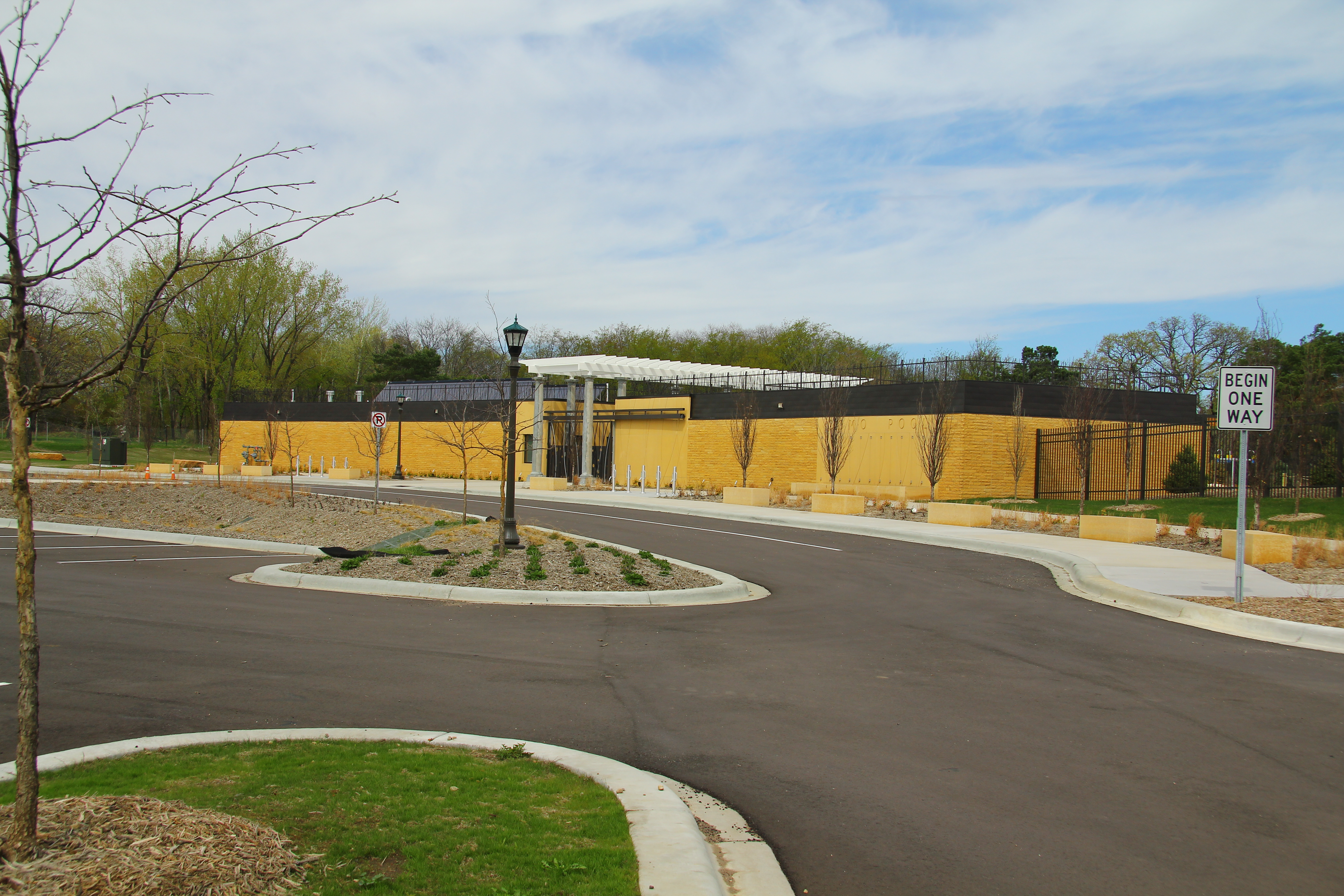
Entrance to Como Regional Park Pool in Saint Paul, Minnesota

Como Regional Park Pool or just Como Pool is a public swimming pool located in the Como Park neighborhood of Saint Paul, Minnesota.

== Old pool and site ==
Como Pool was built on the former site of the Saint Paul Workhouse which was located in Como Park until 1960. The old pool was built in 1962 for $162,000 by a private operator, Public Pools Inc., which leased the land from the city. When the company went out of business in 1965 the city purchased the pool for $15,000. The old pool had a zero-depth entry pool with a mushroom fountain and a large swimming pool with a one-meter diving board.

== Planning ==
In 2007, there were preliminary plans to close the original Como Pool which was in a deteriorating condition. The pool was nearing 50 years and was described as being “basically held together with bubblegum" by a local community organizer. The director of Parks and Recreation noted that the pool needed renovation but there were no plans or funding available at the time. In 2008 the city determined it would cost $1,000,000 to make the pool operational for the 2009 season and decided to close the pool and tear it down. Before closing the pool was visited by around 15,000 people each summer. At that point the city had no timeline for replacing the pool.

Planning for the new pool began in 2008. Community members were concerned about the potential size of the redevelopment. It was also confirmed there was no possibility of a private operator to run a waterpark. Neighbors had concerns about an increase in traffic for the surrounding area. The city sought public comment on proposed designs. The city argued the city needs a new pool because the only other outdoor pool, Highland Pool, often filled to capacity and noted a January 2008 3rd party survey which showed 74% of residents supporting major upgrades to Como Pool. Other people argued that because Como Park attracts regional visitors the new pool should be attractive for people from around the area.

Following a 2009 task force, Parks and Recreation officials hoped to secure funding in 2010 for a 2011 opening. Local politician Ellen Anderson had hoped for a natural with an environmentally friendly filtration system but city officials decided against it due to concerns about the uncertainty regulations and time concerns. In the summer of 2009 the plan to replace Como Pool did not make the city's list of recommended projects to be funded despite lobbying by mayor Chris Coleman. A master plan was released in October 2009. The plan included a lazy river, a splash pool for children and a lap swimming pool.

== Construction ==
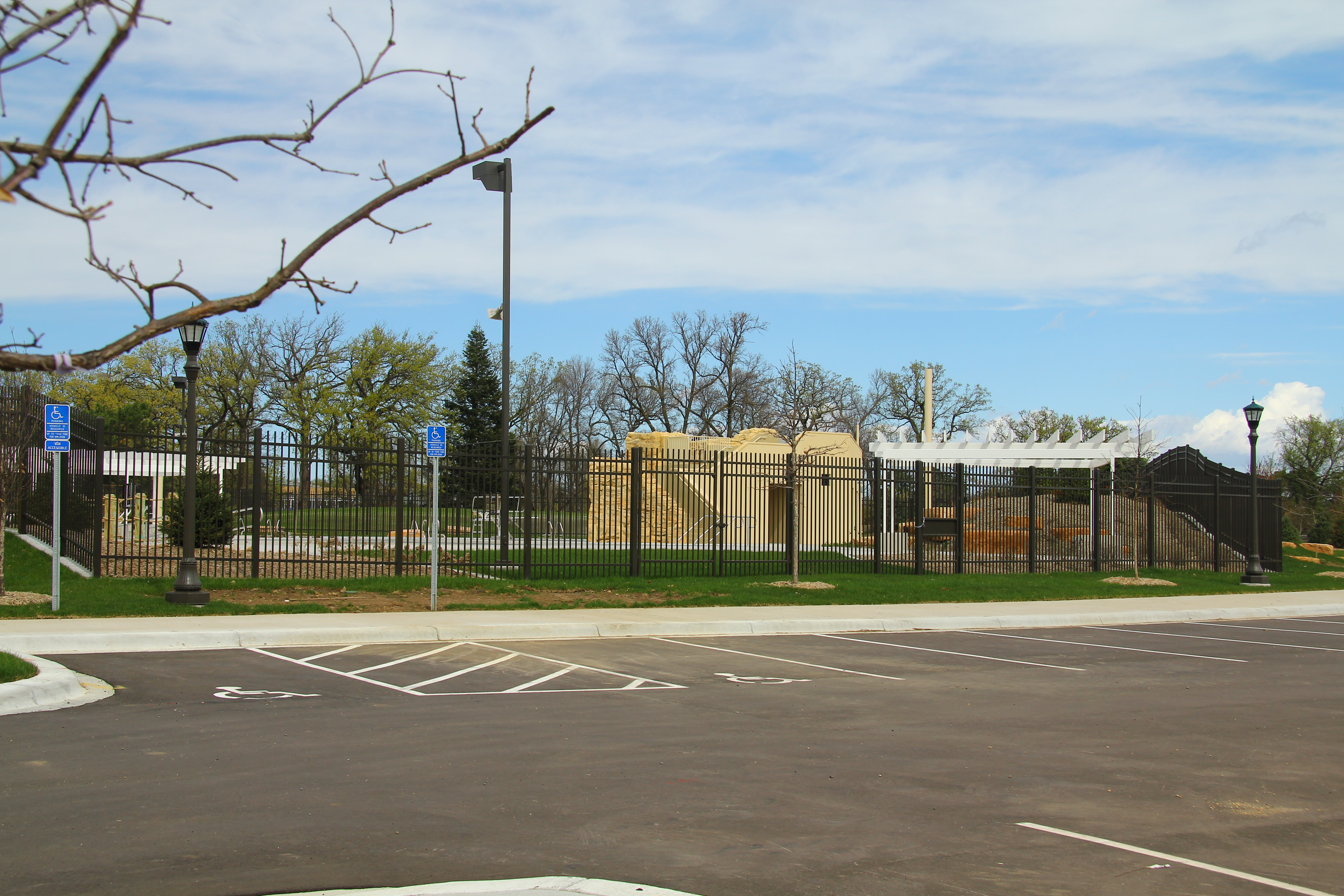
Como Regional Park Pool nearing end of construction, April 2012

Construction for the project was brought up from the previous plan of 2012 to 2010 in December 2009 by the city council. The $7.4 million project was approved with an upgrade to Highland Pool as part of a 2010 bond sale. By moving the project up two years it allowed there to be an outdoor pool open every year. The project price tag was expanded to $9.1 million with support from the Metropolitan Council and was partially funded with Build America Bonds. Construction began in 2010 with an anticipated completion date of September 2011 for opening in Spring of 2012. The project received a $150,000 grant for solar heating system. The final project included a 6 lane lap pool, a zip line, and a zero depth entry pool.

The project received an award from the Minnesota Recreation and Parks Association for the facility's features, energy efficiency and community involvement in the design. The pool received a Best of MN award for Outdoor pools from the Star Tribune which noted the facility's use of sphagnum moss to reduce chlorine usage.

The pool has cliffs to jump off, a climbing wall, a diving board and a zip line over a 25-meter pool. The zero depth entry pool has slides, water guns and water spouts. The lazy river has a slower and faster route and a waterfall. The designers aimed for a more natural looking with landscaping and energy efficient building features. The final cost was $9.2 million.
