= Crex Meadows =

State Wildlife Area in Burnett County, Wisconsin

Crex Meadows Wildlife Area
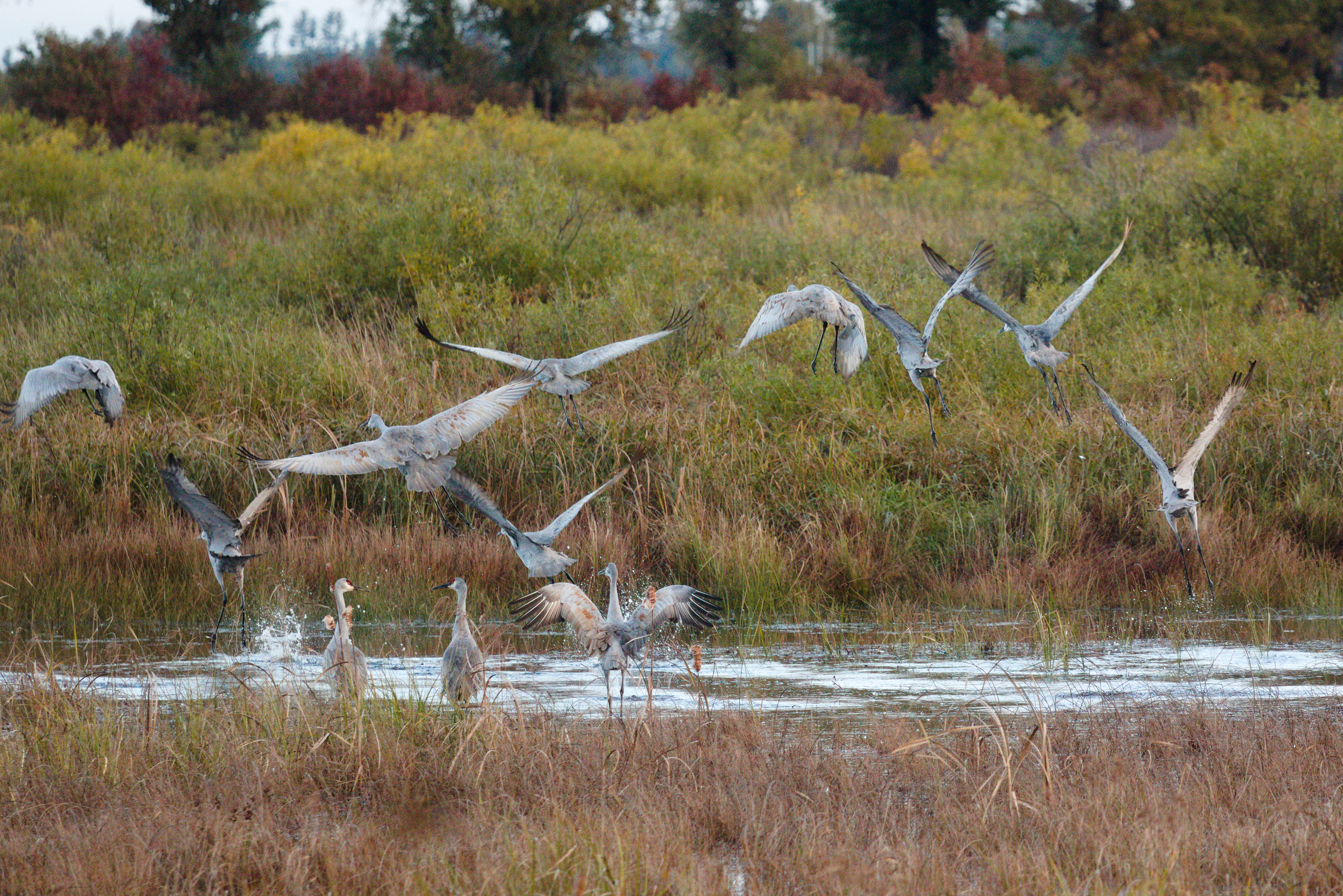
- Sandhill cranes (Grus canadensis) taking flight at Crex Meadows

- Location within Wisconsin Location within the United States
- Location: Burnett County, Wisconsin, United States
- Nearest town: Grantsburg, Wisconsin
- Coordinates: 45°51′13″N 92°36′16″W
- Area: 30,000 acres (120 km^{2})
- Established: 1946
- Visitors: >100,000
- Governing body: Wisconsin Department of Natural Resources
- Website: https://dnr.wisconsin.gov/topic/Lands/WildlifeAreas/crex

The Crex Meadows Wildlife Area consists of marshes, wetlands, brush prairies, and forests. Crex Meadows is located near the village of Grantsburg, Wisconsin, in Burnett County. Its 30,000 acres (120 km^{2}) are home to 270 species of birds and 600 species of plants.

== Geology ==
Crex Meadows is included in the Northwest Wisconsin pine barrens. These “barrens” are a large, sandy plain that was left as the glacier withdrew from the area around 13,000 years ago. Crex is located in the southern area of the barrens and contains huge marshes. The Crex Meadows were the result of the glacier that created the early Glacial Lake Grantsburg.

== History ==
The area has been inhabited by many peoples, including the Meskwaki, Dakota, and Ojibwe peoples who used the region mainly for hunting and gathering. During the 17th century, many battles are thought to have occurred in the area. The Ojibwe ruled the area when Europeans first arrived in the area during the 18th century.

Starting in the 19th century, the Euro-Americans tried farming the sandy soil, but gave up. The lack of wildfires in the area nearly eliminated the brush prairie. A large drainage project in the 1890s resulted in less use of the area by wetland birds and other animals.

In 1912, the Crex Carpet Company of St. Paul, Minnesota bought 23,000 acres (93 km^{2}) of today’s Crex Meadows. The company produced grass rugs and created carpet camps in the area. The grass rug business was successful until linoleum floor covering became popular in homes. In 1933 the Crex Carpet Company went bankrupt.

In 1946, the state of Wisconsin bought 12,000 acres (49 km^{2}) of the tax delinquent land in order to start the Crex Meadows Wildlife Area. It would eventually reach 30,000 acres (120 km^{2}) in size, with 2,400 acres (9.7 km^{2}) of that a state wildlife refuge. As of 2024, Crex Meadows has 29 flowages that flood 6,000 acres (24 km^{2}), and it is managed to "provide opportunities for public hunting, trapping and other outdoor recreation while protecting the qualities of the unique native communities and associated species found on the property."

Some neighbors began experiencing flooding on their properties and tainted drinking water from their wells around 2017. Wisconsin Department of Natural Resources officials say those problems are caused by years of heavy precipitation related to climate change and not by the management of the water levels in the wildlife area.

== Wildlife ==
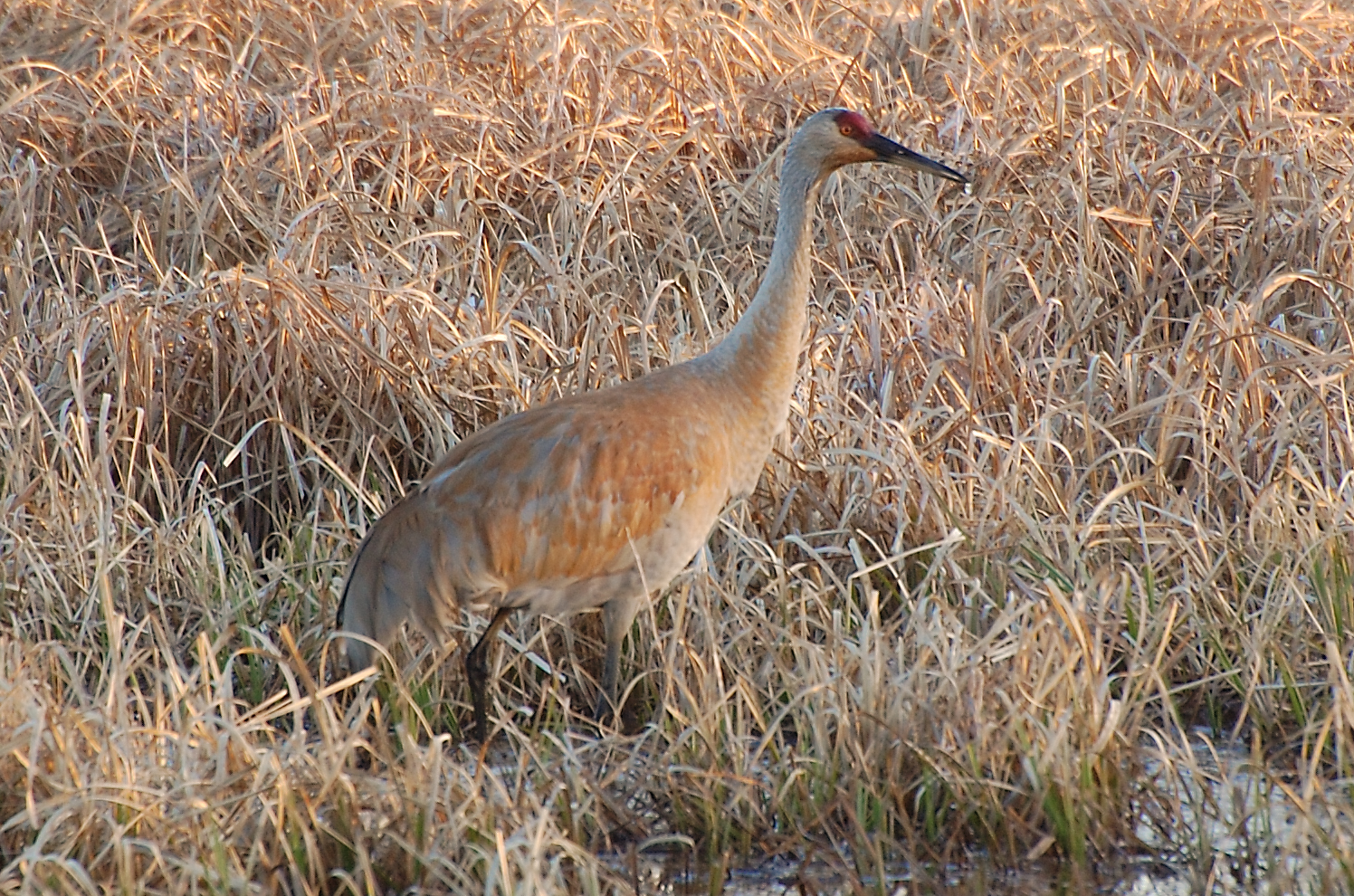
Grus canadensis, Crex Meadows

The National Bird Conservancy categorizes Crex Meadows as one of the top 500 Globally Important Bird Areas in the United States of America. Crex Meadows has a wide variety of bird species and is home to nearly every mammal found in Wisconsin as well as other marsh dwelling species.

Ospreys, eagles, trumpeter swans, Karner blue butterflies, Blanding's turtles, and red-necked grebes are some of the endangered and threatened animals that find shelter in Crex Meadows. A pack of timber wolves, nicknamed the Crex pack, have been breeding and living on the property since 1995. Additionally, the peregrine falcon, Caspian tern, and great egret seasonally make their home at Crex.

== Recreation ==
Besides birding, visitors to Crex Meadows Wildlife Area can also go camping, canoeing, boating, kayaking, cross-country skiing, snowmobiling, hunting, trapping, and hiking. Within the wildlife area, the 2,400 acre wildlife refuge is closed to visitors.
